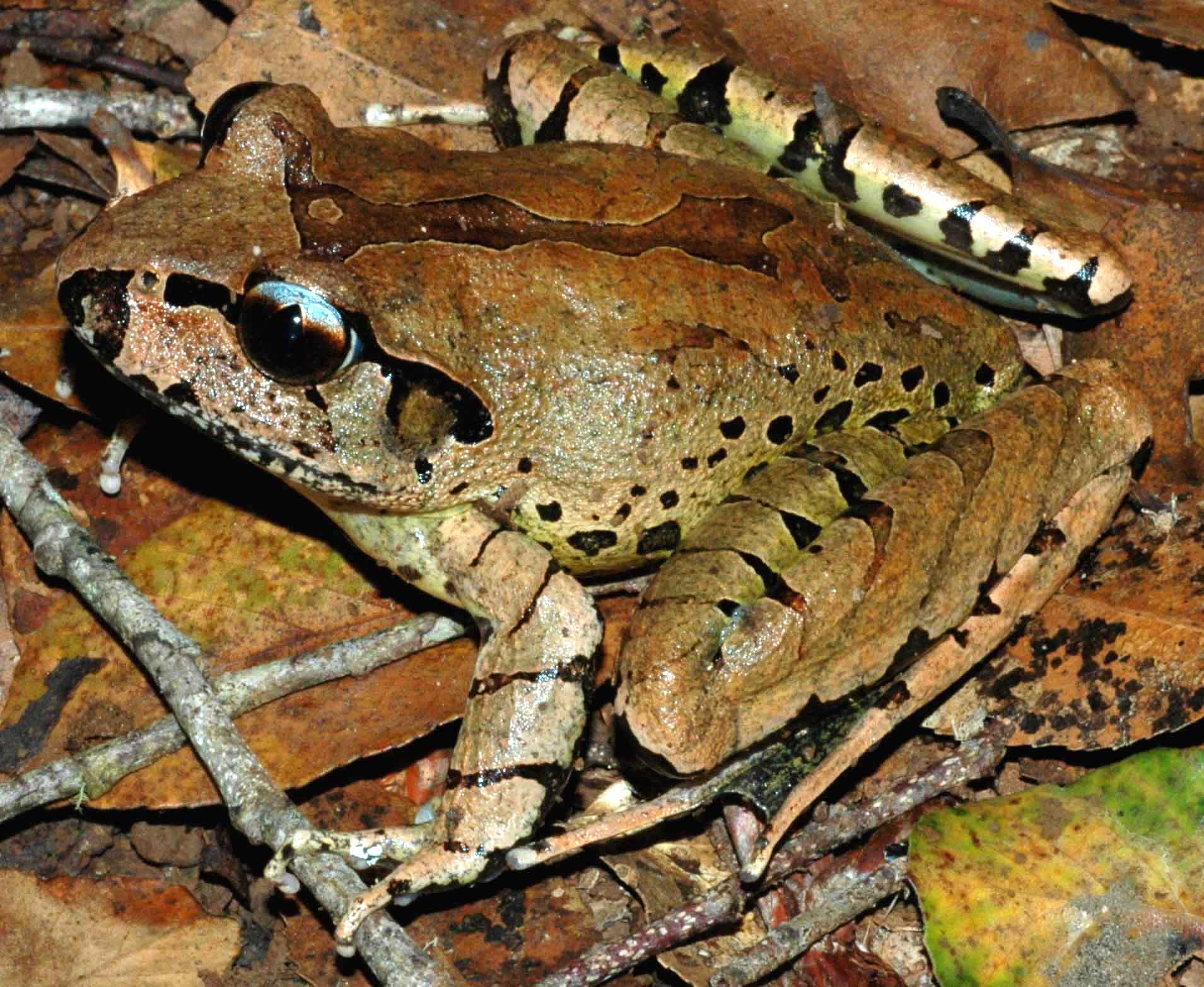

Conservation status
- Endangered (IUCN 3.1)

Scientific classification
- Kingdom: Animalia
- Phylum: Chordata
- Class: Amphibia
- Order: Anura
- Family: Myobatrachidae
- Genus: Mixophyes
- Species: M. fleayi

Binomial name
- Mixophyes fleayi Corben & Ingram, 1987
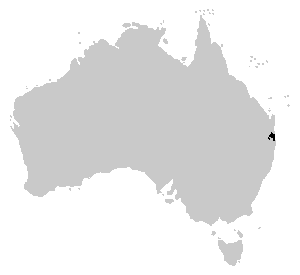
- Fleay's barred frog range

= Fleay's barred frog =

Species of amphibian

Fleay's barred frog (Mixophyes fleayi) is a large species of frog restricted to small pockets of rainforest in northern New South Wales and south-eastern Queensland, Australia.

== Distribution ==
This species has a fragmented distribution in wet forests from Conondale Range in Queensland in the north, to Yabbra Scrub in northern New South Wales to the south. The majority of the population occurs in rainforests above 400m, however it is also known from some lowland rainforest sites. This species has declined from many sites in Queensland since the 1970s. It is currently known from Conondale and Main Range, Springbrook and Lamington Plateaux and Mount Barney in Queensland and Border Ranges, Mount Warning, Nightcap Range and Yabbra and Tooloom Scrub in New South Wales. Historical area of occurrence is about 7000 km². This species has disappeared completely from Bunya Mountains and Mount Tamborine in Queensland.

== Description ==
Fleay's barred frog is a moderately large species of frog, up to 90mm in length. It is light brown with darker blotches and is finely granular on the dorsal surface. There is an irregular darker brown band starting behind the eyes and continuing down the back. A dark stripe on the head starts in front of the nostril and continues through the eye to the tympanum. The arms and legs have 7-8 narrow dark bars. The flanks have scattered dark spots and blotches. The top third of the iris is silvery to pale blue, the bottom two thirds are brown. The upper lip is spotted with brown. The ventral surface is smooth and pale yellow or white. The toes are three-quarters webbed. The frog was named after Australian naturalist David Fleay.

== Ecology and behaviour ==
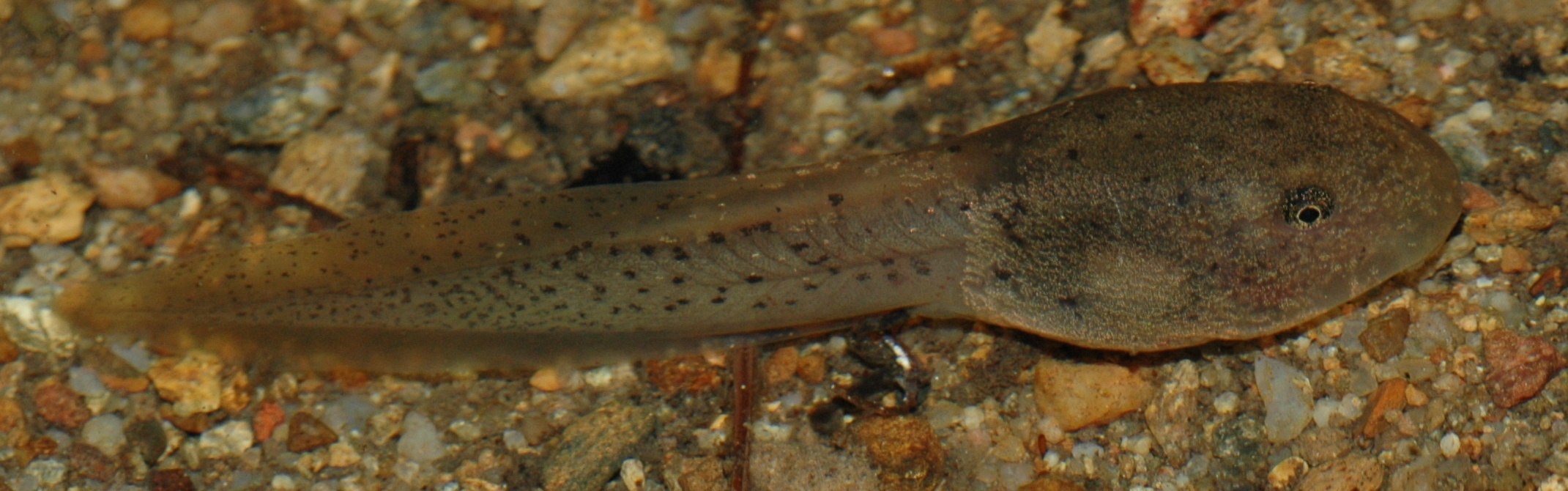
Mixophyes fleayi tadpole.

This species is associated with flowing streams and creeks in rainforest and adjacent wet sclerophyll and Antarctic Beech forest. Males make a "ok-ok-ok-ok-ok" or "arrrrk" call from leaf litter beside streams after rain during spring and summer. Eggs are laid in a dug out nest in gravel and leaf litter in shallow flowing water. Tadpoles are large, reaching 65mm in length. Metamorphosis takes about 200 days and metamorphs measure about 20mm and resemble the adult, except the iris colour is copper-red.

The extent of decline of this species has been difficult to measure due to the lack of historical records of sites and abundance.

== Similar species ==
This species is similar to other frogs in the genus Mixophys, particularly the stuttering frog (Mixophyes balbus) of which it can only be distinguished by the presence of mottling on the flanks. The great barred frog (Mixophyes fasciolatus) and giant barred frog (Mixophyes iteratus) also occur in the same area as this species. Eye colour is best used to distinguish them, as it is different in all 3 species.

== Conservation status ==
It is listed as Endangered under both the IUCN Red List and Queensland's Nature Conservation Act 1992.

== Gallery ==
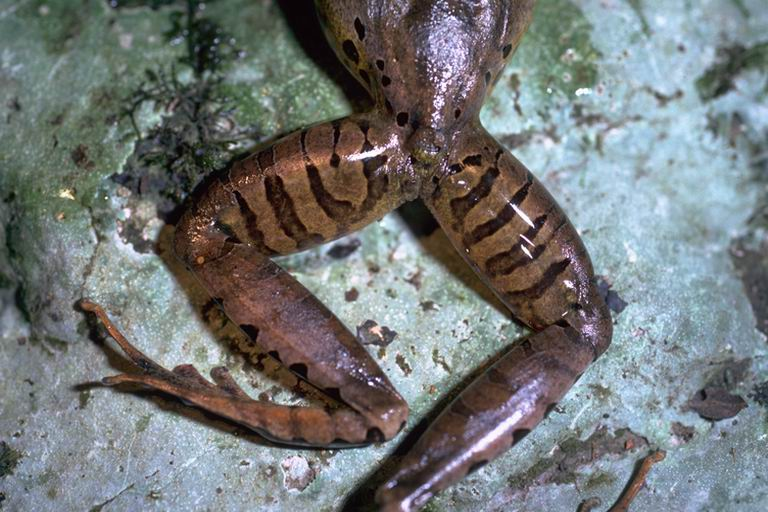
Fleay's barred frog legs

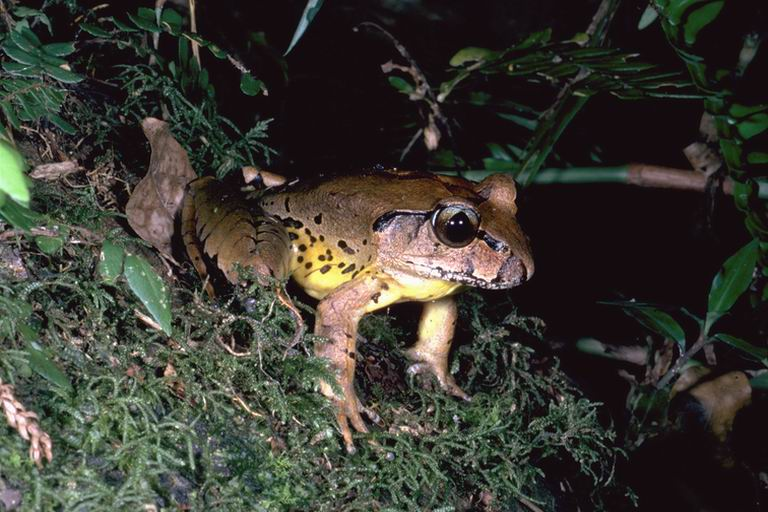
Fleay's barred frog

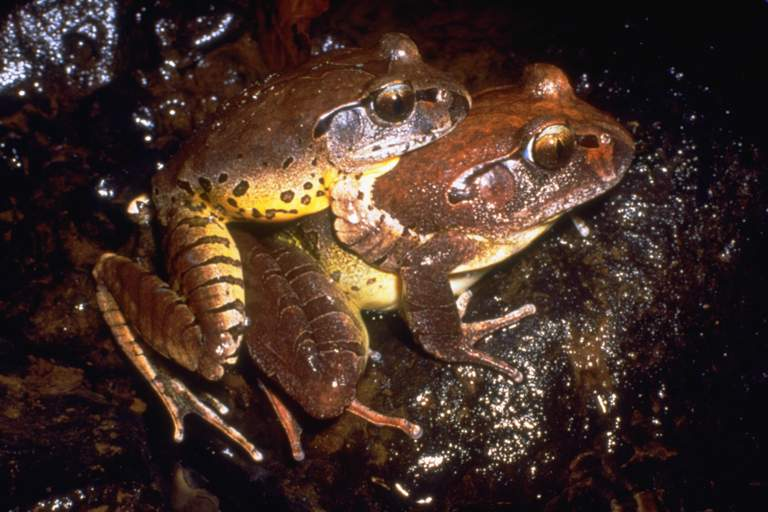
Two Fleay's barred frogs
