= Symbio Wildlife Park =

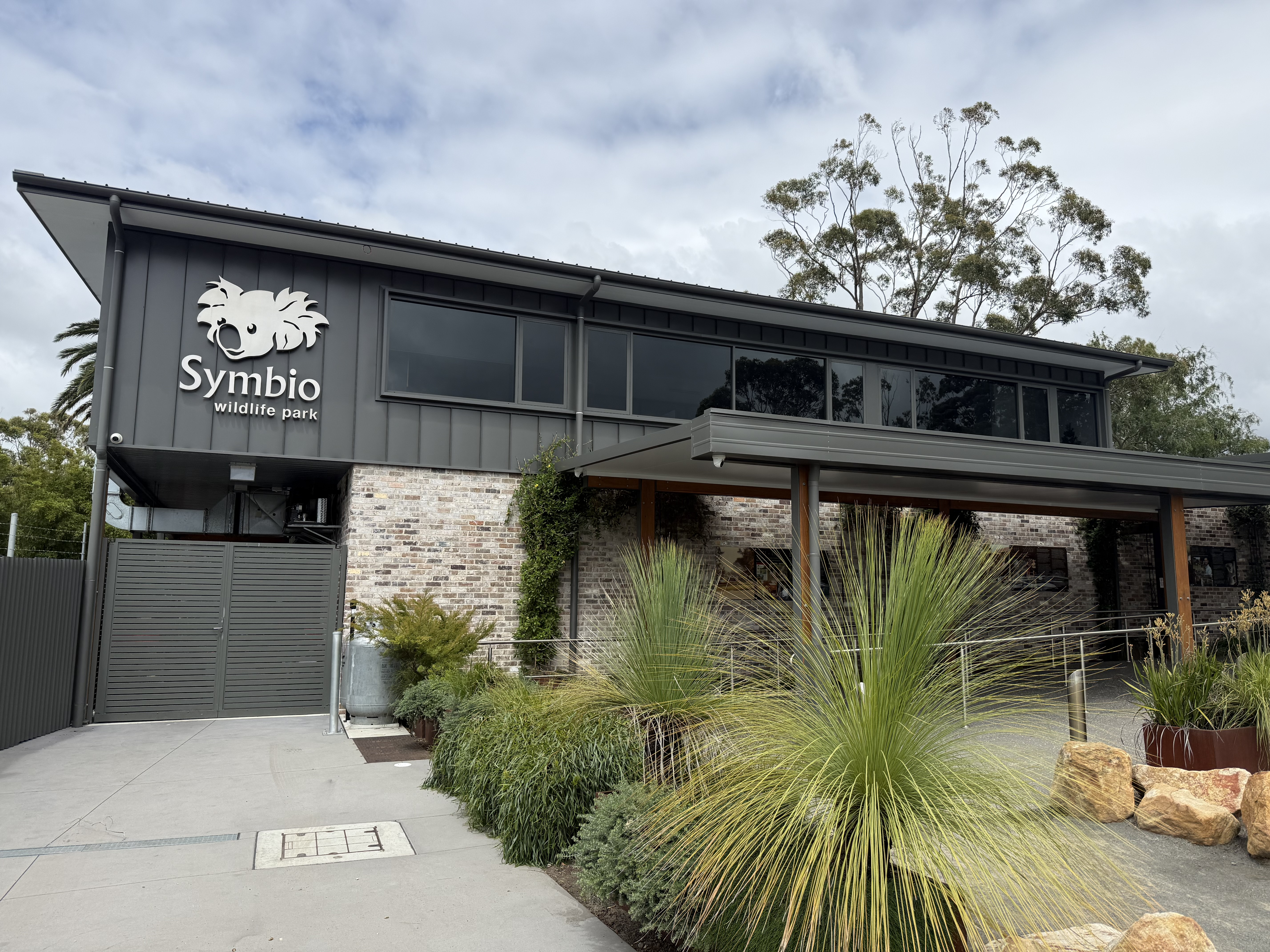
- Symbio Wildlife Park, January 2026
- Interactive map of Symbio Wildlife Park
- 34.204451°S 150.969438°E
- Date opened: 1975
- Location: Helensburgh, New South Wales, Australia
- Land area: 16 acres (6.5 ha)
- Memberships: Zoo and Aquarium Association
- Website: symbiozoo.com.au

Symbio Wildlife Park is a privately owned medium sized zoo located in Helensburgh, New South Wales, south of Sydney and in close proximity to the City of Wollongong.

Beginning in 1975 as a native Australian wildlife park, Symbio later expanded its holdings with a number of different animals from other countries also, and has contributed to conservation work and captive breeding programs for both Australian and exotic animals. In 2021 the park established specialty built captive-breeding facilities for native vulnerable and endangered Bellinger River snapping turtles, Manning River snapping turtles and Stuttering frogs. Among Symbio's animal residents is an albino echidna named Leo.

In recent years, Symbio Wildlife Park has introduced additional visitor experiences such as behind-the-scenes access and scheduled keeper talks, reflecting a broader trend among regional zoos toward more interactive and educational formats. Modest upgrades to pathways, enclosures, and planted areas have also been made, with an emphasis on incorporating native vegetation and creating environments that resemble the animals' natural habitats.

Kelly Clarkson and David Beckham have visited the zoo with the singer visiting the zoo in 2015 and the footballer visiting in 2018.

Animal species at the park include:

- Alpaca
- American alligator
- Bare-nosed wombat
- Bellinger River snapping turtle
- Boyd's forest dragon
- Carpet python
- Central bearded dragon
- Cheetah
- Common death adder
- Common marmoset
- Dingo
- Eastern blue-tongue lizard
- Eastern grey kangaroo
- Eastern yellow robin
- Emu
- Freshwater crocodile
- Frilled-neck lizard
- Gang-gang cockatoo
- Gila monster
- Golden lion tamarin
- Inland taipan
- Koala
- Little penguin
- Manning River snapping turtle
- Meerkat
- Nicobar pigeon
- Noisy pitta
- Pygmy marmoset
- Rainbow lorikeet
- Red panda
- Red-bellied black snake
- Regent bowerbird
- Ring-tailed lemur
- Saltwater crocodile
- Shingleback skink
- Short-beaked echidna
- Southern cassowary
- Stuttering frog
- Sulphur-crested cockatoo
- Superb fruit-dove
- Tasmanian devil
- Tawny frogmouth
- Wedge-tailed eagle
- White-browed scrubwren
- White-fronted chat
- Wompoo fruit-dove

== Incidents ==
In March 2022, a red panda named Kesari was put down after escaping from the park and being hit by a vehicle after a tree fell.

== Gallery ==
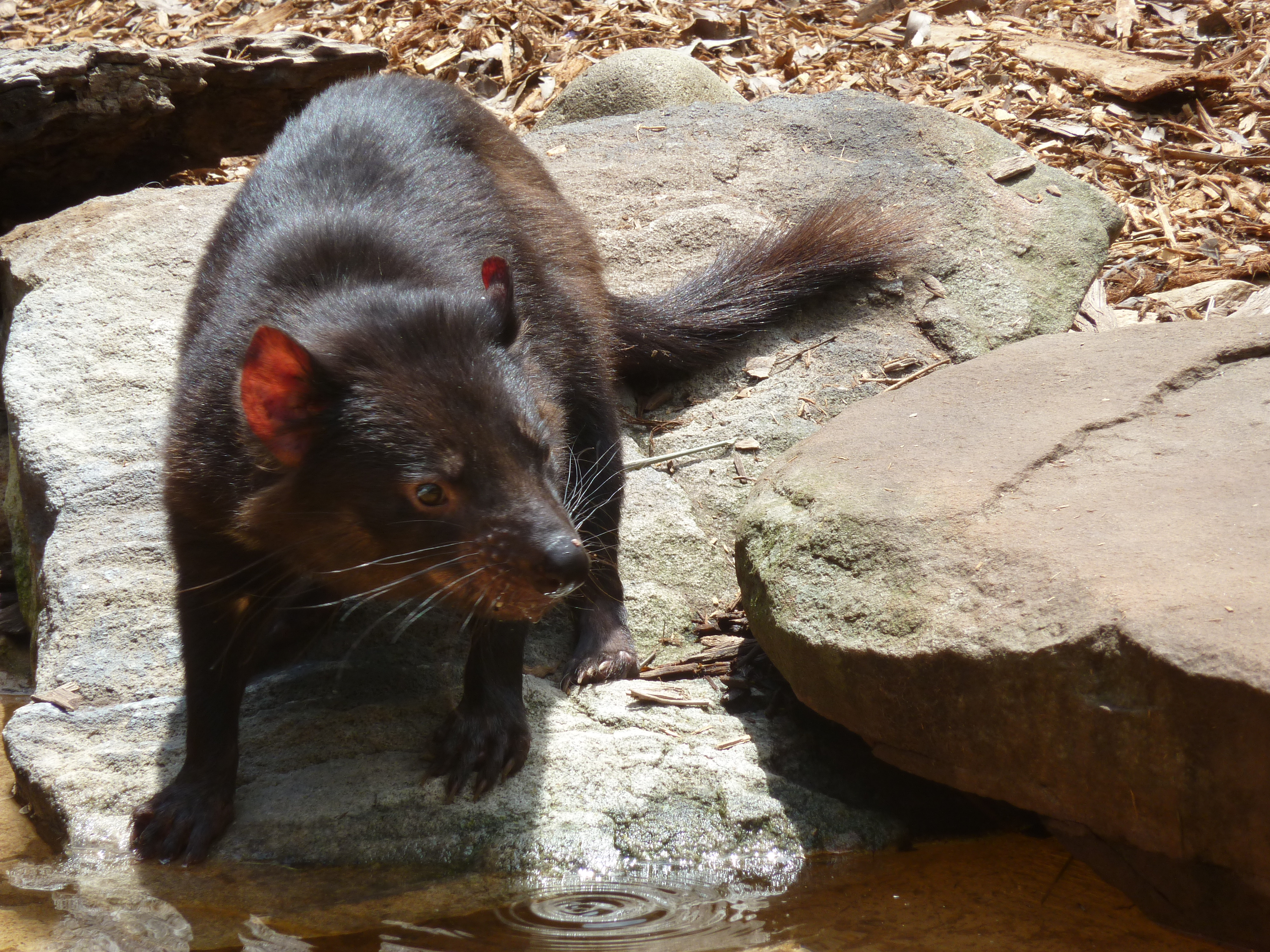
Tasmanian devil at the park

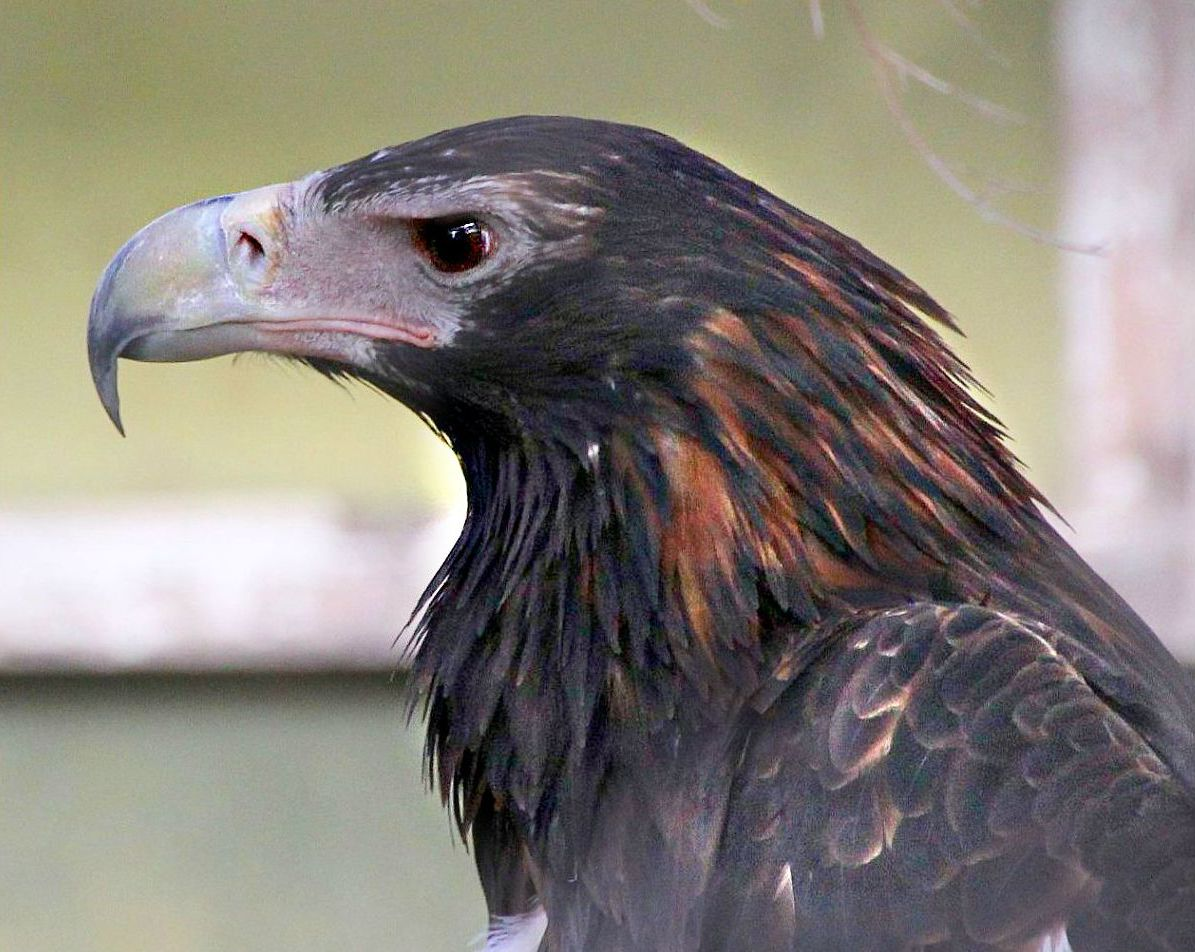
Wedge-tailed eagle at the park

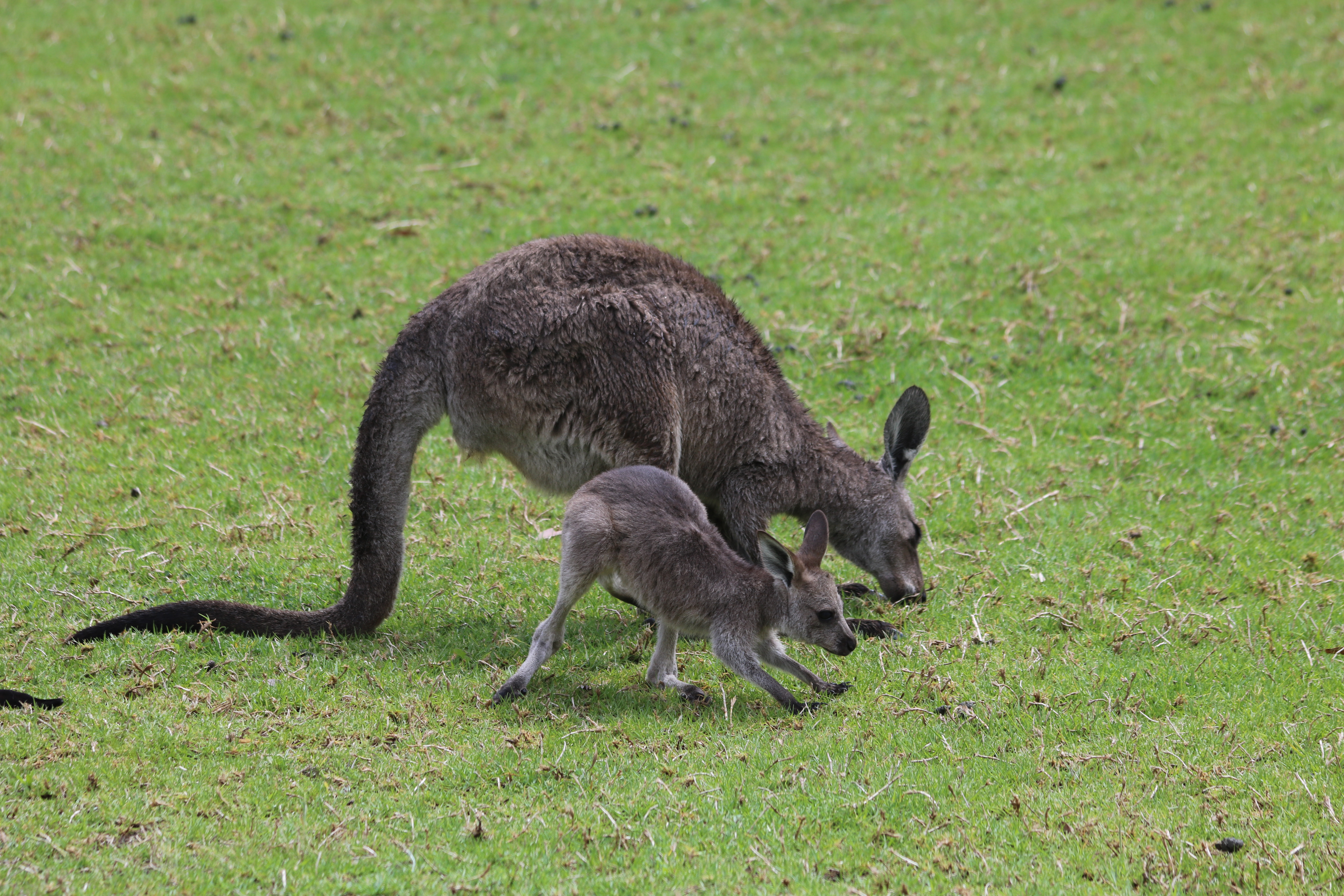
Eastern grey kangaroo and her joey at the park
