= Windsor Tablelands =

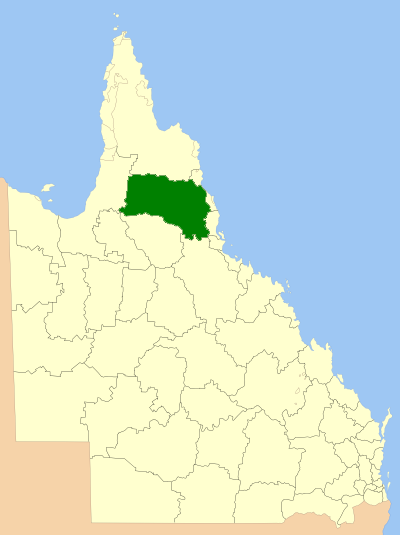
- The Windsor Tablelands are located within the greater Tableland region Queensland, 2013.
- Country: Australia
- State: Queensland
- Region: Far North Queensland

Government
  - State electorate: Cook
  - Federal division: Kennedy

Area
  - Total: 48,930 ha (120,900 acres)
- Website: Windsor Tablelands
Localities around Windsor Tablelands
		Cairns
	Windsor Tablelands	Cairns
Etheridge	Charters Towers	Cassowary Coast, Hinchinbrook

The Windsor Tablelands are a series of plateaus located in Far North Queensland, Australia. The Windsor Tableland and surrounding rainforest area are contained within traditional lands of the Western Yalanji Aboriginal people, as part of the Wet Tropics of Queensland, sitting between the Daintree Rainforest and Mount Lewis National Park. Additionally, the region is contained in the state electorate of Cook and situated in the greater Tablelands Region of North Queensland. The Tablelands hug the mountain ranges of the Great Dividing Range with the nearest town being Wujal Wujal (44 km away). The Tableland area is a larger part of the Mount Windsor Forest Reserve (Mount Windsor National Park) which represents 44,000 hectares of land in the Wet Tropic region and is a conserved nature area, as proclaimed by the Government of Queensland in 2005. Predominately the majority of the Mount Windsor Tableland is closed off for any form of public use and access to the area is often only given on request. There is currently no residential population in the Mount Windsor Tableland region as a majority of the area is national park.

== Features and location ==
The Tablelands have a combined total area of 489.3 km^{2} (188.9 sq mi) and consist of diverse range of wetland, rainforest, and mountain ecosystems. While considered part of the Wet Tropics region, the Tableland region also exhibits open forest and drylands forest areas. Being the sixth highest locality in Queensland, the Tableland region sits, on average, 1,186 m (3,891 ft) above sea level. The range of altitudes of the plateau varies roughly from 900–1,200 m (3,000–3,900 ft). Due to its height, its various peaks are often not visible, covered by clouds or dense fog that are often emblematic of the humid, Wet Tropics region. The landscape, as mentioned before, ranges from drylands forest areas to rainforest, but also exhibits many running streams, waterfalls and other bodies of water that contain an abundance of aquatic life. Surrounding tableland plateaus include the Mount Carbine Tableland, similar in both its geography and conserved within the World Heritage area of the Wet Tropics of Queensland. Rainfall measurements conducted from the nearest possible station, being the Mossman Central Mill weather station, demonstrates, generally, largest rainfall throughout the summer months of January and February and lower readings through the winter months in the middle of the year. From data dating back to 1950, gathered from the Australian Bureau of Meteorology, annual rainfall exceeds 1 meter (3 ft 3 in) and has in some cases, ranged to and above 4 meters (13 ft). Mean annual rainfall is more closely centred around 2.3 meters (7 ft 7 in). This data is specific to the Mossman Central Mill weather station with location 16.46°S 145.37°E.

== History and heritage listing ==
The Windsor Tablelands is a conserved wildlife and natural area that mostly consists of the Mount Windsor National Park, a part of Wet Tropics of Queensland. Aboriginal heritage and that the traditional owners of the area belongs to the Western Yalanji people. The Tablelands gained conservation status on 22 December 2005, due to the diverse range of plant and wildlife that culminated in the area being recognised as a predominate wilderness area. Previous to being declared a conserved, National Park the area had been used for tin mines and timber. Additionally, there had been several small cattle farms that operated in the area. CSIRO, once operated in the area, maintaining a forest research station until it was discontinued for use in the 1980s.

=== Wet Tropics of Queensland and Windsor Tablelands protesting ===
Prior to the Wet Tropics of Queensland becoming a World Heritage Site in 1988, the Windsor Tablelands and surrounding rainforest areas were being paved for roads, new tourism locations and utilised for its timber and other natural resources. While the region had been logged and utilised for its resources since settlement began extensively in North Queensland in 1860, major social and political protesting against developers in the region would only gain traction and government consideration through broadcast media in the 1980s. While the Daintree blockade had critical impact for universal recognition of the Wet Tropics of Queensland as a UNESCO World Heritage Site, the Mt. Windsor blockade was one of the first protests conducted in 1981, that was in direct defiance to extensive logging in the Windsor Tableland and surrounding regions. While protestors were arrested at the Mt. Windsor blockade and the protesting subdued, their efforts had impact through subsequent media traction and following protesting that would occur for the Wet Tropics of North Queensland.

Although it would take the Windsor Tableland region until 2005 to be proclaimed as a nationally, conserved area, the protesting of the Mt. Windsor blockade, Daintree region and surrounding rainforest habitats had led the way for the conservation of the such North Queensland rainforest and natural ecosystems.

=== Past impacts of logging in the region ===
Prior to be conserved as a World Heritage Site through the Wet Tropics of Queensland, the Mount Windsor Tableland region was extensively logged for its timber. The rainforest region was once harvested purely for its economic value and the value of Tableland region as a home for a diverse range of wildlife and plant life predominantly overlooked. In order to gain access to large hectares of quality rainforest trees and other drylands-forest trees, bulldozes would dismantle terrain for clear passage to these sites. While the impacts of the logging itself had major implications for destruction of rainforest habitats, the construction of logging tracks in the area also had considerable impact. As much as one logging site could require a few kilometres worth of bulldozing to create a path to such grounds. These tracks were often meters wide too. Streams and bodies of water were often filled with the displacement of dirt, foliage and debris from these tracks via both the construction of them and the movement of operating vehicles on the land. Some water bodies would take years to settle back to clarified levels able to sustain wildlife. Assumably, large reductions in rainforest and woodland coverage and extensive canopy loss was incurred. Canopy loss is a major threat to rainforests, this reduction can weaken the rainforest ability to withstand abnormal weather phenomenon and protect the wildlife dependent on these ecosystems. A majority of the logging in the Mount Windsor Tableland area was for commercial sale.

Additionally, other than the more direct impacts on the rainforest landscape in terms of cutting down vast areas of forest for timber, logging has had casual effects on animal species and their dwindling numbers in the region. One study by the CSIRO Division of Wildlife and Ecology, attributed the logging of parts of the Mount Windsor Tableland rainforest towards declining numbers of migrating bird species and native bird species to the area. Studies conducted through the CSIRO Division recorded the presence of three species of bower bird. These included: the Golden Bowerbird, Satin Bowerbird and the Tooth-billed Catbird. Tracking numbers prior and then after logging occurred, showing strong indication of the displacement of these bird species and whether permanent or long-term, indicated the effects of logging on the wildlife of the Mount Windsor Tableland.

== Fauna ==
There are a total of 284 species of animal specific to Mount Windsor National Park. The Tablelands have many flowing streams, and in such host a variety of aquatic animals. They include crayfish, platypuses, tadpoles; which grow into local Carbine Barred Frogs and other species of frog and many other aquatic species that are specific to the high-altitude area of the Tablelands. Some mammal species like the Daintree River ringtail possum can only be found at the Mount Windsor Tableland, among two other locations, being the Daintree rainforest and the Mount Carbine Tableland. As a conservation area, the Windsor Tablelands hosts many vulnerable, endangered and critically endangered species categorised through the: EPBC - Status under the Environment Protection and Biodiversity Conservation Act 1999. These animals are being closely monitored by Queensland Government's Department of Environment and Science and initiatives such as increasing protected areas, installing nature refuges and other plans that are in place to help restore species numbers back to safe levels.

=== Endangered species ===
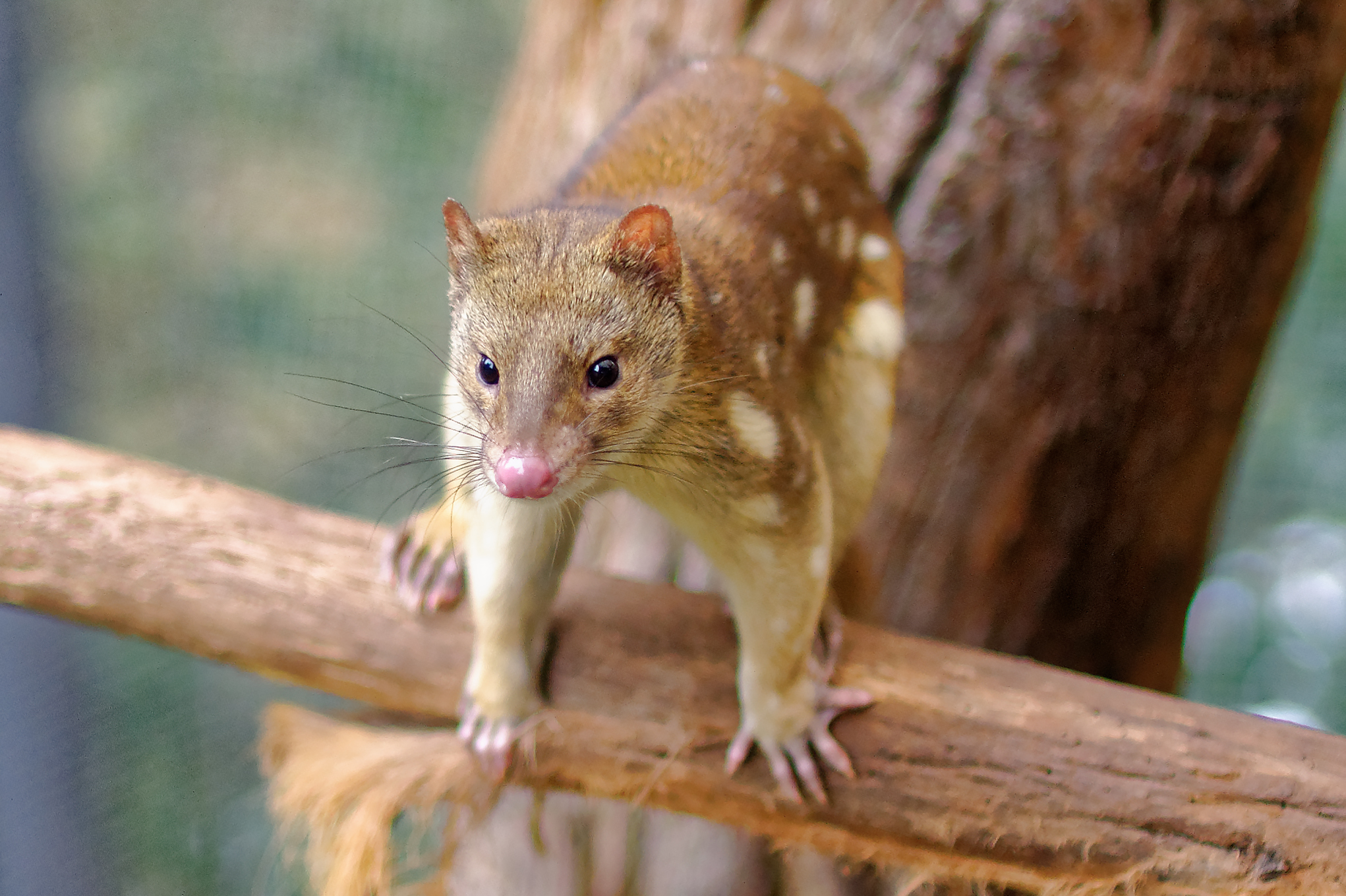
Spotted-tailed Quoll

The spotted-tailed quoll (northern subspecies) also commonly named the tiger quoll or tiger cat, is a carnivorous mammal that inhibits the Windsor Tableland area. The Northern bettong is another endangered species of mammal that is specific to the North Queensland area and the Tablelands, that is considered endangered under the EPBC status. This small, rabbit sized animal can be found scattered between predominantly the Windsor Tablelands, Coane Range and the Lamb Range. Other endangered mammals include the Northern Quoll. There are also many amphibians that are endangered and specific to the Windsor Tableland ecosystem, these include the waterfall frog, common mist frog, and Australian lace-lid.

=== Critically endangered species ===
Federal Legislation from the EPBC Act 1999, denotes that for an animal to be considered critically endangered it must be at an extremely high risk of becoming extinct within the near future. There is only one animal with this critical classification that is native to the Windsor Tablelands. This animal is the little waterfall frog. A fungus named Chytridiomycosis is a highly deadly disease that has led to the declining numbers of the little waterfall frog. These frogs are being closely monitored in areas such as the Windsor Tablelands and through initiative such as the Threat abatement plan for infection of amphibians with chytrid fungus 2016, the Queensland government are attempting to recover the declining numbers of the little waterfall frog and other endangered amphibian species.

=== Globally protected bird species ===
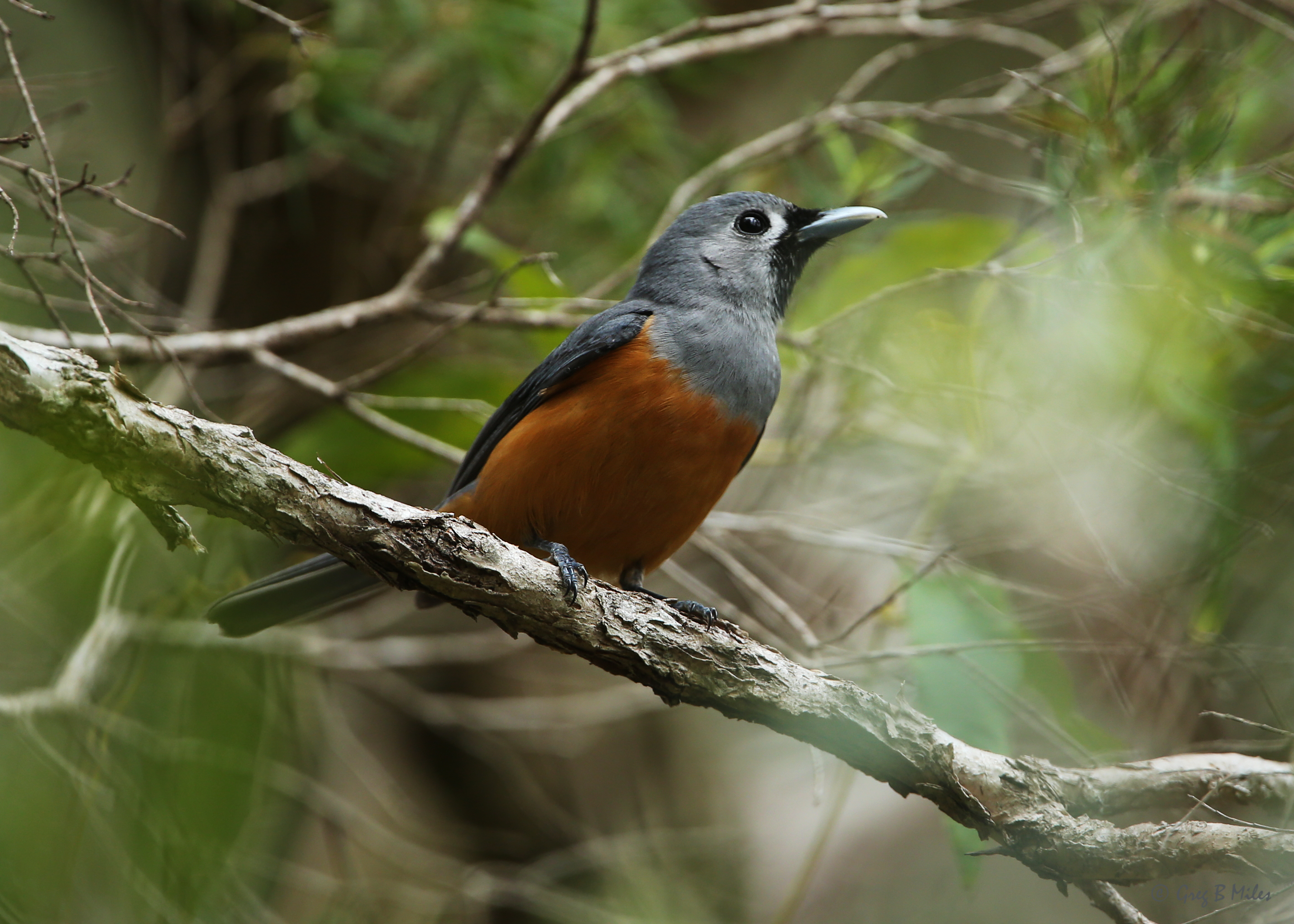
Black-faced monarch

The Tableland area hosts a wide variety of bird species that are native to the area and also protected under international agreements. Three birds have gained international protection status as migrating species that inhabit the Mount Windsor Tableland region. The Convention on the Conservation of Migratory Species of Wild Animals or Bonn Convention for short, is the international treaty that has protected these birds. The three birds include the: black-faced monarch, spectacled monarch and rufous fantail. Given these three birds are migrating species, the Convention on the Conservation of Migratory Species of Wild Animals, ensures the cooperation of all regions that these birds inhabit, namely being, the Mount Windsor Tablelands. While not endangered, the species of birds are protected under the Bonn convention species and their numbers, monitored in the Tableland region.

== Flora ==
There are a total of 1103 species of plant and fungi specific to the Mount Windsor National Park. As of recent records produced by the Queensland Government's Wetlands Program, there are 8 species of both plant and fungi that are declared vulnerable status under through the: EPBC - Status under the Environment Protection and Biodiversity Conservation Act 1999. The Red-Throated Bloodwood (Corymbia Rhodops) is a 'vulnerable' classified plant, specific to the Wet Tropics of Queensland and more specifically, the Windsor Tablelands. Another plant species named the Phlegmariurus Lockyeri is a tassel fern that has currently been classified as 'vulnerable'. These plants often grow of rocks and other plants and best thrive in high-altitude rainforest landscapes such as the Mound Windsor Tableland. In past decades, mining sites and activity have been the main threat to the survival of this species in North and Western Queensland. Additionally, the Cypress Orchid or Thin Feather Orchid (Dendrobium callitrophilum) is a form of flowering orchid specific to the wetland and rainforest ecosystems of the Tableland region that has been classified as vulnerable. While the flora of the Windsor Tablelands are protected and managed through being listed as both a National Park and part of the world heritage listing of the Wet Queensland Tropics, past logging and mining activity in and around the area had caused the plants listed and others, to become vulnerable and severely damaged.
