= Carbine barred frog =

Scientific classification
- Kingdom: Animalia
- Phylum: Chordata
- Class: Amphibia
- Order: Anura
- Family: Myobatrachidae
- Genus: Mixophyes
- Species: M. carbinensis

Binomial name
- Mixophyes carbinensis Mahony, Donnellan, Richards & McDonald, 2006

Species of Australian frog

The Carbine barred frog (Mixophyes carbinensis), or Carbine frog, is a species of large frog that is endemic to Australia.

== Description ==
The species grows to about 80 mm in length (SVL). Colouration is brown on the back, with darker patches and a longitudinal dark stripe; the belly is white; the male has an orange and grey throat. The fingers are unwebbed; the toes are webbed.

== Behaviour ==
Eggs are laid in stream pools in tropical rainforest, and are then kicked out of the water by the female to stick to solid surfaces, such as rock faces, above the pools. The tadpoles then drop into the water after hatching.

== Distribution and habitat ==
The species occurs only on the Carbine and Windsor Tablelands in the Wet Tropics of north-eastern Queensland.
