= Daviesia filipes =

Scientific classification
- Kingdom: Plantae
- Clade: Tracheophytes
- Clade: Angiosperms
- Clade: Eudicots
- Clade: Rosids
- Order: Fabales
- Family: Fabaceae
- Subfamily: Faboideae
- Genus: Daviesia
- Species: D. filipes

Binomial name
- Daviesia filipes Benth.

Species of flowering plant

Daviesia filipes is a species of flowering plant in the family Fabaceae and is endemic to Queensland. It is a shrub with hairy foliage, crowded, narrowly oblong phyllodes, and yellow and maroon flowers.

== Description ==
Daviesia filipes is a shrub that typically grows to a height of up to 1.5 m (4 ft 11 in) and has hairy foliage. Its phyllodes are crowded, narrowly oblong, mostly 9–19 mm (0.35–0.75 in) long and 1.5–6.0 mm (0.059–0.236 in) wide. The flowers are arranged in groups of up to five on a peduncle 0.5–9 mm (0.020–0.354 in) long, each flower on a pedicel 4–12 mm (0.16–0.47 in) long with overlapping bracts up to 0.5 mm (0.020 in) long at the base. The sepals are 2.5–3.0 mm (0.098–0.118 in) long and joined at the base, the two upper lobes joined for most of their length and the lower three triangular. The standard petal is broadly egg-shaped with the narrower end towards the base, 4.5–5.0 mm (0.18–0.20 in) long, 3.5–4.0 mm (0.14–0.16 in) wide and yellow with reddish blotches near the base. The wings are 4.5–5.0 mm (0.18–0.20 in) long and yellow with a maroon base, and the keel is 4.5–5.0 mm (0.18–0.20 in) long and maroon. Flowering occurs from April to November and the fruit is a slightly flattened, triangular pod 7–9 mm (0.28–0.35 in) long.

== Taxonomy and naming ==
Daviesia filipes was first formally described in 1848 by George Bentham in Thomas Mitchell's Journal of an Expedition into the Interior of Tropical Australia. The specific epithet (filipes) means "thread-footed".

In 2017, Michael Crisp and Gregory T. Chandler described two subspecies and the names are accepted by the Australian Plant Census:

- Daviesia filipes Benth. subsp. filipes;
- Daviesia filipes subsp. terminalis Crisp & G.Chandler differs from the autonym in having flowers in racemes or Panicles on the ends of branches.

== Distribution and habitat ==
This species of pea grows in open forest or woodland from near the Windsor Tablelands to Inglewood in Queensland. Subspecies terminalis is restricted to the drier slopes of the ranges in the Wet Tropics.
