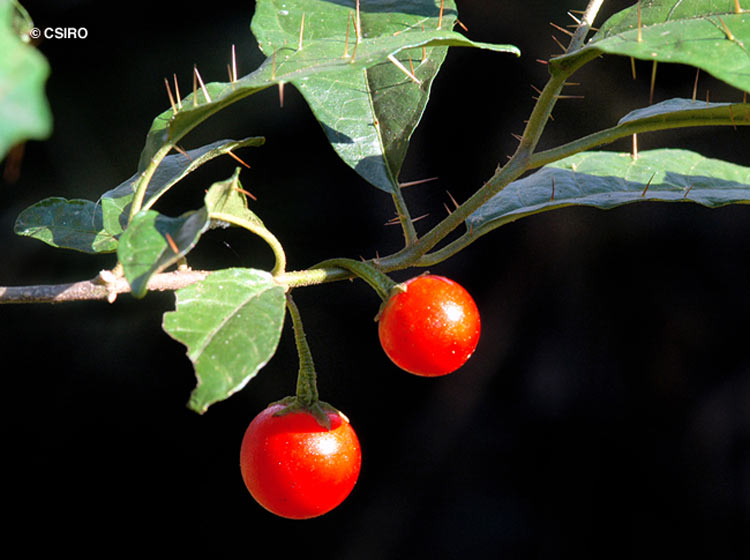
- Fruit

Conservation status
- Least Concern (NCA)

Scientific classification
- Kingdom: Plantae
- Clade: Tracheophytes
- Clade: Angiosperms
- Clade: Eudicots
- Clade: Asterids
- Order: Solanales
- Family: Solanaceae
- Genus: Solanum
- Species: S. macoorai

Binomial name
- Solanum macoorai F.M.Bailey

= Solanum macoorai =

Nightshade

Species of flowering plant

Solanum macoorai, commonly known as nightshade, is a species of plants in the tomato and tobacco family Solanaceae found only in the northern parts of Queensland, Australia. It is a shrub up to about 4 m (13 ft) tall, and the foliage is dark green or purple green. Spines may be present on the branches and leaves, and the twigs, petioles and lower surface of the leaves are hairy. Inflorescences have up to 12 mauve flowers about 3 cm (1.2 in) diameter, and the fruit is an orange or red berry about 15–20 mm (0.6–0.8 in) diameter. It occurs on the McIlwraith Range on Cape York Peninsula and on mostly higher ground (such as the Windsor and Atherton Tablelands in the Cairns region.

== Conservation ==
This species is listed as least concern under the Queensland Government's Nature Conservation Act. As of 10 January 2025, it has not been assessed by the International Union for Conservation of Nature (IUCN).
