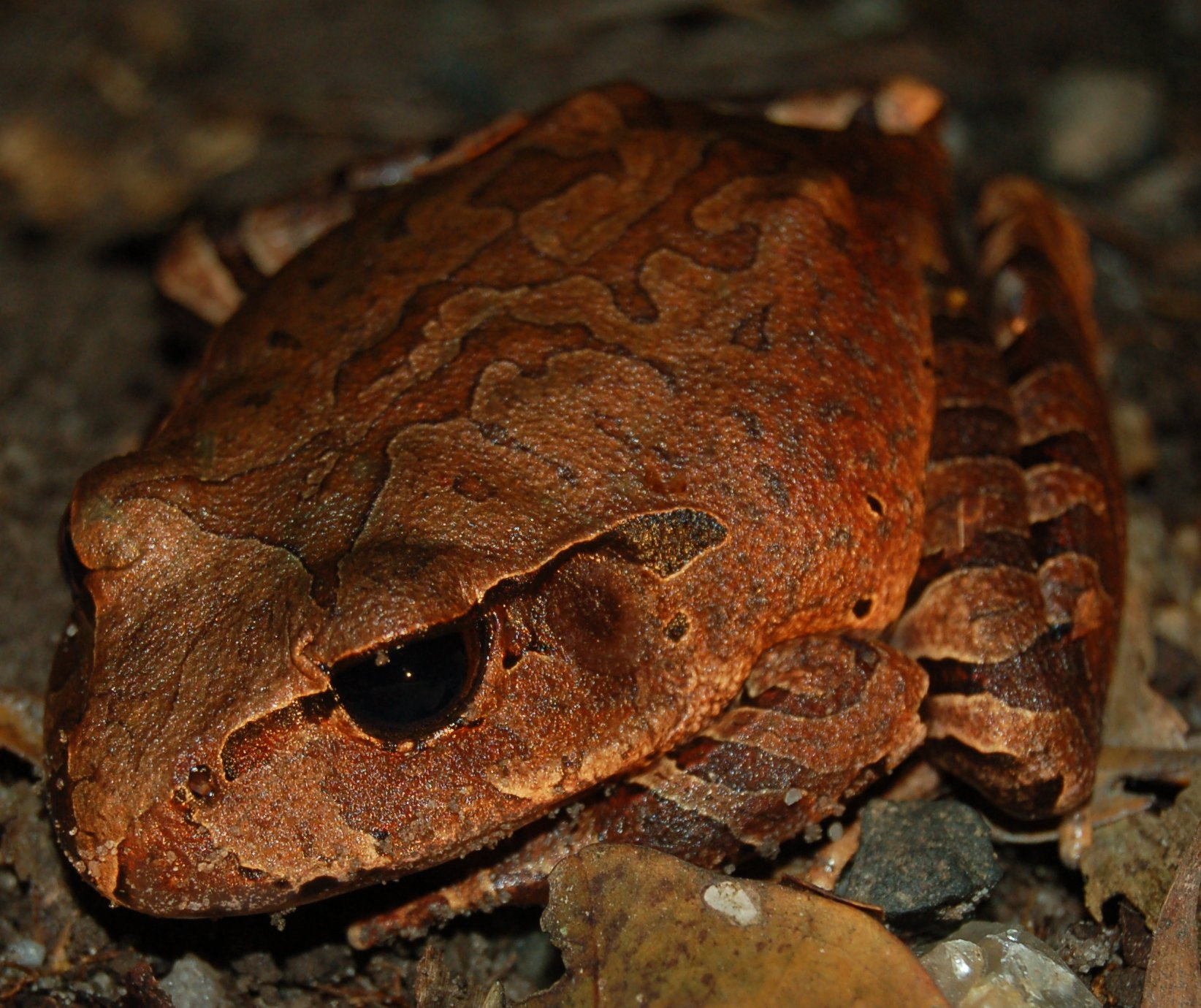

Conservation status
- Least Concern (IUCN 3.1)

Scientific classification
- Kingdom: Animalia
- Phylum: Chordata
- Class: Amphibia
- Order: Anura
- Family: Myobatrachidae
- Genus: Mixophyes
- Species: M. schevilli

Binomial name
- Mixophyes schevilli Loveridge, 1933
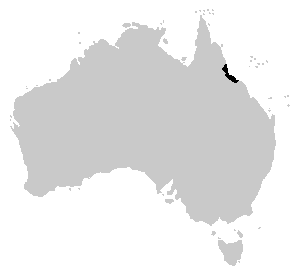
- Range of the Northern Barred Frog

= Northern barred frog =

Species of amphibian

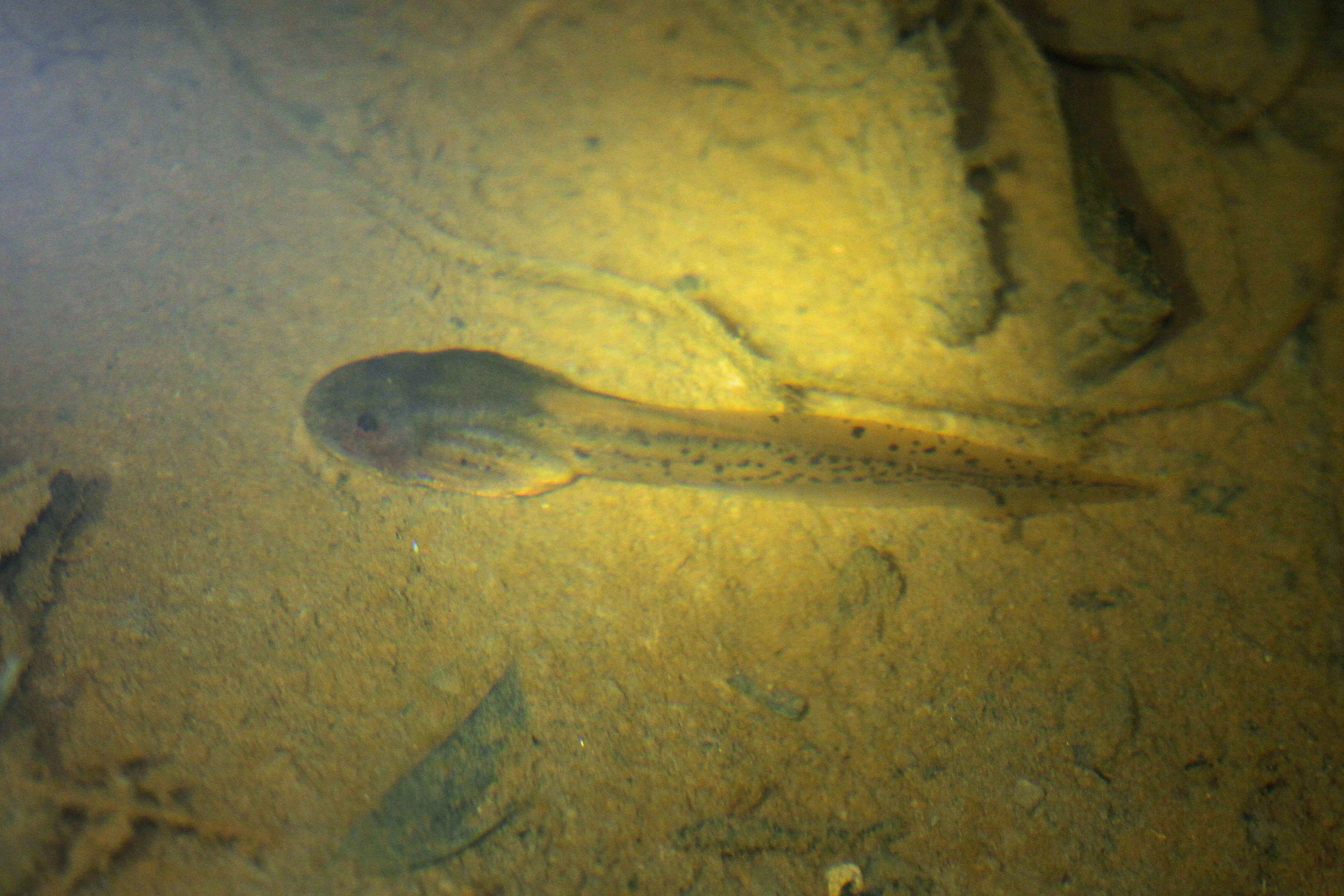
Tadpole

The northern barred frog (Mixophyes schevilli) is a large, ground dwelling frog native to tropical northern Queensland, Australia.

== Description ==
The Northern barred frog is a large frog, reaching a maximum length of 10 centimetres. It has powerful legs and arms, with a large head and large eyes. It has a brown or copper dorsal surface with irregular, darker blotches along the middle of its back. A dark line runs from the snout, through the eye, and over the tympanum to the top of the shoulder. Like all frogs of the genus Mixophyes, the Northern barred frog has bars running across its legs. The toes are fully webbed, the fingers are unwebbed, and the tympanum is visible.

== Ecology and behaviour ==
The Northern barred frog inhabits dense tropical rainforest, close to fast-flowing streams. It usually hides and hunts in leaf litter. Like Mixophyes iteratus and Mixophyes fasciolatus, this species lays its eggs on the banks of streams. Rain then washes them into the stream where the tadpoles hatch. The tadpoles are very large, reaching a length of 12.5 centimetres. The male will call high from the bank, with a deep "wahk" noise.

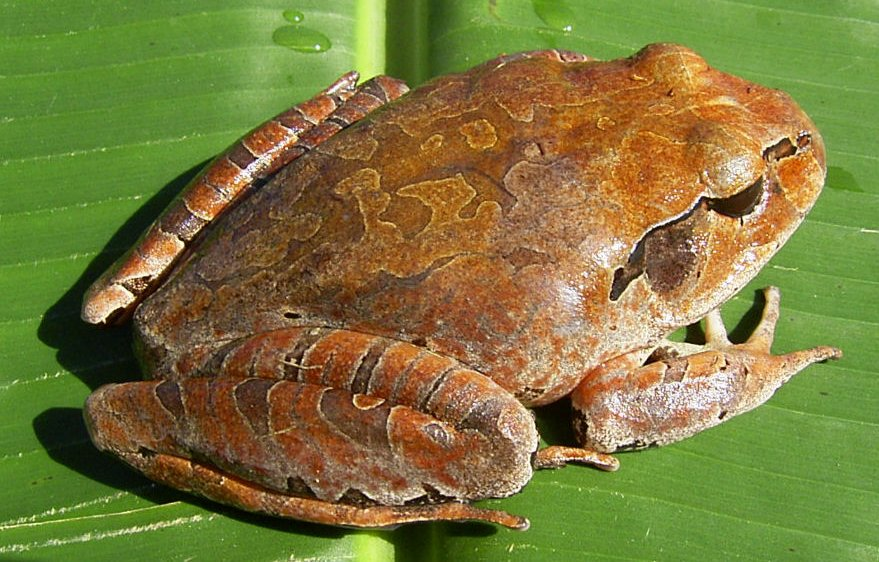
Dorsal patterning of the Northern Barred Frog
