= Corymbia rhodops =

Red-throated bloodwood

Conservation status
- Near Threatened (IUCN 3.1)

- Vulnerable (EPBC Act)

Scientific classification
- Kingdom: Plantae
- Clade: Tracheophytes
- Clade: Angiosperms
- Clade: Eudicots
- Clade: Rosids
- Order: Myrtales
- Family: Myrtaceae
- Genus: Corymbia
- Species: C. rhodops

Binomial name
- Corymbia rhodops (D.J.Carr & S.G.M.Carr) K.D.Hill & L.A.S.Johnson

Synonyms
- Eucalyptus rhodops D.J.Carr & S.G.M.Carr

Species of plant

Corymbia rhodops, commonly known as red-throated bloodwood, is a species of tree that is endemic to Queensland. It has rough, tessellated bark on the trunk and larger branches, lance-shaped adult leaves, flower buds in groups of seven, creamy white flowers with a red centre, and urn-shaped to barrel-shaped fruit.

== Description ==
Corymbia rhodops is a tree that typically grows to a height of 15 metres (49 ft) and forms a lignotuber. It has red-brown to grey-brown tessellated bark on the trunk and larger branches. Branches thinner than about 20–50 mm (0.79–1.97 in) are smooth-barked. Young plants and coppice regrowth have leaves that are glossy green above, paler below, elliptical to lance-shaped, 55–120 mm (2.2–4.7 in) long and 15–30 mm (0.59–1.18 in) wide. Adult leaves are arranged alternately, glossy green but paler on the lower surface, lance-shaped, 80–152 mm (3.1–6.0 in) long and 8–25 mm (0.31–0.98 in) wide, tapering to a petiole 8–25 mm (0.31–0.98 in) long. The flowers are borne on the ends of branchlets on a branched peduncle 4–25 mm (0.16–0.98 in) long, each branch of the peduncle with seven buds on pedicels 10–20 mm (0.39–0.79 in) long. Mature buds are pear-shaped to oval, 8–15 mm (0.31–0.59 in) long and 4–7 mm (0.16–0.28 in) wide with a conical to rounded operculum with a small point in the centre. Flowering occurs from December to February and the flowers have creamy white stamens with a red centre. The fruit is a woody urn-shaped to barrel-shaped capsule 17–28 mm (0.67–1.10 in) long and 12–20 mm (0.47–0.79 in) wide with the valves enclosed in the fruit.

== Taxonomy and naming ==
The red-throated bloodwood was first formally described in 1987 by Denis John Carr and Stella Grace Maisie Carr who gave it the name Eucalyptus rhodops and published the description in their book Eucalyptus II - The rubber cuticle, and other studies of the Corymbosae. They collected the type specimens near Watsonville in 1975. In 1995, Ken Hill and Lawrie Johnson changed the name to Corymbia rhodops, publishing the change in the journal Telopea.

== Distribution and habitat ==
This bloodwood is only known form a few small population on steep slopes on the western side of the Atherton Tableland and on the Windsor Tablelands.

== Conservation status ==
Corymbia rhodops was listed as vulnerable under the Environment Protection and Biodiversity Conservation Act 1999 in 2008. The plant has a limited range but the main identified threat to the tree is the destruction of habitat due to mining activity. It is also listed as "vulnerable" under the Queensland Government Nature Conservation Act 1992. The IUCN Red List assesses the species as Near Threatened.

== See also ==
- List of Corymbia species
