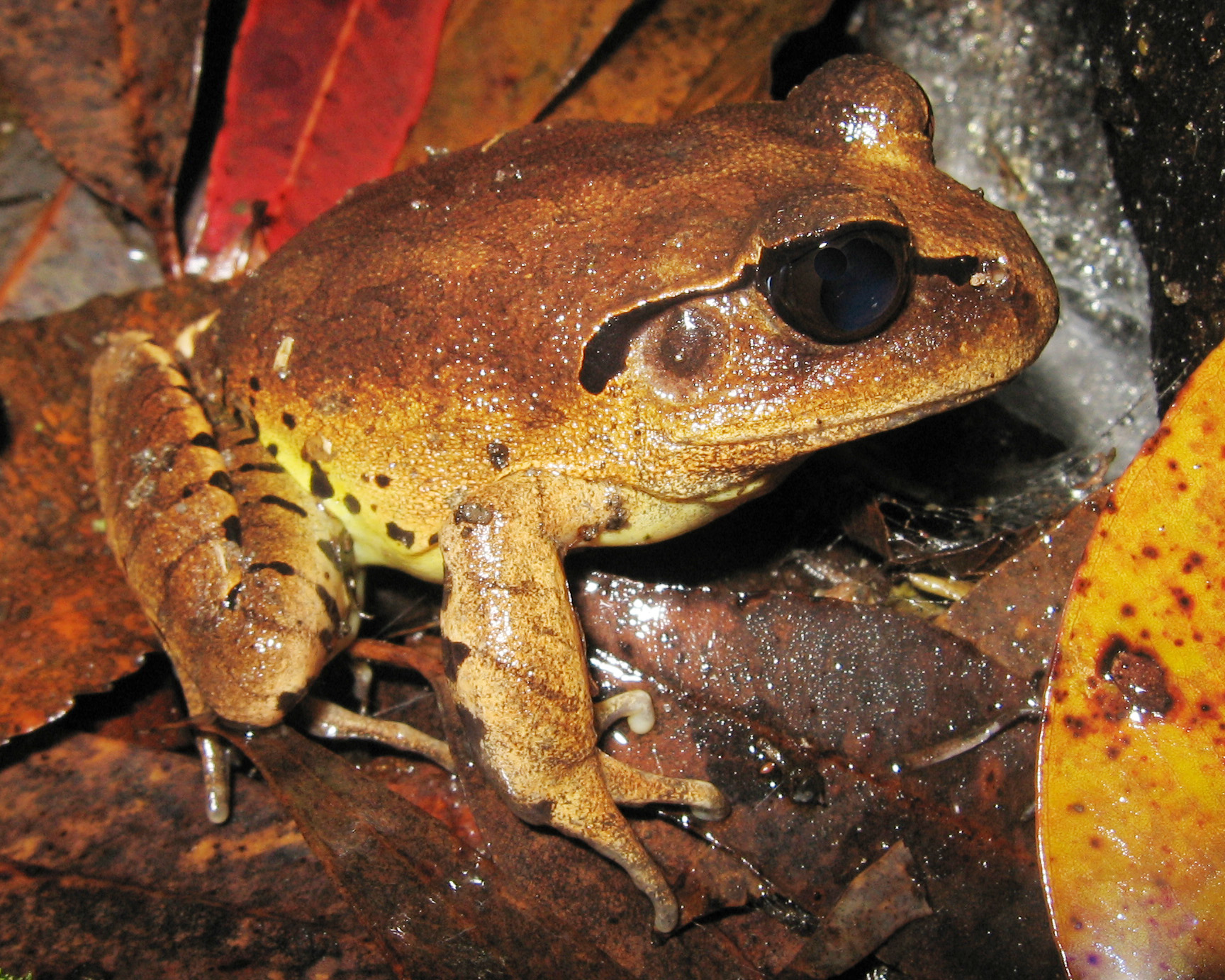
- Great barred frog (Mixophyes fasciolatus)

Scientific classification
- Domain: Eukaryota
- Kingdom: Animalia
- Phylum: Chordata
- Class: Amphibia
- Order: Anura
- Family: Myobatrachidae
- Genus: Mixophyes; Günther, 1864

Diversity
- 9 species

= Barred frog =

Barred frogs

Genus of amphibians

The barred frogs are a group of frogs in the genus Mixophyes. They are the largest of the Australian ground frogs, from the family Myobatrachidae.

The barred frogs are native to the eastern coast of Australia, with one species inhabiting New Guinea. They are restricted to rainforests and wet sclerophyll forests. They often habit under moist leaf litter, where they hunt small invertebrates. The males will also call from leaf litter close to a water source. It is suspected that the barred frog tadpoles eat carrion, if available, after both great barred frog (Mixophyes fasciolatus) and Fleay's barred frog (Mixophyes fleayi) tadpoles have both been observed eating carrion.

The genus consists of large frogs; the giant barred frog is the second largest frog in Australia. All species have visible tympanums, maxillary and vomerine teeth, powerful legs, and webbed feet.

== Species ==
Common name	Binomial name
Southern stuttering frog	Mixophyes australis Mahony, Bertozzi, Guzinski, Hines, and Donnellan, 2023
Stuttering frog	Mixophyes balbus (Straughan, 1968)
Carbine barred frog	Mixophyes carbinensis Mahony, Donnellan, Richards et al., 2006
Mottled barred frog	Mixophyes coggeri Mahony, Donnellan, Richards et al., 2006
Great barred frog	Mixophyes fasciolatus (Günther, 1864)
Fleay's barred frog	Mixophyes fleayi (Corben and Ingram, 1987)
Namosado barred frog	Mixophyes hihihorlo (Donnellan, Mahony, and Davies, 1990)
Giant barred frog	Mixophyes iteratus (Straughan, 1968)
Northern barred frog	Mixophyes schevilli (Loveridge, 1933)
