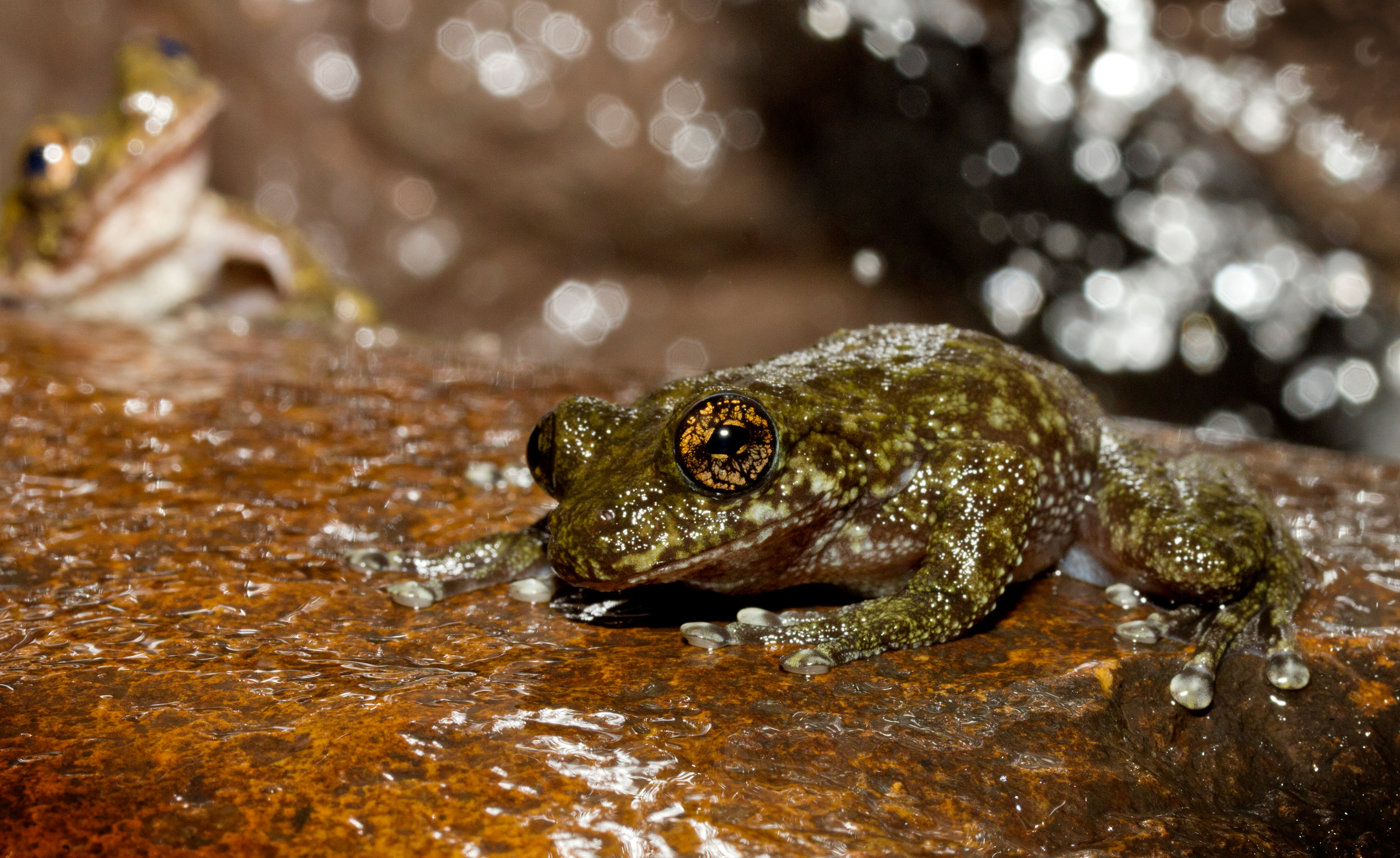
- Waterfall frog in Paluma, Queensland, Australia

Scientific classification
- Kingdom: Animalia
- Phylum: Chordata
- Class: Amphibia
- Order: Anura
- Family: Pelodryadidae
- Genus: Mosleyia; Wells & Wellington, 1985

Species
- Mosleyia lorica (Davies & McDonald, 1979); Mosleyia nannotis (Andersson, 1916); Mosleyia nyakalensis (Liem, 1974); Mosleyia rheocola (Liem, 1974)

= Mosleyia =

Genus of amphibians

Mosleyia is a genus of stream-dwelling frogs in the family Pelodryadidae. These frogs are native to the tropical rainforests of north-eastern Queensland Australia. Species in the genus were previously included within the wastebasket genus Litoria, but were separated into a new genus in 2025. They are medium sized frogs that breed in fast-flowing streams by gluing their eggs to the underside of rocks that are protected by the cascading water. Their tadpoles have adapted to this environment by evolving a strong suctoral disc on their mouths, which point downward so the can grip to the creek-bed in very fast-flowing water.

The genus is named for Geoff Mosley AM, the director of the Australian Conservation Foundation from 1973 to 1986.

== Diversity ==
The following species that are assigned to this genus are:

- Mosleyia lorica (Davies and McDonald, 1979)
- Mosleyia nannotis (Andersson, 1916)
- Mosleyia nyakalensis (Liem, 1974)
- Mosleyia rheocola (Liem, 1974)
