= Mottled barred frog =

Scientific classification
- Kingdom: Animalia
- Phylum: Chordata
- Class: Amphibia
- Order: Anura
- Family: Myobatrachidae
- Genus: Mixophyes
- Species: M. coggeri

Binomial name
- Mixophyes coggeri Mahony, Donnellan, Richards & McDonald, 2006

Species of Australian frog

The mottled barred frog (Mixophyes coggeri) is a species of large frog that is endemic to Australia. The specific epithet coggeri honours Professor Harold Cogger, formerly of the Australian Museum, for contributions to herpetology.

== Description ==
The species grows to about 105 mm in length (SVL). Colouration is brown on the back, with darker patches along the middle; the belly is yellow-white; the limbs have dark horizontal bars, with large cream blotches on the backs of the thighs. The fingers are unwebbed; the toes are webbed.

== Behaviour ==
The species breeds from spring to early autumn. Eggs are laid in stream pools and are then kicked out of the water by the female to stick to solid surfaces, such as earth banks or rock faces, above the pools. The tadpoles then drop into the water after hatching.

== Distribution and habitat ==
The species occurs throughout the Wet Tropics of north-eastern Queensland.
