= Mountain mist frog =

Conservation status
- Extinct (1990) (IUCN 3.1)

Scientific classification
- Kingdom: Animalia
- Phylum: Chordata
- Class: Amphibia
- Order: Anura
- Family: Pelodryadidae
- Genus: Mosleyia
- Species: †M. nyakalensis

Binomial name
- †Mosleyia nyakalensis (Liem, 1974)

Synonyms
- Litoria nyakalensis Liem, 1974; Ranoidea nyakalensis

Species of amphibian

The Mountain mist frog or Nyakala frog (Mosleyia nyakalensis) was a species of frog in the subfamily Pelodryadinae, endemic to Australia. Its natural habitats were subtropical or tropical moist lowland forests and rivers. It was threatened by habitat loss and potentially chytrid fungus, before being declared extinct in 2020.

== Taxonomy ==
The mountain mist frog was one of the four species of Australian torrent treefrogs that comprise the Mosleyia nannotis species group. The other species are the common mist frog, waterfall frog, and armoured mist frog.

== Conservation status ==
It was declared extinct in October 2020, a living specimen having not been seen since April 1990.
