= Southern stuttering frog =

Scientific classification
- Kingdom: Animalia
- Phylum: Chordata
- Class: Amphibia
- Order: Anura
- Family: Myobatrachidae
- Genus: Mixophyes
- Species: M. australis

Binomial name
- Mixophyes australis Mahony, Bertozzi, Guzinski, Hines, and Donnellan, 2023

Species of frog

The southern stuttering frog (Mixophyes australis) is a large species of frog endemic to south-eastern Australia. It is found in mid-eastern New South Wales and at least formerly Victoria, where it ranges from Carrai National Park south to East Gippsland. It inhabits temperate and subtropical rainforest, wet sclerophyll forest, and moist gullies in dry forests.

Long considered to comprise southern populations of the stuttering frog (M. balbus), it was not recognised as a new species until 2023, when a phylogenetic study found it to be deeply divergent from M. balbus and thus described it as a new species. The distributions of the northern and southern stuttering frogs are separated by the Macleay River.

This species has disappeared from two-thirds of its distribution, and thus qualifies for Endangered on the IUCN Red List. Populations south of Sydney have declined dramatically and the Victorian populations are believed to be extinct, although northern populations are thought to be stable. Unlike M. balbus, which is a high-altitude specialist, both upland and lowland populations of M. australis have been recorded.
