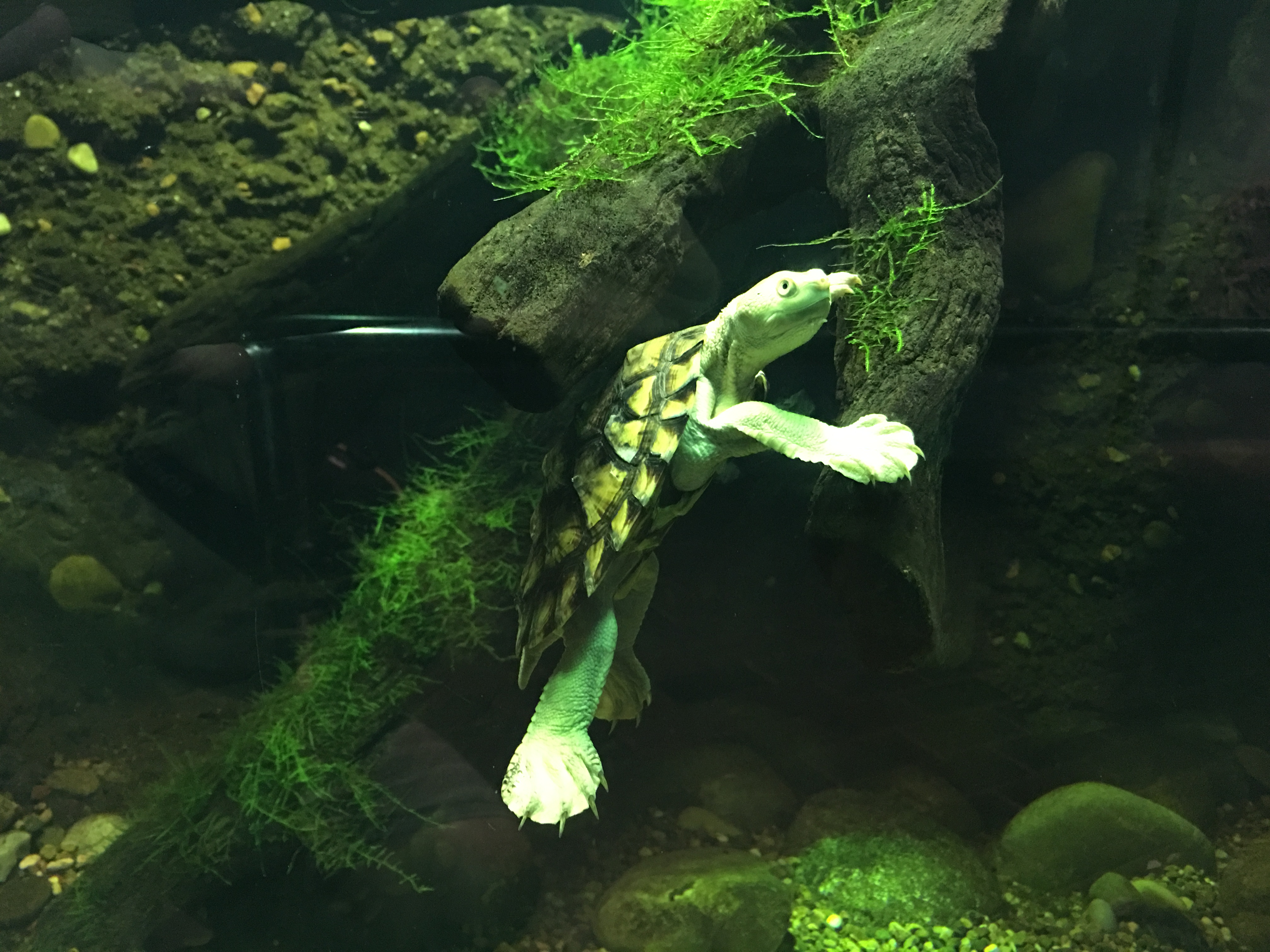

Conservation status
- Data Deficient (IUCN 3.1)

Scientific classification
- Kingdom: Animalia
- Phylum: Chordata
- Class: Reptilia
- Order: Testudines
- Suborder: Pleurodira
- Family: Chelidae
- Genus: Myuchelys
- Species: M. georgesi

Binomial name
- Myuchelys georgesi (Cann, 1997)

Synonyms
- Elseya sp. 3 1996 and 2000 IUCN Red Lists; Elseya georgesi Cann, 1997; Elseya latisternum georgesi — Artner, 2008; Myuchelys georgesi — S. Thomson & Georges, 2009; Wollumbinia georgesi (Cann, 1997)

= Bellinger River snapping turtle =

Species of turtle

The Bellinger River turtle (Myuchelys georgesi), or Bellinger River saw-shelled turtle, is a species of turtle in the family Chelidae. The species is of moderate size, with a straight-line carapace length to 240 mm (9.4 in) in females, and 185 mm (7.3 in) in males. It is endemic to Australia with a highly restricted distribution to the small coastal drainage of the Bellinger River in New South Wales.

In the past the species was considered locally abundant. The species' preferred habitat is the deeper pools of the clear-water upstream reaches of the river, where water flows continuously in most months over a bedrock basement and a stream bed of boulders, pebbles, and gravel. A captive breeding program has been under way since a 2015 virus outbreak came close to wiping out the entire species. Most remaining individuals are currently housed in quarantine, though a small number have been reintroduced to the original habitat.

== Etymology ==
The specific name, georgesi, is in honour of Australian herpetologist Arthur Georges.

== Geographic range ==
M. georgesi is found in the Bellinger River and its tributaries, mid-eastern New South Wales, Australia.

== Habitat ==
The preferred habitat of M. georgesi is the deeper pools of the clear-water upstream reaches of the river, where the water flows continuously in most months over a bedrock basement and a boulder, pebble and gravel bed. The species takes advantage of the highly oxygenated water with low particulate load by supplementing its oxygen uptake through cloacal breathing.

== Diet ==
M. georgesi is essentially an omnivore, with tendencies leaning toward carnivory. A high proportion of its food comes from benthic macro-invertebrate communities that are relatively sedentary and live in immediate association with the substratum, but with some terrestrial fruit and aquatic vegetation eaten.

== Reproduction ==
M. georgesi nests from October to December, laying 10-15 oblong white hard-shelled eggs.

== Conservation status ==
Within the Bellinger drainage, a very restricted range, M. georgesi was formerly widely distributed and locally abundant, with threats to its persistence including habitat modification and loss of native riparian vegetation, associated turbidification and sedimentation, predation by the introduced European fox, and competition with the recently introduced turtle Emydura macquarii.

In 2015, more than 90% of the adult population was wiped out by a virus, rendering the animal functionally extinct in the wild; a captive breeding program, with limited reintroduction, is working to re-establish a healthy population. Partially as a result of the extreme population decline caused by the virus (with a 97% mortality rate), the species was listed as critically endangered by the New South Wales Department of Planning and Environment in 2016. As of November 2022, while there is still no cure for the virus, the captive breeding program undertaken by Taronga Zoo and Symbio Wildlife Park has resulted in the release of 82 juvenile turtles back into the wild.

== Gallery ==
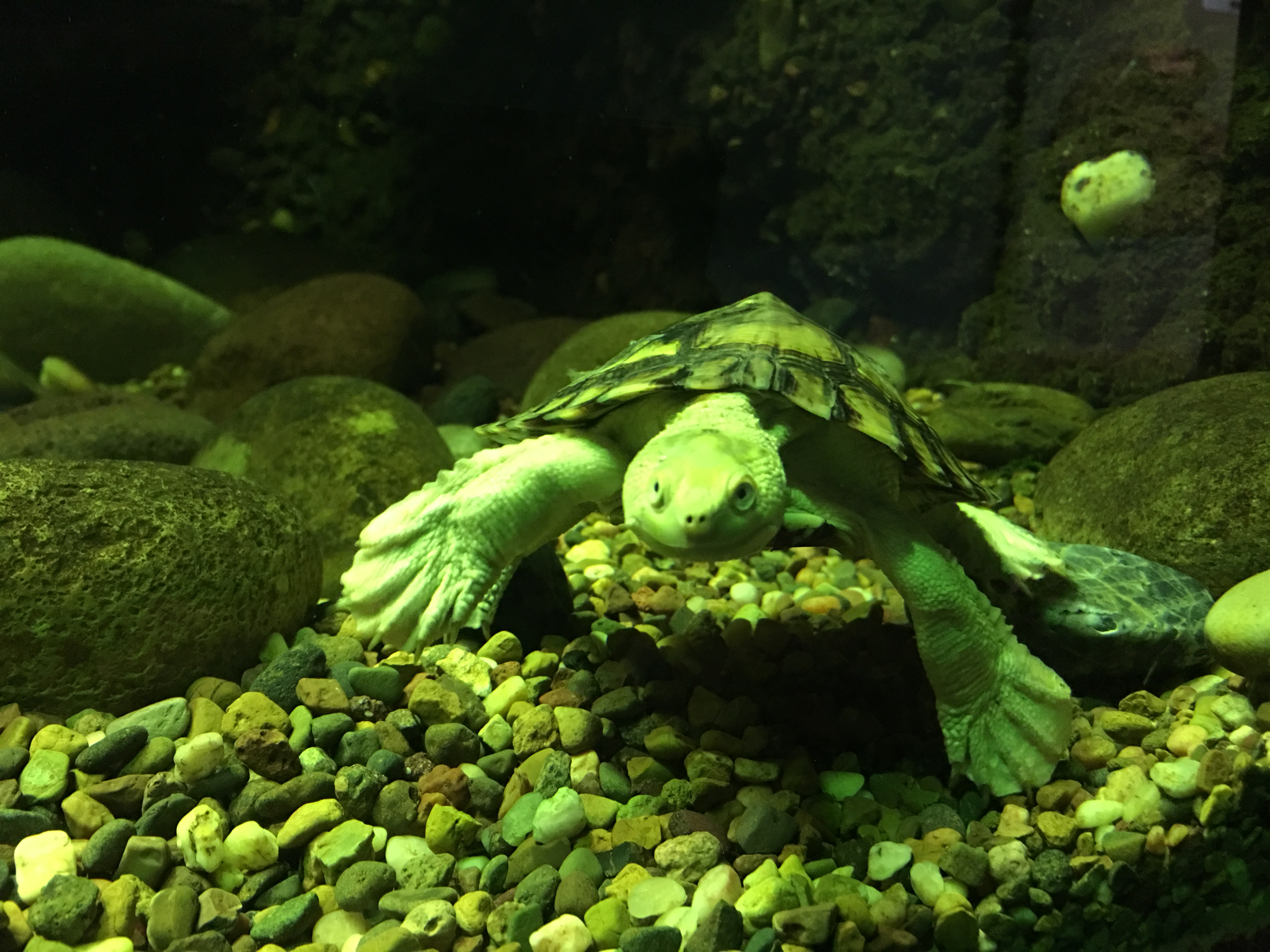
Front view

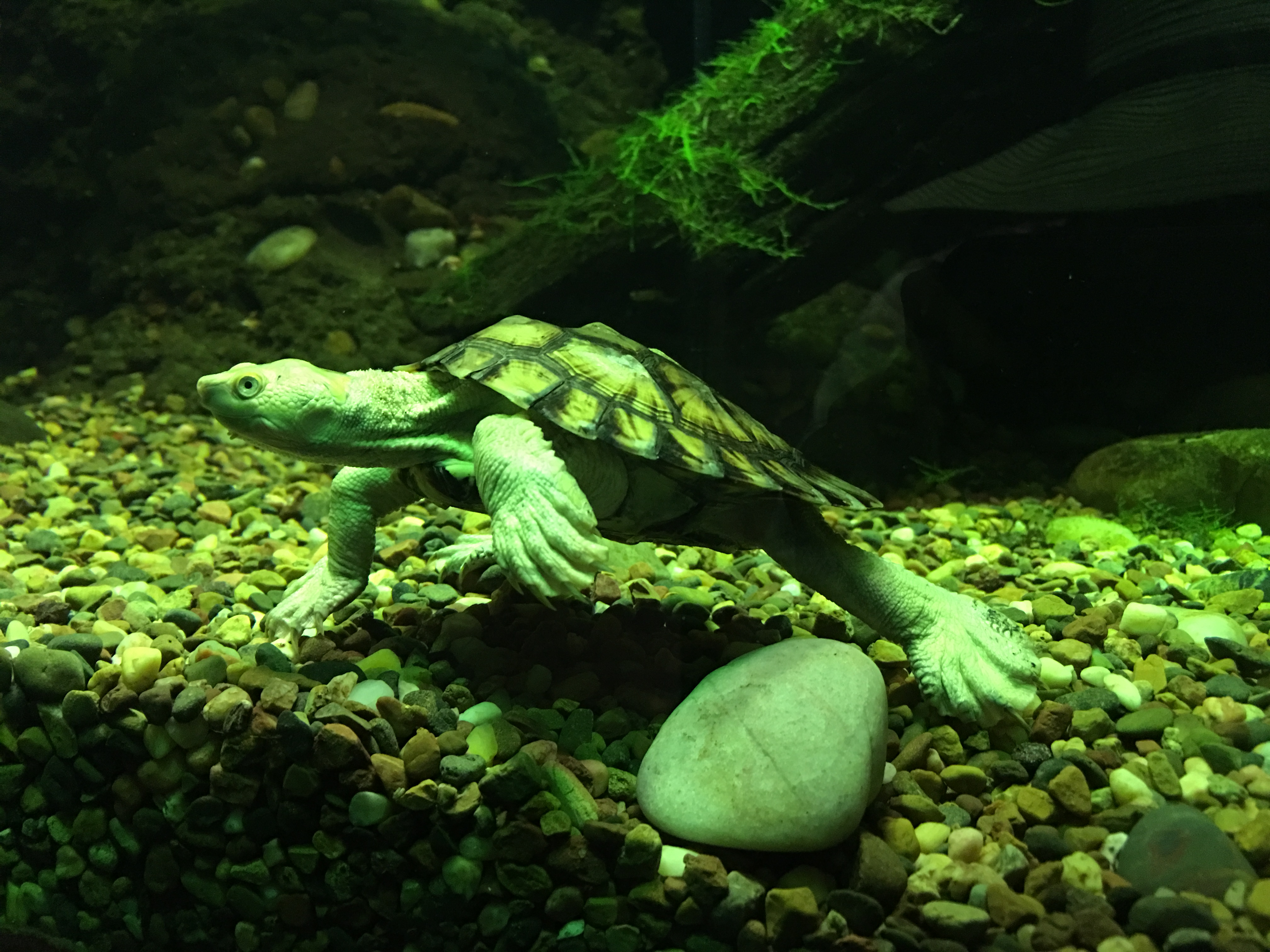
Side view

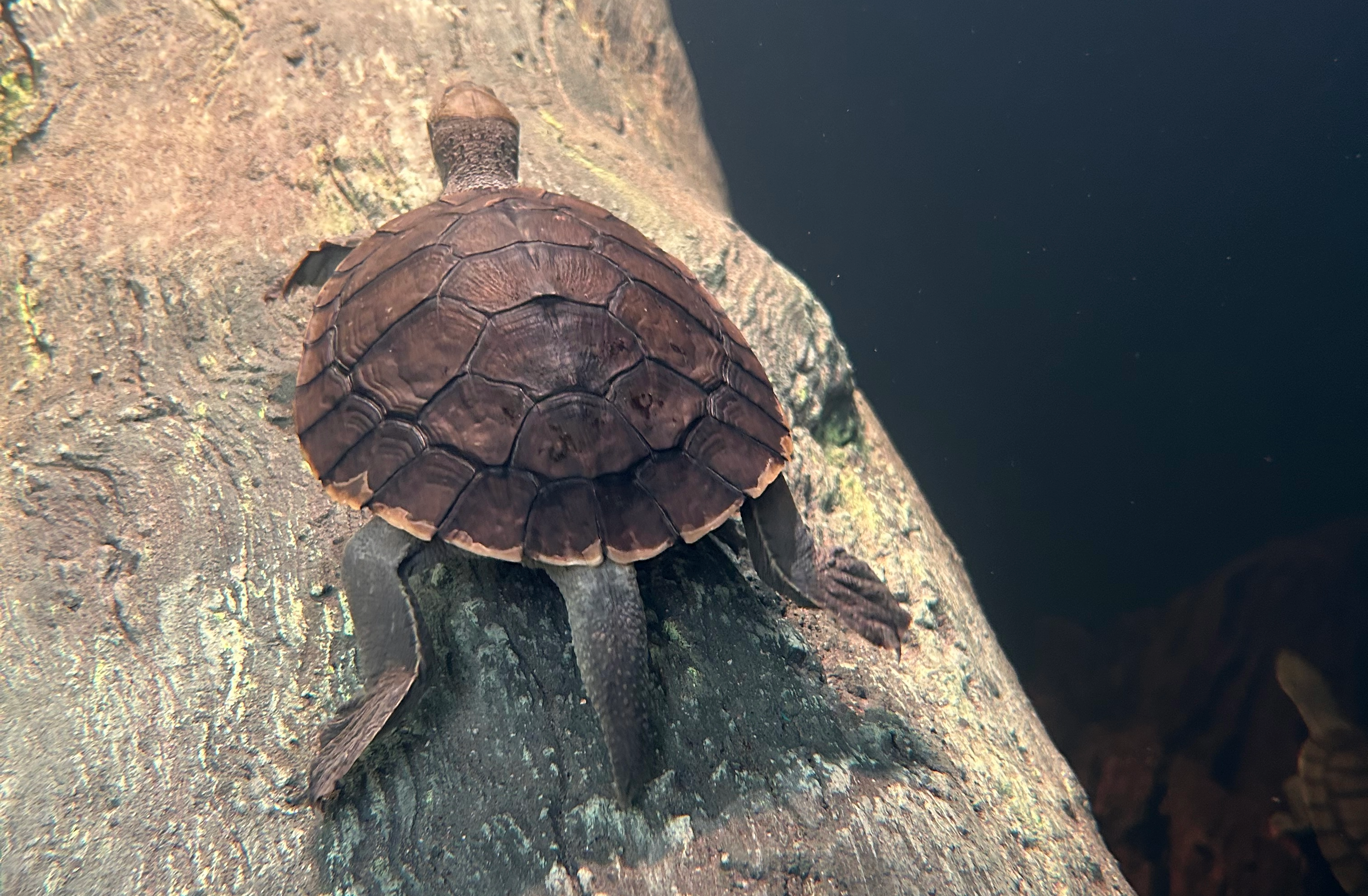
Back view
