= Mixophyes hihihorlo =

Conservation status
- Data Deficient (IUCN 3.1)

Scientific classification
- Kingdom: Animalia
- Phylum: Chordata
- Class: Amphibia
- Order: Anura
- Family: Myobatrachidae
- Genus: Mixophyes
- Species: M. hihihorlo

Binomial name
- Mixophyes hihihorlo Donnellan, Mahony & Davies, 1990

Species of frog

Mixophyes hihihorlo, also known as the Namosado barred frog, is a species of frog in the family Myobatrachidae. It is endemic to eastern New Guinea. Its natural habitats are subtropical or tropical moist montane forests.
