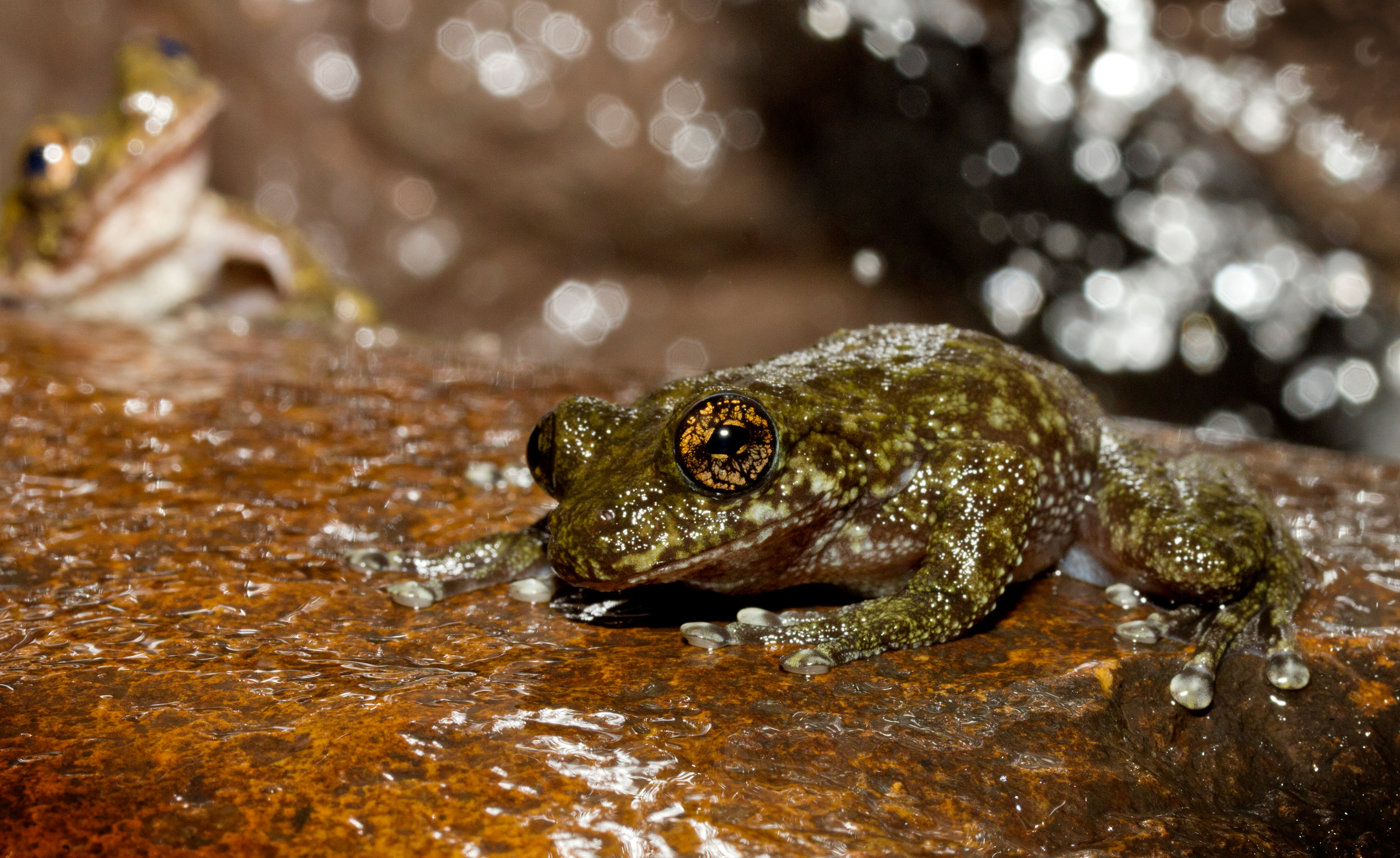
- In Paluma, Queensland.

Conservation status
- Least Concern (IUCN 3.1)

- Delisted (EPBC Act)

Scientific classification
- Kingdom: Animalia
- Phylum: Chordata
- Class: Amphibia
- Order: Anura
- Family: Pelodryadidae
- Genus: Mosleyia
- Species: M. nannotis

Binomial name
- Mosleyia nannotis (Andersson, 1916)

Synonyms
- Hyla nannotis Andersson, 1916; Litoria nannotis (Andersson, 1916); Ranoidea nannotis Wells and Wellington, 1985

= Waterfall frog =

Species of amphibian

The Australian waterfall frog (Mosleyia nannotis), also known as the torrent tree frog is a species of tree frog endemic to Far North Queensland, Australia.

== Taxonomy ==
The Australian waterfall frog was first described as Hyla nannotis by Swedish herpetologist Lars Gabriel Andersson in 1916. The holotype specimen is a male collected in Tully River in North Queensland in April 1913.

In 2025 it was transferred to the genus Mosleyia along with the mountain mist frog (M. nyakalensis), common mist frog (M. rheocola) and the armoured mist frog (M. lorica).

== Description ==
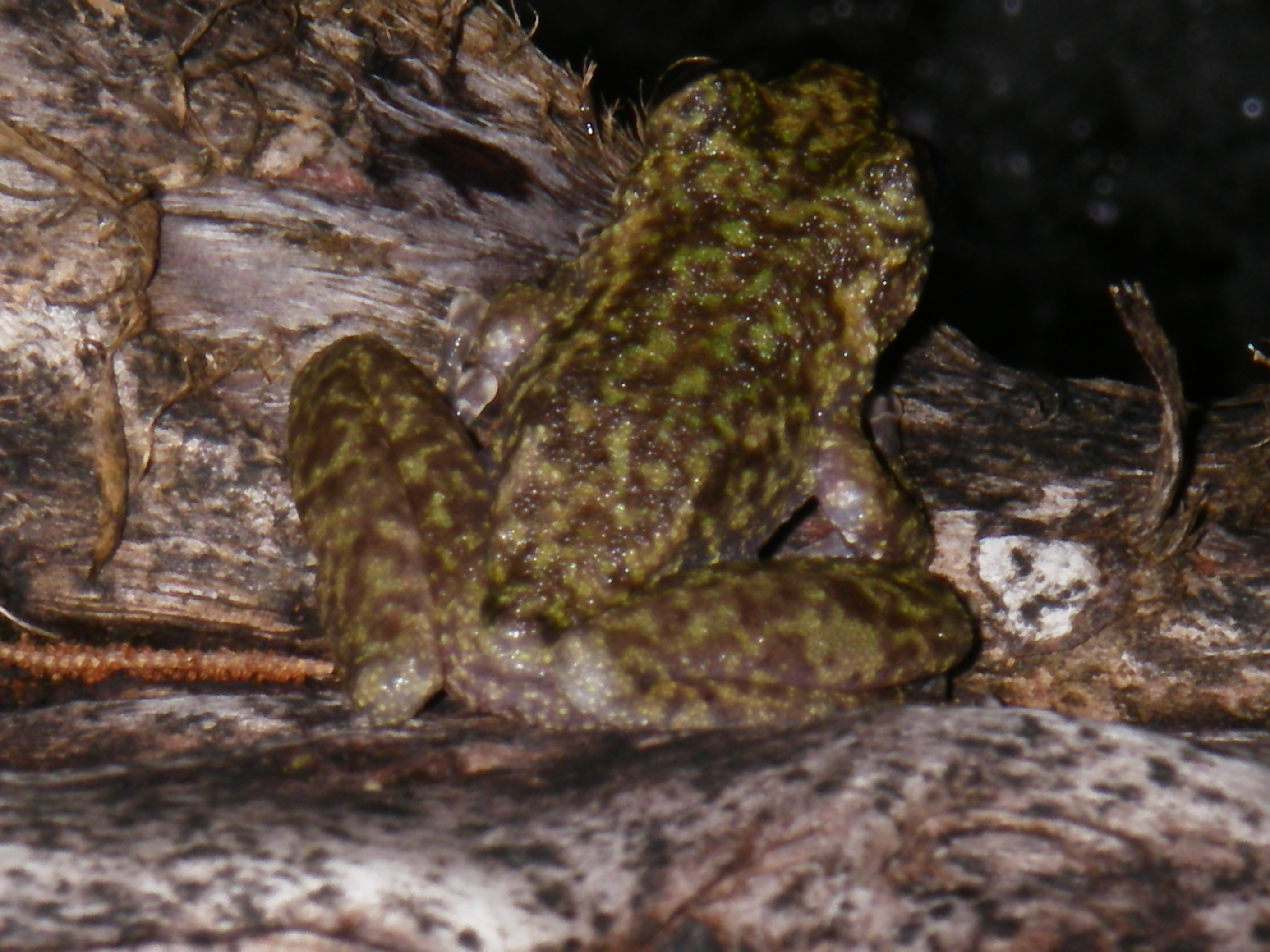
Dorsal view of a waterfall frog in Far North Queensland, Australia

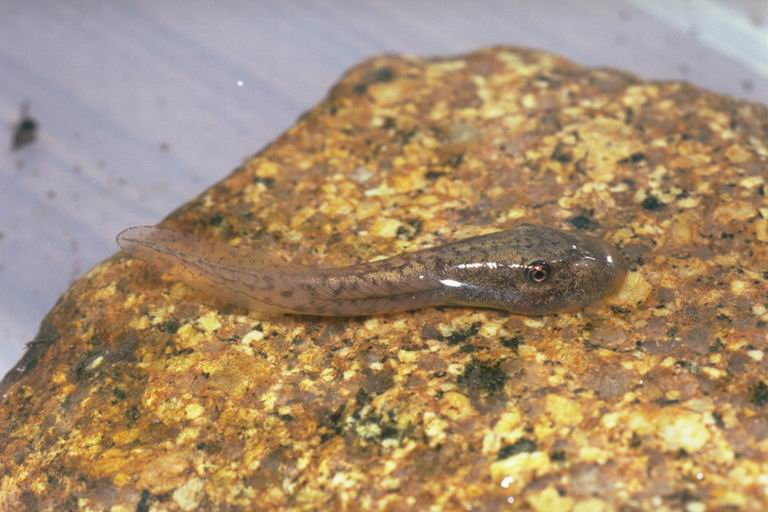
Tadpole

The Australian waterfall frog is a large, robust species, typically measuring 4–5.5 cm (1.6–2.2 in) from snout to vent. Adult males are 4–4.8 cm (1.6–1.9 in) long. Adult females are slightly larger at 4.9–5.5 cm (1.9–2.2 in) long. The body size of adult frogs varies based on geographical distribution, with the largest frogs found in the Carbine Tableland population with some individuals reaching up to 6 cm (2.4 in) long. It is the largest member of its genus, Mosleyia.

The dorsal surface is mottled with puck brown. The patterning on the back is similar to its habitat, allowing for effective camouflage against granite. The ventral surface is bright orange, green, and pink in colour, and granular. The posterior ventral surface is translucent, showing internal parts.

The toe pads of M. nannotis are very large in comparison to toe width, to aid in gripping to rocks in the rapids. The nuptial pads of breeding males are also large, covering the entire inner surface of the thumb, with spines also present on the arms and chest. The tympanum is not visible, the fingers are partially webbed, and the toes are completely webbed.

Like many other stream-dwelling frogs, waterfall frogs lack vocal sacs. Their calls are described as short, harsh growls and 'crawk-crawk-crawk' calls.

The tadpoles of the waterfall frog are one of the only Australian frog species which are highly adapted to living in fast-flowing waters. They have a streamlined body, a powerful tail and sucker-like mouthparts which allow them to grip onto underwater surfaces to avoid being swept away by the current. They grow up to 51 mm (2.0 in) long before they metamorphise into froglets.

== Ecology and behavior ==
The waterfall frog is a stream-dwelling frog native to tropical north Queensland, from Paluma to Cooktown, notable in the Mt. Carbine uplands. It is found at altitudes between 180 and 3,000 m (590 and 9,840 ft). It has undergone large declines in high-altitude areas (likely from chytridiomycosis), with many populations completely extinct. It is, however, stable in lowland areas.

== Conservation ==
Formerly listed as endangered, this species is listed as least concern on the IUCN Red List of Threatened Species and has been removed from the Environment Protection and Biodiversity Conservation Act 1999 List of Threatened Fauna.

The population of the Australian waterfall frog was first observed to be declining in the 1990s. Prior to its decline, it was recorded as being widespread throughout the Wet Tropics Biogeographical Region of far-northern Queensland. Surveys undertaken during the summer of 1991 and 1992 between Townsville and Cooktown recorded the complete absence of frogs in all but one of the 21 sites upland from the Daintree River where the species was known to occur. It was found to still be present in all of the lowland sites and in upland sites north of the river. Rapid population declines of only 2-3 months were observed in frog populations in upland rainforest habitat between the Daintree and Bloomfield Rivers in 1993 and north of the Bloomfield River in 1994. It was no longer being found in most upland sites above 400 m (1,300 ft) above sea level, with only lowland populations (at 180–400 m (590–1,310 ft) asl) remaining stable. The population decline was significant enough to warrant the species a threatened listing and in 1996, the IUCN listed the species as endangered.

The reason for this decline was unknown for many years. It was highly unlikely to be a result of habitat destruction since the sites where the frogs were disappearing from were unaltered and pristine and the Wet Tropics World Heritage Area which encompasses the species' distribution has remained protected since 1988. A study published in Pacific Conservation Biology in 1993 ruled out the possibility of drought, floods or changes to water quality (such as changes to pH and dissolved oxygen levels, conductivity and metal ions) as the main cause of decline.

Multiple studies have provided significant evidence to suggest the amphibian chytrid fungus (Batrachochytrium dendrobatidis) as the leading cause of the decline.
