= Armoured frog =

Conservation status
- Critically Endangered (IUCN 3.1)

Scientific classification
- Kingdom: Animalia
- Phylum: Chordata
- Class: Amphibia
- Order: Anura
- Family: Pelodryadidae
- Genus: Mosleyia
- Species: M. lorica

Binomial name
- Mosleyia lorica (Davies and McDonald, 1979)
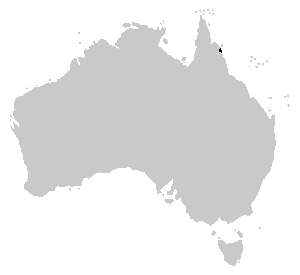
- Distribution of the Armoured Frog, pre-2008 rediscovery

Synonyms
- Litoria lorica (Davies and McDonald, 1979); Pengilleyia lorica (Wells and Wellington, 1985); Ranoidea lorica (Davies and McDonald, 1979)

Species of amphibian

The armoured frog (Mosleyia lorica), or armoured mist frog, is a species of tree frog in the torrent frog complex, a group restricted to north-eastern Queensland, Australia.

== Taxonomy ==
The armoured mist frog is one of the four species of Australian torrent treefrogs that comprise the Mosleyia nannotis species group. The other species are the mountain mist frog, waterfall frog, and common mist frog.

== Description ==
M. lorica is a small tree frog, growing up to 37 mm (1.5 in) in length. It is grey or grey-brown on the dorsal surface and white on the ventral surface. The skin is tubercular on the dorsal surface, prominently on the eyelids and around the tympanum. Fingers are half webbed and toes are fully webbed, both having well-developed discs. The tympanum is small and indistinct, and a vocal sac is not present. Males have black, spiny nuptial pads on their thumbs and "accessory spines" on their chests. These spines are used in amplexus by the males to attain a better grip on the females.

== Distribution ==
This species was first discovered in 1976 and is known from four localities: Alexandra Creek, Hilda Creek (Cape Tribulation NP), Roaring Meg Cascades, and Mossman Bluff Creek (Daintree NP), north-eastern Queensland—between 640 and 1,000 m (2,100 and 3,280 ft) in altitude—and the historical extent of the species only was 120 km^{2} (46 sq mi). Despite once being relatively common, the armoured frog has fallen into rapid decline, and was not seen from 1991 until 2008, when a small population was rediscovered and confirmed to be of this species.

== Behaviour and ecology ==
This species is associated with fast-flowing creeks and streams in rainforests in northern Queensland. The call for this species is unknown, but is likely to be similar to that of the closely related waterfall frog, (Litoria nannotis). Tadpoles of this species are undescribed, although they would theoretically look similar to those of L. nannotis–with a large oral disc and a streamlined body, an adaptation to fast-flowing streams.

== Conservation status ==
This species, along with Taudactylus rheophilus, Taudactylus acutirostris, and some closely related species (including Mosleyia nannotis, Mosleyia nyakalensis, and Mosleyia rheocola) have also declined in flowing creeks in highland rainforests in the same general area inhabited by M. lorica around the early 1990s. The reason for decline of these species is not known, but the disease caused by chytrid fungus may be a factor. The relocated population was found to be infected with the fungus, but seems to have acquired some degree of resistance.

It is listed as Critically Endangered on the IUCN Red List, and as Endangered under Queensland's Nature Conservation Act 1992.
