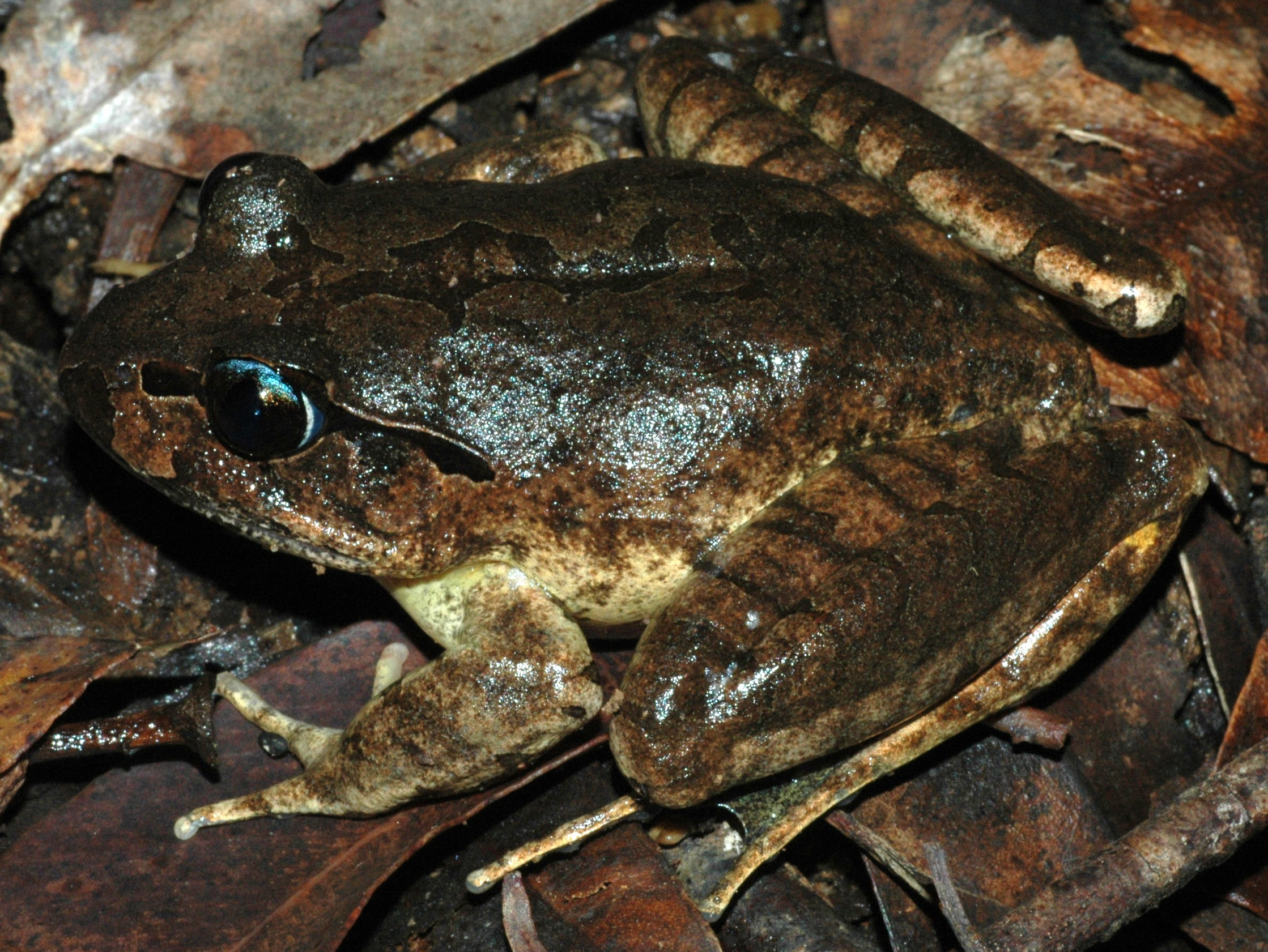

Conservation status
- Vulnerable (IUCN 3.1)

Scientific classification
- Kingdom: Animalia
- Phylum: Chordata
- Class: Amphibia
- Order: Anura
- Family: Myobatrachidae
- Genus: Mixophyes
- Species: M. balbus

Binomial name
- Mixophyes balbus Straughan, 1968
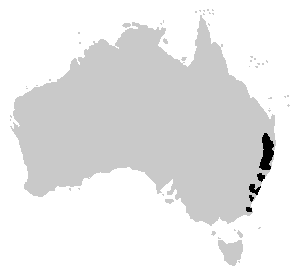
- Stuttering frog range (includes M. australis)

= Stuttering frog =

Species of amphibian

The stuttering frog (Mixophyes balbus) is a large species of frog that inhabits temperate and sub-tropical rainforest and wet sclerophyll forest in Australia.

== Distribution ==
Until 2023, this species was thought conspecific with the southern stuttering frog (M. australis). Following taxonomic revision, this species is thought to be endemic to New South Wales, ranging from the Timbarra River near Drake, south to the northern Macleay River catchment. It occurs at altitudes between 600 m and 1400 m. Unlike M. australis, the species occurs only at high altitudes.

== Description ==
This frog can reach up to 80 mm in length. Its dorsal surface is brown and diffuses laterally to merge with a pale yellow on the ventral surface. An irregular shaped blotch starts between the eyes and finishes mid-dorsal and may be broken up. There is a dark head stripe that starts before the nostril as a triangle, it then continues from the nostril to the eye, then from the eye over the tympanum and finishes over the shoulder. The tympanum is slightly oval shaped and distinct. The iris is light blue, diffusing into gold above the pupil and dark brown below. The 4-6 bars on the hind limbs are pale and indistinct. Toes are three quarters webbed and fingers are free from webbing.

== Ecology and behaviour ==
This species is associated with flowing creeks and streams in temperate and sub-tropical rainforest, wet sclerophyll forest and Antarctic beech forests. The call is a "kook kook kook kra-a-ak kruk kruk" - lasting one to two seconds. The male calls while next to the stream, often on leaf litter, and spawn is deposited in dug-out, gravel nests in shallow, flowing water. Tadpoles usually reach 65 mm but may be up to 80 mm in length. Tadpoles are dark brown or black with large spots and flecks on the tail. Metamorphosis may take 15 months and the metamorphs closely resemble the adults, but have less distinct dorsal pattern and a rusty red iris.

== Similar species ==
This frog can be distinguished from all other Mixophyes species by the blue crescent in the upper iris, except for Mixophyes fleayi. It can be distinguished from Mixophyes fleayi by the lack of mottling on the flanks.

== Status ==
Due to its small range following the recent taxonomic revision, it has been suggested that this species be reclassified as Endangered on the IUCN Red List. This species has a fragmented range and has suffered significant declines in the past, although populations appear to have stabilized in recent decades.
