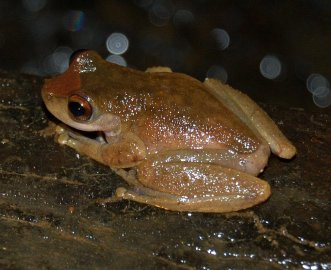

Conservation status
- Near Threatened (IUCN 3.1)

Scientific classification
- Kingdom: Animalia
- Phylum: Chordata
- Class: Amphibia
- Order: Anura
- Family: Pelodryadidae
- Genus: Mosleyia
- Species: M. rheocola

Binomial name
- Mosleyia rheocola (Liem, 1974)

Synonyms
- Litoria rheocola Liem, 1974; Ranoidea rheocola Liem, 1974

= Common mist frog =

Species of amphibian

The common mist frog (Mosleyia rheocola) is a species of tree frog native to north-eastern Queensland, Australia. It is a medium-sized frog and a member of the Australian torrent treefrog group. The common mist frog is found in remote, mountainous areas, and near rocky, fast-flowing rainforest streams such as those in north-eastern Queensland, Australia. They are generally sedentary frogs, and remain in the stream environments that they are born into, preferring sections of the stream with riffles, many rocks, and overhanging vegetation.

== Taxonomy ==
The common mist frog is one of the four species of Australian torrent treefrogs that comprise the Mosleyia nannotis species group. The other species are the mountain mist frog, waterfall frog, and armoured mist frog.

== Description ==
Fully grown common mist frogs can measure anywhere from 27 to 41 millimetres (1.1 to 1.6 in) in length and often weigh between 1.2 and 4.5 grams. The common mist frog displays sexual dimorphism, meaning that one sex is larger in size than the other, in this case, the females are larger than males. Whereas males measure at around 31 mm (1.2 in) in length, the female mist frog is on average 36 mm (1.4 in) long. Similarly, the average adult male mist frog weighs an average of 2.0 grams while the adult female mist frog averages around 3.1 grams.

The common mist frog is a dull grey or brown color in appearance, with tubercles (small rounded protrusions) and dark, irregular markings on its dorsal surface. The frog's underside is characterized by granular white skin. The common mist frog will also often have a distinct line between its eyes. Like many other frogs, the mist frog's fingers are partly webbed, with webbing reaching the second-subarticular tubercle at the end of the first phalanx, and its toes are completely webbed. Both their fingers and toes have large discs. The tympanum (outer ear) is covered by a layer of skin, but is still visible. common mist frogs have a relatively slender build and possess a protruding, triangular snout.

The common mist frog has obscure dark bands that run along the side of its snout from the eye and ear to the shoulder. The male nuptial pads are small and unlike other male torrent treefrogs, they do not have enlarged arms. Additionally, the tips of their snouts are pointed.

The tadpoles have large mouthparts that they use to cling to nearby rocks. They also possess muscular tails that aid in swimming against a current. Common mist frog tadpoles have been described as torrent-dwelling, flat bodied, and with large suctorial mouthparts.

The mating call is a regular, repeated, long-drawn single note, sounding like a rather nasal "wreek wreek wreek". These calls have a low audio frequency, with an average dominant frequency of around 2.5 kHz.

== Distribution and habitat ==
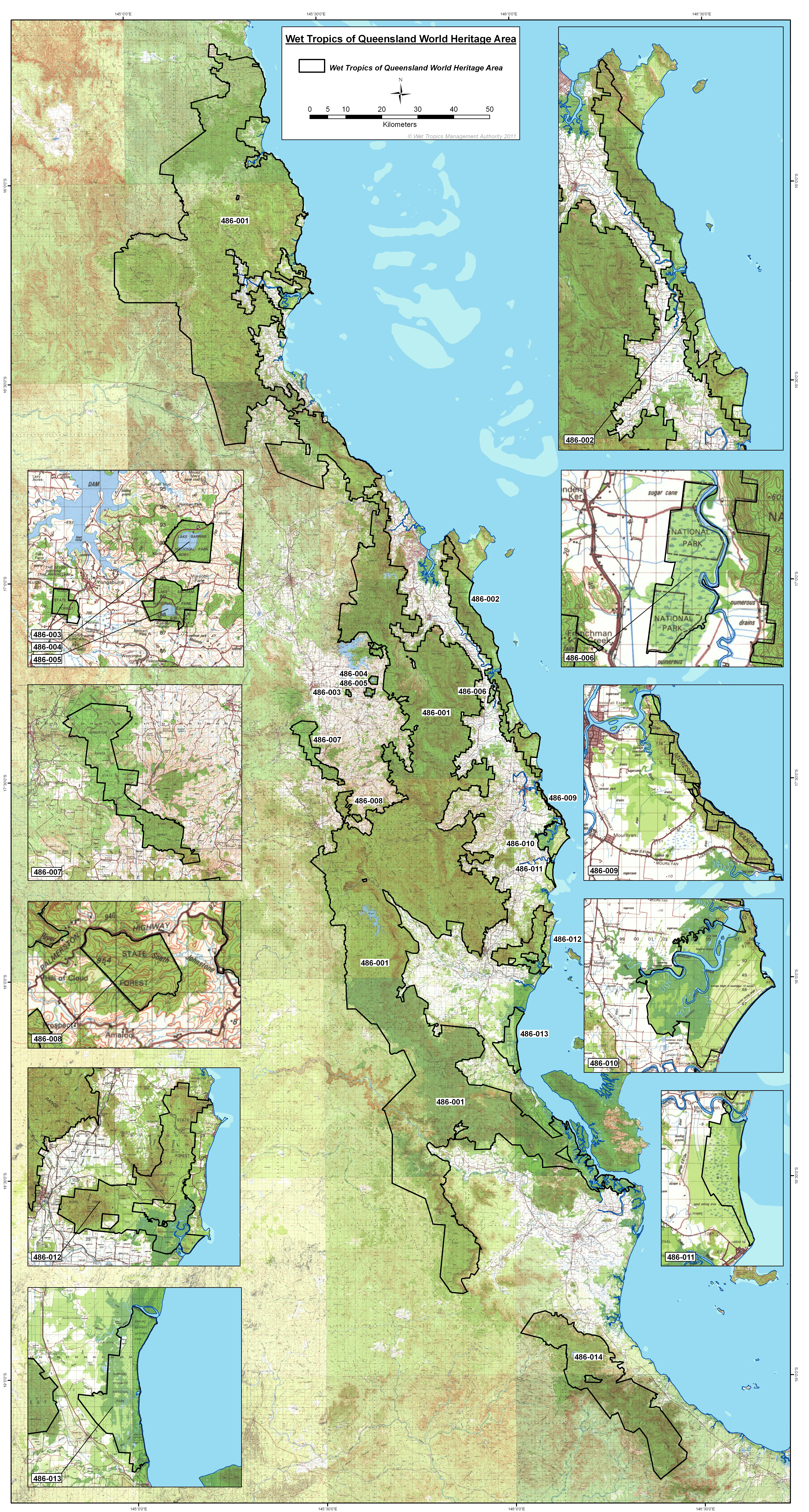
Map of the Wet Tropics of Queensland

The common mist frog can be found throughout the Wet Tropics of Queensland, from north of Ingham to the Big Tableland south of Cooktown, as well as from the Broadwater Creek National Park to Amos Bay, northern Queensland. The common mist frog inhabits the riparian zone of fast-flowing streams in rainforests and wet sclerophyll forests of eastern tropical North Queensland. They are found primarily along rainforest streams, near riffles, cascades, and waterfalls, as well as in wet sclerophyll forests. They have been observed perching on vegetation, rocks, logs, and roots along streams. During the day, they can also be found in piles of leaves beside flowing streams. They also have been found inhabiting similar streamside microhabitats outside of rainforests.

The common mist frog formerly inhabited areas from sea level to mountainous areas reaching an elevation of 1,200 metres (3,940 ft). Since 1990 however, the mist frog can no longer be found above 600 metres (1,970 ft) and is rare in habitats above 400 metres (1,310 ft) elevation. The common mist frog's area of occupancy has now been restricted to approximately 6,000 square kilometres (2,300 sq mi) in total.

== Ecology and behaviour ==
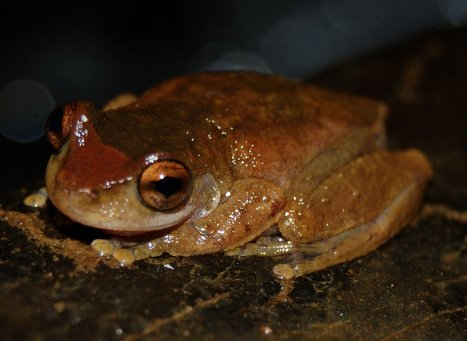
In a posture for water conservation

=== Reproduction ===
Breeding occurs throughout the year, with peak calling occurring during the warmer season of the Australian summer between November and March as the males are typically quieter in colder temperatures. Male common mist frogs have been observed to call from rocks and vegetation around streams and creeks .

To increase the probability of a successful mating, males display inter-male spacing. This is demonstrated by the males spreading out, with males rarely observed closer than one metre (3 ft 3 in) from another. The common mist frog's inter-male spacing is likely a territorial response to a low population of female mist frogs. Such spreading is thought to prevent interference with another frog's mating. Like other torrent treefrogs, the male common mist frog possesses spinose nuptial pads, which are help male frogs grasp females during mating.

After mating, female common mist frogs deposit their eggs in gelatinous masses underneath rocks in fast-flowing water. About 46-63 eggs are laid beneath rocks, to prevent them from being washed away with the stream and are large and uncolored. The tadpoles are stream-dwellers, and have suctorial mouthparts to allow them to survive in fast-flowing water. The tadpoles hatch among the rocks in a riffle and feed on algae.

=== Diet ===
The diet of common mist frogs consists of a range of terrestrial and aquatic prey including insects and spiders. They are indiscriminate in their selection of prey, consuming what is most available in their habitats. Common mist frogs display a seasonal shift in prey selectivity, feeding even more indiscriminately during the dry season. This pattern is likely due to the fact that there is simply less food available during drier seasons. Common mist frogs display sex-specific variations in foraging behaviour. This results in male and female common mist frogs having very different diets and eating patterns. Male mist frogs tend to have more restricted foraging activity than females and also display greater fidelity to a specific breeding site.

=== Behaviour ===
Males have been observed foot-flagging, which is thought to be a way to communicate to other male frogs that they have encroached on the flagger's territory. Foot-flagging is when a male frog fully extends his back leg and foot into the air, then drags it back down against the ground. This behavior is not unique to the common mist frog, as it has also been observed in several other species.

== Threats ==
A key factor that is largely responsible for the common mist frog's endangered status is chytridiomycosis, a disease that is caused by the chytrid fungus Batrachochytrium dendrobatidis. This parasitic fungus attacks the skin cells of amphibians and disrupts their osmoregulatory and transport functions, altering electrolyte concentrations in the blood. The disease can ultimately cause cardiac arrest once the fungal population on the host organism reaches a high enough density. B. dendrobatidis is strongly influenced by temperature, with the optimal temperature for growth being between 15 and 20 degrees Celsius. Due to the pathogen's vulnerability to temperature, the prevalence of this disease among amphibians is strongly connected to the seasons. Common mist frogs are more vulnerable to infection by B. dendrobatidis during the colder months, especially in areas of higher elevation. By the mid-1990s, chytridiomycosis had eliminated the majority of common mist frogs at elevations greater than 400 meters above sea level. Habitat modification has also greatly impacted the species, with about 20% of tropical rainforests in northeastern Queensland being cleared in 1983. The common mist frog has disappeared from most upland sites south of the Daintree River.

Another possible cause of the common mist frog's observed population decline is the activity of feral pigs in areas that were previously inhabited by common mist frogs. Feral pigs are responsible for much of the damage to riparian habitats.

== Conservation ==
Populations of the common mist frog have declined since 1990 and it is classified as an endangered species by the International Union for Conservation of Nature (IUCN) since in 2001.

Efforts to prevent the continued decline in the species' population are being enacted to potentially increase their numbers. One key factor is that much of the areas inhabited by the common mist frog are protected within World Heritage-listed national parks and in others their environment is largely protected from buildings and modern development. Additionally, a set of protocols designed to minimize the spread of diseases that threaten the common mist frog's survival has also been established. The movement of common mist frog tadpoles has also been greatly restricted, ensuring that mist frog progeny are not separated from their parents, which improves their chances of survival and later reproductive success.

There are also plans to reintroduce the common mist frog to habitats in which the mist frog formerly inhabited. Such efforts will likely involve transplanting common mist frog populations to those previously populated areas in which the common mist frog will likely have the greatest fitness.
