= Mount Carbine Tableland =

Mountain in Queensland, Australia

Coordinates: 16°26′45″S 145°13′54″E

The Mount Carbine Tableland is a plateau in Far North Queensland, Australia. Part of the Great Dividing Range, it lies in the Shire of Mareeba 15 km west of Mossman, and 1,460 km north-west of Brisbane, reaching an altitude of 1,383 m above sea level. It is largely covered with tropical rainforest and receives an annual rainfall total of 2,000 mm.

The tablelands are part of the Wet Tropics of Queensland World Heritage area.

Mountains associated with the tableland include Mount Spurgeon (1,317 m), Roots Mount (1,313 m), Devils Thumb (1,258 m) and Black Mountain (1,311 m). The plateau's highest point is unnamed, and is the fourth tallest mountain in Queensland.

== Fauna ==
The armoured mist frog (Litoria lorica) was feared to be extinct until it was rediscovered at a creek on the Mount Carbine Tableland in July 2008. The Northern barred frog is a recently described species which is only found on the Mount Carbine and Mount Windsor tablelands.

The rich basaltic soils in the area supports forests which provide habitat for the Lumholtz's tree-kangaroo.

== See also ==
- List of mountains in Australia
