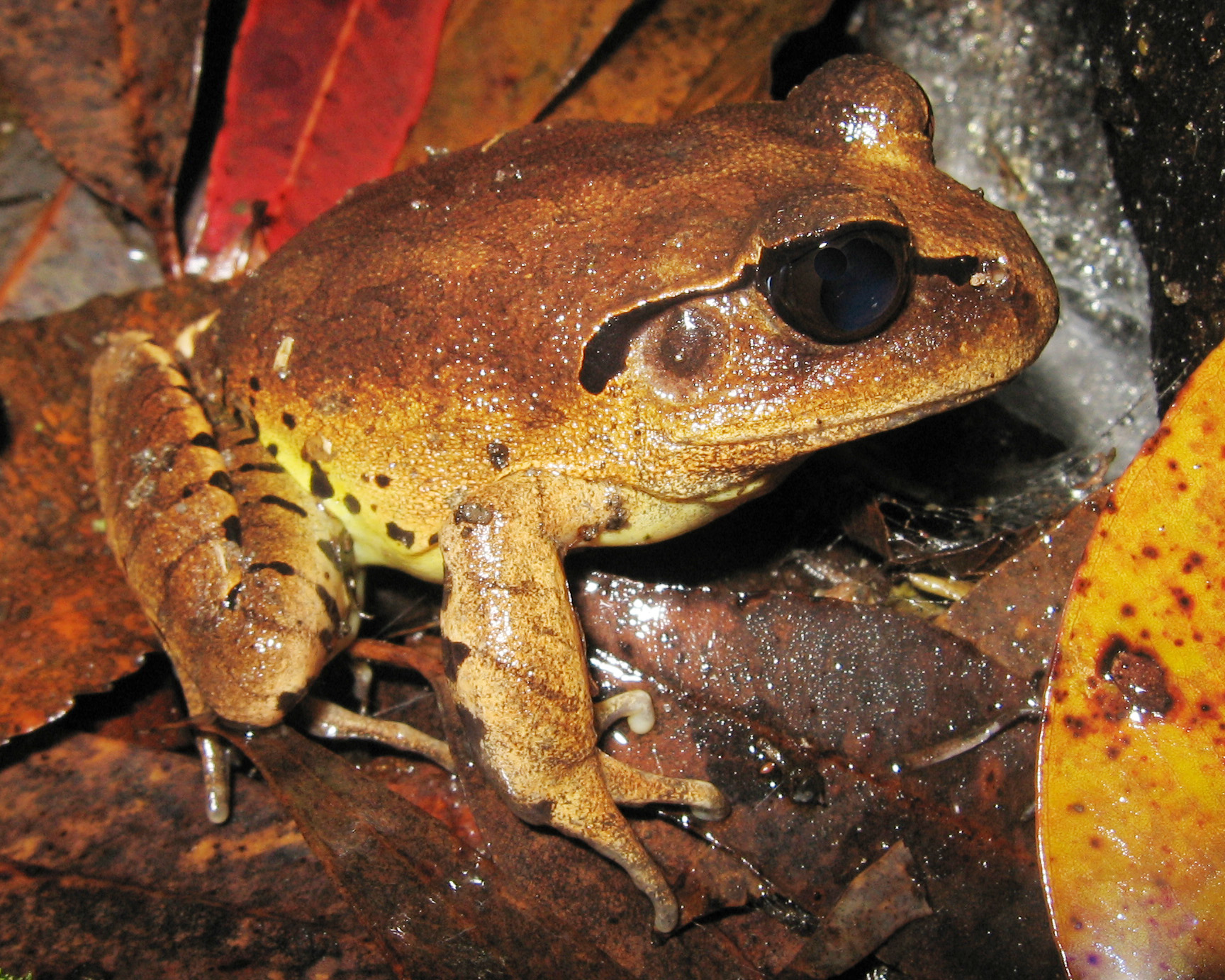

Conservation status
- Least Concern (IUCN 3.1)

Scientific classification
- Kingdom: Animalia
- Phylum: Chordata
- Class: Amphibia
- Order: Anura
- Family: Myobatrachidae
- Genus: Mixophyes
- Species: M. fasciolatus

Binomial name
- Mixophyes fasciolatus Gunther, 1864
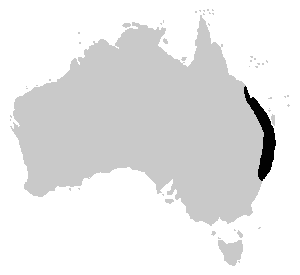
- Range of the great barred frog

= Great barred frog =

Species of amphibian

The great barred frog (Mixophyes fasciolatus) is an Australian ground-dwelling frog of the genus Mixophyes.

== Description ==
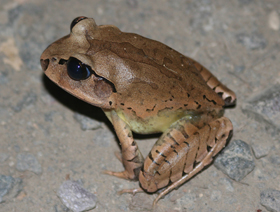

The great barred frog reaches a size of 8 centimetres and has large, powerful legs. It has a dark brown dorsal surface and a white ventral surface. The thighs are yellow blotched with black and it has parallel black bars along the legs. A dark line begins at the snout, passes through the eye and over the tympanum, and bends down behind the tympanum. Its feet are fully webbed and hands completely un-webbed. Its eyes are on top of the head and the tympanum is visible.

The tadpoles are quite large, reaching 8.5 centimetres long, and are grey-brown or gold-brown in colour.

== Ecology and behaviour ==
The great barred frog is a ground-dwelling frog which inhabits rainforests, Antarctic beech forests, or wet sclerophyll forests. This frog breeds in both streams and ponds, and it calls from the surrounding land. All the other frogs of the genus Mixophyes breed only in streams. The mating call is a very loud "wark-wark-wark" which is occasionally followed by a softer, slow trill "bwaaark-bwaaark".

The male and female great barred frog will enter the water for amplexus. After laying the eggs, the female will flick them onto the bank for development. The eggs will then be washed into the stream or pond after the first rain and hatch into tadpoles. The tadpoles take around 12 months to develop into frogs.

The great barred frog is almost always found near running water. Its powerful legs, and webbed feet allow it to escape predation by hopping large distances into water and quickly swimming away.

== As a pet ==
In Australia this animal can be kept in captivity with the appropriate permit.
