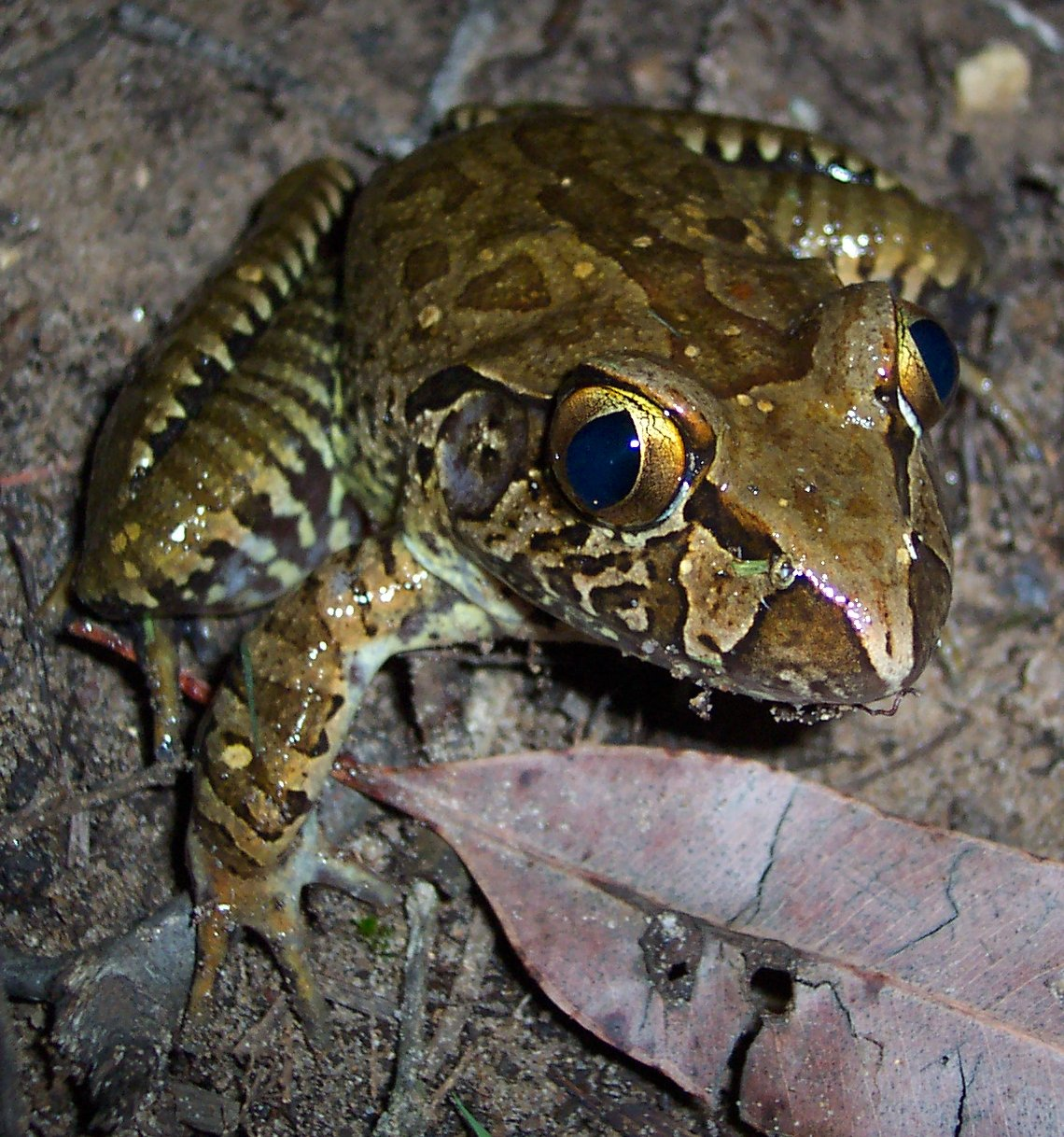

Conservation status
- Endangered (IUCN 3.1)

Scientific classification
- Kingdom: Animalia
- Phylum: Chordata
- Class: Amphibia
- Order: Anura
- Family: Myobatrachidae
- Genus: Mixophyes
- Species: M. iteratus

Binomial name
- Mixophyes iteratus Straughan, 1968
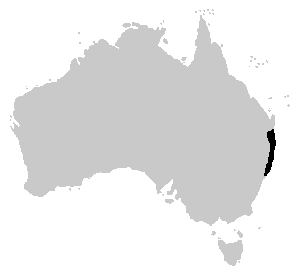
- Range of the giant barred frog

= Giant barred frog =

Species of amphibian

The giant barred frog (Mixophyes iteratus) is a species of barred frog found in Australia. It occurs from south-eastern Queensland to just south of the Newcastle region in New South Wales. It is associated with flowing streams and creeks in wet sclerophyll and rainforest habitats from the coast to the ranges.

== Description ==
This is Australia's second largest species of frog, reaching a maximum size of about 120 millimetres (4.7 in). This frog is normally dark brown on the dorsal surface with some spots of variable size in a darker colour. The upper half of the iris is golden in colour, with the bottom half being darker, a thin dark stripe runs from the snout, through the eye, and down past the tympanum. There is a dark triangle shape on the end of the snout starting from the nostril, with a paler triangle present behind it stretching to the eye. The legs are very strongly barred and the toes are fully webbed. The thighs and side are a distinct pale yellowish in colour with many darker spots also present in this area. The underbelly is white.

== Ecology and behaviour ==
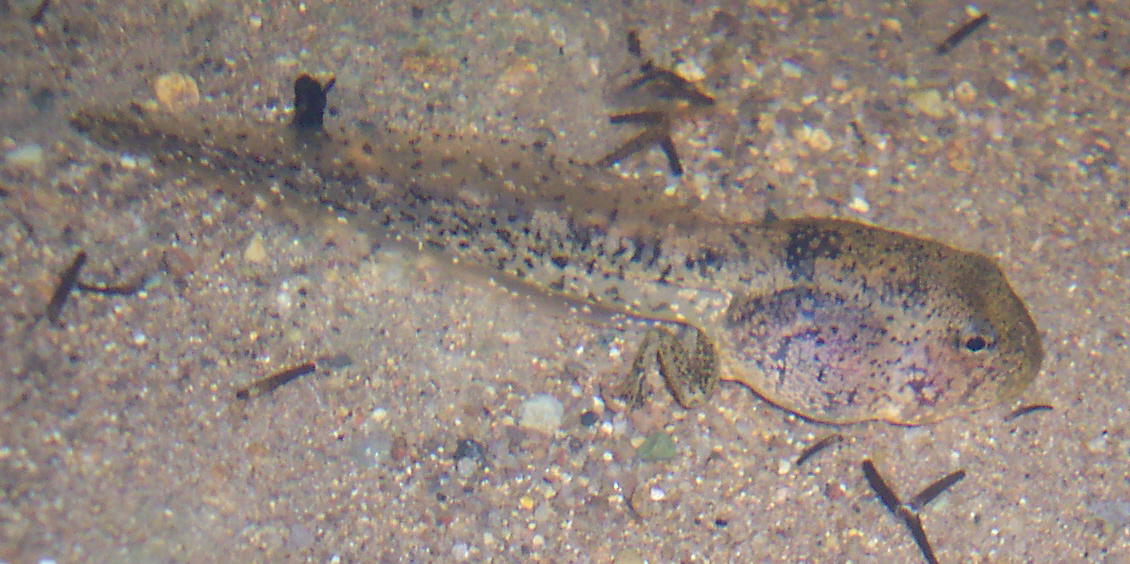
A Mixophyes iteratus tadpole.

This species is always found close to water, normally permanent flowing creeks, however they will sometimes also inhabit dams in wet sclerophyll and rainforest.

The call of this species is a deep grunting noise, males call in the spring and summer from the edges of streams after rain. During amplexus the female kicks the eggs up onto an overhanging bank or rocks. The eggs stick to this surface until heavy rain when they may be washed into the water, or without heavy rains to wash the eggs into the water the tadpoles simply fall into the water 8–10 days after laying. The tadpoles of this species grow very large, up to 84mm and are among the largest in Australia.
