= Rocket frog =

Rocket frog is a common name for many species of frog, it may refer to:

- Allobates ranoides, Llanos rocket frog
- Anomaloglossus beebei, Beebe's rocket frog, golden rocket frog
- Anomaloglossus surinamensis, Suriname rocket frog
- Aromobates alboguttatus, whitebelly rocket frog
- Colostethus flotator, rainforest rocket frog
- Colostethus jacobuspetersi, Quito rocket frog
- Colostethus nubicola, Boquete rocket frog
- Colostethus panamensis, common rocket frog
- Litoria dorsalis, dwarf rocket frog
- Litoria freycineti, wallum rocket frog
- Litoria inermis, bumpy rocket frog
- Litoria longirostris, scrub rocket frog
- Litoria nasuta, striped rocket frog
- Litoria watjulumensis, giant or large rocket frog

Rocket frog may also refer to

- FROG rockets, a term for FROG-7

== See also ==
- Orbiting Frog Otolith
- Animals in space
