= Peters' frog =

Peters' frog may refer to:

- Peters' dwarf frog, a frog found in Colombia, Ecuador, and Peru
- Peters' frog (Australia), a frog endemic to northern Australia
- Peters' frog (India), a frog endemic to the Western Ghats in southern India
- Peters' robber frog, a frog found in Colombia and Ecuador
