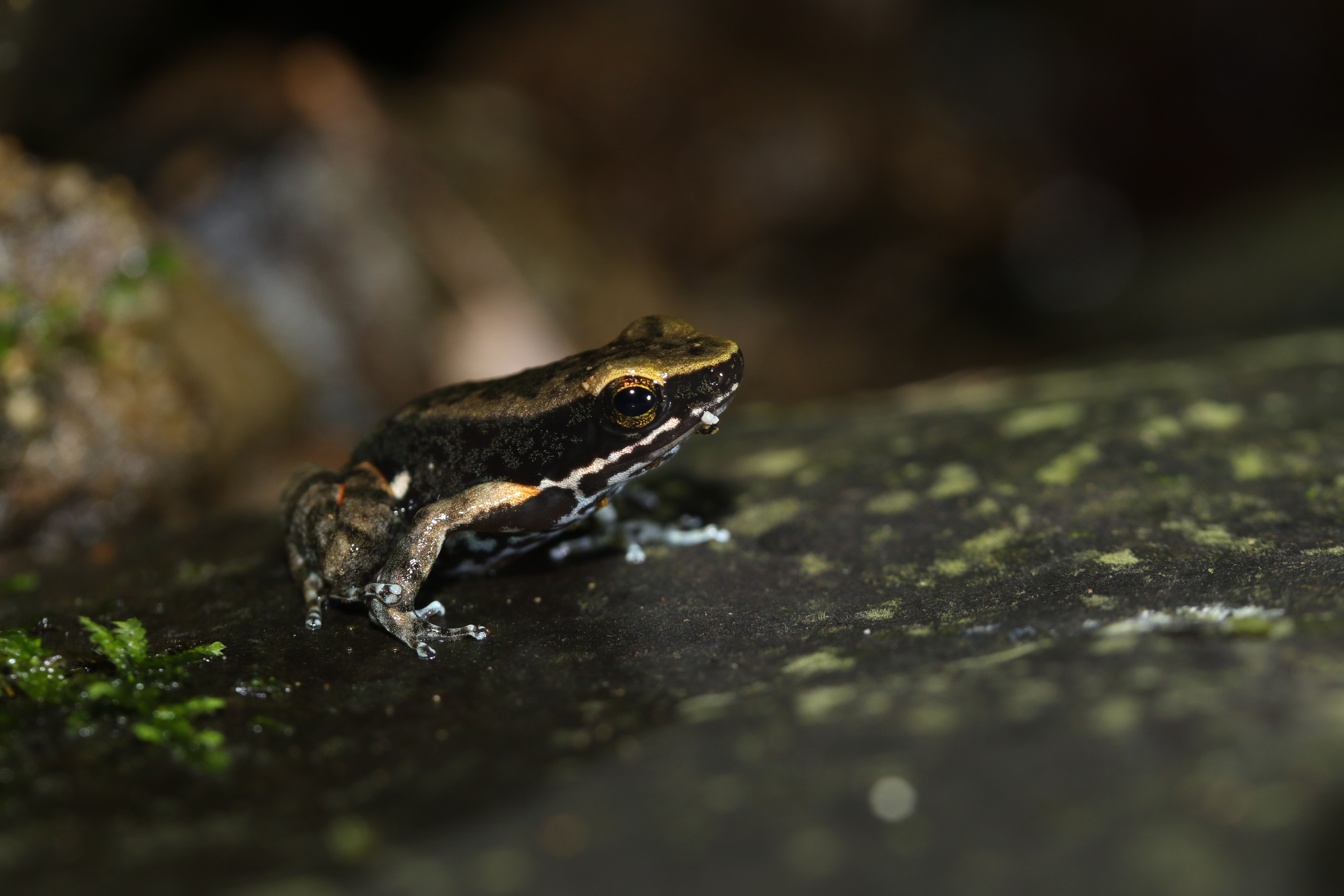

Conservation status
- Endangered (IUCN 3.1)

Scientific classification
- Kingdom: Animalia
- Phylum: Chordata
- Class: Amphibia
- Order: Anura
- Family: Dendrobatidae
- Genus: Colostethus
- Species: C. imbricolus

Binomial name
- Colostethus imbricolus Silverstone, 1975

= Colostethus imbricolus =

Species of frog

Colostethus imbricolus is a species of frog in the family Dendrobatidae. It is endemic to Colombia.

== Habitat ==
This terrestrial frog has been observed near streams in lowland forests and occasionally on banana plantations, always between 200 and 300 meters above sea level. The frog's range includes at least one protected park: One of the places this frog lives is a protected park: Parque Nacional Utría.

== Reproduction ==
After the eggs hatch, the female frog carries the tadpoles to streams, where they swim and grow. This is unusual for frogs within Colostethus. With the exceptions of C. pratti and C. panamansis, the male frog usually transports the tadpoles to water.

== Threats ==
This species is classified as endangered by the International Union for the Conservation of Nature. The principal threat is habitat loss, specifically deforestation associated with logging, human habitation, and both legal and illegal agriculture. Pollution from these farms also poses a threat. There are gold mines near the frog's known habitat and scientists believe that any frogs that may live there would be in danger. Scientists note that the fungal disease chytridiomycosis can kill this frog but they do not know if it is responsible for any changes in its population.

== Original description ==
- Silverstone PA. (1975). "Two new species of Colostethus (Amphibia: Anura: Dendrobatidae) from Colombia". Contributions in Science. Natural History Museum of Los Angeles County. 268: 1–10.
