= Helicops carinicaudus =

Conservation status
- Least Concern (IUCN 3.1)

Scientific classification
- Kingdom: Animalia
- Phylum: Chordata
- Class: Reptilia
- Order: Squamata
- Suborder: Serpentes
- Family: Colubridae
- Genus: Helicops
- Species: H. carinicaudus

Binomial name
- Helicops carinicaudus (Wied-Neuwied, 1825)

Species of snake

Helicops carinicaudus is a species of snake in the family Colubridae. It is endemic to eastern Brazil. Specimens from Colombia are likely mislabeled, probably representing Helicops danieli.

There are two subspecies:

- Helicops carinicaudus carinicauda Wied-Neuwied, 1825
- Helicops carinicaudus triserialis Lindholm, 1902

The former subspecies Helicops carinicaudus infrataeniatus is now considered a valid species, Helicops infrataeniatus.
