= James A. Peters =

American herpetologist and zoogeographer

Dr. James Arthur Peters
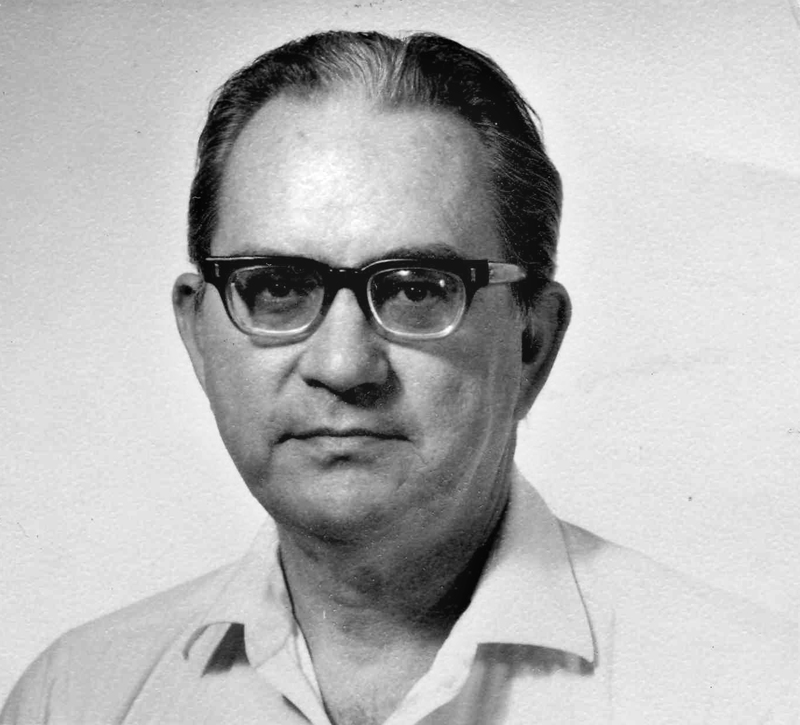
- Born: July 13, 1922; Durant, Iowa, United States
- Died: December 18, 1972 (aged 50)
- Education: University of Michigan
- Known for: His research on herpetofauna of Ecuador
- Scientific career
- Fields: Herpetology
- Workplaces: Smithsonian Institution

James Arthur Peters (July 13, 1922 – December 18, 1972) was an American herpetologist and zoogeographer.

He was born in Durant, Iowa, and raised in Greenup, Illinois. He studied at the University of Michigan, where he obtained his Ph.D. in biology in 1952. He studied with the herpetologist Norman Edouard Hartweg.

His main subject of research was herpetology and zoogeography of Latin America, especially Ecuador. During his thirty years of research in herpetology he described 17 new species or subspecies, most of them amphibians, such as several neotropical toads of the genus Atelopus.

Peters died of liver cancer in 1972 (Irish & Zug, 1982).

== Career and positions ==
He held teaching positions at

- Brown University (1952–1958)
- Universidad Central de Ecuador, Fulbright Lecturer (1958–1959)
- Southern Illinois University (1959)
- San Fernando Valley State College (1959–1966)

He held positions in the Department of Reptiles and Amphibians at the Smithsonian Institution

- Associate Curator (1964–1967)
- Curator (1967–1972)

Peters was a member of professional societies such as: American Society of Ichthyologists and Herpetologists, where he served as secretary, 1960–1966, vice-president, 1967 and president, 1970. He was elected to the Washington Biologists' Field Club. He inaugurated the Smithsonian Herpetological Information Services which distributed materials to herpetological institutions and individuals. He founded the newsletter MUDPIE (Museum and University Data Program and Information Exchange) providing information on computer programs, references, grants, meetings, etc.

== Honors ==
Several neotropical amphibians and reptiles are named after him, including Ameerega petersi, Anadia petersi, Andinosaura petrorum, Colostethus jacobuspetersi, Dipsas jamespetersi, Gonatodes petersi, Helicops petersi, Micrurus petersi, Pristimantis petersi, and Tantilla petersi. James Peters is not to be confused with Wilhelm Peters (1815-1883), a German herpetologist, after whom also several species were named. In fact, Andinosaura petrorum was named after both James Peters and Wilhelm Peters, with petrorum (Latin, genitive plural) meaning "of the Peters", honoring both contributions to neotropical herpetology.

== Selected works ==
- Peters JA (1960). Snakes of the Subfamily Dipsadinae. University of Michigan Museum of Zoology.
- Peters JA, Orejas-Miranda B, Donoso-Barros R (1970). Catalogue of Neotropical Squamata. Washington, District of Columbia: Smithsonian Institution. 2 vols. B9149.
- Peters JA (1959). Classic Papers in Genetics. Englewood Cliffs, New Jersey: Prentice-Hall Inc.
- Peters JA (1964). Dictionary of Herpetology. New York: Hafner.
- Article in the Concise American Heritage Dictionary.
- Article in the Encyclopædia Britannica.
- The snakes of Ecuador; check list and key (The Museum, Cambridge, 1960).
