= Chattering rock frog =

Scientific classification
- Kingdom: Animalia
- Phylum: Chordata
- Class: Amphibia
- Order: Anura
- Family: Pelodryadidae
- Genus: Litoria
- Species: L. staccato

Binomial name
- Litoria staccato Doughty & Anstis, 2007

Species of Australian frog

The chattering rock frog (Litoria staccato) is a species of frog that is endemic to Western Australia. The species epithet staccato and the common name refer to the sound of its call.

== Description ==
The species is a small to medium-sized frog which grows to about 35 mm SVL. The colouration varies between dark red, beige and slate-grey. It has a pointed snout and partly-webbed toes. Its closest relative is the rock frog (Litoria coplandi) which has, however, a very different call.

== Distribution and habitat ==
The species is restricted to the tropical north-west Kimberley region of north-western Australia. It is found in rocky creeks, along ridges and on rock platforms.
