= Kimberley rockhole frog =

Scientific classification
- Kingdom: Animalia
- Phylum: Chordata
- Class: Amphibia
- Order: Anura
- Family: Pelodryadidae
- Genus: Mahonabatrachus
- Species: M. aurifer

Binomial name
- Mahonabatrachus aurifer Anstis, Tyler, Roberts, Price & Doughty, 2010

Synonyms
- Litoria aurifera Anstis, Tyler, Roberts, Price, and Doughty, 2010

Species of Australian frog

The Kimberley rockhole frog (Mahonabatrachus aurifer) is a species of small treefrog that is endemic to Western Australia. The species epithet aurifera (‘gold-bearing’) refers to the colouring of the tadpoles.

== History ==
The species was described in 2010 following the discovery by botanists Matt and Russell Barrett of its distinctive tadpoles in shallow water near the Prince Regent River in the tropical Kimberley region of north-west Australia.

== Description ==
The species is similar in appearance to the common rockhole frog (Mahonabatrachus meiriana). It grows up to 22 mm long, and has small limbs with fully webbed toes. The tadpoles have black bodies with gold patches on the snout and back. The metamorphs are about 11 mm long.

== Distribution and habitat ==
The frog has a restricted range in rugged sandstone country, from Walcott Inlet to the Prince Regent National Park, where it occurs in rocky waterholes and creeks.
