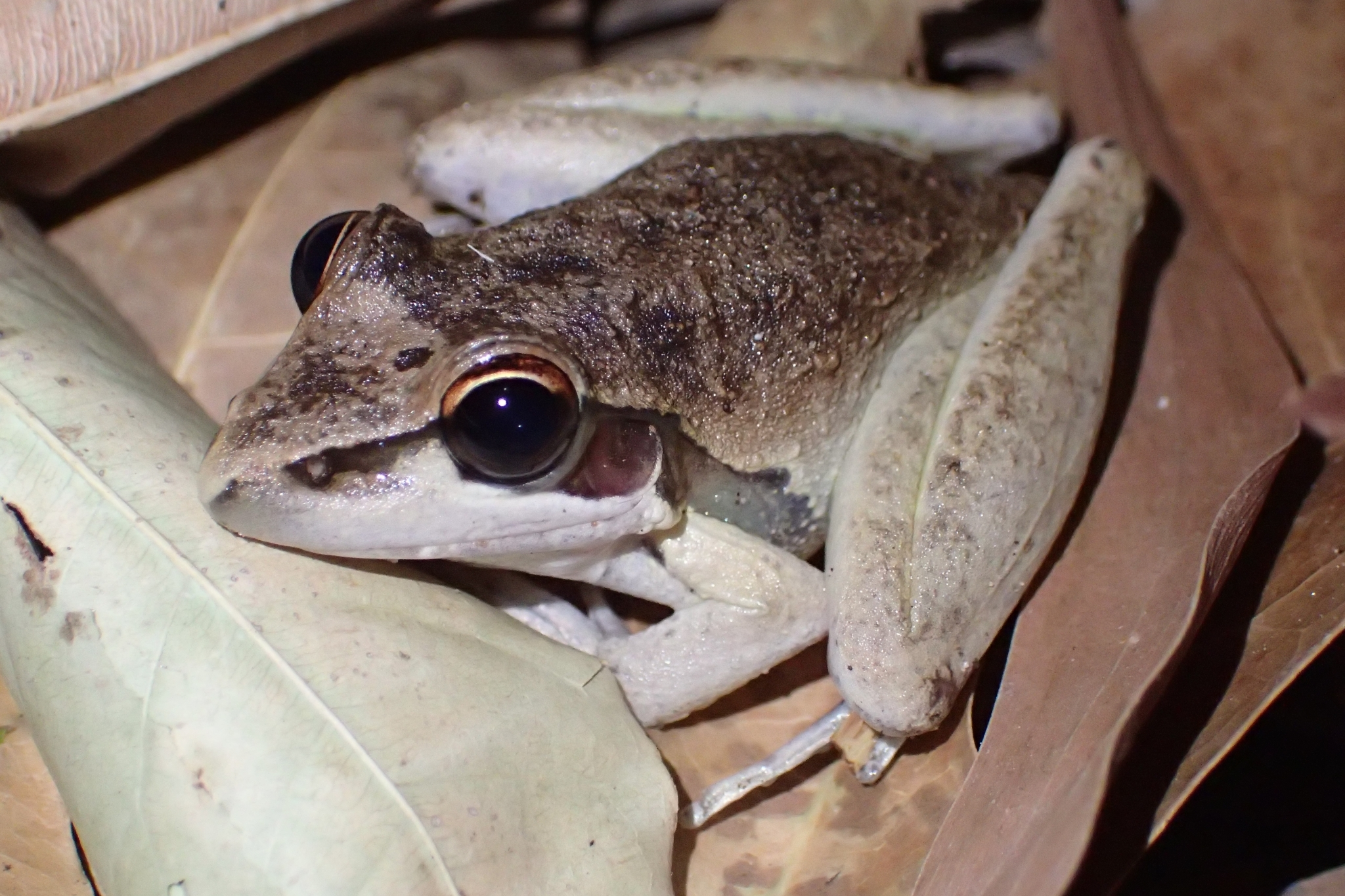

Conservation status
- Least Concern (IUCN 3.1)

Scientific classification
- Kingdom: Animalia
- Phylum: Chordata
- Class: Amphibia
- Order: Anura
- Family: Pelodryadidae
- Genus: Litoria
- Species: L. spaldingi

Binomial name
- Litoria spaldingi (Hosmer, 1964)

Synonyms
- Hyla spaldingi Hosmer, 1964; Litoria spaldingi – Wells and Wellington, 1985

= Northern creek frog =

Species of frog

The northern creek frog (Litoria spaldingi) is a tree frog endemic to Australia. It has been found in the Northern Territory and in the western Queensland.

The species was originally considered a synonym of the Watjulum frog (Litoria watjulumensis) but was resurrected as a species in 2021.

== Original publication ==
- Hosmer, W. (1964). "A new frog of the genus Hyla, from Northern Territory, Australia". American Museum Novitates (2182): 1–7.
