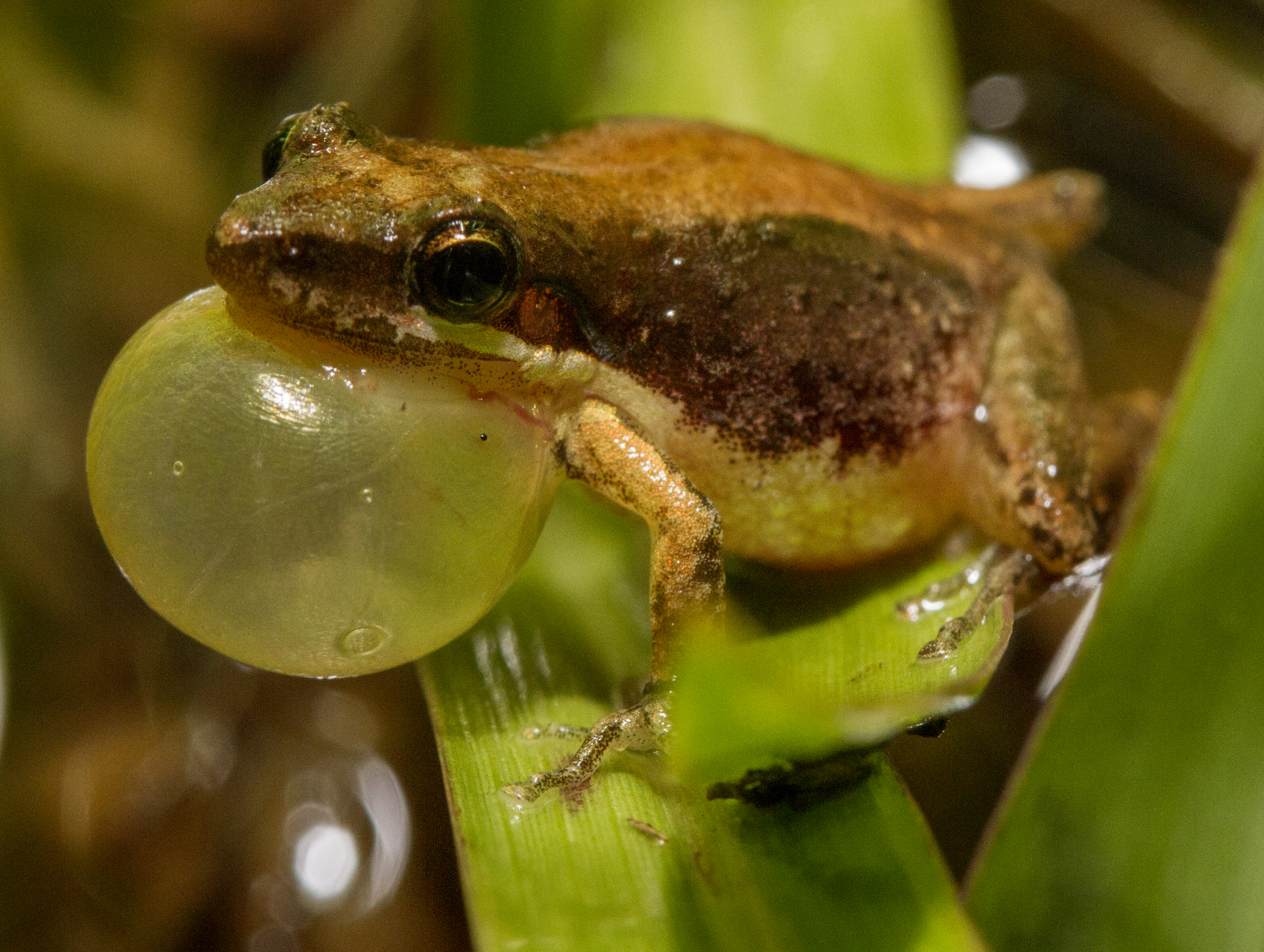
- Calling male Javelin frog (Mahonabatrachus microbelos)

Scientific classification
- Kingdom: Animalia
- Phylum: Chordata
- Class: Amphibia
- Order: Anura
- Family: Pelodryadidae
- Genus: Mahonabatrachus; Wells & Wellington, 1985

Species
- See text

= Mahonabatrachus =

Genus of amphibians

Mahonabatrachus is a genus of tree frogs in the family Pelodryadidae. These frogs are native to northern Australia and southern New Guinea. Species in the genus were previously included within the wastebasket genus Litoria, but were separated into a new genus in 2025. They are very small-to-small sized frogs that exhibit many shades of greys, browns or reds.

The genus is named for Professor Michael Mahony in recognition for his work on Australian frogs.

== Species ==
Mahonabatrachus contains six species:

| Common name | Binomial name |
|---|---|
| Kimberley rockhole frog | Mahonabatrachus aurifer (Anstis, Tyler, Roberts, Price, and Doughty, 2010) |
| Dwarf rocket frog | Mahonabatrachus dorsalis (Macleay, 1878) |
| Long-snouted frog | Mahonabatrachus longirostris (Tyler and Davies, 1977) |
| Rockhole frog | Mahonabatrachus meirianus (Tyler, 1969) |
| Javelin frog | Mahonabatrachus microbelos (Cogger, 1969) |
| Menemsorae tree frog | Mahonabatrachus timidus (Tyler and Parker, 1972) |
