= Helicops petersi =

Conservation status
- Near Threatened (IUCN 3.1)

Scientific classification
- Kingdom: Animalia
- Phylum: Chordata
- Class: Reptilia
- Order: Squamata
- Suborder: Serpentes
- Family: Colubridae
- Genus: Helicops
- Species: H. petersi

Binomial name
- Helicops petersi Rossman, 1976

Species of snake

Helicops petersi, also known commonly as the spiral keelback and la culebra de aqua de Peters in South American Spanish, is a species of snake in the subfamily Dipsadinae of the family Colubridae. The species is native to northwestern South America.

== Etymology ==
The specific name, petersi, is in honor of American herpetologist James A. Peters.

== Description ==
Dorsally, Helicops petersi is grayish coffee-colored, with darker spots. Ventrally, it is cream-colored.

A small species of snake, adults may attain a total length (tail included) of 58 cm (23 in).

The keeled dorsal scales are arranged in 21–23 rows at midbody, and in 16 rows approaching the cloaca. The ventral scales number 135–150.

== Geographic distribution ==
Helicops petersi is found in southwestern Colombia and western Ecuador.

== Habitat ==
The preferred natural habitat of Helicops petersi is freshwater wetlands in forest, at elevations of 300–1,790 m (980–5,870 ft).

== Behavior ==
Helicops petersi is nocturnal and semi-aquatic.

== Diet ==
Helicops petersi preys predominately upon fishes.

== Reproduction ==
Helicops petersi is ovoviviparous.
