= Helicops pastazae =

Conservation status
- Least Concern (IUCN 3.1)

Scientific classification
- Kingdom: Animalia
- Phylum: Chordata
- Class: Reptilia
- Order: Squamata
- Suborder: Serpentes
- Family: Colubridae
- Genus: Helicops
- Species: H. pastazae

Binomial name
- Helicops pastazae Shreve, 1934

Species of snake

Helicops pastazae, also known commonly as Shreve's keelback and la culebra de agua de Pastaza in South American Spanish, is a species of snake in the subfamily Dipsadinae of the family Colubridae. The species is native to northwestern South America.

== Etymology ==
The specific name, pastazae, refers to the Pastaza River.

== Description ==
Helicops pastazae may attain a total length (tail included) of 67 cm (26 in).

== Geographic distribution ==
Helicops pastazae is found in Bolivia, Colombia, Ecuador, Peru, and Venezuela.

== Habitat ==
The preferred natural habitat of Helicops pastazae is freshwater wetlands in forest, at elevations of 200–900 m (660–2,950 ft).

== Behavior ==
Helicops pastazae is semiaquatic.

== Diet ==
Helicops pastazae preys upon freshwater fishes.

== Reproduction ==
Helicops pastazae is ovoviviparous.
