= Micrurus petersi =

Conservation status
- Data Deficient (IUCN 3.1)

Scientific classification
- Kingdom: Animalia
- Phylum: Chordata
- Class: Reptilia
- Order: Squamata
- Suborder: Serpentes
- Family: Elapidae
- Genus: Micrurus
- Species: M. petersi

Binomial name
- Micrurus petersi Roze, 1967
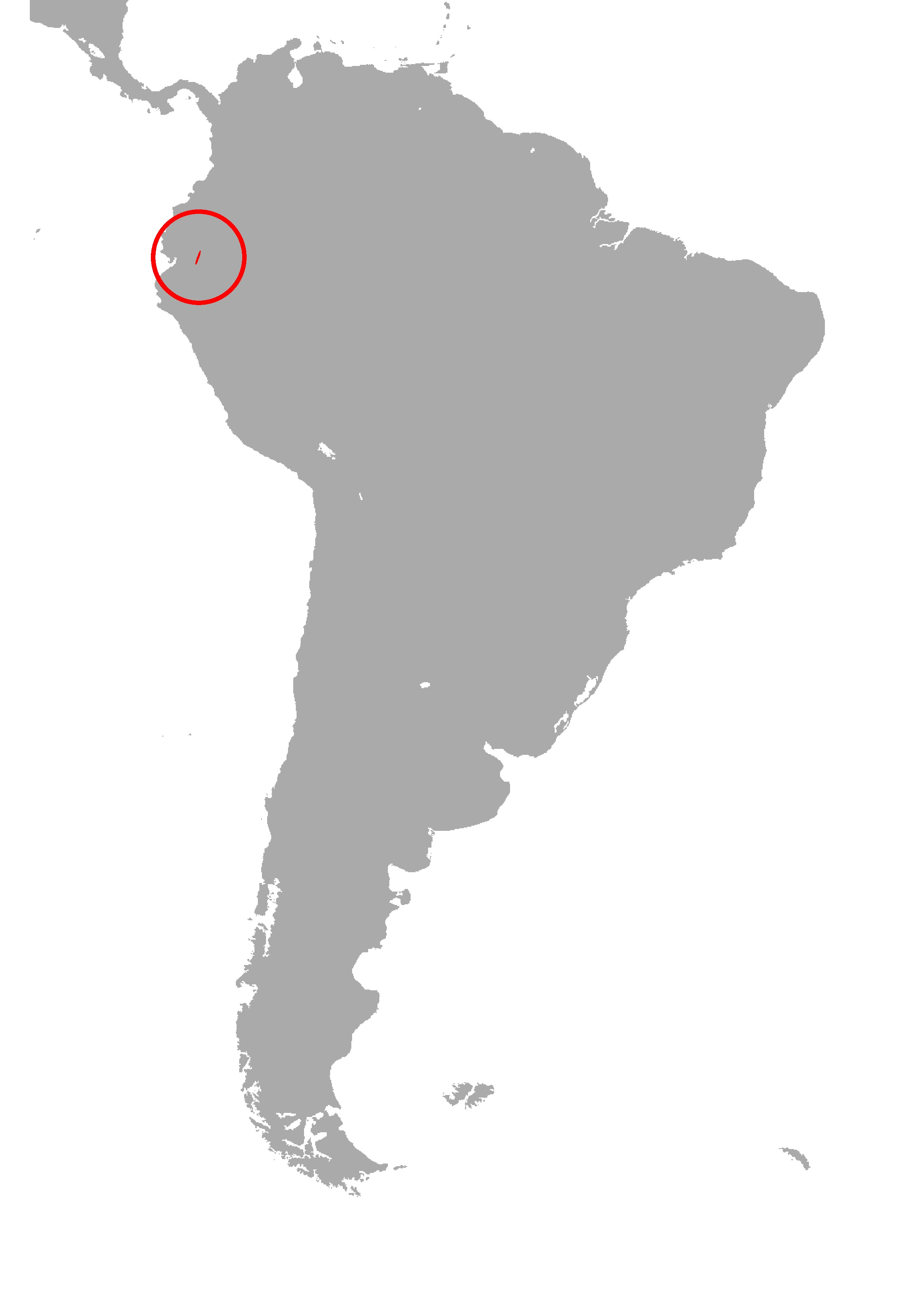

Synonyms
- Micrurus steindachneri petersi Roze, 1967

Species of snake

Micrurus petersi, also known commonly as the mountain coral snake and Peters' coral snake or Peters's coral snake, is a species of venomous snake in the family Elapidae. The species is endemic to Ecuador.

== Etymology ==
The specific name, petersi, is in honor of American herpetologist James A. Peters, who specialized in the amphibians and reptiles of Ecuador.

== Description ==
Micrurus petersi is medium-sized for its genus. It may attain a total length (tail included) of 67 cm (26 in).

Like many New World coral snakes, the color pattern consists of red, white (or yellow), and black rings, with the black rings not arranged in triads. Unlike most New World coral snakes, there is light blue present on the snout.

Females have 231–232 ventrals and 31 subcaudals.

== Geographic distribution ==
Micrurus petersi is found in Morona-Santiago Province, Ecuador.

== Habitat ==
The natural habitat of Micrurus petersi is cloud forest on the eastern slope of the Andes at elevations of 950–1,400 m (3,120–4,590 ft).

== Behavior ==
Micrurus petersi is terrestrial.

== Reproduction ==
Micrurus petersi is oviparous.
