= Helicops tapajonicus =

Conservation status
- Least Concern (IUCN 3.1)

Scientific classification
- Kingdom: Animalia
- Phylum: Chordata
- Class: Reptilia
- Order: Squamata
- Suborder: Serpentes
- Family: Colubridae
- Genus: Helicops
- Species: H. tapajonicus

Binomial name
- Helicops tapajonicus da Frota, 2005

Species of snake

Helicops tapajonicus is a species of snake in the family Colubridae. It is found in Brazil.
