= Helicops trivittatus =

Conservation status
- Least Concern (IUCN 3.1)

Scientific classification
- Kingdom: Animalia
- Phylum: Chordata
- Class: Reptilia
- Order: Squamata
- Suborder: Serpentes
- Family: Colubridae
- Genus: Helicops
- Species: H. trivittatus

Binomial name
- Helicops trivittatus (JE Gray, 1849)

Species of snake

Helicops trivittatus, the equatorial keelback, is a species of snake in the family Colubridae. It is found in Brazil.
