= Colostethus thorntoni =

Conservation status
- Vulnerable (IUCN 3.1)

Scientific classification
- Kingdom: Animalia
- Phylum: Chordata
- Class: Amphibia
- Order: Anura
- Family: Dendrobatidae
- Genus: Colostethus
- Species: C. thorntoni

Binomial name
- Colostethus thorntoni (Cochran & Goin, 1970)

Synonyms
- Phyllobates thorntoni Cochran and Goin, 1970

Species of frog

Colostethus thorntoni is a species of frog in the family Dendrobatidae. It is endemic to Colombia where it is known from the Cordillera Central in the Antioquia Department.

== Habitat and ecology ==
Its natural habitat is sub-Andean forest. Little is known about its ecology. Scientists infer that this frog lives near streams and that the tadpoles develop in streams like their congeners. Scientists have observed this frog between 1480 and 2500 meters above sea level.

The type locality now has the city of Medellín on it, so it is unlikely that these frogs live there now.

== Threats ==
The IUCN classifies this frog as vulnerable to extinction, but less is known about it than other frogs in Colostethus. Its principal threats are inferred to be habitats associated with agriculture and human habitation.
