= Helicops acangussu =

Scientific classification
- Kingdom: Animalia
- Phylum: Chordata
- Class: Reptilia
- Order: Squamata
- Suborder: Serpentes
- Family: Colubridae
- Genus: Helicops
- Species: H. acangussu

Binomial name
- Helicops acangussu Moraes-da-Silva, Walterman, Citeli, Sales-Nunes, & Curcio, 2022

Species of snake

Helicops acangussu is a species of snake in the family Colubridae. It is endemic to Brazil, in the state of Rondônia.
