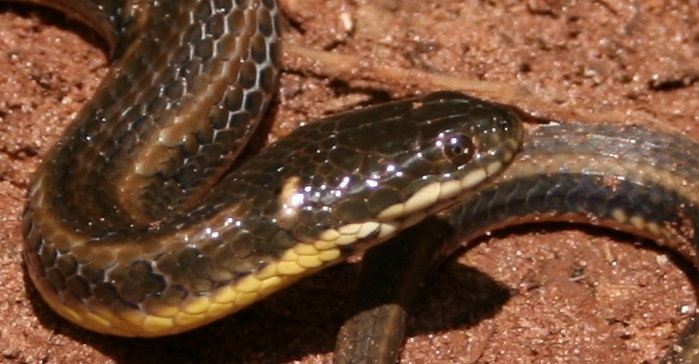
- Helicops infrataeniatus

Scientific classification
- Kingdom: Animalia
- Phylum: Chordata
- Class: Reptilia
- Order: Squamata
- Suborder: Serpentes
- Family: Colubridae
- Subfamily: Dipsadinae
- Genus: Helicops; Wagler, 1828

= Helicops (snake) =

Genus of snakes

Helicops is a genus of snakes in the subfamily Dipsadinae of the family Colubridae. The genus is endemic to South America.

== Species ==
The following 20 species are recognized as being valid.

- Helicops acangussu Moraes-da-Silva, Walterman, Citeli, Sales-Nunes & Curcio, 2022
- Helicops angulatus (Linnaeus, 1758) – brown-banded water snake
- Helicops apiaka Kawashita-Ribeiro, Ávila & Morais, 2013
- Helicops boitata Moares-da-Silva, Amaro, Sales-Nunes, Strüssmann, Teixeira, Andrade, Sudré, Recoder, Rodrigues & Curcio, 2019
- Helicops carinicaudus (Wied-Neuwied, 1825) – Wied's keelback
- Helicops danieli Amaral, 1938 – Daniel's keelback
- Helicops gomesi Amaral, 1921 – São Paulo keelback
- Helicops hagmanni Roux, 1910 – Hagmann's keelback
- Helicops infrataeniatus Jan, 1865
- Helicops leopardinus (Schlegel, 1837) – leopard keelback
- Helicops modestus Günther, 1861 – olive keelback
- Helicops nentur Costa, Santana, Leal, Koroiva & Garcia, 2016
- Helicops pastazae Shreve, 1934 – Shreve's keelback
- Helicops petersi Rossman, 1976 – spiral keelback
- Helicops phantasma Moraes Da Silva, Amaro, Sales-Nunes, Rodrigues & Curcio, 2021
- Helicops polylepis Günther, 1861 – Norman's keelback
- Helicops scalaris Jan, 1865 – ladder keelback
- Helicops tapajonicus da Frota, 2005
- Helicops trivittatus (Gray, 1849) – equatorial keelback
- Helicops yacu Rossman & Dixon, 1975 – Peru keelback

Nota bene: A binomial authority in parentheses indicates that the species was originally described in a genus other than Helicops.
