= Helicops phantasma =

Scientific classification
- Kingdom: Animalia
- Phylum: Chordata
- Class: Reptilia
- Order: Squamata
- Suborder: Serpentes
- Family: Colubridae
- Genus: Helicops
- Species: H. phantasma

Binomial name
- Helicops phantasma Moraes Da Silva, Amaro, Sales-Nunes, Rodrigues, & Curcio, 2021

Species of snake

Helicops phantasma is a species of snake in the family Colubridae. It is endemic to Brazil.
