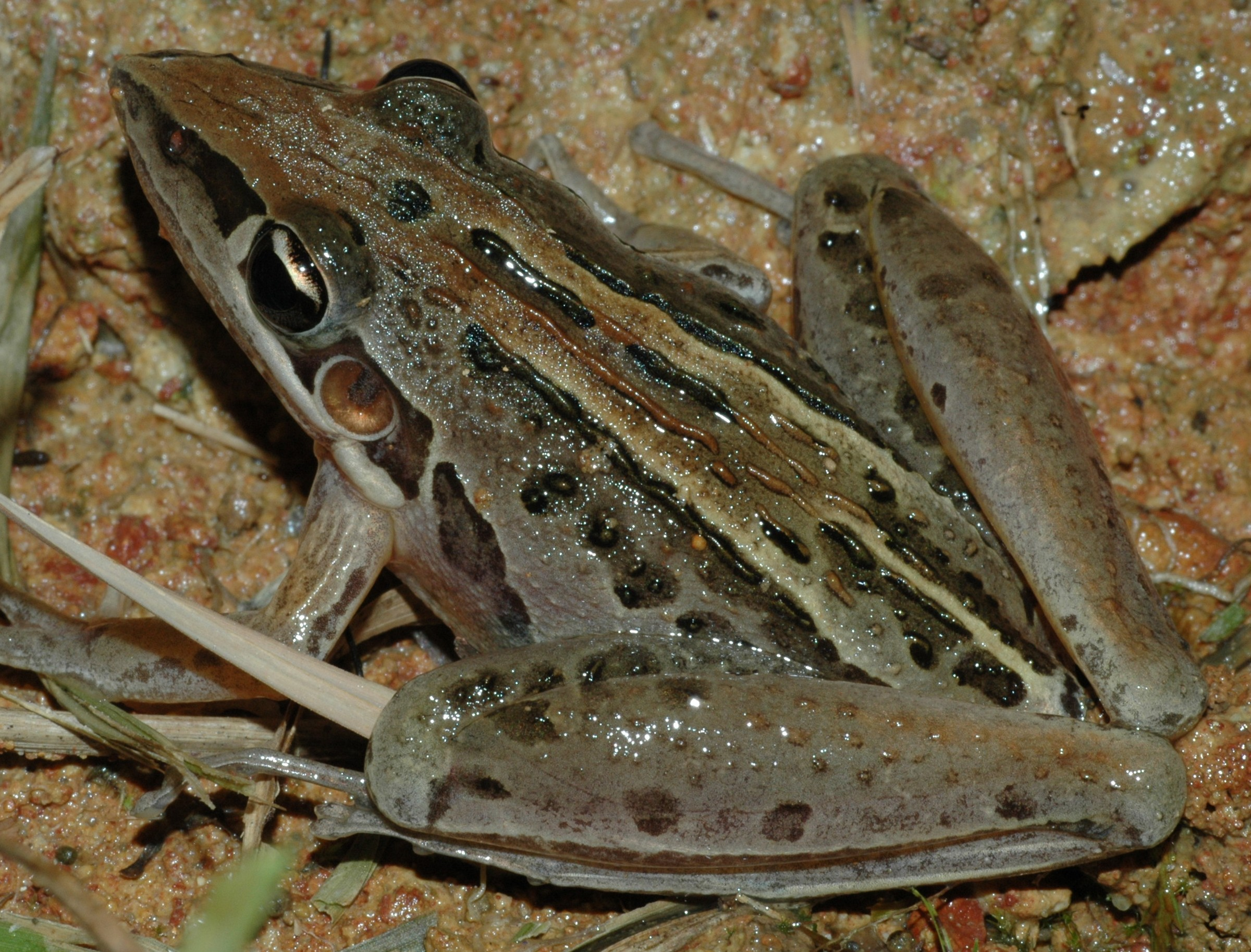

Conservation status
- Least Concern (IUCN 3.1)

Scientific classification
- Kingdom: Animalia
- Phylum: Chordata
- Class: Amphibia
- Order: Anura
- Family: Pelodryadidae
- Genus: Litoria
- Species: L. nasuta

Binomial name
- Litoria nasuta (Gray, 1842)

= Striped rocket frog =

Species of amphibian

The striped rocket frog (Litoria nasuta), or in its native range known as the rocket frog, is a species of frog that occurs mostly in coastal areas from northern Western Australia to around Gosford in New South Wales at its southernmost point, with a disjunct population occurring further south at the Sydney suburb of Avalon. It also inhabits the southern lowlands and south east peninsula of Papua New Guinea.

== Description ==
This species of frog is very variable in colour and patterning. It reaches 55 mm in length, has extremely long legs, and is very streamlined. Its dorsal surface is a shade of brown with longitudinal skin folds or warts that are darker in colour than the skin around them. The ventral surface is white and granular. A brown stripe starts from the nostril, goes across the eye, through the tympanum and ends between the armpit and groin. The tympanum is brown with a white circle surrounding it. The thighs are marked with black lines on a yellow background. Throats of breeding males are yellow. Although being a 'tree frog', this species spends most of its life as an adult on land, due to its inability to climb because of its small discs.

== Ecology ==
The striped rocket frog, also known as the rocket frog in its native range, is found mainly in coastal areas from northern Western Australia to Gosford in New South Wales, with an isolated population occurring further south in the Sydney suburb of Avalon. It is also found in the southern lowlands and south east peninsula of Papua New Guinea. This frog inhabits swamps, ponds, and flooded grasslands in forests and open woodland. It is a ground-dwelling frog in tropical forests. Known to be dispersed widely in the wet season.

== Behavior and reproduction ==
The striped rocket frog breeds in standing water during the wet season (December–March). Female striped rocket frogs are known to lay between 50 and 100 eggs per clutch. The tadpoles of this species are mottled brown in color and grow to about 6 cm in length. They may complete metamorphosis (the process of changing from a larval stage to an adult) in about a month. During the breeding season, the striped rocket frog makes a distinctive "wick wick" call to attract mates. This sound is produced by the expansion of the large vocal sac located near the throat, which pushes outward like a balloon.

The call is a 'wick... wick' repeated several times followed by a 'but... but'; the call may last for several seconds. Males call from spring through early autumn while sitting around the bank of a water body or in shallow water. Breeding increases after rain. This frog can leap 2 m (6.5 ft), roughly 36 times its own length. This would be the equivalent of a 1.8 m (6 ft) human making a jump 64.8 m (213 ft) long.

== Similar species ==
This species is a member of the rocket frog complex, which includes many species, for example Freycinet's frog (Litoria freycineti) and broad-palmed frog (L. latopalmata). All species in this complex are very agile jumpers and often contain "rocket frog" in the common name and have a duck-like quacking or wicking call. L. nasuta is sympatric with every species in this complex through at least part of its range. The dorsolateral stripes and skin folds on this species are best used to distinguish this species from others in the complex. The Australian wood frog, (Rana daemeli) is physically similar to this species and others in the complex. R. daemeli and L. nasuta both occur in the northern part of the Cape York Peninsula in Queensland.

== As a pet ==
It is kept as a pet, and in Australia this animal may be kept in captivity with the appropriate permit.
