= Helicops gomesi =

Conservation status
- Least Concern (IUCN 3.1)

Scientific classification
- Kingdom: Animalia
- Phylum: Chordata
- Class: Reptilia
- Order: Squamata
- Suborder: Serpentes
- Family: Colubridae
- Genus: Helicops
- Species: H. gomesi

Binomial name
- Helicops gomesi Amaral, 1922

Species of snake

Helicops gomesi, also known commonly as the São Paulo keelback and cobra d'água in Brazilian Portuguese, is a species of snake in the subfamily Dipsadinae of the family Colubridae. The species is endemic to Brazil.

== Etymology ==
The specific name, gomesi, is in honor of Brazilian herpetologist João Florêncio Gomes.

== Geographic distribution ==
Helicops gomesi is found in the Brazilian states of Goiás, Mato Grosso do Sul, Minas Gerais, Paraná, and São Paulo.

== Habitat ==
The preferred natural habitats of Helicops gomesi are forest and savanna.

== Description ==
Helicops gomesi may attain a snout-to-vent length (SVL) of 76 cm (30 in). Both dorsally and ventrally, it is brown, with some darker markings. Its dorsal scales are arranged in 19 rows throughout the length of its body.

== Diet ==
Helicops gomesi preys upon fishes and amphibians.

== Reproduction ==
Helicops gomes is oviparous. Clutch size is 7–22 eggs.
