= Colostethus latinasus =

Conservation status
- Critically Endangered (IUCN 3.1)

Scientific classification
- Kingdom: Animalia
- Phylum: Chordata
- Class: Amphibia
- Order: Anura
- Family: Dendrobatidae
- Genus: Colostethus
- Species: C. latinasus

Binomial name
- Colostethus latinasus (Cope, 1863)

Synonyms
- Phyllobates latinasus Cope, 1863

Species of frog

Colostethus latinasus is a species of frog in the family Dendrobatidae. It is known from Cerro Pirre in Darién Province, Panama, from Chocó Department in adjacent Colombia, and from Tierralta, Córdoba Department, Colombia.

== Description ==
Males measure up to 24.5 mm (0.96 in) and females to 34 mm (1.3 in) in snout–vent length. The dorsal surfaces are brown; there is a pair of lighter dorsolateral stripes that run from the head to the groin. The throat is white mottled with brown. The belly is mostly pale white but the mottling from the throat may extend onto in. The sides have a broad black stripe. The feet are almost totally without webbing.

== Reproduction ==
The female frog lays eggs on the leaf litter. After the eggs hatch, the adult frog carries the tadpoles to streams for further development.

The tadpoles are brown and have some darker brown markings on the tail.

== Habitat and conservation ==
In Panama, the species occurs in humid montane forests at elevations of 1,100–1,440 m (3,610–4,720 ft) above sea level. In Colombia it occurs in humid montane forests at elevations of about 900 m (3,000 ft) asl. It is a diurnal species often found along rocky sections of forest streams, but also further away from streams than other Colostethus species.

It occurs in the Darién National Park.
