= Colostethus furviventris =

Conservation status
- Data Deficient (IUCN 3.1)

Scientific classification
- Kingdom: Animalia
- Phylum: Chordata
- Class: Amphibia
- Order: Anura
- Family: Dendrobatidae
- Genus: Colostethus
- Species: C. furviventris

Binomial name
- Colostethus furviventris Rivero & Serna, 1991

Species of frog

Colostethus furviventris is a species of frog in the family Dendrobatidae. It is endemic to Colombia. This frog is found on the leaf litter in cloud forests. It has been observed 1500 meters above sea level.

The IUCN classifies this frog as data deficient, so scientists are not certain of what threat it faces. Its known range includes one protected park: Parque Nacional Natural Paramillo.
