= Helicops hagmanni =

Conservation status
- Least Concern (IUCN 3.1)

Scientific classification
- Kingdom: Animalia
- Phylum: Chordata
- Class: Reptilia
- Order: Squamata
- Suborder: Serpentes
- Family: Colubridae
- Genus: Helicops
- Species: H. hagmanni

Binomial name
- Helicops hagmanni Roux, 1910

Species of snake

Helicops hagmanni, also known commonly as Hagmann's keelback, is a species of snake in the subfamily Dipsadinae of the family Colubridae. The species is native to the Amazon River basin in South America.

== Etymology ==
The specific name, hagmanni, is in honor of Swiss-Brazilian zoologist Gottfried A. Hagmann.

== Geographic range ==
Helicops hagmanni is found in Brazil, Colombia, Peru, and Venezuela.

== Habitat ==
The preferred natural habitat of Helicops hagmanni is freshwater wetlands in forest, at altitudes below 250 m (820 ft).

== Description ==
Helicops hagmanni has 21–29 rows of dorsal scales at midbody. Its subcaudal scales are keeled, and number only 50–59. Its teeth are very long and are nonrecurved.

== Behavior ==
Helicops hagmanni is aquatic.

== Diet ==
Helicops hagmanni preys upon fishes.

== Reproduction ==
Helicops hagmanni is ovoviviparous.
