= Kimberley rocket frog =

Scientific classification
- Kingdom: Animalia
- Phylum: Chordata
- Class: Amphibia
- Order: Anura
- Family: Pelodryadidae
- Genus: Litoria
- Species: L. axillaris

Binomial name
- Litoria axillaris Doughty, 2011

Species of Australian frog

The Kimberley rocket frog (Litoria axillaris) is a species of small frog that is endemic to Western Australia. The species epithet axillaris refers to the stripes on the sides of the body.

== Description ==
The species grows up to 25.5 mm long, and has a triangular head with a pointed snout, and long limbs with half-webbed toes. It is pale greyish-brown with dark lateral stripes extending from the snout through the eyes and along the sides of the body.

== Distribution and habitat ==
The frog has only been recorded from the Prince Regent National Park, in the north-west Kimberley region of north-western Australia, where it has been observed on sandstone rock platforms.

Researchers have heard the male frogs calling in pairs or alone, not in large groups as occurs with other frogs.
