= Menemsorae tree frog =

Conservation status
- Least Concern (IUCN 3.1)

Scientific classification
- Kingdom: Animalia
- Phylum: Chordata
- Class: Amphibia
- Order: Anura
- Family: Pelodryadidae
- Genus: Mahonabatrachus
- Species: M. timidus

Binomial name
- Mahonabatrachus timidus (Tyler & Parker, 1972)

Synonyms
- Litoria timida Tyler & Parker, 1972

Species of amphibian

The Menemsorae tree frog (Mahonabatrachus timidus) is a species of frog in the family Pelodryadidae, found in New Guinea. Its natural habitats are subtropical or tropical moist lowland forests, swamps, rural gardens, and heavily degraded former forests.
