= Tantilla petersi =

Conservation status
- Critically Endangered (IUCN 3.1)

Scientific classification
- Kingdom: Animalia
- Phylum: Chordata
- Class: Reptilia
- Order: Squamata
- Suborder: Serpentes
- Family: Colubridae
- Genus: Tantilla
- Species: T. petersi

Binomial name
- Tantilla petersi Wilson, 1979

Species of snake

Tantilla petersi, also known commonly as Peters's black-headed snake, is a species of snake in the subfamily Colubrinae of the family Colubridae. The species is endemic to Ecuador.

== Etymology ==
The specific name, petersi, is in honor of American herpetologist James Arthur Peters (1922–1972).

== Geographic distribution ==
Tantilla petersi is found in northern Ecuador, in Imbabura Province.

== Habitat ==
The preferred natural habitat of Tantilla petersi is shrubland, at altitudes of 1,668–2,200 m (5,472–7,218 ft).

== Reproduction ==
Tantilla petersi is oviparous.
