= Helicops nentur =

Scientific classification
- Kingdom: Animalia
- Phylum: Chordata
- Class: Reptilia
- Order: Squamata
- Suborder: Serpentes
- Family: Colubridae
- Genus: Helicops
- Species: H. nentur

Binomial name
- Helicops nentur Costa, Santana, Leal, Koroiva & Garcia, 2016

Species of snake

Helicops nentur is a species of snake in the family Colubridae. It is endemic to Brazil.
