= Helicops boitata =

Scientific classification
- Kingdom: Animalia
- Phylum: Chordata
- Class: Reptilia
- Order: Squamata
- Suborder: Serpentes
- Family: Colubridae
- Genus: Helicops
- Species: H. boitata

Binomial name
- Helicops boitata Moares da Silva, Cecilia Amaro, Sales-Nunes, Strassmann, Teixeira, Andrade, Sudre, Recoder, Rodrigues, & Curcio, 2019

Species of snake

Helicops boitata is a species of snake in the family Colubridae. It is endemic to the state of Mato Grosso in Brazil.
