= Helicops modestus =

Conservation status
- Least Concern (IUCN 3.1)

Scientific classification
- Kingdom: Animalia
- Phylum: Chordata
- Class: Reptilia
- Order: Squamata
- Suborder: Serpentes
- Family: Colubridae
- Genus: Helicops
- Species: H. modestus

Binomial name
- Helicops modestus Günther, 1861

Species of snake

Helicops modestus, the olive keelback, is a species of snake in the family Colubridae. It is endemic to Brazil, and can be found in the states of São Paulo, Rio de Janeiro, Minas Gerais, Mato Grosso do Sul, Goiás, and the Federal District of Brasília.
