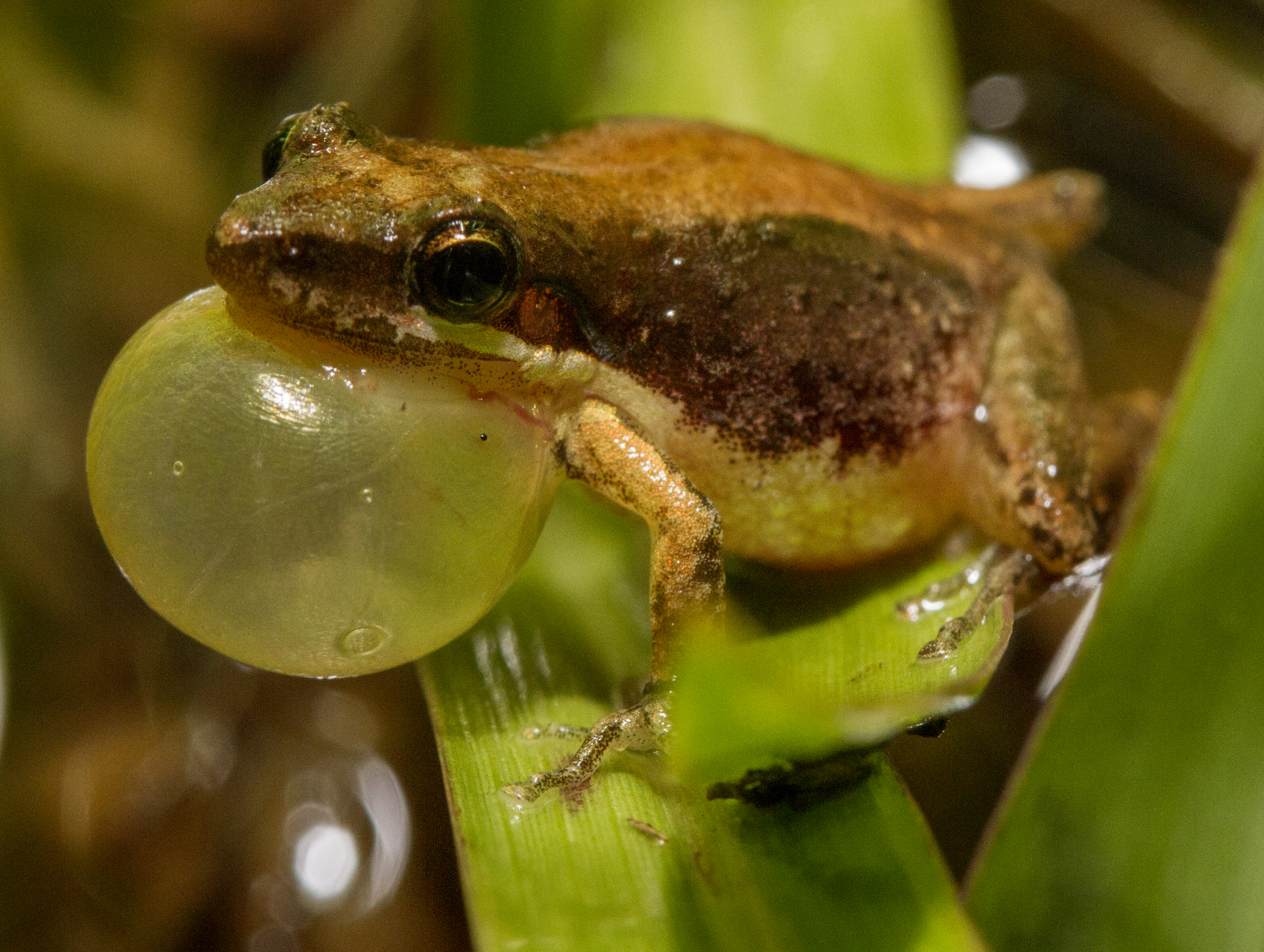

Conservation status
- Least Concern (IUCN 3.1)

Scientific classification
- Kingdom: Animalia
- Phylum: Chordata
- Class: Amphibia
- Order: Anura
- Family: Pelodryadidae
- Genus: Mahonabatrachus
- Species: M. microbelos

Binomial name
- Mahonabatrachus microbelos (Cogger, 1966)

Synonyms
- Llewellynura microbelos Wells and Wellington, 1985; H. d. microbelos Cogger, 1966; Litoria microbelos Cogger, 1966

= Javelin frog =

Species of amphibian

call of Litoria microbelos

The javelin frog (Mahonabatrachus microbelos) is a species of frog in the family Pelodryadidae, that is endemic to Australia. Its natural habitats are subtropical or tropical dry lowland grassland, swamps, and intermittent freshwater marshes.

== Description ==
The javelin frog is the smallest known tree frog in Australia, with males reaching 16 mm (0.63 in) and females 18 mm (0.71 in) in length. Colours are typically brown with a light-brown dorsal surface, dark-brown lateral stripes and light, almost white, ventral surface. A white stripe runs along the lip and along the side of the frog.
