= Colostethus ucumari =

Conservation status
- Endangered (IUCN 3.1)

Scientific classification
- Kingdom: Animalia
- Phylum: Chordata
- Class: Amphibia
- Order: Anura
- Family: Dendrobatidae
- Genus: Colostethus
- Species: C. ucumari

Binomial name
- Colostethus ucumari (Cochran and Goin, 1964)

Synonyms
- Phyllobates ucumari Cochran and Goin, 1964

Species of frog

Colostethus ucumari is a species of frog in the family Dendrobatidae. It is endemic to Colombia.

== Description ==
This frog has a light dorsolateral stripe and almost no webbed skin on its feet. The frog has bright yellow flash coloration in the axilla and groin. Its ventral surfaces are blue-white in color.

This frog secretes some chemicals from its skin.

== Habitat ==
Scientists have observed this frog in riparian habitats in cloud forests in Colombia's Cordillera Central. Scientists saw the frog between 2100 and 2500 meters above sea level on grassy vegetation or under rocks.

The frog's range includes Parque Nacional Ucumarí and Parque Natural Regional La Pastora.

== Reproduction ==
After the eggs hatch, the male frog carries the tadpoles to water.

== Threats ==
The IUCN classifies this frog as endangered. The principal threats are habitat loss associated with cattle grazing and predation by rainbow trout. Scientists have detected Batrachochytrium dendrobatidis in the frog's range, but they do not know if chytridiomycosis has caused any notable decline in the population.
