= Colostethus mertensi =

Conservation status
- Vulnerable (IUCN 3.1)

Scientific classification
- Kingdom: Animalia
- Phylum: Chordata
- Class: Amphibia
- Order: Anura
- Family: Dendrobatidae
- Genus: Colostethus
- Species: C. mertensi

Binomial name
- Colostethus mertensi (Cochran & Goin, 1964)

Species of frog

Colostethus mertensi is a species of frog in the family Dendrobatidae, Endemic to Colombia.

== Habitat ==
This terrestrial frog has been observed in cloud forests between 2100 and 2350 meters above sea level.

The frog's known range includes one protected park: Munchique National Park.

== Reproduction ==
The female frog lays eggs on the ground. After the eggs hatch, the male frog carries the tadpoles to temporary ponds.

== Threats ==
The IUCN classifies this frog as vulnerable to extinction. Its principal threats are habitat loss in the form of deforestation in favor of agriculture, both legitimate farms such as eucalyptus plantations and illegal crops, logging, and human habitation.
