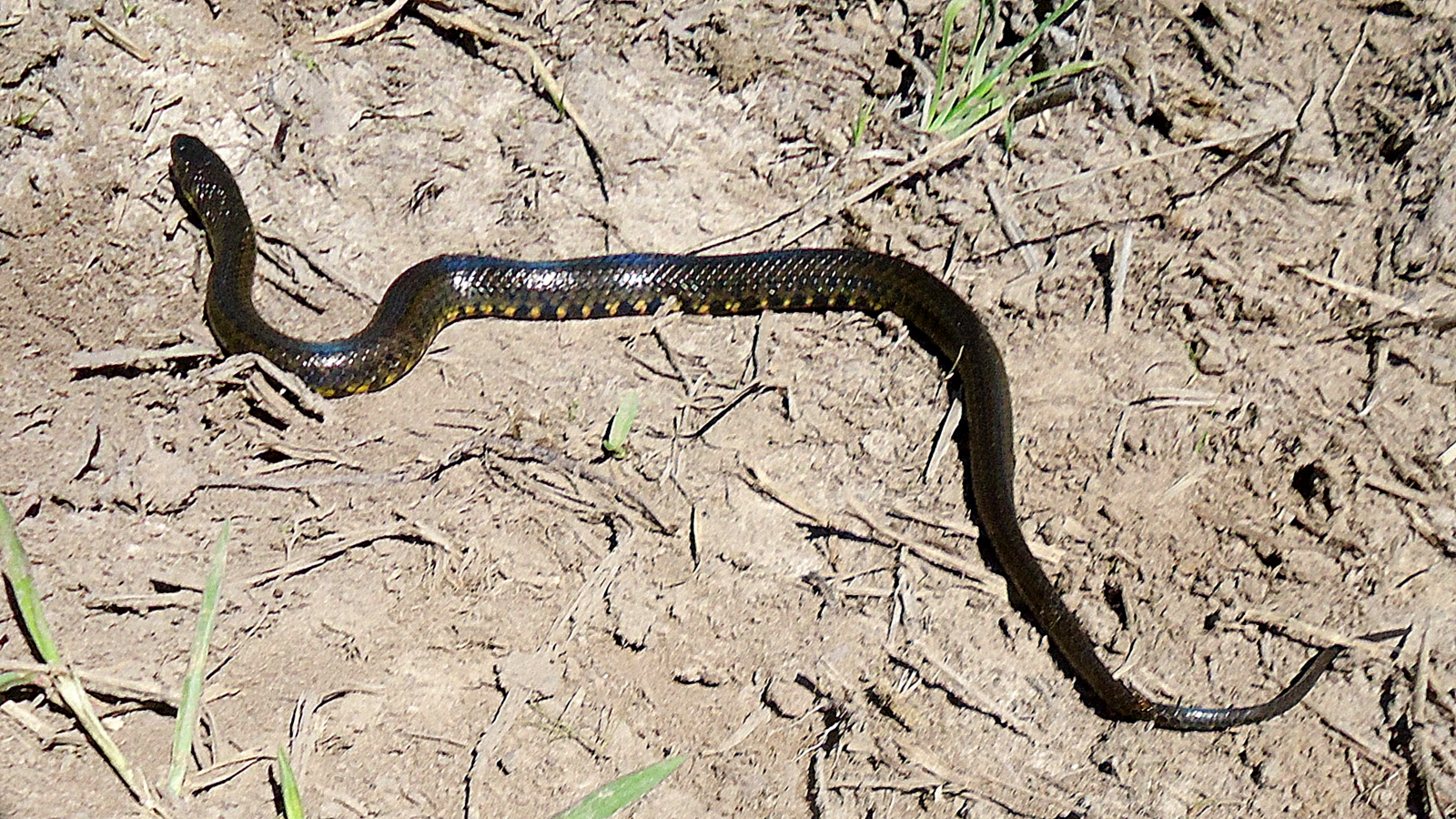

Conservation status
- Least Concern (IUCN 3.1)

Scientific classification
- Kingdom: Animalia
- Phylum: Chordata
- Class: Reptilia
- Order: Squamata
- Suborder: Serpentes
- Family: Colubridae
- Genus: Helicops
- Species: H. leopardinus

Binomial name
- Helicops leopardinus (Schlegel, 1837)

= Helicops leopardinus =

Species of snake

Helicops leopardinus, the leopard keelback, is a species of snake in the family Colubridae. It is endemic to South America, and can be found in Argentina, Bolivia, Brazil, Ecuador, French Guiana, Guyana, Paraguay, Peru, and Suriname.
