= Helicops polylepis =

Conservation status
- Least Concern (IUCN 3.1)

Scientific classification
- Kingdom: Animalia
- Phylum: Chordata
- Class: Reptilia
- Order: Squamata
- Suborder: Serpentes
- Family: Colubridae
- Genus: Helicops
- Species: H. polylepis

Binomial name
- Helicops polylepis Günther, 1861

Species of snake

Helicops polylepis, Norman's keelback, is a species of snake in the family Colubridae. It is found in Brazil, Colombia, Peru, and Bolivia.
