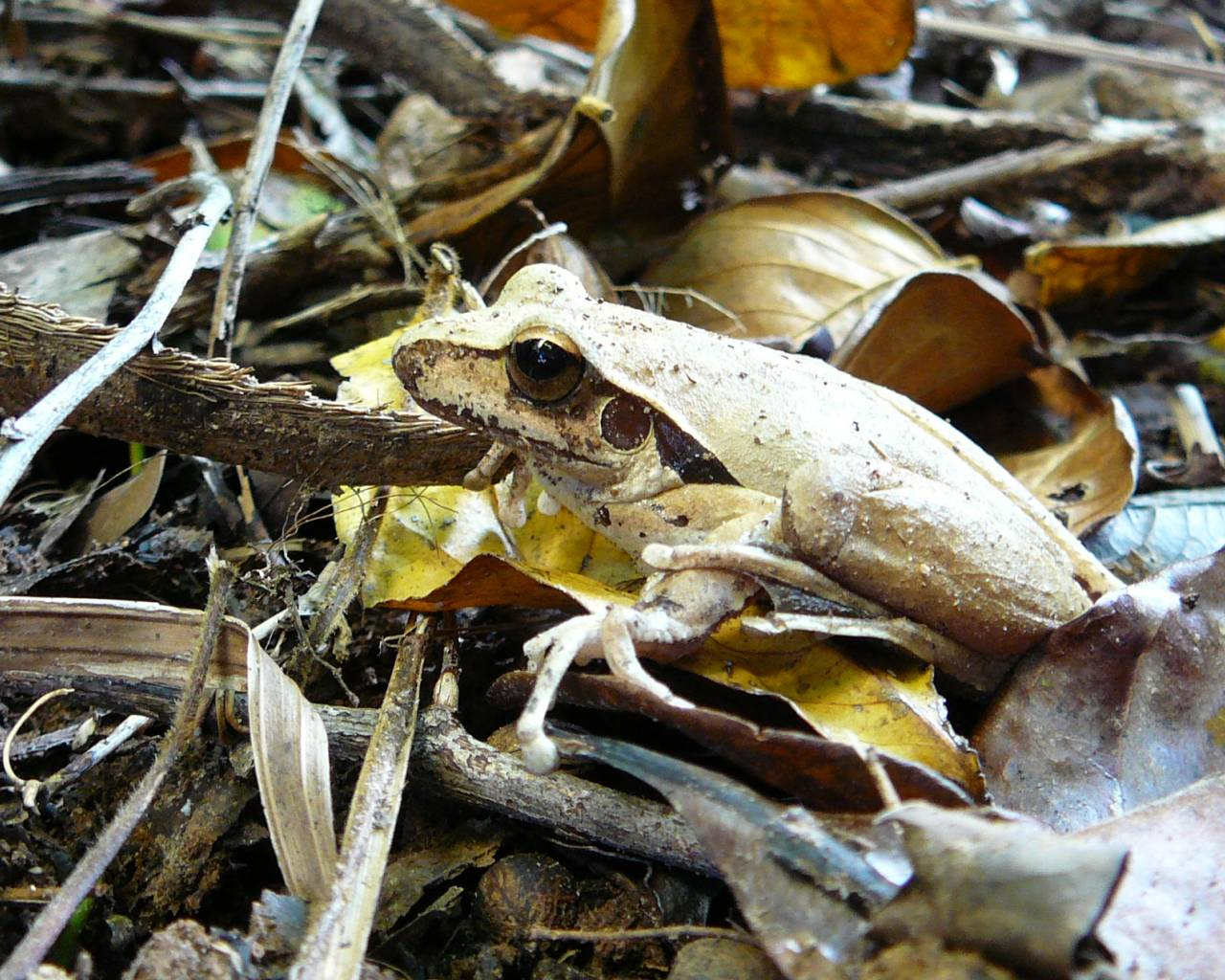

Conservation status
- Least Concern (IUCN 3.1)

Scientific classification
- Kingdom: Animalia
- Phylum: Chordata
- Class: Amphibia
- Order: Anura
- Family: Hylidae
- Genus: Litoria
- Species: L. nigrofrenata

Binomial name
- Litoria nigrofrenata (Günther, 1867)

= Bridled frog =

Species of amphibian

The bridled frog (Litoria nigrofrenata) is a species of frog in the subfamily Pelodryadinae. It is found in Australia and New Guinea. Its natural habitats are subtropical or tropical dry forests, moist savanna, intermittent rivers, swamps, intermittent freshwater marshes, and ponds. It is threatened by habitat loss.
