= Helicops apiaka =

Conservation status
- Least Concern (IUCN 3.1)

Scientific classification
- Kingdom: Animalia
- Phylum: Chordata
- Class: Reptilia
- Order: Squamata
- Suborder: Serpentes
- Family: Colubridae
- Genus: Helicops
- Species: H. apiaka

Binomial name
- Helicops apiaka Kawashita-Ribeiro, Ávila & Morais, 2013

Species of snake

Helicops apiaka is a species of snake in the family Colubridae. It is endemic to Brazil, in the state of Mato Grosso. Its known distribution includes northern Mato Grosso and southern Pará.
