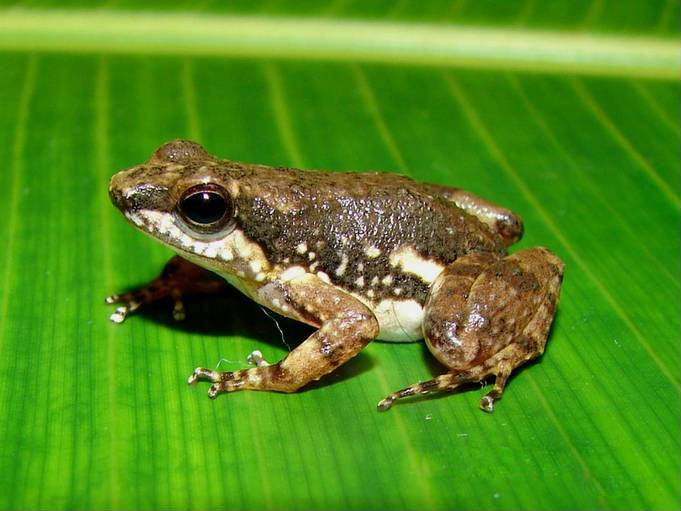

Conservation status
- Least Concern (IUCN 3.1)

Scientific classification
- Kingdom: Animalia
- Phylum: Chordata
- Class: Amphibia
- Order: Anura
- Family: Dendrobatidae
- Genus: Colostethus
- Species: C. inguinalis

Binomial name
- Colostethus inguinalis (Cope, 1868)

Synonyms
- Prostherapis inguinalis Cope, 1868; Phyllobates inguinalis (Cope, 1868); Colostethus cacerensis Rivero and Serna, 2000 "1995"

= Colostethus inguinalis =

Species of frog

Colostethus inguinalis is a species of frog in the family Dendrobatidae. It is endemic to northwestern and northcentral Colombia. Its vernacular name is common rocket frog, although this name can also refer to Colostethus panamansis that until 2004 was considered a junior synonym of Colostethus inguinalis. Much of the older literature on Colostethus inguinalis is actually about Colostethus panamansis.

== Description ==
Adult males measure 22–27 mm (0.87–1.06 in) and adult females 23–30 mm (0.91–1.18 in) in snout–vent length. The tympanum is well-defined and pale anteriorly. An oblique lateral pale line extends halfway from groin to the eye- Adult males with solid black throat, with the black pigmentation usually extending onto the chest and the anterior belly; adult females have white (unpigmented) or faintly pigmented gray or brown chest. The toes are moderately webbed. Adult males have swollen third finger.

== Reproduction ==
The female frog lays eggs on the leaf litter. After the eggs hatch, the adult frogs carry the tadpoles to streams for further development.

== Habitat and conservation ==
Colostethus inguinalis is a diurnal species of humid lowland forests at elevations of 0–400 m (0–1,312 ft) or 300–800 m (980–2,620 ft) above sea level, depending on the source. It often occurs along rocky sections of forest streams. The eggs are laid in leaf litter; the adults carry the tadpoles to streams.

It is an abundant species, but deforestation for agricultural development, logging, human settlement, illegal crops, and pollution resulting from the spraying of illegal crops is a major threat; it is suspected that the overall population is declining. This species can be found in a number of protected areas.
