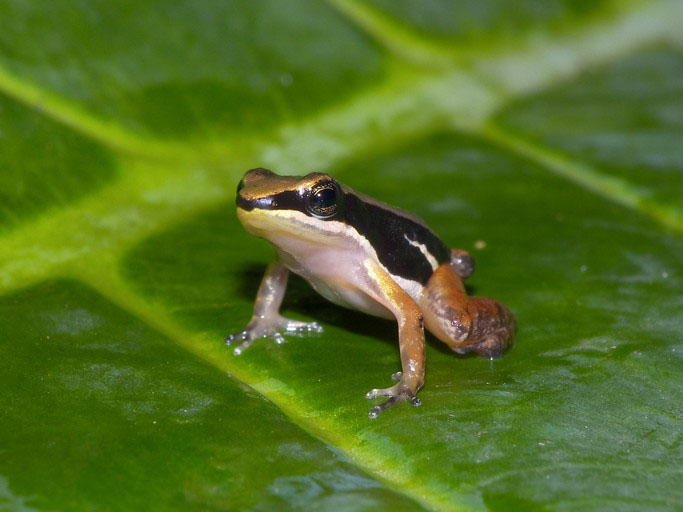
- Colostethus pratti

Scientific classification
- Domain: Eukaryota
- Kingdom: Animalia
- Phylum: Chordata
- Class: Amphibia
- Order: Anura
- Family: Dendrobatidae
- Subfamily: Colostethinae
- Genus: Colostethus; Cope, 1866

Diversity
- 12 species (see text)

Synonyms
- Prostherapis Cope, 1868

= Colostethus =

Genus of amphibians

Colostethus is a genus of poison dart frogs native to Central and South America, from Panama south to Colombia, Ecuador, and northern Peru. Their common name is rocket frogs, but this name may refer to frogs in other genera and families, following the taxonomic revision of the genus in 2006.

== Taxonomy ==
Formerly, the genus Colostethus was found to be "rampantly nonmonophyletic" in the taxonomic revision of poison dart frogs published in 2006. Before the revision, it had 138 species, but this was reduced to 18 species, after species of the former Colostethus were distributed among eight genera in two families, that is, in Dendrobatidae and in the newly established family Aromobatidae (e..g., Anomaloglossus). Within Dendrobatidae, many former Colostethus species were moved to Hyloxalus, while three were moved to the new genus Silverstoneia. Nevertheless, Colostethus is still considered paraphyletic because some Colostethus are more closely related to Ameerega than to other Colostethus.

== Description ==
Dorsal colouration is cryptic, brown. A pale oblique lateral stripe is present (but may be broken or incomplete). Dorsal skin is granular posteriorly. In adult males, third finger is swollen.

== Species ==
There are currently 12 species in this genus:

- Colostethus agilis Lynch and Ruiz-Carranza, 1985
- Colostethus furviventris Rivero and Serna, 1991
- Colostethus imbricolus Silverstone, 1975
- Colostethus inguinalis (Cope, 1868)
- Colostethus jacobuspetersi Rivero, 1991
- Colostethus latinasus (Cope, 1863)
- Colostethus lynchi Grant, 1998
- Colostethus mertensi (Cochran and Goin, 1964)
- Colostethus panamansis (Dunn, 1933)
- Colostethus pratti (Boulenger, 1899)
- Colostethus thorntoni (Cochran and Goin, 1970)
- Colostethus ucumari Grant, 2007
