= Colostethus lynchi =

Conservation status
- Data Deficient (IUCN 3.1)

Scientific classification
- Kingdom: Animalia
- Phylum: Chordata
- Class: Amphibia
- Order: Anura
- Family: Dendrobatidae
- Genus: Colostethus
- Species: C. lynchi

Binomial name
- Colostethus lynchi T. Grant, 1998

Species of frog

Colostethus lynchi is a species of frog in the family Dendrobatidae. It is endemic to Colombia.

The IUCN classifies this frog as data deficient. Scientists observed it 30 m above sea level in a forest, but they know little else about its habits. Scientists believe it is likely that this frog breeds in streams, like its congeners.
