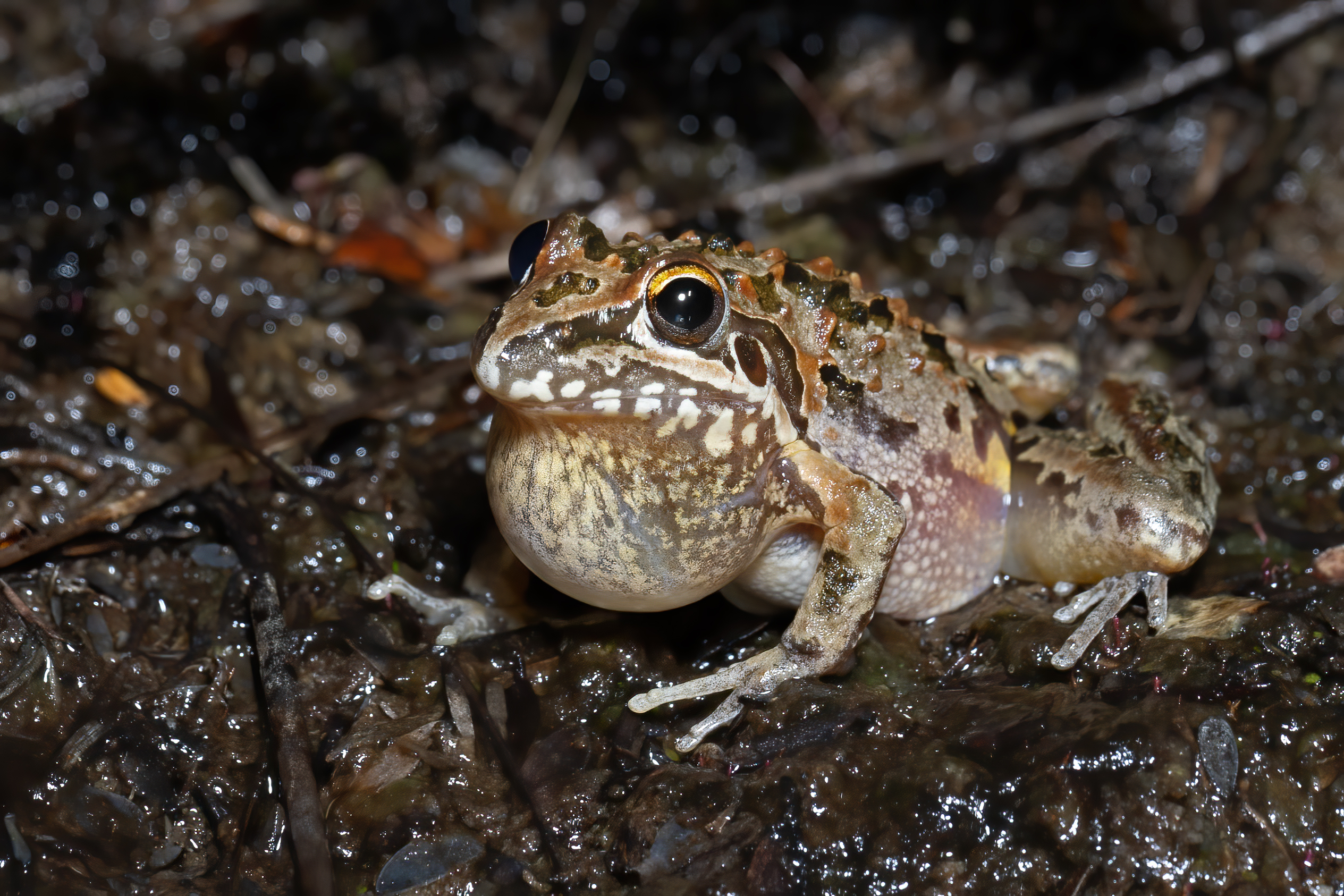

Conservation status
- Vulnerable (IUCN 3.1)

Scientific classification
- Kingdom: Animalia
- Phylum: Chordata
- Class: Amphibia
- Order: Anura
- Family: Pelodryadidae
- Genus: Litoria
- Species: L. freycineti

Binomial name
- Litoria freycineti Tschudi, 1838
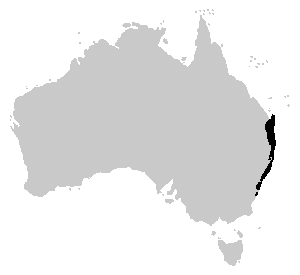
- Range of Freycinet's frog

= Freycinet's frog =

Species of amphibian

Freycinet's frog (Litoria freycineti), also known as the wallum rocket frog, is a species of frog. It inhabits coastal areas from Fraser Island, Queensland, south to the Jervis Bay Territory of New South Wales.

== Description ==
This is a variable species of frog, reaching 45 mm in length. It is normally brown on the dorsal surface with large lighter or darker patches or raised dots; in some specimens, these patches can be very indistinct to almost nonexistent. A triangular shape of the same colour as the patches is present on the snout, another larger triangular shape is present behind the eyes, almost looking like a reflection to the one on the snout. The iris is a rusty colour in the upper half and brown-grey in the bottom. A white bar extends from in front of the eye around the tympanum and to the arm. The lower lip is marbled black and white. The pads on the fingers are small. The underbelly is white and the throat in males is darker.

== Ecology and behaviour ==
Despite its name, this species occurs as frequently in sandstone heath habitats as it does in wallum swamps. The call of the male is a duck-like "wak", similar to that of Litoria latopalmata, although slower. Males will call on warm nights, in spring and summer, often after rain. Breeding takes place in any and all bodies of water the frogs can find, from large swamps, to creeks (stream-side pools are normally used), to temporary puddles (which may depend on follow-up rainfall to see the tadpoles reach metamorphosis).
