= Colostethus jacobuspetersi =

Conservation status
- Critically Endangered (IUCN 3.1)

Scientific classification
- Kingdom: Animalia
- Phylum: Chordata
- Class: Amphibia
- Order: Anura
- Family: Dendrobatidae
- Genus: Colostethus
- Species: C. jacobuspetersi

Binomial name
- Colostethus jacobuspetersi Rivero, 1991

Synonyms
- Colostethus torrenticola Rivero, 1991

Species of frog

Colostethus jacobuspetersi, commonly known as the Quito rocket frog, is a species of frog in the family Dendrobatidae.

== Body ==
The adult male frog measures 19.3–25.1 mm in snout-vent length and the adult female 22.3–29.5 mm. The skin of the dorsum is light brown with some green coloration and dark red-brown marks. There is a white line down each side of the body and another white line on the upper lip. The belly is pinkish orange in color with white spots or patterning. The throat and chest are light orange with white marks. The ventral surfaces of the legs and feet are light pink. The male frog's testicles are white.

== Etymology ==
Scientists named this frog for amphibian collector and explorer James Peters of the Smithsonian.

== Habitat ==
This diurnal frog lives in highland forests and artificial open spaces. It has been sighted next to ditches and canals. It has been observed between 1500 and 3800 meters above sea level.

Scientists are sure they saw the frog in 1990 in Cashca Totoras Protective Forest. The frog's former range included or came near Reserva Ecológica Los Illinizas, Reserva Geobotánica Pululahua, and Reserva de Producción Faunística Chimborazo.

== Threats ==
The last formal sighting of this frog took place in 1990 in Cashca Totoras Protective Forest. In 2019, scientists heard the frog singing and saw tadpoles and young frogs.

The IUCN classifies this frog as critically endangered. Habitat loss through deforestation in favor of agriculture and human habitation are the principal threats. There is currently no forest left in the frog's former known range. Chytridiomycosis has killed many other amphibians in the area and may also have killed many of these frogs.

In 2015, the volcano Volcan Cotopaxi became active again. This may also have killed these frogs.
