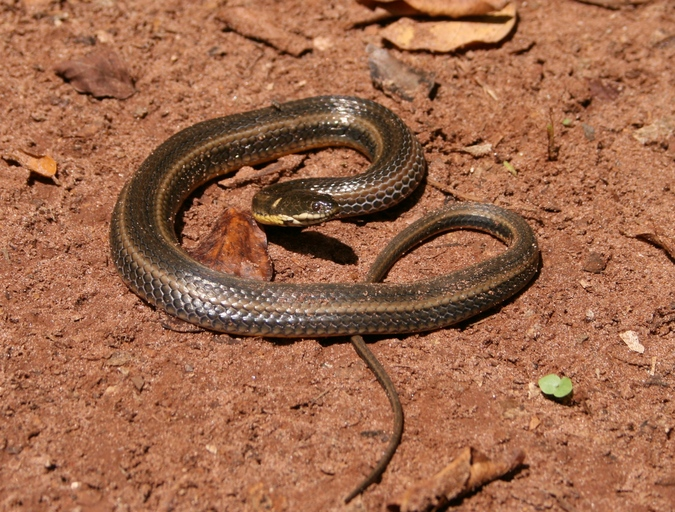

Conservation status
- Least Concern (IUCN 3.1)

Scientific classification
- Kingdom: Animalia
- Phylum: Chordata
- Class: Reptilia
- Order: Squamata
- Suborder: Serpentes
- Family: Colubridae
- Genus: Helicops
- Species: H. infrataeniatus

Binomial name
- Helicops infrataeniatus Jan, 1865

= Helicops infrataeniatus =

Species of snake

Helicops infrataeniatus is a species of snake in the family Colubridae. It is endemic to South America, and can be found in Uruguay, Argentina, Paraguay, and southern Brazil.
