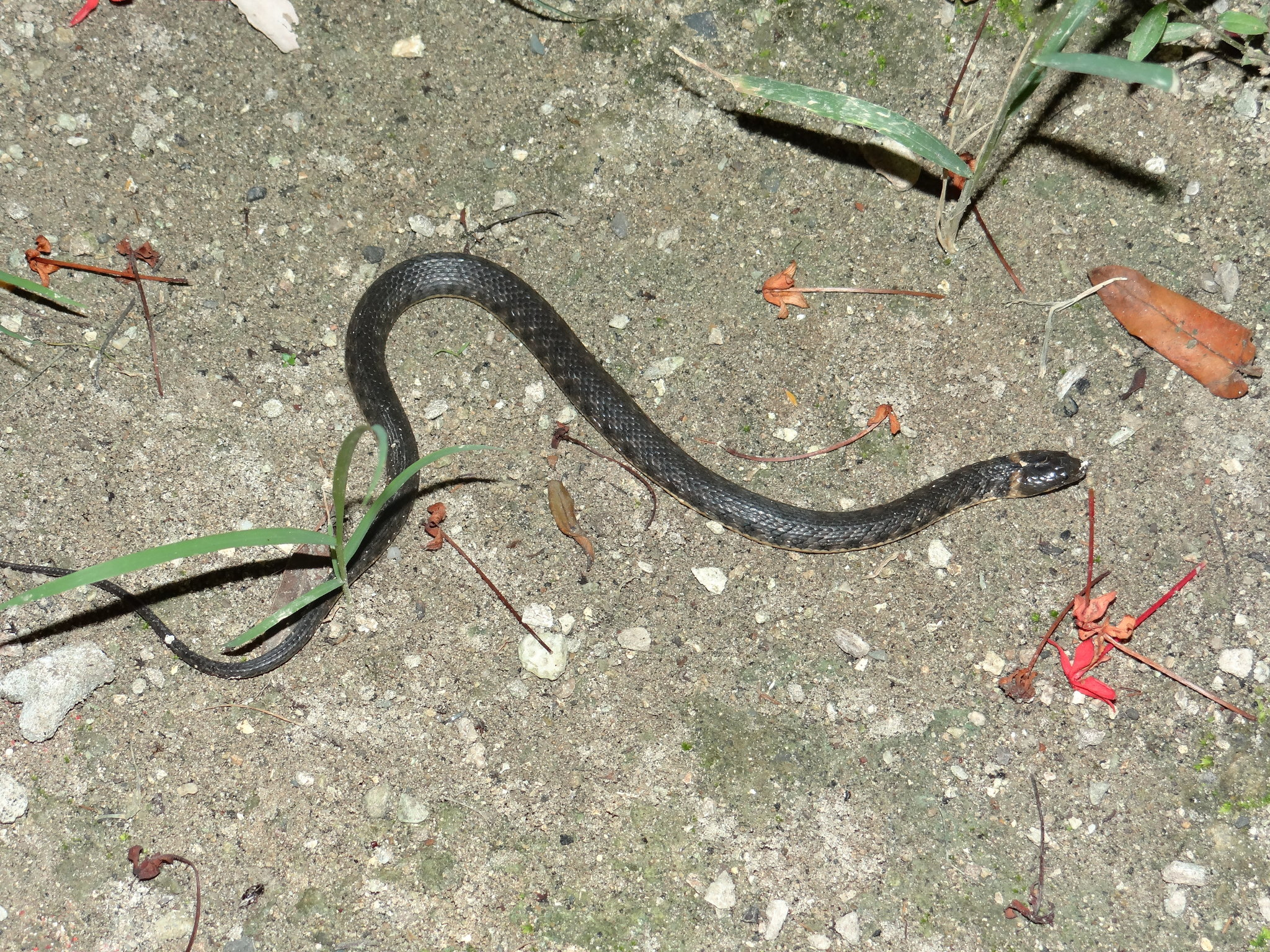

Conservation status
- Least Concern (IUCN 3.1)

Scientific classification
- Kingdom: Animalia
- Phylum: Chordata
- Class: Reptilia
- Order: Squamata
- Suborder: Serpentes
- Family: Colubridae
- Genus: Helicops
- Species: H. danieli

Binomial name
- Helicops danieli Amaral, 1938

= Helicops danieli =

Species of snake

Helicops danieli, also known commonly as Daniel's keelback, is a species of snake in the subfamily Dipsadinae of the family Colubridae. The species is endemic to Colombia.

== Etymology ==
The specific name, danieli, is in honor of Colombian monk Brother Daniel Gonzalez Patiño (1909–1988), who was Director of the Museo de Storia Natural, Instituto de La Salle in Bogotá.

== Geographic distribution ==
Helicops danieli is found in northwestern Colombia.

== Habitat ==
The preferred natural habitat of Helicops danieli is forest, at elevations from near sea level to 500 m (1,600 ft).

== Behavior ==
Helicops danieli is terrestrial and semi-aquatic.

== Reproduction ==
Helicops danieli is ovoviviparous.
