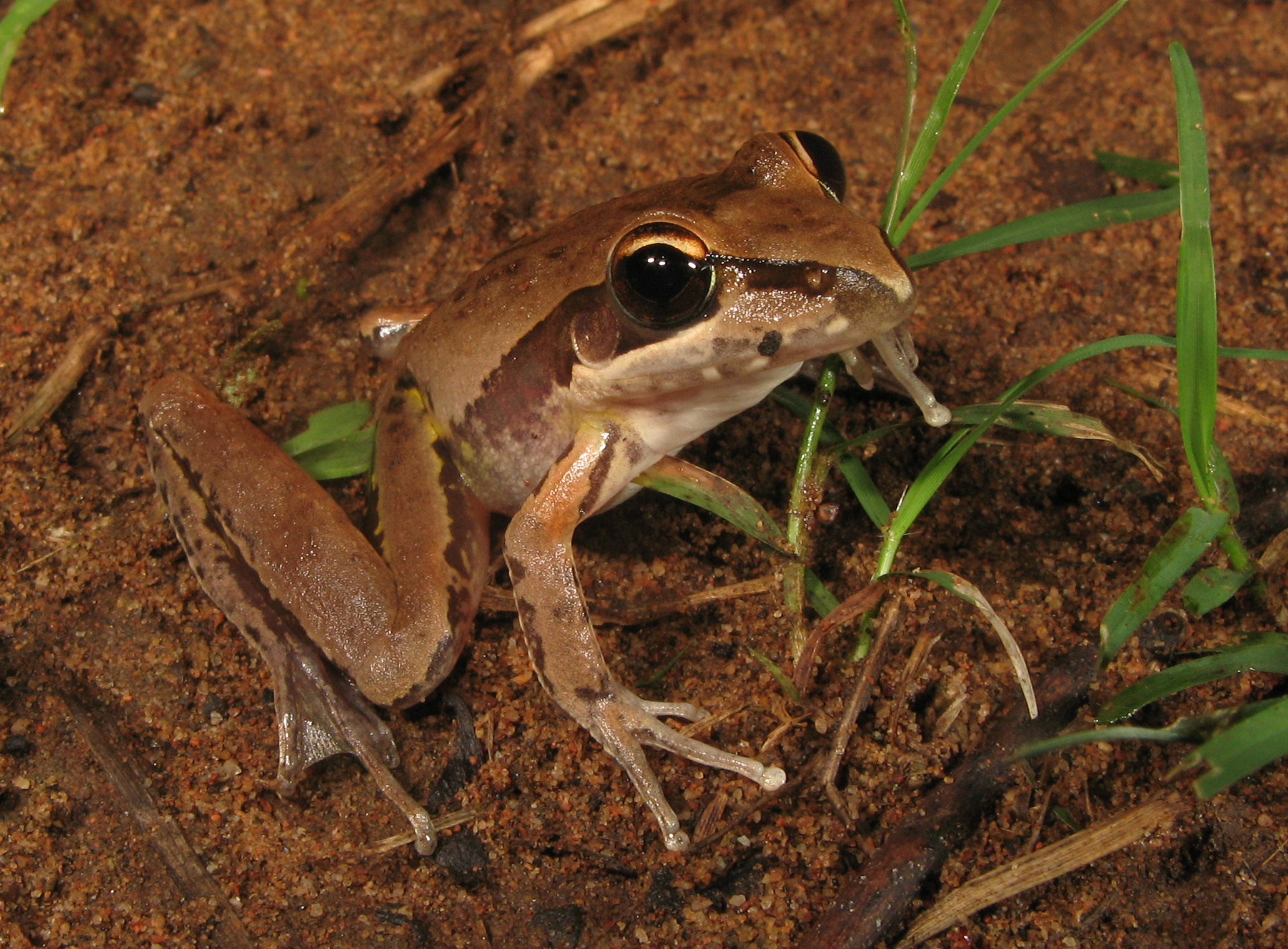
- Watjulum frog (Litoria wajulumensis) in the Kimberley, Western Australia

Scientific classification
- Kingdom: Animalia
- Phylum: Chordata
- Class: Amphibia
- Order: Anura
- Family: Pelodryadidae
- Subfamily: Pelodryadinae
- Genus: Litoria; Tschudi, 1838

Species
- See text

= Litoria =

Litoria Temporal range: Early Eocene to present

Genus of amphibians

Litoria is a genus of Pelodryadid treefrogs, which was historically a wastebasket taxon for the most or all of the family, until a 2025 phylogenetic study separated the family into 35 genera.

== Description ==
The species within the genus Litoria have similar appearances, ranging from grey to brown, although some species exhibit some red colouration, warts or rough skin that helps differentiate their appearance. Most Litoria have a sharper snout than other Pelodryadidae, and many have very large legs and can jump long distances.

== Distribution and habitat ==
The frogs are native to Australia, with the highest diversity found in northern Australia, though three species are found in the cooler climates of south-eastern Australia.

== Species ==
After the splitting of Pelodryadidae, the number of recognised species in the genus reduced from over 100 to just thirteen.

- Litoria axillaris Doughty, 2011 - Kimberley rocket frog
- Litoria coplandi (Tyler, 1968) - Copland's rock frog
- Litoria freycineti Tschudi, 1838 - Freycinet's frog
- Litoria inermis (Peters, 1867) - Bumpy rocket frog
- Litoria latopalmata Günther, 1867 - Broad-palmed frog
- Litoria nasuta (Gray, 1842) - Striped rocket frog
- Litoria nigrofrenata (Günther, 1867) - Bridled frog
- Litoria pallida Davies, Martin, and Watson, 1983 - Pale frog
- Litoria personata Tyler, Davies, and Martin, 1978 - Masked frog
- Litoria spaldingi (Hosmer, 1964)
- Litoria staccato Doughty and Anstis, 2007 - Chattering rock frog
- Litoria tornieri (Nieden, 1923) - Tornier's frog
- Litoria watjulumensis (Copland, 1957) - Watjulum frog

== Bibliography ==
- Frogs of Australia. Litoria genus . Amphibian Research Centre.
- Frogs Australia Network search: Litoria
- Cogger, H.G. 1979. Reptiles & Amphibians of Australia. A. H. & A. W. REED PTY LTD ISBN 0-589-50108-9
- Tyler, Michael J. 1992. Encyclopedia of Australian Animals: Frogs. Angus & Robertson. ISBN 0-207-15996-3
