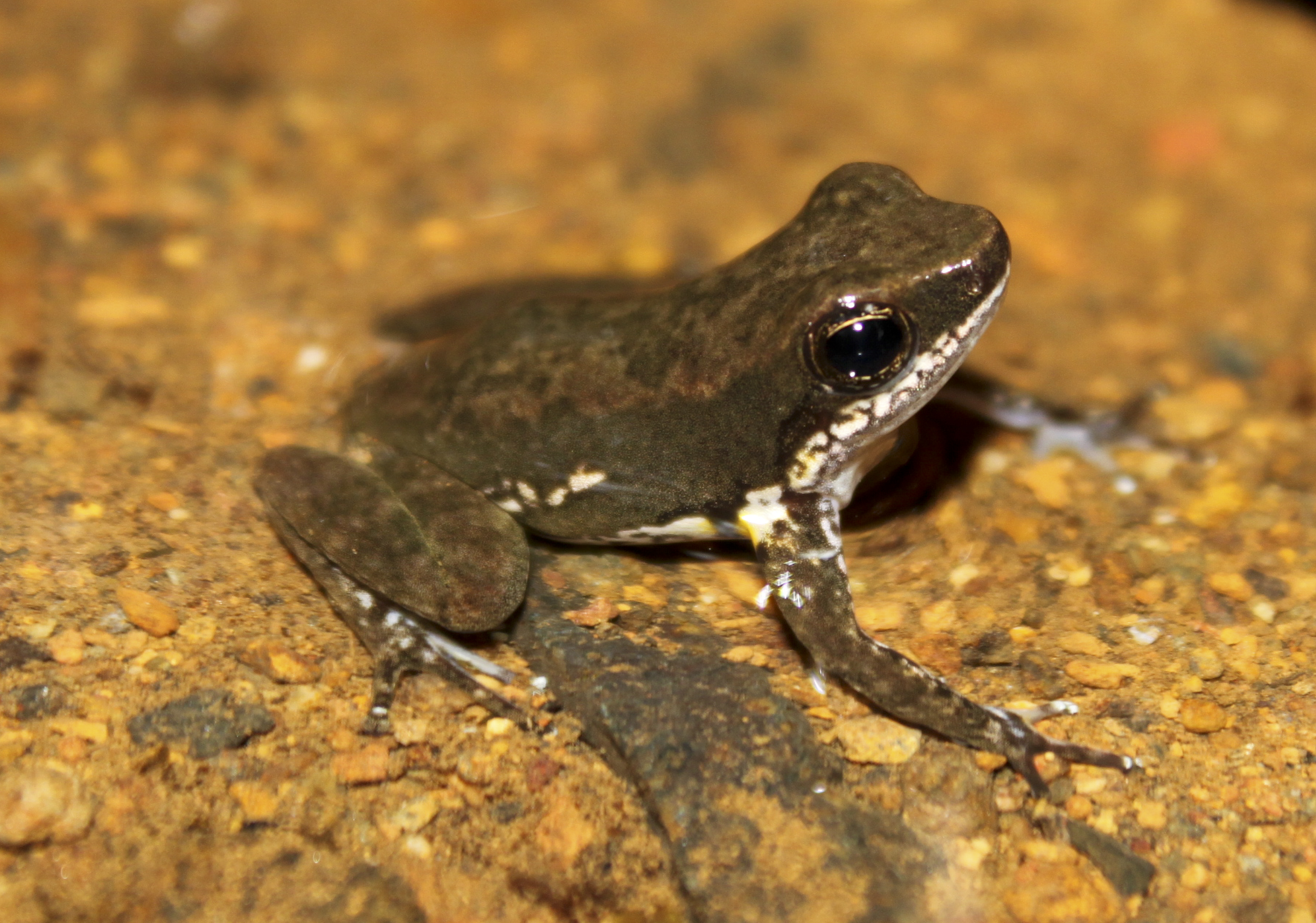

Conservation status
- Least Concern (IUCN 3.1)

Scientific classification
- Kingdom: Animalia
- Phylum: Chordata
- Class: Amphibia
- Order: Anura
- Family: Dendrobatidae
- Genus: Colostethus
- Species: C. panamansis

Binomial name
- Colostethus panamansis (Dunn, 1933)

Synonyms
- Hyloxalus panamansis Dunn, 1933; Colostethus panamensis (incorrect spelling)

= Colostethus panamansis =

Species of amphibian

Colostethus panamansis, also known as the Panama rocket frog or (ambiguously) common rocket frog, is a species of poison dart frog. It is found in northwestern Colombia and Panama. It is one of the best studied poison dart frogs; however, until 2004 Colostethus panamansis was considered a synonym of Colostethus inguinalis, and consequently the older literature uses that name.

== Distribution and habitat ==
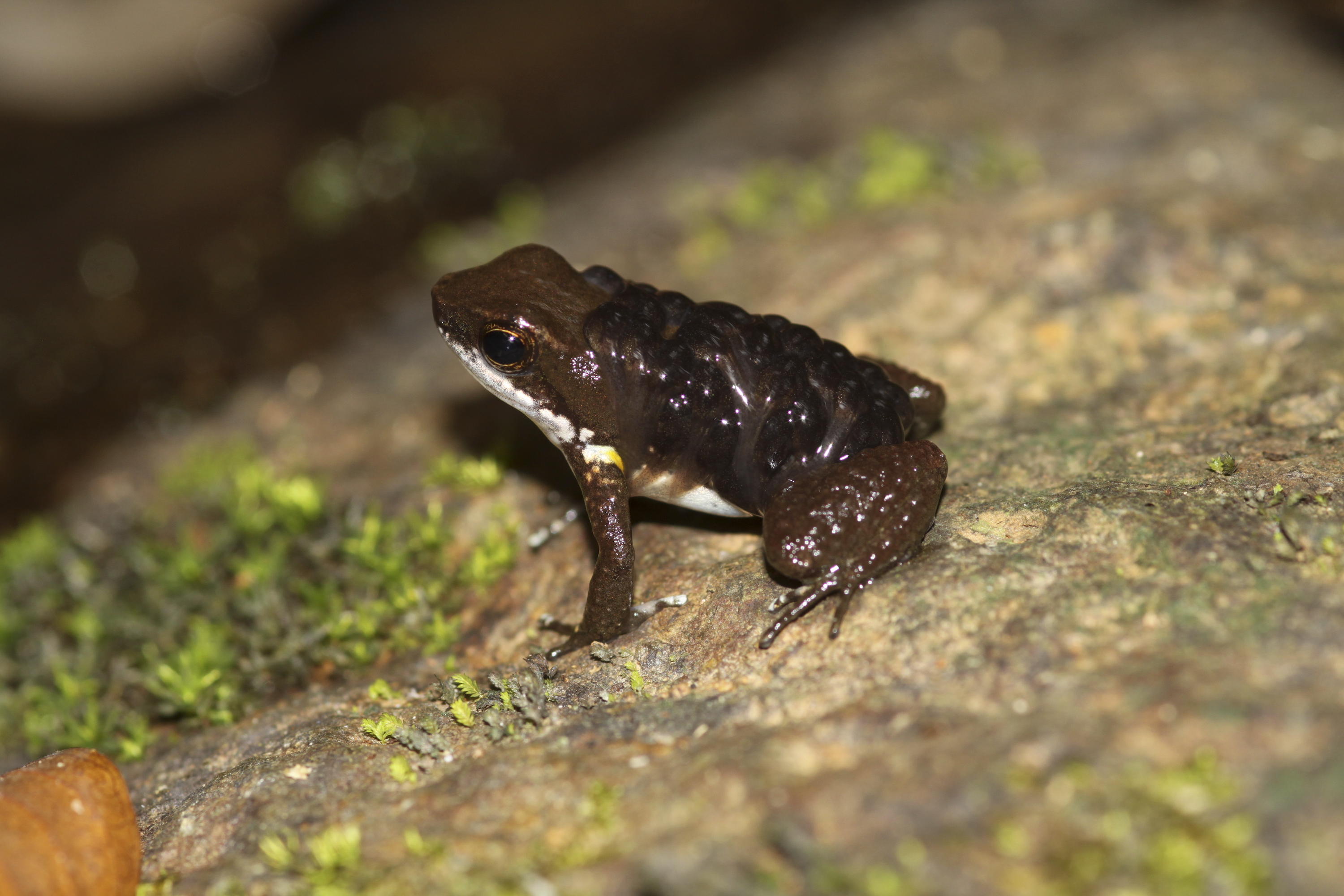
Female carrying tadpoles on her back

Colostethus panamansis is found in several parts of Panama and in Parque Nacional Natural Los Katios in Colombia. It is found living near streams in forested lowland and hilly country, usually at elevations below 800 metres (2,600 ft). Scientists did observe some frogs in Los Katios, about 900 metres (3,000 ft) above sea level.

== Description ==
Adult males measure 19–27 mm (0.75–1.06 in) in snout–vent length and adult females 25–29 mm (0.98–1.14 in). One way scientists distinguish this frog from similar species is that the adult male has a light-colored throat instead of a black throat. The skin of the dorsum is a mix of light and dark brown. There is a dark brown stripe beginning at the eye going down each side of the body, with a white stripe within it. The tympanum is dark brown in color. There is some yellow or yellow-gold coloration on the bottoms of the hind legs and where the forelegs meet the body. The adult male frog usually has a light-colored ventrum, either uniform or with minimal speckles. The female frogs' ventral areas can vary.

== Reproduction ==
Both male and female frogs show territorial behavior, with males fighting other males and females fighting other females. Both will attack frogs of the species C. pratti.

The female lays her eggs in clutches among leaf litter. When they hatch, she carries them around on her back for up to nine days when she immerses herself in a fast flowing stream and they become detached and continue their development in the water. One female was spotted with forty tadpoles on her back at once, so it is inferred that the female carries the entire clutch in one trip rather than returning to the egg-laying site. Scientists are not certain how the tadpoles are nourished given that the trip can take her nine days. Their yolk sacs are notably small.

C. panamansis and C. pratti are the only two species in Colostethus known to practice maternal care. In all other species in the genus, it is the male frog who carries the tadpoles after hatching.

== Research ==
The pathogenic fungus Batrachochytrium dendrobatidis causes the emerging infectious disease chytridiomycosis which is the cause of the decline in many species of tropical amphibian. Colostethus panamansis was used to demonstrate that the fungus was indeed the pathogen responsible for the disease. Healthy rocket frogs from El Copé in Panama were collected and shown to be free of B. dendrobatidis. They were then exposed to an isolate of the fungus. Some of these died and from these B. dendrobatidis was reisolated and was demonstrated to be identical to the original infective agent thus fulfilling Koch's postulates.

This poison in this frog's skin is tetrodotoxin, a sodium channel blocker.

== Conservation status ==
Colostethus panamansis is listed as being of "Least Concern" in the IUCN Red List of Threatened Species. This is because it has a wide range in which it is common, and though the population may be declining, this is not at a rate to allow it to qualify for a higher category. The chief threats it faces are deforestation, logging and farming activities including pollution of streams with pesticides. Scientists also consider this frog particularly susceptible to the fungal disease chytridiomycosis and have advocated a captive breeding program.
