= Dwarf rocket frog =

Conservation status
- Least Concern (IUCN 3.1)

Scientific classification
- Kingdom: Animalia
- Phylum: Chordata
- Class: Amphibia
- Order: Anura
- Family: Pelodryadidae
- Genus: Mahonabatrachus
- Species: M. dorsalis

Binomial name
- Mahonabatrachus dorsalis (Macleay, 1877)

Synonyms
- Litoria dorsalis Macleay, 1877

Species of amphibian

The dwarf rocket frog (Mahonabatrachus dorsalis) is a species of frog in the subfamily Pelodryadinae.

It is found in New Guinea and its natural habitats are subtropical or tropical dry forests, subtropical or tropical moist lowland forests, moist savanna, intermittent freshwater marshes, rural gardens, and heavily degraded former forests.
