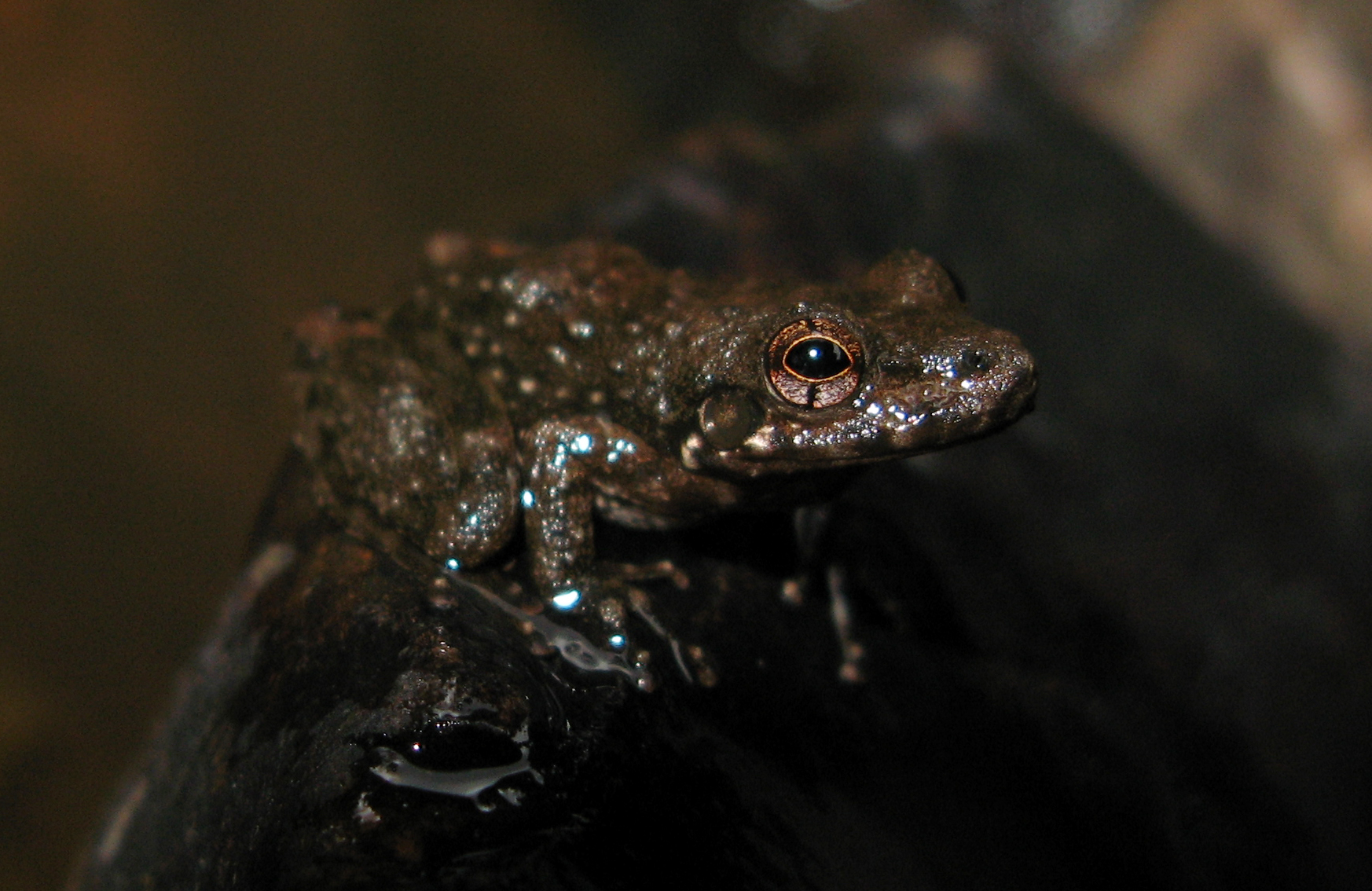

Conservation status
- Least Concern (IUCN 3.1)

Scientific classification
- Kingdom: Animalia
- Phylum: Chordata
- Class: Amphibia
- Order: Anura
- Family: Pelodryadidae
- Genus: Mahonabatrachus
- Species: M. meirianus

Binomial name
- Mahonabatrachus meirianus (Tyler, 1969)

Synonyms
- Hyla meiriana Tyler, 1969; Litoria meiriana (Tyler, 1969)

= Rockhole frog =

Species of amphibian

The rockhole frog (Mahonabatrachus meirianus) is a species of frog in the subfamily Pelodryadinae that is endemic to Australia. Its natural habitats are subtropical or tropical dry shrubland, rivers, freshwater marshes, rocky areas, and caves. They also live in small ponds.
