= Long-snouted frog =

Conservation status
- Least Concern (IUCN 3.1)

Scientific classification
- Kingdom: Animalia
- Phylum: Chordata
- Class: Amphibia
- Order: Anura
- Family: Pelodryadidae
- Genus: Mahonabatrachus
- Species: M. longirostris

Binomial name
- Mahonabatrachus longirostris (Tyler & Davies, 1977)

Synonyms
- Litoria longirostris Tyler & Davies, 1977

Species of amphibian

The long-snouted frog (Mahonabatrachus longirostris) is a species of frog in the family Pelodryadidae. It is endemic to Australia. The frog is also known as the long-nosed tree frog, scrub rocket frog, and sharp-snouted frog.

== Habitat ==
Its natural habitats in Australia are subtropical or tropical moist lowland forests, intermittent rivers, and intermittent freshwater marshes. It is threatened by habitat loss.

== Reproduction ==
The long-snouted frog attaches its eggs to tree trunks, rocks, or under leaves out of water.
