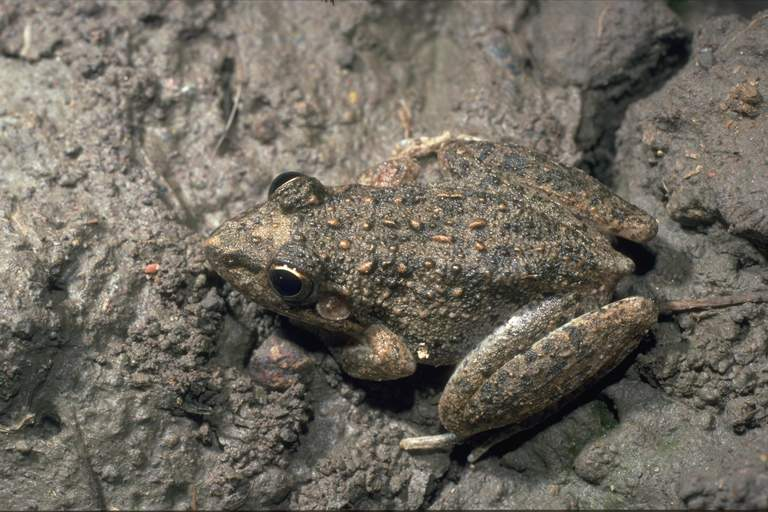

Conservation status
- Least Concern (IUCN 3.1)

Scientific classification
- Kingdom: Animalia
- Phylum: Chordata
- Class: Amphibia
- Order: Anura
- Family: Hylidae
- Genus: Litoria
- Species: L. inermis

Binomial name
- Litoria inermis (Peters, 1867)

= Bumpy rocket frog =

Species of amphibian

The bumpy rocket frog (Litoria inermis), also known as Peters' frog, is a species of frog in the subfamily Pelodryadinae. It is abundant and endemic to Australia, where it is found from northern Australia south to Maryborough, Queensland.

== Description ==
Adults are about 35 mm (1.4 inches), tadpoles about 42 mm (1.7 inches). They are brown or grey with many small warts and darker patches on their backs. Their toes are half to three-quarters webbed, and the fingers are not webbed.

=== Vocalizations ===
Similar to the striped rocket frog (L. nasuta), their calls are a few 'clucks', then a rapid series of 'weks' for some seconds, then a few more 'clucks'.

== Habitat ==
The natural habitats of the Bumpy rocket frog are subtropical or tropical swamps, dry savanna, subtropical or tropical dry lowland grassland, and intermittent freshwater marshes, especially around rain-filled pools.

== Reproduction ==
Their eggs are laid in clumps of about 96 to 330 brown eggs on temporary pool surfaces.
