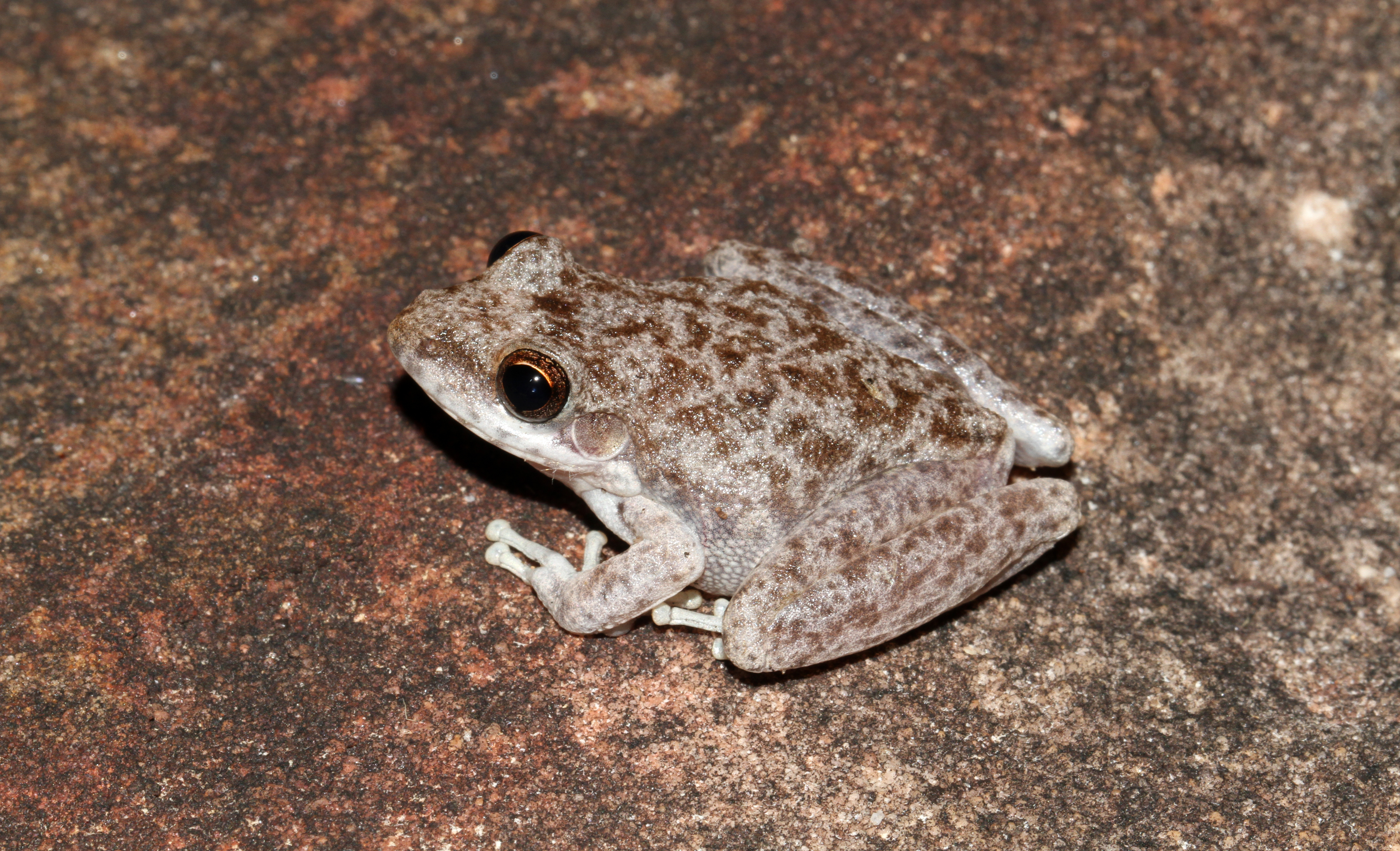

Conservation status
- Least Concern (IUCN 3.1)

Scientific classification
- Kingdom: Animalia
- Phylum: Chordata
- Class: Amphibia
- Order: Anura
- Family: Pelodryadidae
- Genus: Litoria
- Species: L. coplandi

Binomial name
- Litoria coplandi (Tyler, 1968)

= Copland's rock frog =

Species of amphibian

Copland's rock frog or the saxicoline tree frog (Litoria coplandi) is a species of frog in the subfamily Pelodryadinae. It is endemic to Australia, in a range extending from the Kimberley region of Western Australia to Arnhem Land and a record in the north of Queensland. Its natural habitats are subtropical or tropical dry shrubland, subtropical or tropical dry lowland grassland, intermittent rivers, and rocky areas.

The IUCN Red list gives the conservation status of least concern, and notes the population trend as stable.

The publication of the species, by Tyler in 1968, was based on his study of a type collection by Copland. The collection, 29 specimens at the Western Australian Museum, was reassigned as three syntypes; for this species, Litoria watjulumensis, and Litoria peronii. The holotype for L. coplandi was collected at Inverway Station in the Northern Territory.
