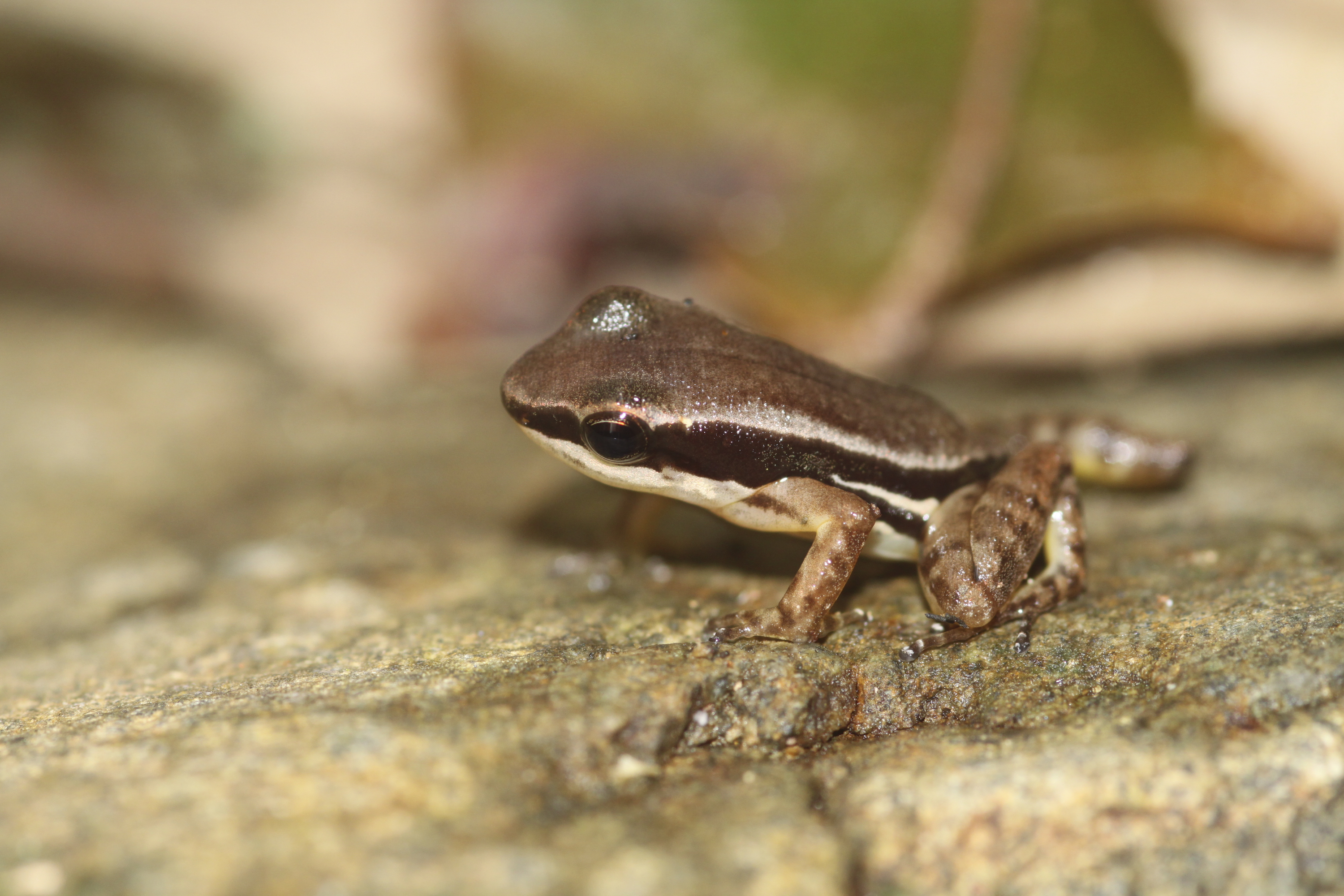

Conservation status
- Least Concern (IUCN 3.1)

Scientific classification
- Kingdom: Animalia
- Phylum: Chordata
- Class: Amphibia
- Order: Anura
- Family: Dendrobatidae
- Genus: Colostethus
- Species: C. pratti

Binomial name
- Colostethus pratti (Boulenger, 1899)

Synonyms
- Phyllobates Pratti Boulenger, 1899

= Colostethus pratti =

Species of frog

Colostethus pratti is a species of frog in the family Dendrobatidae. It is found in the northwestern Colombia (Antioquia, Chocó, Córdoba, and Risaralda Departments) and Panama, possibly also in southeastern Costa Rica. It is sometimes known as the Pratt's rocket frog. Colostethus pratti is named after Antwerp Edgar Pratt, an explorer who collected the type series.

== Description ==
Colostethus pratti is a small member of its genus; both males and females grow to about 24 mm (0.94 in) snout–vent length. It is brown above with characteristic dull paired dorsolateral stripes.

== Reproduction ==
Reproduction of Colostethus pratti has been observed in captivity. Males have a loud, peeping advertisement call. They appear to establish small territories and can be aggressive against each other, engaging in "wrestling" bouts. Amplexus has not been observed but is presumably cephalic as in related species. Egg clusters contain 8-20 eggs. They are deposited on top of leaves or within plastic hiding places, primarily during a simulated wet season. Eggs hatch in 1–2 weeks. After hatching, the female transports the tadpoles to a body of water, carrying them on her back, sometimes for several days. No further parental care is provided. Tadpoles metamorphose 8–13 weeks after hatching. Newly metamorphosed froglets are 6–8 mm (0.24–0.31 in) in length. Some males start calling as soon as six months post-metamorphosis.

== Habitat and conservation ==
Colostethus pratti is a common frog. Its natural habitats are humid lowland and montane forests where it occurs on the forest floor and along rocky sections of forest streams. Scientists observed it between 110 and 1600 meters above sea level.

The frog's known range includes several protected parks, including Los Katios National Park.

Agriculture, logging and pollution are threats to this species, although it is not considered threatened as a species due to its wide distribution and presumably large total population.
