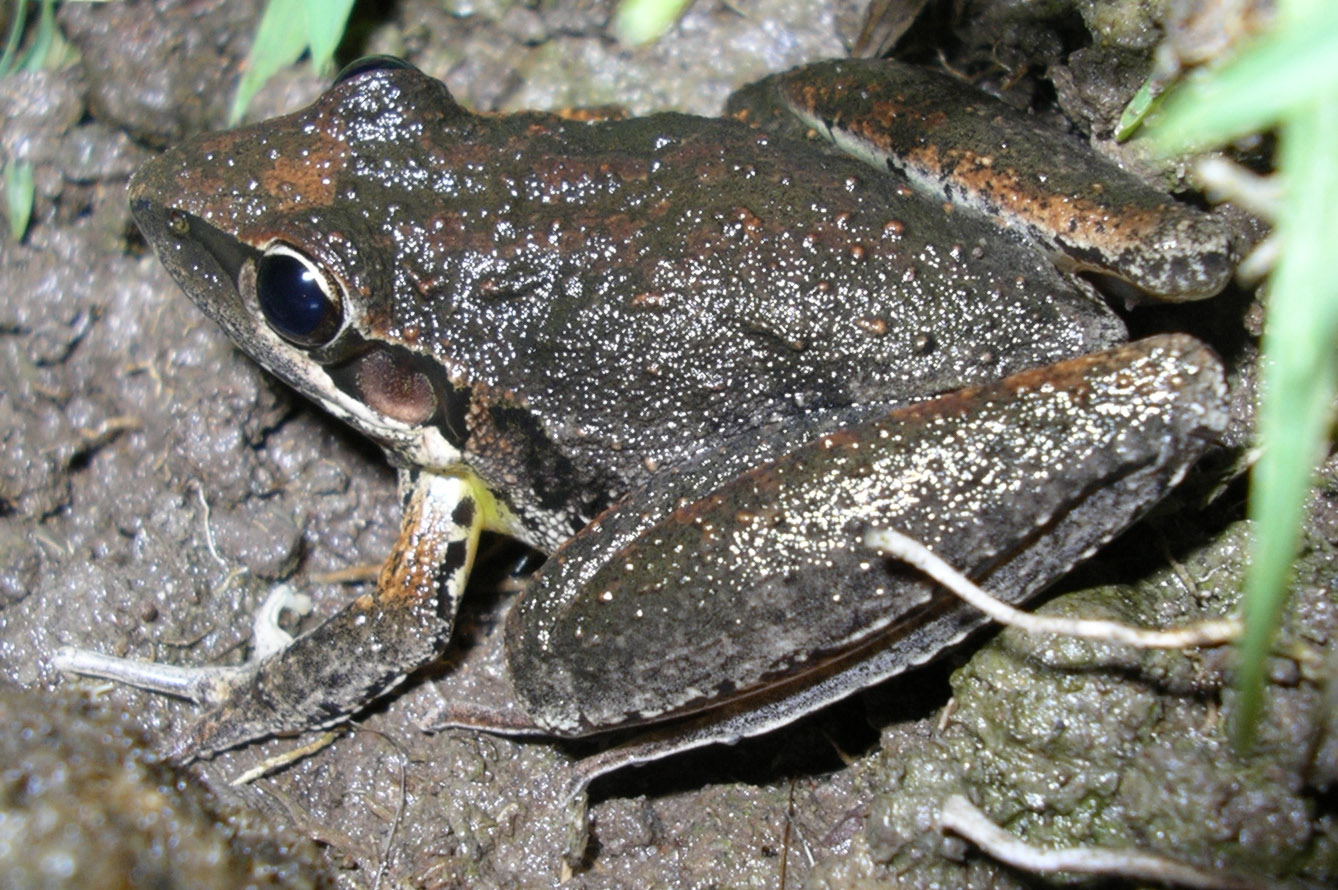

Conservation status
- Least Concern (IUCN 3.1)

Scientific classification
- Kingdom: Animalia
- Phylum: Chordata
- Class: Amphibia
- Order: Anura
- Family: Pelodryadidae
- Genus: Litoria
- Species: L. latopalmata

Binomial name
- Litoria latopalmata Gunther, 1867
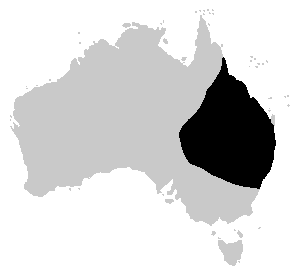
- Distribution of the broad-palmed frog

= Broad-palmed frog =

Species of amphibian

The broad-palmed frog (Litoria latopalmata) is a species of ground-dwelling tree frog. It is native to much of eastern Australia. They can be found from mid-Queensland to south of Sydney. It is associated with the coast and inland, and is distributed as far west in New South Wales to the South Australia border.

== Description ==
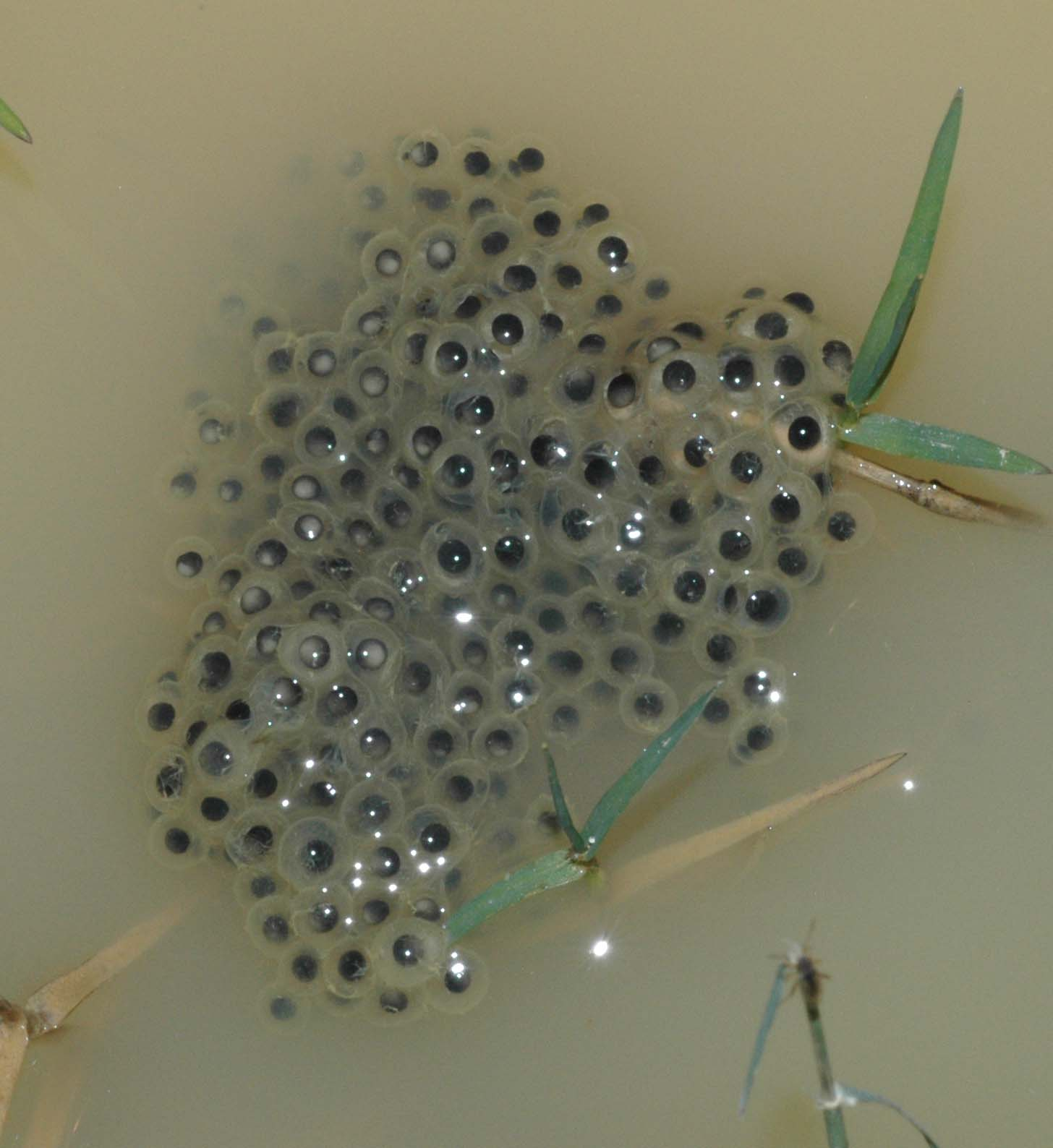
Litoria latopalmata spawn

The broad-palmed frog is pale to dark brown on its dorsal surface; it can have darker blotches or variegations. Its skin is smooth, with the occasional wart on its back. A black band runs from the snout, through the eye and tympanum, and breaks into blotches down the side. A white line breaks the black band in front of the eye, and runs under the eye. The thighs are marbled yellow and black and the armpit is yellow. The lower lip is normally marbled black and white. The belly is white.

== Ecology and behaviour ==
The broad-palmed frog will call in a large chorus during mating season, around a still water source, normally a dam, but may be a roadside ditch, temporary puddle or still area of a stream. The call is a short "quark" repeated continuously. This species of frog can be found great distances from the breeding area and tends to inhabit open country or forest.

Up to 350 eggs are laid in mass either floating or attached to vegetation. This egg mass will often sink once disturbed. Hatching occurs 3–6 days after laying, depending on temperature. Tadpoles are sandy gold and reach a maximum size of 49mm. The developmental period is short, as eggs are often laid in very temporary water. Metamorph frogs resemble the adult and measure from 14-17mm in length.

== Sources ==
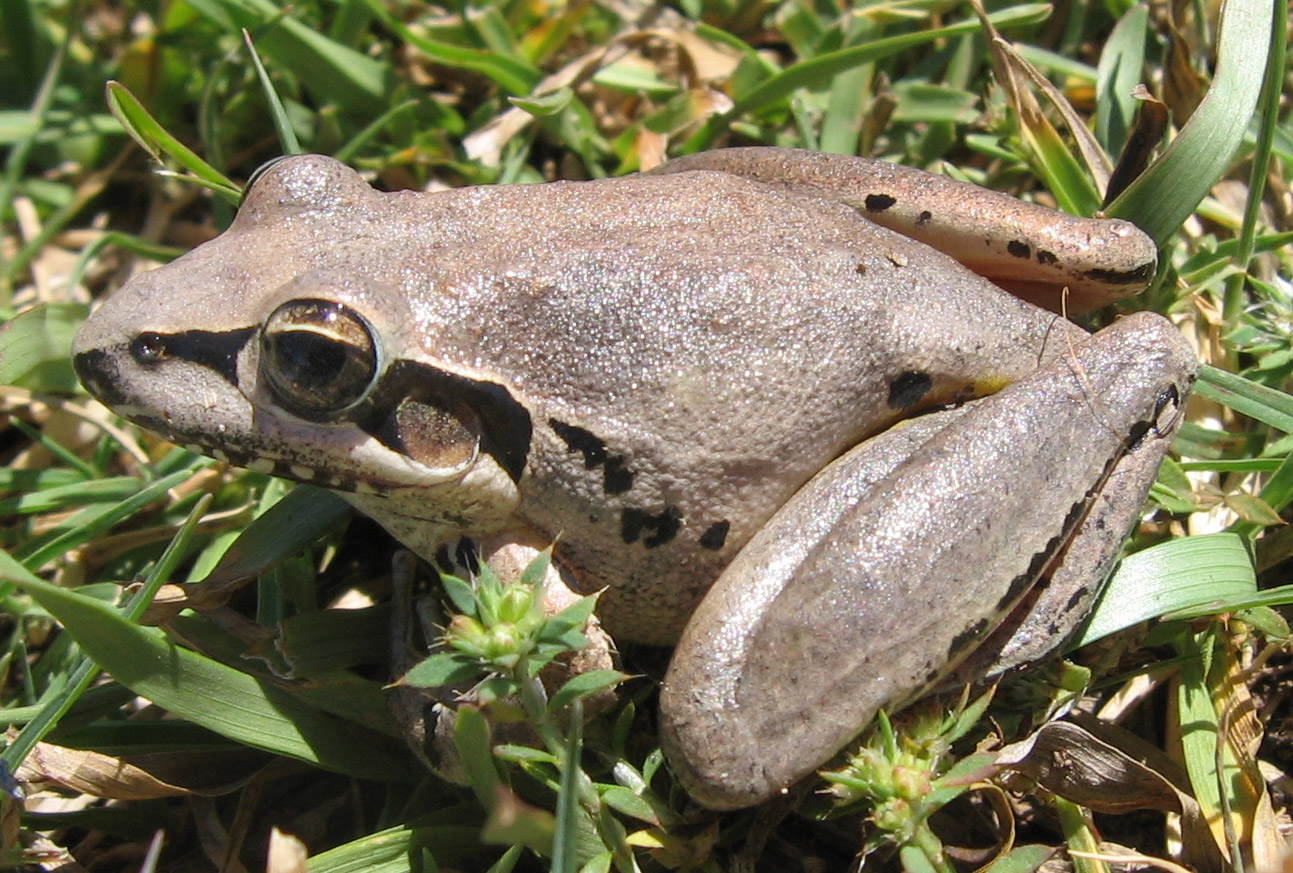
Pale coloured Broad Palmed Frog

- Anstis, M. 2002. Tadpoles of South-eastern Australia. Reed New Holland: Sydney
- Robinson, M. 2002. A Field Guide to Frogs of Australia. Australian Museum/Reed New Holland: Sydney
- Frogs Australia Network-frog call available here
