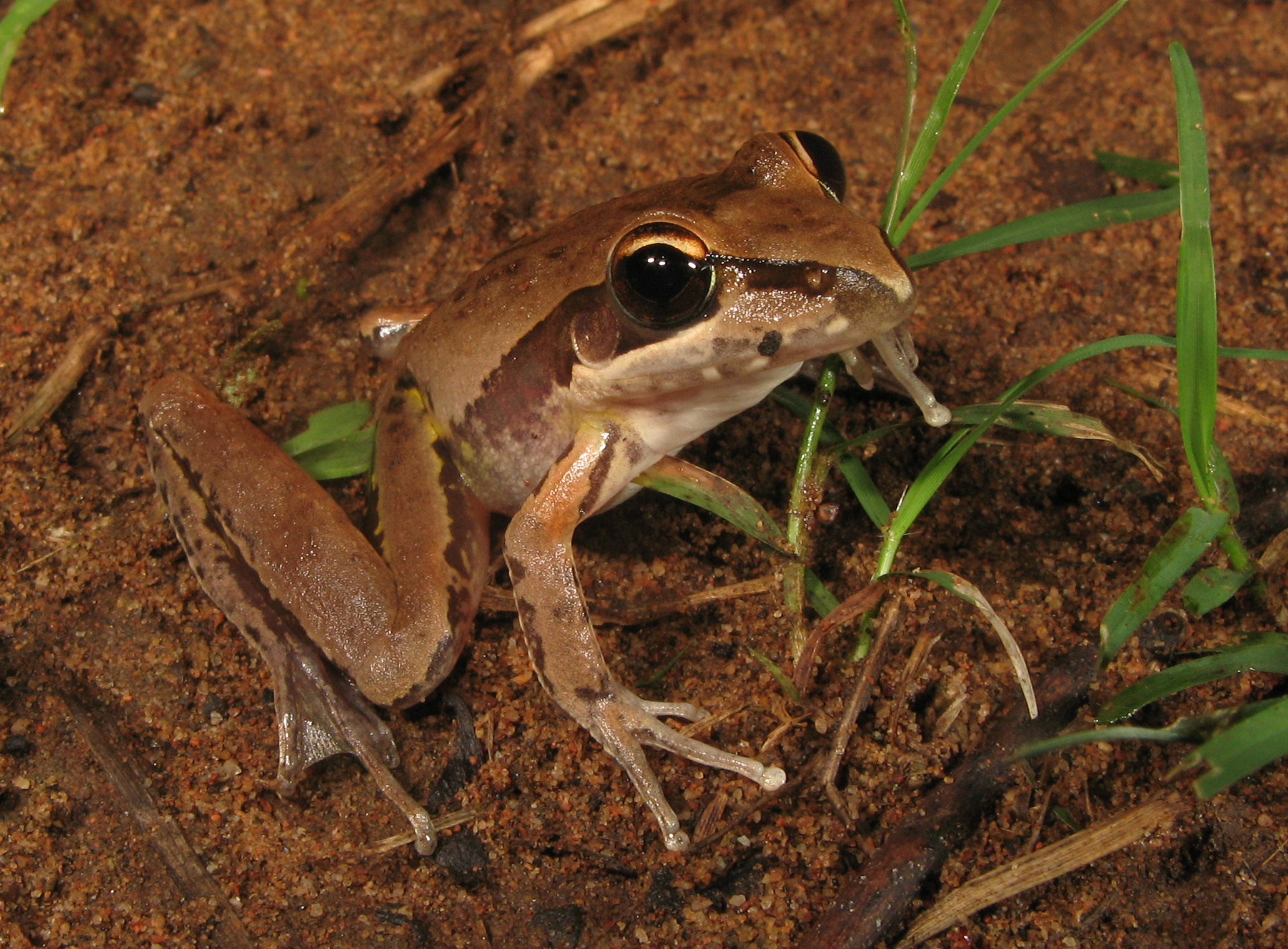

Conservation status
- Least Concern (IUCN 3.1)

Scientific classification
- Kingdom: Animalia
- Phylum: Chordata
- Class: Amphibia
- Order: Anura
- Family: Hylidae
- Genus: Litoria
- Species: L. watjulumensis

Binomial name
- Litoria watjulumensis (Copland, 1957)

Synonyms
- Hyla wotjulumensis Tyler 1968

= Watjulum frog =

Species of amphibian

The Wotjulum frog (Litoria watjulumensis) is a species of frog in the subfamily Pelodryadinae. Its habitats are subtropical or tropical dry forests, subtropical or tropical moist lowland forests, subtropical or tropical swamps, rivers, intermittent rivers, swamps, freshwater lakes, freshwater marshes, intermittent freshwater marshes, and rocky areas.

Litoria watjulumensis was named for Watjulum Mission in the north of Western Australia, sometimes spelled 'wotjulum'. This has led to variants in the common names and the specific epithet, repeating the spelling of Tyler's publication as Hyla wotjulumensis. The common names include Watjulum or Wotjulum frog, Watjulum Mission tree frog, and giant or large rocket frog.

The publication of the species was based on a type collection by Copland. The collection, of 29 specimens at the Western Australian Museum, was reassigned as three syntypes; for this species, Litoria coplandi, and Litoria peronii. The type for Litoria watjulumensis was collected near Watjulum mission "close to Yampi Sound, north of King Sound".
