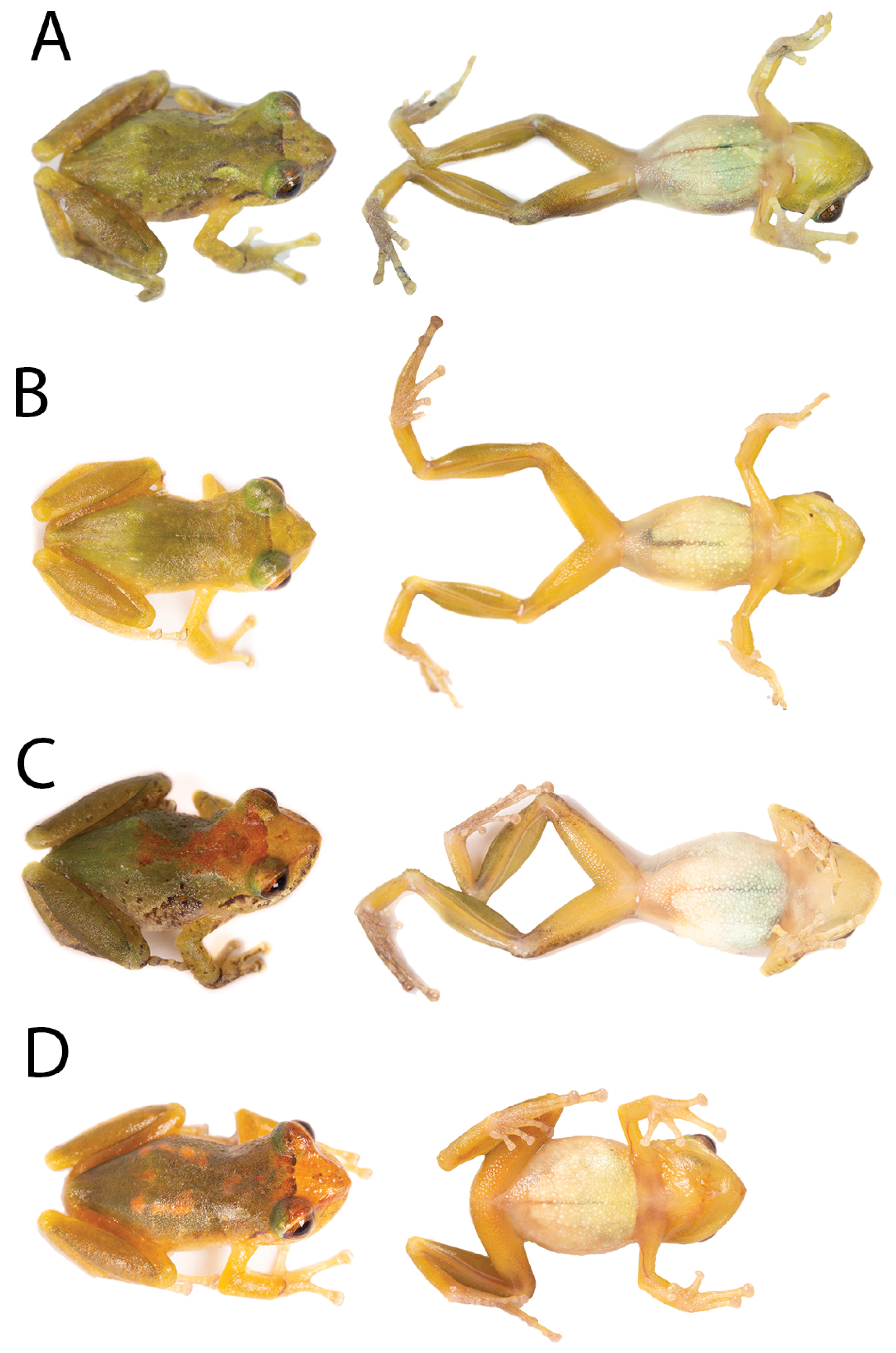

Conservation status
- Near Threatened (IUCN 3.1)

Scientific classification
- Kingdom: Animalia
- Phylum: Chordata
- Class: Amphibia
- Order: Anura
- Clade: Brachycephaloidea
- Family: Craugastoridae
- Genus: Pristimantis
- Species: P. petersi

Binomial name
- Pristimantis petersi (Lynch, 1991)

Synonyms
- Eleutherodactylus petersorum Lynch, 1991

= Pristimantis petersi =

Species of amphibian

Pristimantis petersi, also known as Peters's robber frog, is a species of frog in the family Strabomantidae. It is found in Colombia and Ecuador. Its natural habitat is subtropical or tropical moist montane forests. It is threatened by habitat loss.
