= Pinocchio frog =

Scientific classification
- Kingdom: Animalia
- Phylum: Chordata
- Class: Amphibia
- Order: Anura
- Family: Pelodryadidae
- Genus: Nasutibatrachus
- Species: N. pinocchio

Binomial name
- Nasutibatrachus pinocchio (Oliver, Günther, Mumpuni, and Richards, 2019)

Synonyms
- Litoria pinocchio Oliver, Günther, Mumpuni, Richards, 2019

Species of amphibian

The Pinocchio frog or northern Pinocchio treefrog (Nasutibatrachus pinocchio) is a species of frog in the family Pelodryadidae. It was discovered in the Foja Mountains of Papua Province in Indonesia by Conservation International and the National Geographic Society during a 2008 expedition, where it was accidentally spotted by Paul Oliver, a herpetologist. Despite being discovered in 2008, it remained undescribed and was long known simply as the "Pinocchio frog" (with no given scientific name) until 2019, when it was finally described as Litoria pinocchio. The frog is named for its Pinocchio-like nose, which can enlarge and inflate in certain situations. Although unusual, a similar nose is found in several other related frogs from New Guinea, including Exochohyla chrisdahli, Teretistes havina, N. mareku, N. mucro, N. pronimius and Exochohyla prora.

== Ecology and behavior ==
The Pinocchio frog's diet consists primarily of insects. They are also found high above ground, according to Paul Oliver. He believes this because when he spotted the frog, he did not see any more so he supposed they were up in the trees. The male Pinocchio frog inflates its nose when calling, and the nose decreases in size when the frog is calm and quiet.
