= Montane Pinocchio frog =

Scientific classification
- Kingdom: Animalia
- Phylum: Chordata
- Class: Amphibia
- Order: Anura
- Family: Pelodryadidae
- Genus: Nasutibatrachus
- Species: N. vivissimia

Binomial name
- Nasutibatrachus vivissimia (Oliver, Richards, and Donnellan, 2019)

Synonyms
- Litoria vivissimia Oliver, Richards, and Donnellan, 2019

Species of frog

The montane Pinocchio frog (Nasutibatrachus vivissimia) is a species of frog in the family Pelodryadidae. It is endemic to New Guinea. Scientists saw it on Hides Ridge in the karstic area of the Southern Fold Mountains in Papua New Guinea. Like the Pinocchio frog, it has a protuberance on its snout that can grow or shrink.

According to one of the lead scientists, Dr. Paul Oliver, senior curator of the Queensland Museum, “... vivissimia translates to ‘cheeky monkey’ – we have probably walked past dozens of them but have only ever seen one. We think they are probably up there in treetops laughing at us." The "Pinocchio" refers to the children's book character whose nose would grow whenever he told a lie.

The male adult frog is about 2.9 cm long. It is light yellow-brown in color with light green patches and more yellow on its legs. It has a spike on its nose, and all of its toes are webbed.

As of 2019, scientists had only seen Nasutibatrachus vivissimia once, in the Central Cordillera. The scientists used DNA barcoding to examine Nasutibatrachus vivissimia and its relatives, the parachuting frog and the Pinocchio frog.
