= Nasutibatrachus =

Scientific classification
- Kingdom: Animalia
- Phylum: Chordata
- Class: Amphibia
- Order: Anura
- Family: Pelodryadidae
- Genus: Nasutibatrachus; Richards, Mahony, and Donnellan, 2025

Species
- Nasutibatrachus mareku (Günther, 2008); Nasutibatrachus mucro (Menzies, 1993); Nasutibatrachus pinocchio (Oliver, Günther, Mumpuni, and Richards, 2019); Nasutibatrachus pronimius (Menzies, 1993); Nasutibatrachus vivissimia (Oliver, Richards, and Donnellan, 2019)

Genus of amphibians

Nasutibatrachus is a genus of tree frogs in the family Pelodryadidae, native to the forests of New Guinea. Species in the genus were previously included within the wastebasket genus Litoria, but were separated into a new genus in 2025. They are small frogs with highly camouflaged skin, mottled many potenitial colours. Males have a very distinctive spike on their nose, that differentiates them from all other Pelodryadidae except Exochohyla (for which both sexes have a spike) and Teretistes. The eggs and tadpoles of this genus have never been observed, but the males call from foliage near forest ponds, so it is assumed they breed in these ponds.

The genus is named from the Greek nasus meaning "nose" and batrachus meaning frog.
