= Kallistobatrachus lisae =

Scientific classification
- Kingdom: Animalia
- Phylum: Chordata
- Class: Amphibia
- Order: Anura
- Family: Pelodryadidae
- Genus: Kallistobatrachus
- Species: K. lisae

Binomial name
- Kallistobatrachus lisae (Richards, Donnellan & Oliver, 2023)

Synonyms
- Litoria lisae Richards, Donnellan & Oliver, 2023

Species of frog

Kallistobatrachus lisae, also known as Lisa's tree frog, is a species of frog in the subfamily Pelodryadinae. It was described in 2023 by Australian herpetologist Stephen Richards and his colleagues Stephen Donnellan and Paul Oliver. Both the common name and the specific epithet lisae refer to Stephen Richards' wife.

== Distribution and habitat ==
The species is endemic to New Guinea. It is known only from sinkholes in karst habitat, in the lower forests of the Kikori River basin, in southern Papua New Guinea.
