= Kallistobatrachus haematogaster =

Scientific classification
- Kingdom: Animalia
- Phylum: Chordata
- Class: Amphibia
- Order: Anura
- Family: Pelodryadidae
- Genus: Kallistobatrachus
- Species: K. haematogaster

Binomial name
- Kallistobatrachus haematogaster (Richards, Donnellan & Oliver, 2023)

Synonyms
- Richards, Donnellan & Oliver, 2023

Species of frog

Kallistobatrachus haematogaster, also known as the red-bellied tree frog, is a species of frog in the family Pelodryadidae. It was described in 2023 by Australian herpetologist Stephen Richards and his colleagues Stephen Donnellan and Paul Oliver. The specific epithet haematogaster comes from the Greek haema (‘blood’) and gaster (‘belly’), with reference to the frog's bright red abdomen.

== Distribution and habitat ==
The species is endemic to New Guinea and is known only from the Darai Plateau in the Gulf Province of Papua New Guinea.
