= Hyalotos naispela =

Scientific classification
- Kingdom: Animalia
- Phylum: Chordata
- Class: Amphibia
- Order: Anura
- Family: Pelodryadidae
- Genus: Hyalotos
- Species: H. naispela

Binomial name
- Hyalotos naispela (Richards, Donnellan & Oliver, 2023)

Synonyms
- Litoria naispela Richards, Donnellan & Oliver, 2023

Species of frog

Hyalotos naispela, also known as the Crater Mountain treehole frog, is a species of frog in the family Pelodryadidae. It was described in 2023 by Australian herpetologist Stephen Richards and his colleagues Stephen Donnellan and Paul Oliver. The specific epithet naispela is a Tok Pisin term meaning ‘beautiful’ or ‘attractive’.

== Distribution and habitat ==
The species is endemic to New Guinea. It is found in the Crater Mountain wildlife management area of Papua New Guinea.

== Behaviour ==
When breeding, the frogs glue their eggs to the trunks of trees above water-filled tree hollows, with the tadpoles being washed into the hollows after hatching. When the immature froglets first emerge from the tree hollows, their appearance resembles that of bird droppings, a factor hypothesised to protect them from bird predation, before they acquire the green and white markings of adult frogs.
