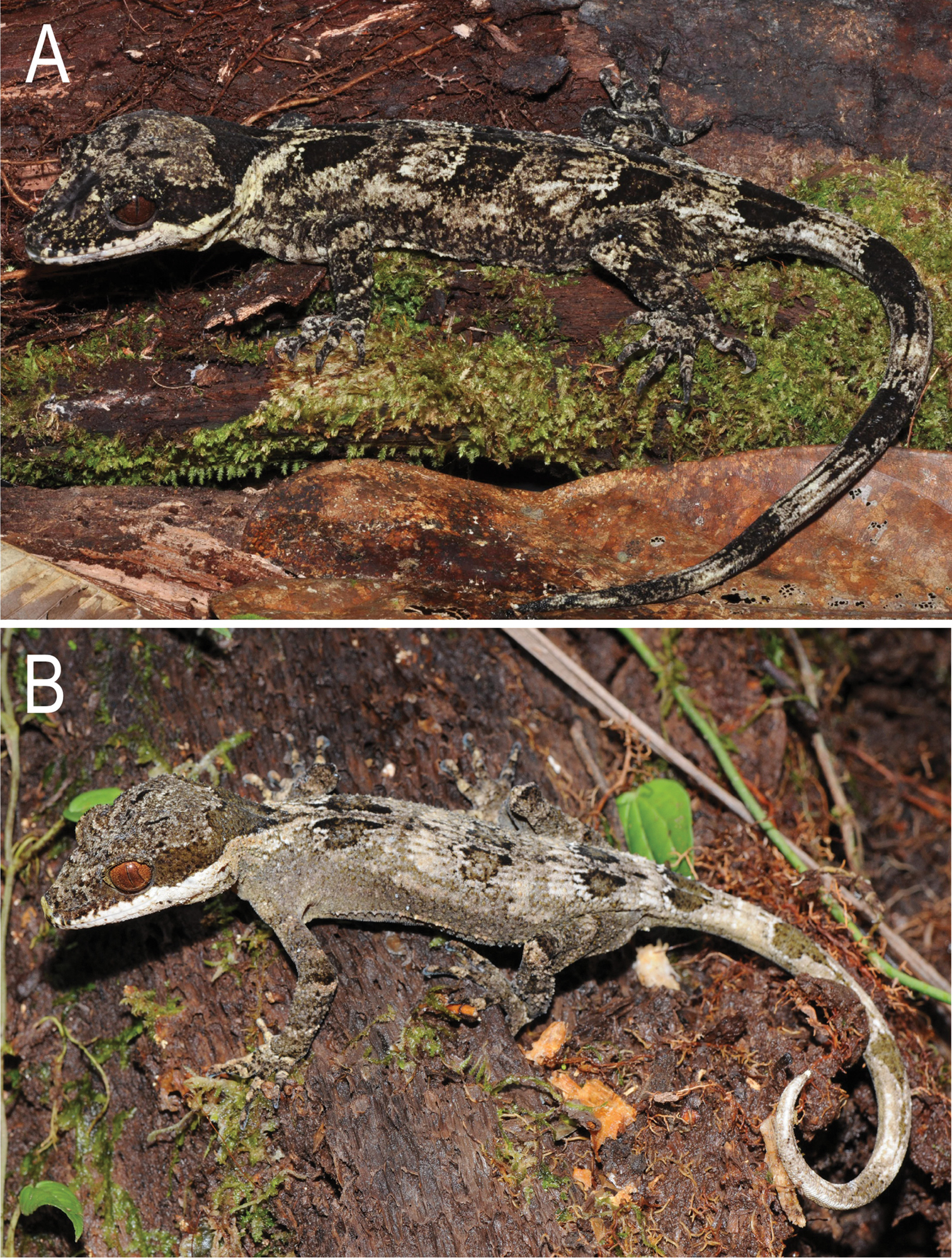
- female (above) and juvenile (below)

Scientific classification
- Kingdom: Animalia
- Phylum: Chordata
- Class: Reptilia
- Order: Squamata
- Suborder: Gekkota
- Family: Gekkonidae
- Genus: Cyrtodactylus
- Species: C. rex

Binomial name
- Cyrtodactylus rex Oliver, Richards, Mumpuni, & Rosler, 2016

= Cyrtodactylus rex =

Species of lizard

Cyrtodactylus rex is a species of gecko that is endemic to Papua New Guinea.
