= Sandyrana lubisi =

Scientific classification
- Kingdom: Animalia
- Phylum: Chordata
- Class: Amphibia
- Order: Anura
- Family: Pelodryadidae
- Genus: Sandyrana
- Species: S. lubisi

Binomial name
- Sandyrana lubisi (Oliver, Günther, Tjaturadi, and Richards, 2021)

Synonyms
- Litoria lubisi Oliver, Günther, Tjaturadi, and Richards, 2021; Nyctimystes lubisi

Species of frog

Sandyrana lubisi, or Lubis's tree frog, is a frog endemic to Indonesia. Scientists know it exclusively from its type locality in Papua Province.
