= Amnihyla amnicola =

Scientific classification
- Kingdom: Animalia
- Phylum: Chordata
- Class: Amphibia
- Order: Anura
- Family: Pelodryadidae
- Genus: Amnihyla
- Species: A. amnicola

Binomial name
- Amnihyla amnicola (Richards, Tjaturadi, Krey, and Donnellan, 2021)

Synonyms
- Litoria amnicola Richards, Tjaturadi, Krey, and Donnellan, 2021

Species of frog

Amnihyla amnicola, the Raja Ampat torrent tree frog, is a frog in the family Hylidae, endemic to Indonesia. It has been found on Salawati Island, which is in the Raja Ampat archipelago.

== Original description ==
- Richards SJ; B Tjaturadi; K Krey; SC Donnellan (2021). Telnov, D; MVL Barclay; OSG Pauwels (eds.). "A new stream-dwelling frog of the genus Litoria Tschudi, 1838 (Anura: Pelodryadidae) from Salawati Island, Indonesia". Biodiversity, Biogeography and Nature Conservation in Wallacea and New Guinea. 4. Entomological Society of Latvia: 19–33.
