= Antwerp Edgar Pratt =

English naturalist (1862–1920)

Antwerp Edgar Pratt FRGS
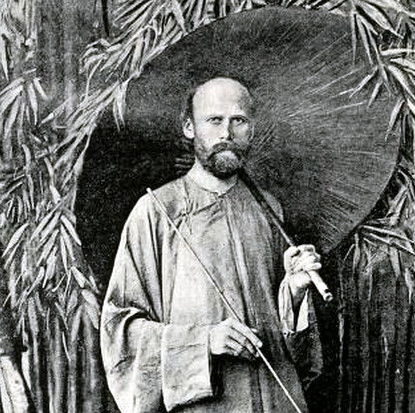
- Born: 6 March 1852; Isle of Wight
- Died: 4 January 1924 (aged 71); Kingston-upon-Thames, Surrey

Antwerp Edgar Pratt FRGS (6 March 1852 - 4 January 1924) was a Victorian naturalist, explorer, author, and renowned collector of plants, insects, and other animals. Species named for Pratt include three mammals and two reptiles. Two of his sons and a nephew were also collectors.

== Biography ==
Pratt was born on 6 March 1852 on the Isle of Wight in England to Charles, a grocer, and Ann Pratt. He had two elder siblings, Florence and Vienna.

He married Alice Mary Spanner in 1882 and they had six children, four sons and two daughters. Felix Pratt and Charles Pratt followed their father and became successful insect collectors. His other sons Henry and Joseph also made important contributions to science.

He was a member of the Royal Geographical Society and in 1891 he received the Gill Memorial Award for the encouragement of geographical research in early career researchers who have shown great potential. In the same year he visited Tibet and China. In China his activities were treated with suspicion and notices were posted warning locals of assisting him. He made some progress by employing Chinese Christians. These employees were harassed by the locals and his German assistant had to retreat from his work. Whilst he was in Tatsienlu in China he met and was assisted by the French missionaries and naturalists Bishop Felix Biet and Father Jean André Soulié.

In 1892 he published an account of his journey "to the snows of Tibet through China". This book is thought to show that Pratt did not actually get to Tibet but only got close enough to meet the missionaries who had been ejected from the country. Incidentally Pratt's book is thought to be a source for the work of Vladimir Nabokov.

He died in 1924 in Kingston upon Thames, Surrey, aged 71.

== Expeditions ==
In the course of thirty years of almost continuous journeyings in both hemispheres, it has been my fortune to stray far from the beaten tracks and to know something of the spell and mystery of the earth’s solitudes. My work in quest of additions to the great natural history collections, both public and private, of England, and to a less extent of France, has led me to the Rocky Mountains, the Amazons, the Republic of Columbia, the Yangtze gorges and the snows of Tibet. It is safe to say that none of these has aroused my interest and curiosity in so great a degree as the scene of my latest and my next expedition, the still almost unexplored Papua, second largest of the world’s islands and almost the last to guard its secrets from the geographer, the naturalist and the anthropologist.

A.E. Pratt, 1906. Introduction to Two Years among New Guinea Cannibals.

== Benefactors ==
Antwerp Edgar Pratt and his sons travelled and collected specimens on behalf of a number of prominent people including the English entomologists John Henry Leech, Sir George Hamilton Kenrick and James John Joicey as well as Walter Rothschild, 2nd Baron Rothschild.

== Collections ==
Birmingham Museums Trust holds substantial natural history collections gathered by A. E. Pratt and his sons.

== Species named after Pratt ==
- Pratt's roundleaf bat Hipposiderous pratti, 1891
- Pratt's vole (Alt. the Sichuan Red-backed Vole) Eothenomys chinensis, 1891
- Pratt's crabapple Malus prattii 1895
- Pratt's snail eater Dipsas pratti, 1897
- Pratt's rocket frog Colostethus pratti, 1899
- Sphenomorphus pratti, 1903
- Pratt's tree frog Litoria pratti, 1911
- Green acouchi Myoprocta pratti, 1913
- Ceram bandicoot Rhynchomeles prattorum, 1920 (Named for his sons)
- Buru opalescent birdwing butterfly Troides prattorum, 1922
- Delias pratti, 1922

== Publications ==
- Pratt, A.E. (1892). To the Snows of Tibet through China. London: Longmans.
- Pratt, A.E. (1906). Two Years among New Guinea Cannibals, a Naturalists Sojourn among the Aborigines of Unexplored New Guinea. London: Seeley & Co.
