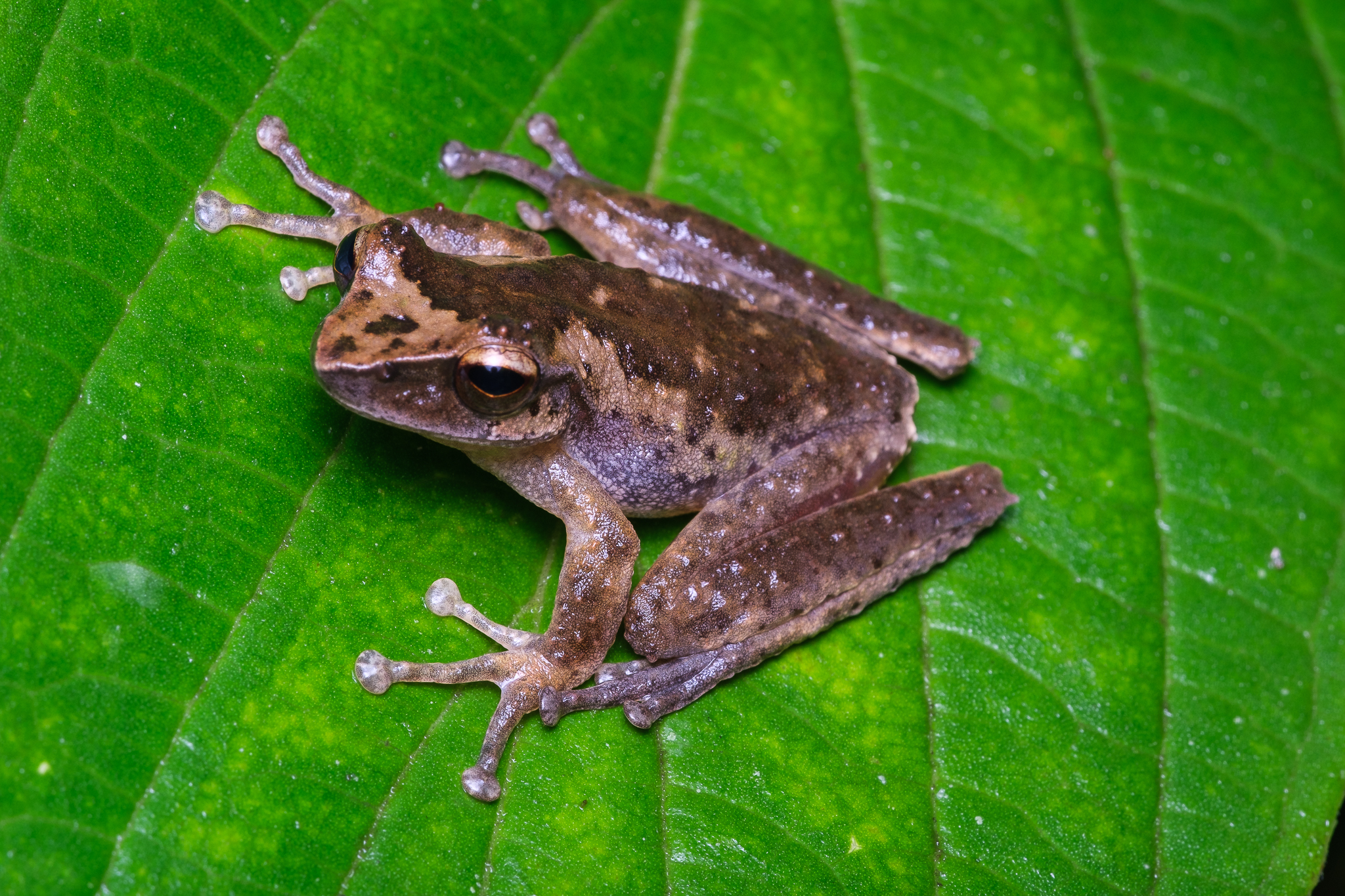
- Arfakiana tree frog (Amnihyla arfakiana) in Manokwari Regency, Indonesia

Scientific classification
- Kingdom: Animalia
- Phylum: Chordata
- Class: Amphibia
- Order: Anura
- Family: Pelodryadidae
- Genus: Amnihyla; Richards, Mahony, and Donnellan, 2025

Species
- See text

= Amnihyla =

Genus of amphibians

Amnihyla is a genus of tree frogs in the family Pelodryadidae, native to New Guinea and its surrounding islands.

Species of this genus inhabit most natural habitats in New Guinea from the lowland forests to montane grasslands. The frogs are mostly arboreal or semi-aquatic and breed in streams and torrents.

== Species ==
Many of the species in this genus were part of the wastebasket genus Litoria until it was split into multiple genera after a comprehensive phylogenetic study in 2025:

- Amnihyla amnicola (Richards, Tjaturadi, Krey, and Donnellan, 2021)
- Amnihyla angiana (Boulenger, 1915) - Angiana tree frog
- Amnihyla arfakiana (Peters and Doria, 1878) - Arfakiana tree frog
- Amnihyla becki (Loveridge, 1945) - Beck's tree frog
- Amnihyla brongersmai (Loveridge, 1945)
- Amnihyla bulmeri (Tyler, 1968) - Bulmer's tree frog
- Amnihyla dorsivena (Tyler, 1968) - Eastern mountains tree frog
- Amnihyla fuscula (Oliver and Richards, 2007)
- Amnihyla grinpela (Richards and Oliver, 2024)
- Amnihyla hastula (Oliver, Iskandar, and Richards, 2023)
- Amnihyla kikori (Richards and Oliver, 2024)
- Amnihyla lakekamu (Richards and Bickford, 2023)
- Amnihyla leucova (Tyler, 1968) - West Sepik tree frog
- Amnihyla longicrus (Boulenger, 1911) - Wendessi tree frog
- Amnihyla macki (Richards, 2001)
- Amnihyla megalops (Richards and Iskandar, 2006)
- Amnihyla micromembrana (Tyler, 1963) - Nodugl tree frog
- Amnihyla modica (Tyler, 1968) - Oruge tree frog
- Amnihyla napaea (Tyler, 1968) - Snow Mountains tree frog
- Amnihyla oenicolen (Menzies and Zweifel, 1974) - Trauna River tree frog
- Amnihyla pratti (Boulenger, 1911)
- Amnihyla rara (Günther and Richards, 2005)
- Amnihyla rivicola (Günther and Richards, 2005)
- Amnihyla scabra (Günther and Richards, 2005)
- Amnihyla skeliphros (Oliver, McDonald, Dahl, Nagombi, and Richards, 2024)
- Amnihyla spartacus (Richards and Oliver, 2006)
- Amnihyla spinifera (Tyler, 1968)
- Amnihyla stellarum (Richards, Johnston, and Oliver, 2025)
- Amnihyla wollastoni (Boulenger, 1914) - Highland tree frog
