= Cyrtodactylus hutchinsoni =

Scientific classification
- Kingdom: Animalia
- Phylum: Chordata
- Class: Reptilia
- Order: Squamata
- Suborder: Gekkota
- Family: Gekkonidae
- Genus: Cyrtodactylus
- Species: C. hutchinsoni

Binomial name
- Cyrtodactylus hutchinsoni Oliver, Karkkainen, & Richards, 2022

Gecko endemic to Vietnam

Cyrtodactylus hutchinsoni is a species of gecko that is endemic to Papua New Guinea.
