= Cyrtodactylus manos =

Scientific classification
- Kingdom: Animalia
- Phylum: Chordata
- Class: Reptilia
- Order: Squamata
- Suborder: Gekkota
- Family: Gekkonidae
- Genus: Cyrtodactylus
- Species: C. manos

Binomial name
- Cyrtodactylus manos Oliver, Karkkainen, Rosler, & Richards, 2019

Species of lizard

Cyrtodactylus manos, the yellow-snouted bent-toed gecko, is a species of gecko endemic to Papua New Guinea .
