= Azure-thighed tree frog =

Scientific classification
- Kingdom: Animalia
- Phylum: Chordata
- Class: Amphibia
- Order: Anura
- Family: Pelodryadidae
- Genus: Sandyrana
- Species: S. azuroscelis

Binomial name
- Sandyrana azuroscelis (Günther, Richards, Hamidy, Trilaksono, Sulaeman, Oliver, 2023)

Synonyms
- Litoria azuroscelis Günther, Richards, Hamidy, Trilaksono, Sulaeman, Oliver, 2023

Species of frog

The azure-thighed tree frog (Sandyrana azuroscelis), azure-thighed treefrog or, in Indonesian, katak-pohon paha-biru, is a species of tree frog in the family Pelodryadidae that is native to Western New Guinea. It was described by a group of Australian herpetologists in 2023.

== Description ==
The frog was named for the purple-blue colouration on the hidden portion of its hindlegs. The species is mostly dark green, with reddish-brown irises, and a mostly clear nictitating membrane, besides the darker dorsal margin. Adult males reach an estimated size of or under 66.6 mm (2.62 in). It differs from other members of the genus by the extent of hand webbing, as well as the size, shape, and colouration of the male's nuptial pad.

It has a distinctive call, described as a "tonk... – tonk... – tonk..." sound. It occurs in "a series of 2–7 calls", with a "repetition rate of 2.02 calls/s".

== Discovery ==
The azure-thighed tree frog was discovered in early August 2023 when six Australian herpetologists visited the region in search of "relatively rarely collected and remain poorly known" tree frogs. Its discovery was a result of them hearing its distinctive call, 30 ft (9.14 m) above them in trees near "a waterfall on a mountain stream". Two specimens were collected, and many more were heard in the same area. DNA analysis was not taken after the species discovery, but likely will in the future.

== Distribution ==
The azure-thighed tree frog is native to the tropical rainforests of the Wondiwoi Mountains of the Wandammen Peninsula in northwestern Indonesian New Guinea, or Western New Guinea, although its range may extend into other locations. More information is needed to further analyze the species range extent.
