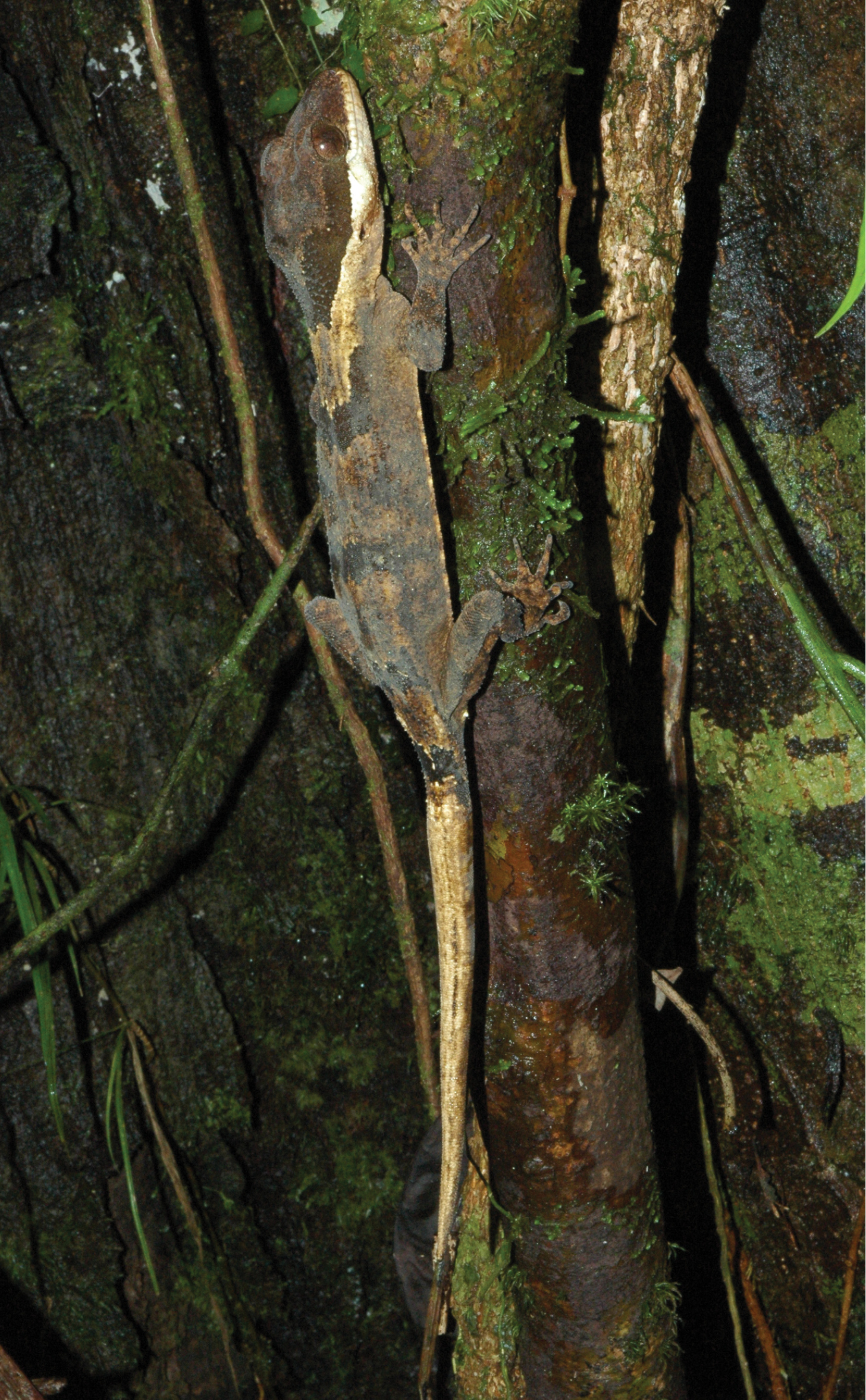

Scientific classification
- Kingdom: Animalia
- Phylum: Chordata
- Class: Reptilia
- Order: Squamata
- Suborder: Gekkota
- Family: Gekkonidae
- Genus: Cyrtodactylus
- Species: C. equestris

Binomial name
- Cyrtodactylus equestris Oliver, Richards, Mumpuni, & Rosler, 2016

= Cyrtodactylus equestris =

Species of lizard

Cyrtodactylus equestris is a species of gecko that is endemic to Papua New Guinea.
