= Kallistobatrachus =

Scientific classification
- Kingdom: Animalia
- Phylum: Chordata
- Class: Amphibia
- Order: Anura
- Family: Pelodryadidae
- Genus: Kallistobatrachus; Richards, Mahony, and Donnellan, 2025

Species
- See text

Genus of amphibians

Kallistobatrachus is a genus of tree frogs in the family Pelodryadidae, native to New Guinea.

Species of this genus inhabit from lowland to montane forests, and are associated with ponds. Some have been observed to lay eggs on leaves above the ponds so the tadpoles fall into the pond upon hatching, and it is assumed to be a common behaviour amongst the genus (though has not been observed in all species).

The name of the genus is derived from the Greek kallistos meaning very beautiful and batrachus meaning frog.

== Species ==
Many of the species in this genus were part of the wastebasket genus Litoria until it was split into multiple genera after a comprehensive phylogenetic study in 2025. As the original Greek for Litoria is considered feminine and Kallistobatrachus masculine, the transition to the new genus changed L. chloronata to K. chloronatus:

- Kallistobatrachus aplini (Richards and Donnellan, 2020)
- Kallistobatrachus beryllinus (Richards and Donnellan, 2023)
- Kallistobatrachus chloronotus (Boulenger, 1911)
- Kallistobatrachus haematogaster (Richards, Donnellan, and Oliver, 2023)
- Kallistobatrachus iris (Tyler, 1962)
- Kallistobatrachus lisae (Richards, Donnellan, and Oliver, 2023)
- Kallistobatrachus majikthise (Johnston and Richards, 1994)
- Kallistobatrachus ollauro (Menzies, 1993)
