= Kallistobatrachus aplini =

Scientific classification
- Kingdom: Animalia
- Phylum: Chordata
- Class: Amphibia
- Order: Anura
- Family: Pelodryadidae
- Genus: Kallistobatrachus
- Species: K. aplini

Binomial name
- Kallistobatrachus aplini (Richards and Donnellan, 2020)

Synonyms
- Litoria aplini Richards and Donnellan, 2020

Species of amphibian

Kallistobatrachus aplini, or Aplin's tree frog, is a species of frog in the family Hylidae endemic to Papua New Guinea. Scientists know it exclusively from the type locality: the upper reaches of the Sepik River in Sandaun Province.

The adult frog measures 30–35 mm in snout-vent length. The skin of the dorsum can be green to brown in color, which may change over the course of the day and night. The belly and inner legs are yellow in color. Parts of the hind legs are blue and brown in color. The iris of the eye is gray in color with dark brown marks and a blue ring.

The male frogs have been observed calling from perches 5 m over pools of water.

The scientists named this frog after their friend and fellow herpetologist Ken Aplin. Dr. Aplin studied the animals of New Guinea.

== Original publication ==
- Richards, S.J.; S.C. Donnellan (2020). J. Louys; S. O'Connor; K. M. Helgen (eds.). "Litoria aplini sp. nov., a new species of treefrog (Pelodryadidae) from Papua New Guinea". Papers in Honour of Ken Aplin. Records of the Australian Museum (Abstract). 5 (72): 325–337. doi:10.3853/j.2201-4349.72.2020.1729.
