= Amnihyla spartacus =

Conservation status
- Data Deficient (IUCN 3.1)

Scientific classification
- Kingdom: Animalia
- Phylum: Chordata
- Class: Amphibia
- Order: Anura
- Family: Pelodryadidae
- Genus: Amnihyla
- Species: A. spartacus

Binomial name
- Amnihyla spartacus Richards and Oliver, 2006

Synonyms
- Litoria spartacus (Richards and Oliver, 2006)

Species of amphibian

Amnihyla spartacus is a species of frog in the subfamily Pelodryadinae of the family Hylidae. It is endemic to Papua New Guinea and is only known from two localities within the Kikori Integrate Conservation and Development Project Area in the Southern Highlands Province. It has affinities to Amnihyla macki and Amnihyla spinifera but has a smaller size and more extensively webbed hands and less tuberculate body.

== Description ==
Adult males measure 36–38 mm (1.4–1.5 in) and adult females—based on a single specimen—about 51 mm (2.0 in) in snout–vent length. The body of the males is moderately slender and the limbs are long; the head is winder than the body. The snout is rounded. The eyes are large and prominent. The tympanum is small but distinct. The fingers and the toes are long, partially webbed, and with prominent discs. The dorsum has yellowish green background color, and is overlaid by extensive light to dark brown blotching. The sides are variably yellowish-green, or yellowish-green and brown, sometimes spotted with white. The ventral surfaces are dirty off-white, mixed with very light grey patches, and sometimes with brown speckling concentrated laterally. The hidden surfaces of the thighs and tarsus are egg-yolk yellow to orange. The iris is yellowish white with thin brown reticulations. The female is similar to the males but is more robust and has relatively narrower head and more greenish coloration.

The male advertisement call is a series of 10–14 bell-like, un-pulsed notes that last for about 5–20 seconds.

== Habitat and conservation ==
Amnihyla spartacus is known from riparian rainforest at elevations of 800–1,345 m (2,625–4,413 ft) above sea level. Males call from branches overhanging torrential streams, some 3–10 m (10–33 ft) above the ground.

Threats to this species are not known. Based on calling males, it is locally abundant. The known range is within a protected area.
