= Cyrtodactylus boreoclivus =

Scientific classification
- Kingdom: Animalia
- Phylum: Chordata
- Class: Reptilia
- Order: Squamata
- Suborder: Gekkota
- Family: Gekkonidae
- Genus: Cyrtodactylus
- Species: C. boreoclivus

Binomial name
- Cyrtodactylus boreoclivus Oliver, Krey, Mumpuni & Richards, 2011

Species of lizard

Cyrtodactylus boreoclivus is a species of gecko endemic to Papua New Guinea.
