= Cyrtodactylus crustulus =

Scientific classification
- Kingdom: Animalia
- Phylum: Chordata
- Class: Reptilia
- Order: Squamata
- Suborder: Gekkota
- Family: Gekkonidae
- Genus: Cyrtodactylus
- Species: C. crustulus

Binomial name
- Cyrtodactylus crustulus Oliver, Hartman, Turner, Wilde, Austin, & Richards, 2020

Species of lizard

The Manus bent-toed gecko (Cyrtodactylus crustulus) is a species of gecko endemic to Manus Island of Papua New Guinea.
