= Hyalotos =

Scientific classification
- Kingdom: Animalia
- Phylum: Chordata
- Class: Amphibia
- Order: Anura
- Family: Pelodryadidae
- Genus: Hyalotos; Richards, Mahony, and Donnellan, 2025

Species
- Hyalotos naispela (Richards, Donnellan & Oliver, 2023); Hyalotos richardsi (Dennis and Cunningham, 2006); Hyalotos singadanae (Richards, 2005)

Genus of amphibians

Hyalotos is a genus of tree frogs in the family Pelodryadidae, native to New Guinea. Species in the genus were previously included within the wastebasket genus Litoria, but were separated into a new genus in 2025. They are small frogs with highly camouflaged skin, mottled many potenitial colours with fringed ornamentation along their legs. Juveniles of at least two species appear to camouflage to bird droppings. All species within this genus have only been seen by scientists a few times, and were discovered in the 21st century.

The genus is named from the Greek hyalos meaning "glass" and otos meaning ear, in reference to their clear tympanum.
