= Parachuting frog =

Scientific classification
- Kingdom: Animalia
- Phylum: Chordata
- Class: Amphibia
- Order: Anura
- Family: Pelodryadidae
- Genus: Sandyrana
- Species: S. pterodactyla

Binomial name
- Sandyrana pterodactyla (Oliver, Richards, and Donnellan, 2019)

Synonyms
- Litoria pterodactyla Oliver, Richards, and Donnellan, 2019; Nyctimystes pterodactyla (Oliver, Richards, and Donnellan, 2019)

Species of frog

The parachuting frog (Sandyrana pterodactyla), or pale-eyed parachuting tree frog, is a species of frog found in New Guinea.

The frog uses its webbed toes to steer when it jumps out of trees, reminiscent of a human steering a parachute with warping. As of 2019, scientists had only seen the parachuting frog once. They found it in the Muller mountain range, 515 meters above sea level.

The scientists used DNA barcoding to examine the parachuting frog and other species found nearby, the Pinocchio frog and montane Pinocchio frog.

The scientific name of this frog, pterodactyla, means "wings on its fingers" and comes from Latin.
