= Eastern frog (disambiguation) =

The eastern frog (Ingerana) is a genus of frogs in the family Dicroglossidae distributed in southeastern Asia, from Nepal, northeastern India, and southwestern China to Indochina, Borneo, and the Philippines.

Eastern frog may also refer to:

- Eastern banjo frog (Limnodynastes dumerilii), a frog in the family Myobatrachidae native to eastern Australia
- Eastern barking frog (Craugastor augusti), a frog in the family Craugastoridae found in Mexico and the southern United States
- Eastern ghost frog (Heleophryne orientalis), a frog in the family Heleophrynidae endemic to Western Cape Province, South Africa
- Eastern golden frog (Pelophylax plancy), a frog in the family Ranidae found in eastern and northeastern China
- Eastern Mindanao frog (Limnonectes diuatus), a frog in the family Dicroglossidae endemic to Mindanao, the Philippines
- Eastern smooth frog (Geocrinia victoriana), a frog in the family Myobatrachidae endemic to Victoria and southern New South Wales, Australia
- Eastern stony creek frog (Litoria wilcoxii), a frog in the family Hylidae endemic to the eastern coast of New South Wales and Queensland, Australia
- Medog eastern frog (Limnonectes medogensis), a frog in the family Dicroglossidae found in Mêdog County, Tibet (China) and in Arunachal Pradesh, northeastern India

== See also ==
- Eastern tree frog (disambiguation)
