= Sandyrana pallidofemora =

Conservation status
- Least Concern (IUCN 3.1)

Scientific classification
- Kingdom: Animalia
- Phylum: Chordata
- Class: Amphibia
- Order: Anura
- Family: Pelodryadidae
- Genus: Sandyrana
- Species: S. pallidofemora

Binomial name
- Sandyrana pallidofemora (Kraus, 2018)

Synonyms
- Litoria pallidofemora Kraus, 2018; Nyctimystes pallidofemora (Kraus, 2018)

Species of frog

Sandyrana pallidofemora is a species of tree frog in the family Pelodryadidae, endemic to Papua New Guinea.

This frog has green coloring on the mucosa of its mouth. Scientists place it in the same species group as the northern New Guinea tree frog.
