= Sandyrana nullicedens =

Conservation status
- Least Concern (IUCN 3.1)

Scientific classification
- Kingdom: Animalia
- Phylum: Chordata
- Class: Amphibia
- Order: Anura
- Family: Pelodryadidae
- Genus: Sandyrana
- Species: S. nullicedens

Binomial name
- Sandyrana nullicedens (Kraus, 2018)

Synonyms
- Litoria nullicedens Kraus, 2018; Nyctimystes nullicedens

Species of frog

Sandyrana nullicedens is a species of tree frog in the family Pelodryadidae. It is endemic to Papua New Guinea and has been found on the south-western side of Mount Obree, at 550 meters above sea level.

== Taxonomy ==
This species is related to the northern New Guinea tree frog.

== Description ==
Sandyrana nullicedens has green pigmentation on the mucosa of its mouth.

== Threats ==
The IUCN classifies this frog as least concern of extinction but notes that the risk of chytrid fungus entering its habitat poses a threat. Scientists recommend ex situ breeding programs.
