= Baiyer River Sanctuary =

- Location within Papua New Guinea
- Coordinates: 5.5°S 144.1667°E
- Area: 740 ha (1,800 acres)
- Established: 1968

The Baiyer River Sanctuary is a nature reserve along the Baiyer River in Western Highlands Province of Papua-New Guinea. It was opened on 13 January 1968 by the then-Australian administration. It has been expanded to a current area of 740 hectares. The reserve lies at elevations of between 800 and 1200 meters.

- Annual rainfall: 259 cm
- Bird species: 185, including varieties of bird-of-paradise
- Mammal species: 8, including rats, opossums, kangaroos and bandicoots
- Amphibians: Litoria oenicolen has only been found in the reserve, from only two specimens.
- Flora: oaks are the predominant forest species here.
- Address: Superintendent, Baiyer River Sanctuary, P O Box 490, Mt Hagen
- Useful other information: The sanctuary is about 40 km outside of Mt Hagen. The road is good to average. The first road section is sealed whilst the latter section remains as a gravel track but navigable by a land vehicle. There are no signs to show directions to the sanctuary. The park does not have any facility inside as what existed before is already destroyed. Some renovation is currently in-progress. The forest cover is good and much remains in virgin state. Sound of birds is abundant. It requires extensive trailing inside the forest to watch birds. However, it is not advisable to visit the reserve for a tourist at this stage.

The area of the reserve had been the scene of considerable unrest over years and the main buildings had been burned down.
