= Sandyrana dux =

Conservation status
- Least Concern (IUCN 3.1)

Scientific classification
- Kingdom: Animalia
- Phylum: Chordata
- Class: Amphibia
- Order: Anura
- Family: Pelodryadidae
- Genus: Sandyrana
- Species: S. dux

Binomial name
- Sandyrana dux (Richards & Oliver, 2006)

Synonyms
- Litoria dux Richards & Oliver, 2006

Species of frog

Sandyrana dux is a species of frog in the family Pelodryadidae. This fairly large tree frog is mainly green. It is endemic to the Huon Peninsula in Papua New Guinea. It was separated from Sandyrana graminea by Richards & Oliver, 2006.
