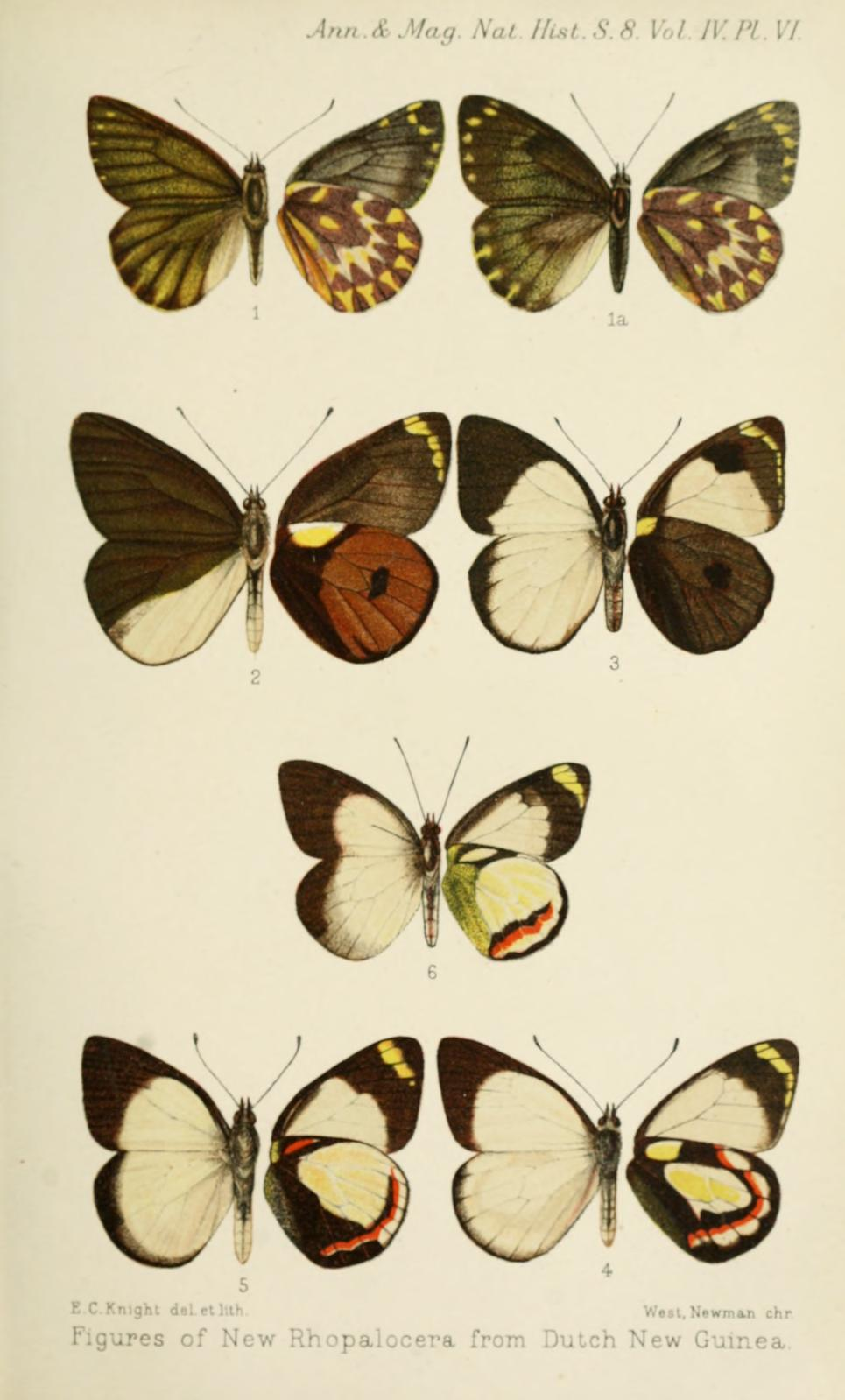
- Delias heroni in Kenrick, 1909 Descriptions of Delias from New Guinea

Scientific classification
- Kingdom: Animalia
- Phylum: Arthropoda
- Clade: Pancrustacea
- Class: Insecta
- Order: Lepidoptera
- Family: Pieridae
- Genus: Delias
- Species: D. heroni

Binomial name
- Delias heroni Kenrick, 1909

Synonyms
- Delias heroni f. albo-oculatus Joicey & Noakes, 1915

= Delias heroni =

Species of butterfly

Delias heroni is a butterfly in the family Pieridae. It was described by George Hamilton Kenrick in 1909. It is found in New Guinea (Arfak Mountains).

The wingspan is about 45 mm.

== Description ==
Delias heroni, sp.n. (Pl. VI. fig. 3.)

Male: Differs from pratti in the fore wings being broader and shorter; the upperside is black, without bronze reflections; four-fifths of the cell and three-quarters of the inner margin is white; in the hind wings the whole is white, with a black patch at the apex, tapering rapidly into a narrow black border. Underside: the white occupies half the fore wings, and there is a distinct black patch at the end of the cell.The hind wing has no white costal streak, a smaller yellow costal patch at the base, and the black spot double, of quite a different shape, and horizontal, and the whole colour blacker; the large duller bronzy patch is different in shape.Expanse 50 mm. Hab. Momi, 4000 feet, November and December.
