= Bufol =

Steroid found in toads and frogs

Names
- IUPAC name 5α:(3R,5R,7R,8R,9S,10S,12S,13R,14S,17R)-17-[(2R)-6,7-dihydroxy-6-methylheptan-2-yl]-10,13-dimethyl-2,3,4,5,6,7,8,9,11,12,14,15,16,17-tetradecahydro-1H-cyclopenta[a]phenanthrene-3,7,12-triol 5β:(3R,5S,7R,8R,9S,10S,12S,13R,14S,17R)-17-[(2R)-6,7-dihydroxy-6-methylheptan-2-yl]-10,13-dimethyl-2,3,4,5,6,7,8,9,11,12,14,15,16,17-tetradecahydro-1H-cyclopenta[a]phenanthrene-3,7,12-triol

Identifiers
3D model (JSmol)	Interactive image
ChEBI	CHEBI:182127
ChemSpider	4447281
- InChI: InChI=1S/C27H48O5/c1-16(6-5-10-25(2,32)15-28)19-7-8-20-24-21(14-23(31)27(19,20)4)26(3)11-9-18(29)12-17(26)13-22(24)30/h16-24,28-32H,5-15H2,1-4H3/t16-,17-,18-,19-,20+,21+,22-,23+,24+,25?,26+,27-/m1/s1 Key: XZDHXPDYLPEFQI-GIQUADRUSA-N
- SMILES: C[C@H](CCCC(C)(CO)O)[C@H]1CC[C@@H]2[C@@]1([C@H](C[C@H]3[C@H]2[C@@H](C[C@@H]4[C@@]3(CC[C@H](C4)O)C)O)O)C

Identifiers
CAS Number	6127-75-9
3D model (JSmol)	Interactive image
ChEBI	CHEBI:194331
- InChI: InChI=1S/C27H48O5/c1-16(6-5-10-25(2,32)15-28)19-7-8-20-24-21(14-23(31)27(19,20)4)26(3)11-9-18(29)12-17(26)13-22(24)30/h16-24,28-32H,5-15H2,1-4H3/t16-,17+,18-,19-,20+,21+,22-,23+,24+,25?,26+,27-/m1/s1 Key: XZDHXPDYLPEFQI-FIMPYCPFSA-N
- SMILES: C[C@H](CCCC(C)(CO)O)[C@H]1CC[C@@H]2[C@@]1([C@H](C[C@H]3[C@H]2[C@@H](C[C@H]4[C@@]3(CC[C@H](C4)O)C)O)O)C

Properties
Chemical formula	C_{27}H_{48}O_{5}
Molar mass	452.676 g·mol^{−1}
- Except where otherwise noted, data are given for materials in their standard state (at 25 °C [77 °F], 100 kPa). Infobox references

Bufol is a steroid and/or 'bile alcohol' found in toads and frogs, which is secreted from the gallbladder of certain species of toads, frogs and other animals. In a broad biological sense, bufol can be classified as a lipid, as it is a polyatomic bile alcohol with a steroidal structure.

== Natural occurrence ==
Stereoisomers (5α-bufol and 5β-bufol) were found in the gallbladder of the following amphibians:

5α-bufol: Lepidosiren paradoxa, Neoceratodus forsteri, Ptychadena mascareniensis, Hylarana albolabris, Rana plancyi.

5β-bufol: Bufo japonicus, Bufo bufo, Rhinella marina, Sclerophrys regularis, Sclerophrys maculata (Bufo maculatus).
