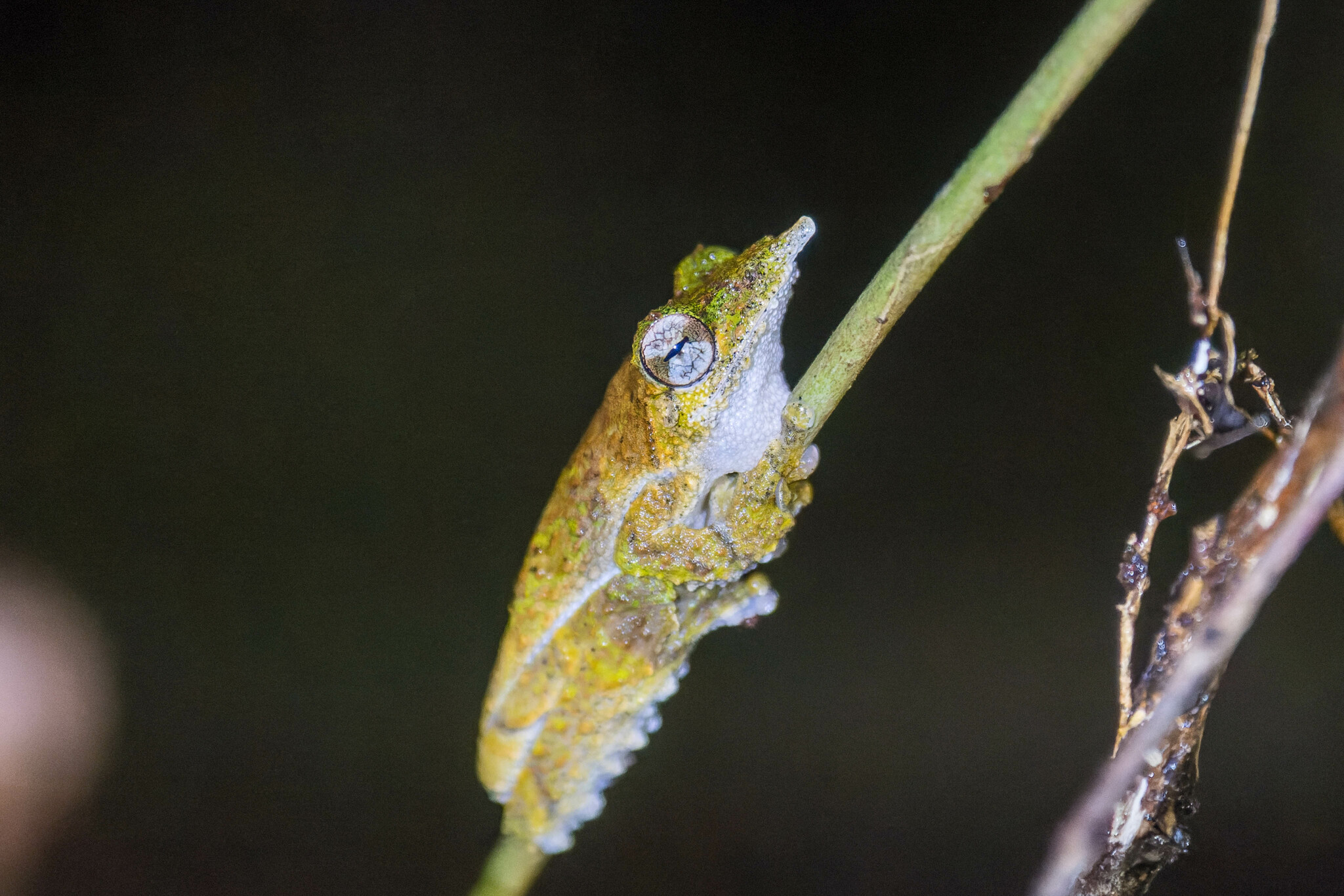
- Efogi tree frog (Exochohyla prora) from North Fly District, Papua New Guinea

Scientific classification
- Kingdom: Animalia
- Phylum: Chordata
- Class: Amphibia
- Order: Anura
- Family: Pelodryadidae
- Genus: Exochohyla; Mahony, Donnellan, and Richards, 2025

Species
- Exochohyla chrisdahli (Richards, 2007); Exochohyla hilli (Hiaso and Richards, 2006); Exochohyla humboldtorum (Günther, 2006); Exochohyla prora (Menzies, 1969)

= Exochohyla =

Genus of amphibians

Exochohyla is a genus of tree frogs in the family Pelodryadidae, native to the forests of New Guinea. Species in the genus were previously included within the wastebasket genus Litoria, but were separated into a new genus in 2025. They are small-to-medium sized frogs with highly camouflaged skin, mottled many potenitial colours with fringed ornamentation along their legs. Both males and females have a very distinctive spike on their nose, which differentiates them from all other Pelodryadidae (though male Nasutibatrachus and Teretistes also have a nose spike). They breed in ephemeral ponds within forests, laying eggs of leaves above the water so tadpoles can drop into the water when they hatch.

The genus is named from the Greek exochos meaning "projecting or jutting out" in reference to their nose, and the first genus name for tree frogs Hyla (derived from the Greek Hylas).
