= Amnihyla fuscula =

Conservation status
- Data Deficient (IUCN 3.1)

Scientific classification
- Kingdom: Animalia
- Phylum: Chordata
- Class: Amphibia
- Order: Anura
- Family: Pelodryadidae
- Genus: Amnihyla
- Species: A. fuscula

Binomial name
- Amnihyla fuscula (Oliver and Richards, 2007)

Synonyms
- Litoria fuscula Oliver and Richards, 2007; Dryopsophus fusculus (Oliver and Richards, 2007); Ranoidea fuscula (Oliver and Richards, 2007)

Species of tree frog

Amnihyla fuscula is a species of tree frog in the subfamily Pelodryadinae, endemic to Indonesia. Scientists have observed it in the Derewo River Basin in Papua Province, at 1,890 m (6,200 ft) above sea level.

This frog lives in mountain streams. Ranoidea fusculais closely related to Ranoidea dorsivena.

== Original description ==
- Oliver, P. M. & Richards, S. J. (2007). "A new species of montane stream- dwelling Litoria from Papua, Indonesia (Anura: Hylidae)". Hamadryad. 31 (2): 299–303.
