= Eastern tree frog =

Eastern tree frog may refer to:

- Cope's eastern Paraguay tree frog (Hypsiboas polytaenius), a frog in the family Hylidae endemic to Brazil
- Eastern dwarf tree frog (Litoria fallax) a frog in the family Hylidae found on the eastern coast of Queensland and New South Wales, Australia
- Eastern gray tree frog (Hyla versicolor), a frog in the family Hylidae native to the eastern United States and southeastern Canada
- Eastern mountains tree frog (Litoria dorsivena), a frog in the family Hylidae endemic to Papua New Guinea
- Hyla orientalis, also known as Eastern tree frog, a frog in the family Hylidae found in Asia Minor and southeastern Europe
