= Cope's tree frog =

Cope's tree frog may refer to:

- Cope's brown treefrog (Ecnomiohyla miliaria), a frog in the family Hylidae found in Costa Rica, Nicaragua, and Panama
- Cope's eastern Paraguay tree frog (Hypsiboas polytaenius), a frog in the family Hylidae endemic to Brazil
- Cope's gray tree frog (Hyla chrysoscelis), a frog in the family Hylidae found in the United States

== See also ==
- Cope's frog, Hylarana leptoglossa
