= Kallistobatrachus ollauro =

Conservation status
- Least Concern (IUCN 3.1)

Scientific classification
- Kingdom: Animalia
- Phylum: Chordata
- Class: Amphibia
- Order: Anura
- Family: Pelodryadidae
- Genus: Kallistobatrachus
- Species: K. ollauro

Binomial name
- Kallistobatrachus ollauro (Menzies, 1993)

Synonyms
- Litoria ollauro Menzies, 1993

Species of frog

Kallistobatrachus ollauro is a species of frog in the family Pelodryadidae, endemic to Papua New Guinea. Its natural habitats are subtropical or tropical moist montane forests, freshwater marshes, intermittent freshwater marshes, and rural gardens. It is threatened by habitat loss.
