= Arfak Mountain tree frog =

Conservation status
- Least Concern (IUCN 3.1)

Scientific classification
- Kingdom: Animalia
- Phylum: Chordata
- Class: Amphibia
- Order: Anura
- Family: Pelodryadidae
- Genus: Kallistobatrachus
- Species: K. chloronotus

Binomial name
- Kallistobatrachus chloronotus (Boulenger, 1911)

Synonyms
- Litoria chloronata (Boulenger, 1911)

Species of amphibian

The Arfak Mountain tree frog (Kallistobatrachus chloronotus) is a species of frog in the subfamily Pelodryadinae. It is endemic to West Papua, Indonesia. Its natural habitats are subtropical or tropical moist montane forests, rivers, rural gardens, and heavily degraded former forest. The threats are not known and is thought to be locally protected and occurs in Arfak Mountains National Park.
