= Wendessi tree frog =

Conservation status
- Data Deficient (IUCN 3.1)

Scientific classification
- Kingdom: Animalia
- Phylum: Chordata
- Class: Amphibia
- Order: Anura
- Family: Pelodryadidae
- Genus: Amnihyla
- Species: A. longicrus

Binomial name
- Amnihyla longicrus (Boulenger, 1911)

Synonyms
- Litoria longicrus (Boulenger, 1911)

Species of amphibian

The Wendessi tree frog (Amnihyla longicrus) is a species of frog in the subfamily Pelodryadinae.

It is found in New Guinea.

Its natural habitats are subtropical or tropical moist lowland forests and rivers.

== Description ==
It has finger disks as large as the eardrum; toes almost entirely webbed on outer half of toes; very weak sub-articular tubercles. From snout to cloaca is 33 mm.

Dorsal surface smooth or finely bordered; belly and base of lower surface of thighs granulated; smooth throat; no chest crease. Coloration is green above; sides, upper surface of thighs and hands and feet are colorless, with green dots or lattices; there is a white stripe below the eye to the corner of the mouth, with a white throat and belly.
