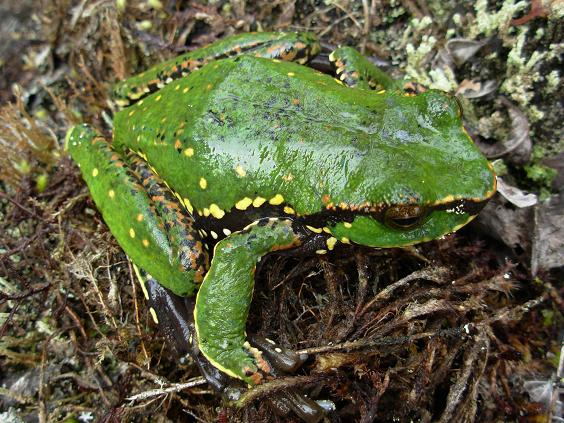

Conservation status
- Least Concern (IUCN 3.1)

Scientific classification
- Kingdom: Animalia
- Phylum: Chordata
- Class: Amphibia
- Order: Anura
- Family: Pelodryadidae
- Genus: Amnihyla
- Species: A. angiana

Binomial name
- Amnihyla angiana (Boulenger, 1915)

Synonyms
- Litoria mintima (Tyler, 1962); Litoria angiana Boulenger, 1915)

= Angiana tree frog =

Species of amphibian

The Angiana tree frog (Amnihyla angiana) is a species of frog in the subfamily Pelodryadinae. It is found in New Guinea. Its natural habitats are subtropical or tropical moist montane forests and rivers.

== Description ==
There are several different polymorphs, with each given a different name in the Kalam language of Papua New Guinea Examples include:

- bright green polymorph; usually found in Saurauia spp. and Ficus dammaropsis
- dark green or black polymorph
- dark with reddish belly
- dull brown polymorph
- black polymorph
