= Amnihyla pratti =

Pratt's tree frog

Conservation status
- Data Deficient (IUCN 3.1)

Scientific classification
- Kingdom: Animalia
- Phylum: Chordata
- Class: Amphibia
- Order: Anura
- Family: Pelodryadidae
- Genus: Amnihyla
- Species: A. pratti

Binomial name
- Amnihyla pratti (Boulenger, 1911)

Synonyms
- Hyla pratti Boulenger, 1911; Hyla montana pratti Loveridge, 1948; Litoria pratti Tyler, 1971; Ranoidea pratti Dubois and Frétey, 2016; Dryopsophus pratti Duellman, Marion, & Hedges, 2016

Species of amphibian

Amnihyla pratti, commonly known as Pratt's tree frog, is a species of frog in the subfamily Pelodryadinae. It is endemic to the Vogelkopf Peninsula, West Papua, Indonesia, where the type series was collected. There are no confirmed records of this species after it was first recorded, so very little information exists on it.

Amnihyla pratti is named after Antwerp Edgar Pratt, an explorer who collected the type series.
