= Hyalotos singadanae =

Conservation status
- Data Deficient (IUCN 3.1)

Scientific classification
- Kingdom: Animalia
- Phylum: Chordata
- Class: Amphibia
- Order: Anura
- Family: Pelodryadidae
- Genus: Hyalotos
- Species: H. singadanae

Binomial name
- Hyalotos singadanae (Richards, 2005)

Synonyms
- Litoria singadanae Richards, 2005

Species of amphibian

Hyalotos singadanae is a species of small green tree frogs reaching 35mm in length. It has long back legs, extensive webbing on the fingers and a prominent tympanum.

== Discovery ==
This frog was discovered in 2005 when one female and two male specimens were sighted during the day camouflaged against bark of large felled tree trunks. The individuals were collected on a ridge above Surim Camp at about 1,280m altitude in the eastern Finisterre Mountains of the Huon Peninsula, Morobe Province, Papua New Guinea. There are most likely to occur in Low Montane Rain Forest which has good soil drainage because at the collection site there was no free-standing water. No further individuals have been collected and there is still no additional information on its extent of occurrence, status and ecological requirements.
