= West Sepik tree frog =

Conservation status
- Least Concern (IUCN 3.1)

Scientific classification
- Kingdom: Animalia
- Phylum: Chordata
- Class: Amphibia
- Order: Anura
- Family: Pelodryadidae
- Genus: Amnihyla
- Species: A. leucova

Binomial name
- Amnihyla leucova (Tyler, 1968)

Synonyms
- Litoria leucova (Tyler, 1968)

Species of amphibian

The West Sepik tree frog (Amnihyla leucova) is a species of frog in the family Pelodryadidae. It is endemic to Papua New Guinea. Its natural habitats are subtropical or tropical moist montane forests and rivers.
