= Snow Mountains tree frog =

Conservation status
- Least Concern (IUCN 3.1)

Scientific classification
- Kingdom: Animalia
- Phylum: Chordata
- Class: Amphibia
- Order: Anura
- Family: Pelodryadidae
- Genus: Amnihyla
- Species: A. napaea

Binomial name
- Amnihyla napaea (Tyler, 1968)

Synonyms
- Litoria napaea (Tyler, 1968); Ranoidea napea (Tyler, 1968)

Species of amphibian

The Snow Mountains tree frog (Amnihyla napaea) is a species of frog in the subfamily Pelodryadinae, endemic to West Papua, Indonesia. Its natural habitats are subtropical or tropical moist lowland forests and rivers.

== Range ==
This species is known to populate the mountains of Papua, Indonesia, as well as two locations in the Wapoga River headwaters (where the species was found in 1998). One specimen was collected 40 km southeast of Nabire in Papua. It has been recorded between about 500 and 1,000 m above sea level.
