= Sabang tree frog =

Conservation status
- Least Concern (IUCN 3.1)

Scientific classification
- Kingdom: Animalia
- Phylum: Chordata
- Class: Amphibia
- Order: Anura
- Family: Pelodryadidae
- Genus: Sandyrana
- Species: S. sanguinolenta

Binomial name
- Sandyrana sanguinolenta (van Kampen, 1909)

Synonyms
- Litoria sanguinolenta (van Kampen, 1909); Nyctimystes sanguinolenta

Species of amphibian

The Sabang tree frog (Sandyrana sanguinolenta) is a species of frog in the family Pelodryadidae. It is endemic to West Papua, Indonesia. Its natural habitats are subtropical or tropical moist lowland forests.
