= Amnihyla megalops =

Conservation status
- Data Deficient (IUCN 3.1)

Scientific classification
- Kingdom: Animalia
- Phylum: Chordata
- Class: Amphibia
- Order: Anura
- Family: Pelodryadidae
- Genus: Amnihyla
- Species: A. megalops

Binomial name
- Amnihyla megalops (Richards & Iskandar, 2006)

Synonyms
- Litoria megalops Richards & Iskander, 2006

Species of frog

Amnihyla megalops is a species of frog in the subfamily Pelodryadinae. It is endemic to Papua New Guinea.
