= Multi-coloured tree frog =

Conservation status
- Data Deficient (IUCN 3.1)

Scientific classification
- Kingdom: Animalia
- Phylum: Chordata
- Class: Amphibia
- Order: Anura
- Family: Pelodryadidae
- Genus: Sandyrana
- Species: S. multicolor

Binomial name
- Sandyrana multicolor (Günther, 2004)

Synonyms
- Litoria multicolor Günther, 2004; Nyctimystes multicolor

Species of amphibian

The multi-coloured tree frog or multi-coloured frog (Sandyrana multicolor) is a species of frog in the family Pelodryadidae. It is endemic to West Papua, Indonesia. It has been observed about 950 meters above sea level. Its natural habitats are subtropical or tropical moist lowland forests, subtropical or tropical moist montane forests, swamps, and freshwater marshes. It is threatened by habitat loss.
