= Kallistobatrachus majikthise =

Conservation status
- Least Concern (IUCN 3.1)

Scientific classification
- Kingdom: Animalia
- Phylum: Chordata
- Class: Amphibia
- Order: Anura
- Family: Pelodryadidae
- Genus: Kallistobatrachus
- Species: K. majikthise

Binomial name
- Kallistobatrachus majikthise (Johnston & Richards, 1994)

Synonyms
- Litoria majikthise Johnston & Richards, 1994

Species of frog

Kallistobatrachus majikthise is a species of frog in the family Pelodryadidae, found in New Guinea. Its natural habitats are subtropical or tropical moist lowland forests, subtropical or tropical swamps, rivers, and swamps, and it is threatened by habitat loss.

== Taxonomy ==
Litoria majikthise was described in 1994 by Johnston and Richard. "Majikthise" is a reference to both the fictional philosopher Majikthise in The Hitchhiker's Guide to the Galaxy, and the frog's "vividly coloured thighs and groin."
