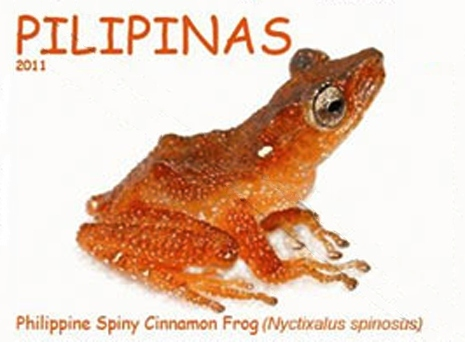

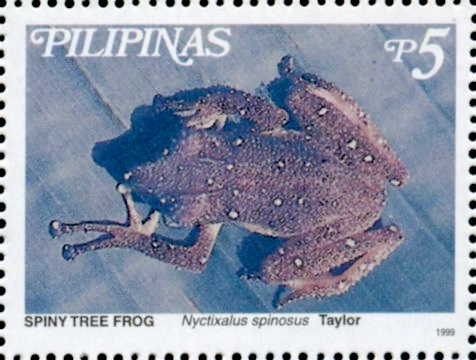

Conservation status
- Least Concern (IUCN 3.1)

Scientific classification
- Kingdom: Animalia
- Phylum: Chordata
- Class: Amphibia
- Order: Anura
- Family: Rhacophoridae
- Genus: Nyctixalus
- Species: N. spinosus

Binomial name
- Nyctixalus spinosus (Taylor, 1920)

Synonyms
- Hazelia spinosa Taylor, 1920; Theloderma spinosum (Taylor, 1920); Philautus spinosus (Taylor, 1920); Rhacophorus spinosus (Taylor, 1920); Rhacophorus leprosus spinosus (Taylor, 1920)

= Spiny tree frog =

Species of amphibian

"Spiny Tree Frog" is also used for Litoria spinifera from New Guinea.

The spiny tree frog (Nyctixalus spinosum) is a species of frog in the family Rhacophoridae. It is endemic to the Philippines and occurs on Mindanao, Leyte, Bohol, and Basilan, possibly wider.

== Description ==
Males measure about 35 mm (1.4 in) and females about 41 mm (1.6 in) in snout–vent length. The body is elongated, tapering from the temporal region. There are prominent spinose tubercles on all dorsal surfaces, especially on the eyelids. The tympanum is distinct. The colouration is brown about with some yellow spots, and yellow or orange below. Fingers are unwebbed but toes have some webbing. Males have nuptial pads but appear to lack vocal sacks.

== Habitat and conservation ==
Its natural habitats are montane and lowland rainforests. It is a forest floor species that lays its eggs in tree holes. It is threatened by habitat loss caused by agriculture and human settlement.
