= Nodugl tree frog =

Conservation status
- Least Concern (IUCN 3.1)

Scientific classification
- Kingdom: Animalia
- Phylum: Chordata
- Class: Amphibia
- Order: Anura
- Family: Pelodryadidae
- Genus: Amnihyla
- Species: A. micromembrana

Binomial name
- Amnihyla micromembrana (Tyler, 1963)

Synonyms
- Litoria micromembrana (Tyler, 1963)

Species of amphibian

The Nodugl tree frog (Amnihyla micromembrana) is a species of frog in the subfamily Pelodryadinae. It is found in New Guinea.

== Habitat ==
Its natural habitats are subtropical or tropical moist montane forests, rivers, and heavily degraded former forests.

In the Upper Kaironk Valley of Madang Province, Papua New Guinea, it is frequently found among Miscanthus cane.
