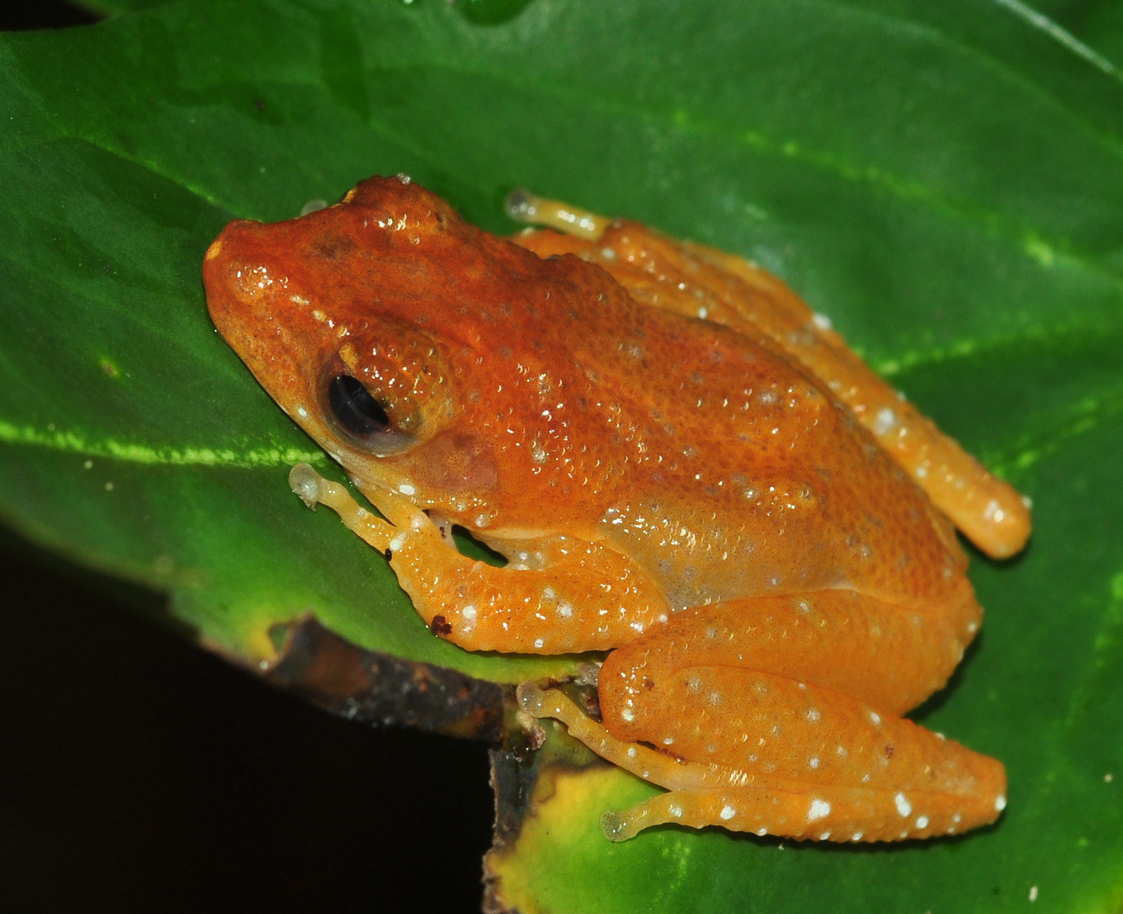
- Nyctixalus pictus

Scientific classification
- Domain: Eukaryota
- Kingdom: Animalia
- Phylum: Chordata
- Class: Amphibia
- Order: Anura
- Family: Rhacophoridae
- Subfamily: Rhacophorinae
- Genus: Nyctixalus; Boulenger, 1882

Species
- 3, see text

Synonyms
- Hazelia Taylor, 1920; Edwardtayloria Marx, 1975

= Nyctixalus =

Genus of amphibians

Nyctixalus is a genus of frogs in the family Rhacophoridae. The common name is Indonesian tree frogs. They can be found in the Malay Peninsula, Sumatra, Java, Borneo, the Philippines, and southern Vietnam. Nyctixalus is the sister taxon of Theloderma. It has also been considered subgenus of Theloderma, but the most recent research treat it as a distinct genus.

== Description ==
Nyctixalus are medium-sized frogs with adults being 30–40 mm (1.2–1.6 in) in snout–vent length. Their body and limbs have numerous spiny tubercles. Fingers are free or webbed at base. Vocal sac is always absent.

== Species ==
There are three species in the genus:

- Nyctixalus margaritifer Boulenger, 1882
- Nyctixalus pictus (Peters, 1871)
- Nyctixalus spinosus (Taylor, 1920)
