= Amnihyla rara =

Conservation status
- Data Deficient (IUCN 3.1)

Scientific classification
- Kingdom: Animalia
- Phylum: Chordata
- Class: Amphibia
- Order: Anura
- Family: Pelodryadidae
- Genus: Amnihyla
- Species: A. rara

Binomial name
- Amnihyla rara (Günther and Richards, 2005)

Synonyms
- Litoria rara Günther and Richards, 2005; Dryopsophus rarus (Günther and Richards, 2005); Ranoidea rara (Günther and Richards, 2005)

Species of amphibian

Amnihyla rara is a species of frog in the subfamily Pelodryadinae, endemic to Indonesia. Scientists have observed it in Papua Province, about 750 meters above sea level.
