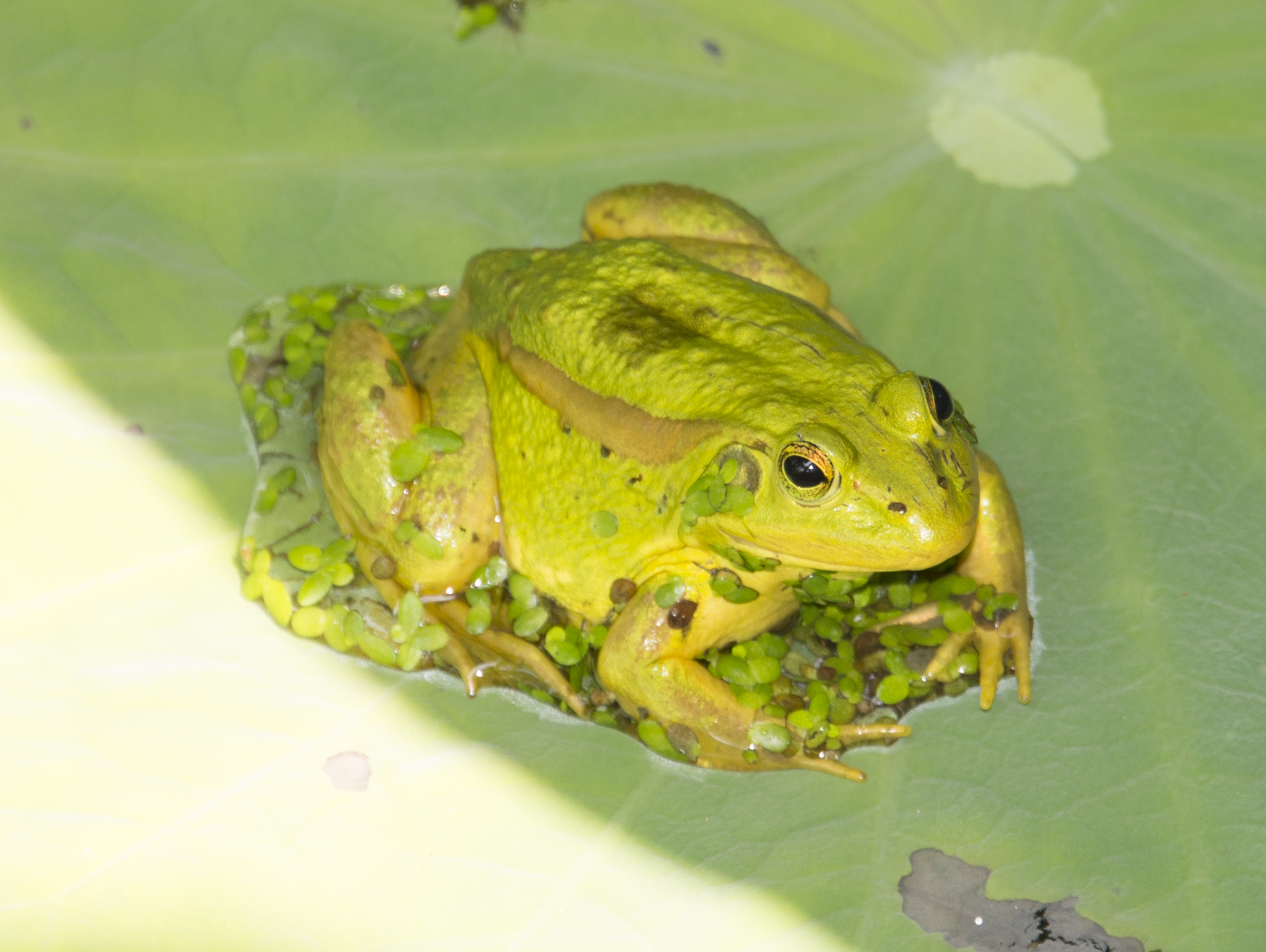

Conservation status
- Vulnerable (IUCN 3.1)

Scientific classification
- Kingdom: Animalia
- Phylum: Chordata
- Class: Amphibia
- Order: Anura
- Family: Ranidae
- Genus: Pelophylax
- Species: P. chosenicus

Binomial name
- Pelophylax chosenicus (Okada, 1931)
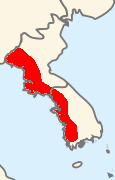
- Range of Pelophylax chosenicus

Synonyms
- Rana nigromaculata chosenica Okada, 1931; Rana plancyi chosenica

= Seoul frog =

Species of amphibian

The Seoul frog or Seoul pond frog (Pelophylax chosenicus) is a species of true frog found on the southern and western Korean Peninsula and possibly Liaoning of China. It is closely related to the eastern golden frog, P. plancyi, and was long considered a subspecies thereof. Also known as gold-spotted pond frog, it is in fact not a true pond frog of genus Rana, but belongs to the water frogs now again separated in Pelophylax.

Adult Seoul frogs are roughly 6 centimeters in length. The back is bright green and bumpy, with patches of light brown; the belly is yellowish-red. The iris of the eye is golden. The body as a whole is round as if swollen.

The Seoul frog is found in ponds and rice paddies, but has been declining sharply, probably due to habitat degradation. According to Matsui (2004), recent surveys have located populations in only four locations. The mating season is from mid-May to June.

The Seoul frog is listed as an "Endangered category II species" in South Korea.
