= Oruge tree frog =

Conservation status
- Least Concern (IUCN 3.1)

Scientific classification
- Kingdom: Animalia
- Phylum: Chordata
- Class: Amphibia
- Order: Anura
- Family: Pelodryadidae
- Genus: Amnihyla
- Species: A. modica

Binomial name
- Amnihyla modica (Tyler, 1968)

Synonyms
- Litoria modica (Tyler, 1968)

Species of amphibian

The Oruge tree frog (Amnihyla modica) is a species of frog in the subfamily Pelodryadinae. It is found in New Guinea. Its natural habitats are subtropical or tropical moist montane forests and rivers.

== Names ==
It is known as wyt in the Kalam language of Papua New Guinea.
