= Sandyrana purpureolata =

Conservation status
- Least Concern (IUCN 3.1)

Scientific classification
- Kingdom: Animalia
- Phylum: Chordata
- Class: Amphibia
- Order: Anura
- Family: Pelodryadidae
- Genus: Sandyrana
- Species: S. purpureolata

Binomial name
- Sandyrana purpureolata (Oliver, Richards, Tjaturadi, and Iskandar, 2007)

Synonyms
- Litoria purpureolata Oliver, Richards, Tjaturadi, and Iskandar, 2007; Nyctimystes purpureolatus

Species of frog

Sandyrana purpureolata is a species of frog in the family Pelodryadidae. It is endemic to New Guinea and is known from its type locality on the Tiri River, a small tributary of the Mamberamo River in West Papua, Indonesia, and from three locations in West Sepik Province, Papua New Guinea.

== Description ==
Adult males measure 56–68 mm (2.2–2.7 in) in snout–vent length; no females were included in the type series. The body is relatively slender. The snout is truncate. The tympanum is moderately large, obscured dorsally by the supratympanic fold. The fingers and the toes have prominent discs. The fingers have moderate webbing; the toes have more extensive webbing. The dorsum is entirely light green. The limbs have prominent white dermal folds. The lower lip has indistinct white labial stripe, and the eye is surrounded by a white ring. The lateral surfaces of the body are light purple with extensive cream blotching in between. The limbs have partly purple lateral surfaces. to purple.

The male advertisement call is a distinctly pulsed note emitted in very long series. The dominant frequency is 1720–1890 Hz.

== Habitat and conservation ==
The type series was collected from a shallow swamp in primary lowland rainforest. Males were observed calling from palm leaves 4–6 m (13–20 ft) above the water.

Threats to this species are unknown.
