= Beck's tree frog =

Conservation status
- Least Concern (IUCN 3.1)

Scientific classification
- Kingdom: Animalia
- Phylum: Chordata
- Class: Amphibia
- Order: Anura
- Family: Pelodryadidae
- Genus: Amnihyla
- Species: A. becki

Binomial name
- Amnihyla becki (Loveridge, 1945)

Synonyms
- Hyla becki Loveridge, 1945; Ranoidea becki (Loveridge, 1945); Litoria becki (Loveridge, 1945)

Species of amphibian

Beck's tree frog (Amnihyla becki) is a species of frog in the subfamily Pelodryadinae. It is endemic to Papua New Guinea. Its natural habitats are tropical moist montane forests, grasslands and streams. It was first described by the British biologist and herpetologist Arthur Loveridge in 1945 and is named in honour of the American ornithologist and explorer Rollo Beck who led the Whitney South Seas Expedition in the 1920s, collecting bird and other specimens from thousands of islands in the South Pacific.

== Description ==
Beck's tree frog is a fairly large tree frog with a snout-to-vent length of between 34 and 44 mm (1.3 and 1.7 in). The head is about as wide as it is long, with small, widely separated nostrils and tympani (eardrums) somewhat smaller than the eyes. Both fingers and toes are long with the toes being webbed while the fingers have disced tips and are unwebbed, the third finger being the longest. The skin is rather coarse, especially on the head and eyelids, but in other parts of the body it is finer. The upper parts of head and body are brown or dark green, and the underparts are streaked with dark colour.

== Distribution and habitat ==
Beck's tree frog is endemic to the mountainous regions of Papua New Guinea. It was at first only known from the two highest mountains in the country, Mount Wilhelm in the Bismarck Range and Mount Giluwe in the Southern Highlands. Specimens have been found at altitudes of over 3,000 metres (9,800 ft). In 2007, a previously unknown population was discovered at an altitude of 3,200 metres (10,500 ft) in the Kaijende Highlands in Enga Province. The typical habitat of this frog is mountain grassland including boggy areas with pools. It breeds in rapid mountain streams, the large eggs being stuck onto the underside of stones. The tadpoles are not known.

== Status ==
Very little is known of this frog and its habits. The high-altitude sites at which it has been observed are far from human settlements and subject to little human impact. It might be vulnerable to the amphibian disease chytridiomycosis which affects some montane, torrent-dwelling frog species in Australia. The IUCN has listed it as being of "least concern".
