= Amnihyla scabra =

Conservation status
- Least Concern (IUCN 3.1)

Scientific classification
- Kingdom: Animalia
- Phylum: Chordata
- Class: Amphibia
- Order: Anura
- Family: Pelodryadidae
- Genus: Amnihyla
- Species: A. scabra

Binomial name
- Amnihyla scabra Günther and Richards, 2005

Synonyms
- Litoria scabra (Günther and Richards, 2005)

Species of amphibian

Amnihyla scabra is a species of frog in the subfamily Pelodryadinae. It is endemic to Western New Guinea (Indonesia).

== Habitat and conservation ==
Litoria scabra is currently only known from its type locality in the Wapoga River headwaters at an elevation of 1,070 m (3,510 ft) above sea level. It lives in and near fast-flowing streams. While its known range is very limited, it lives in a region with large areas of suitable habitat that are not under significant threat.
