= Western Highland treefrog =

Conservation status
- Least Concern (IUCN 3.1)

Scientific classification
- Kingdom: Animalia
- Phylum: Chordata
- Class: Amphibia
- Order: Anura
- Family: Pelodryadidae
- Genus: Kallistobatrachus
- Species: K. iris

Binomial name
- Kallistobatrachus iris (Tyler, 1962)

Synonyms
- Litoria iris (Tyler, 1962)

Species of amphibian

The Western Highland treefrog (Kallistobatrachus iris) is a species of frog in the family Pelodryadidae found found in New Guinea. Its natural habitats are tropical moist forests, both pristine and degraded, above 1,500 metres (4,900 ft), with a single record at 1,000 metres (3,300 ft). The western highland frog is often very brightly coloured, with a mottled green, brown and/or yellow back, and the flash colouration on the inner thigh is bright blue, red or yellow and often blotched with white or purple.
