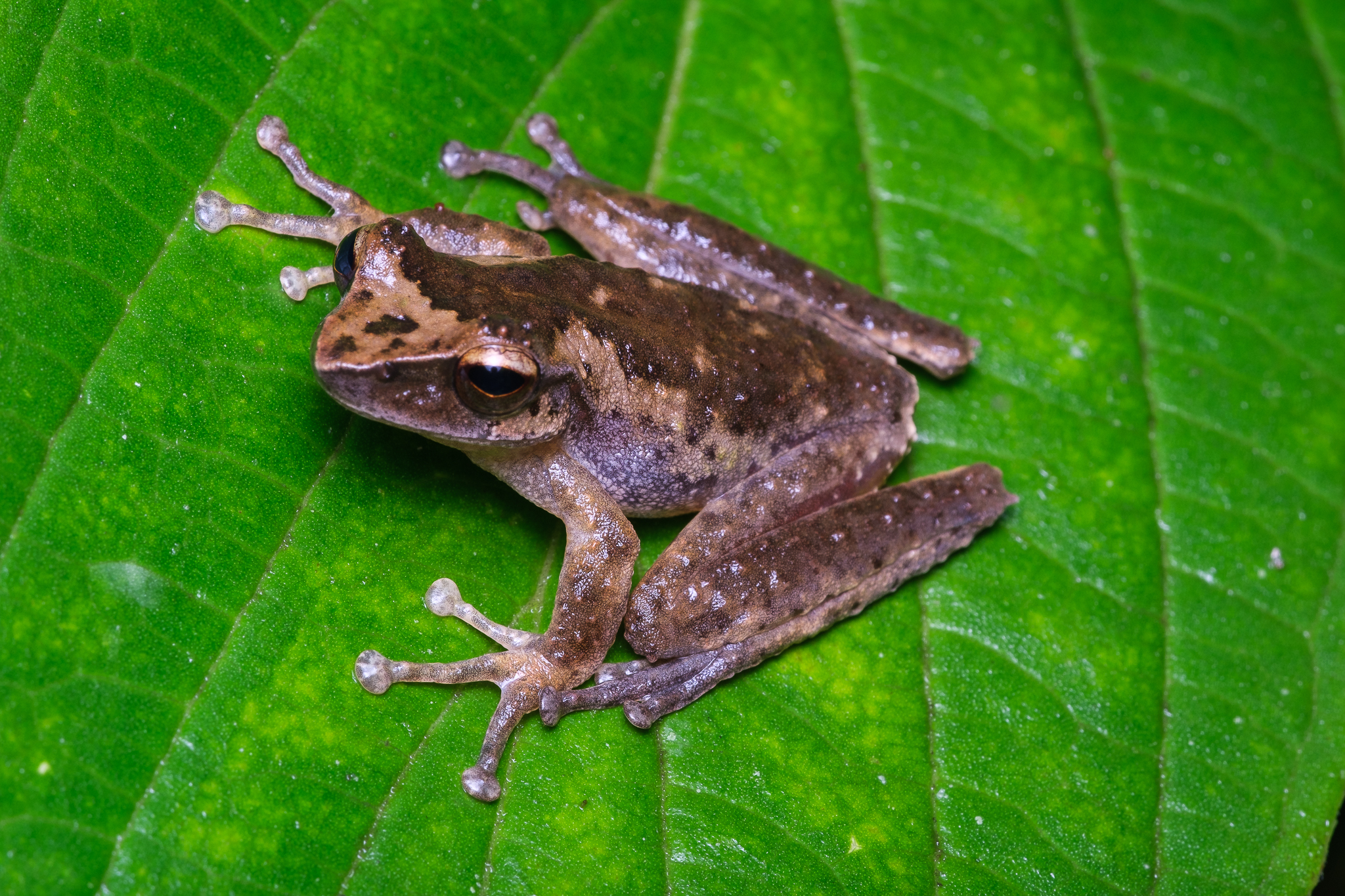

Conservation status
- Least Concern (IUCN 3.1)

Scientific classification
- Kingdom: Animalia
- Phylum: Chordata
- Class: Amphibia
- Order: Anura
- Family: Pelodryadidae
- Genus: Amnihyla
- Species: A. arfakiana

Binomial name
- Amnihyla arfakiana (Peters & Doria, 1878)

Synonyms
- Litoria arfakiana (Peters & Doria, 1878)

= Arfakiana tree frog =

Species of amphibian

The Arfakiana tree frog (Amnihyla arfakiana) is a species of frog in the family Pelodryadidae. It is found in New Guinea.

== Distribution and habitat ==
Its natural habitats are subtropical or tropical moist lowland forests, subtropical or tropical moist montane forests, rivers, and heavily degraded former forest.

In the Upper Kaironk Valley of Madang Province, Papua New Guinea, it is frequently found in Phragmites karka reed beds and among Miscanthus cane.

It is threatened by habitat loss.
