= Exochohyla hilli =

Conservation status
- Least Concern (IUCN 3.1)

Scientific classification
- Kingdom: Animalia
- Phylum: Chordata
- Class: Amphibia
- Order: Anura
- Family: Pelodryadidae
- Genus: Exochohyla
- Species: E. hilli

Binomial name
- Exochohyla hilli (Hiaso and Richards, 2006)

Synonyms
- Litoria rostandi Kraus, 2007; Litoria hilli Hiaso and Richards, 2006

Species of frog

Exochohyla hilli is a species of frog in the family Pelodryadidae. It is endemic to the Tagula Island of Papua New Guinea.
