= Amnihyla brongersmai =

Conservation status
- Least Concern (IUCN 3.1)

Scientific classification
- Kingdom: Animalia
- Phylum: Chordata
- Class: Amphibia
- Order: Anura
- Family: Pelodryadidae
- Genus: Amnihyla
- Species: A. brongersmai

Binomial name
- Amnihyla brongersmai (Loveridge, 1945)

Synonyms
- Hyla brongersmai (Loveridge, 1945); Litoria brongersmai (Loveridge, 1945); Dryopsophus brongersmai (Loveridge, 1945); Ranoidea brongersmai (Loveridge, 1945)

Species of amphibian

Amnihyla brongersmai is a species of frog in the subfamily Pelodryadinae. It is endemic to New Guinea and known from its type locality in the Snow Mountains (Panara Valley near Mount Doorman Top), and according to the IUCN Red List of Threatened Species, from another location in the Wapoga River headwaters some 100 km further west. Both sites are in Western New Guinea (Indonesia). Its range is probably broader than current knowledge suggests. The specific name brongersmai honours Leo Brongersma, a Dutch author and zoologist. Accordingly, the common name Brongersma's treefrog has been proposed for it.

== Description ==
The type series consists of three adult males measuring about 24 mm (0.9 in) in snout–vent length. The head is moderately flattened and longer than it is wide. The snout is rounded and not prominent. The tympanum is visible; the supratympanic fold is curved and conspicuous. The fingers are short, have narrow lateral fringes, and partial webbing. The toes are more heavily webbed. Preserved specimens are intensely dark brown above. The throat and chest are dull cream with a broad, brown mandibular border. Males have a subgular vocal sac.

== Habitat and conservation ==
Amnihyla brongersmai occurs on low vegetation along torrential mountain streams in submontane rainforest at elevations above 1,000 m (3,300 ft). It is most often active at night. The known locations are in closed forest. Breed is presumed to place in streams. There are no known threats to this species, which appeared to be common at the more recently discovered location.
