= Amnihyla rivicola =

Conservation status
- Least Concern (IUCN 3.1)

Scientific classification
- Kingdom: Animalia
- Phylum: Chordata
- Class: Amphibia
- Order: Anura
- Family: Pelodryadidae
- Genus: Amnihyla
- Species: A. rivicola

Binomial name
- Amnihyla rivicola Günther and Richards, 2005

Synonyms
- Ranoidea rivicola (Günther and Richards, 2005); Dryopsophus rivicola (Günther and Richards, 2005); Litoria rivicola (Günther and Richards, 2005)

Species of frog

Amnihyla rivicola is a frog in the subfamily Pelodryadinae, endemic to Indonesia. Scientists have observed this frog in Papua Province, about 750 meters above sea level.
