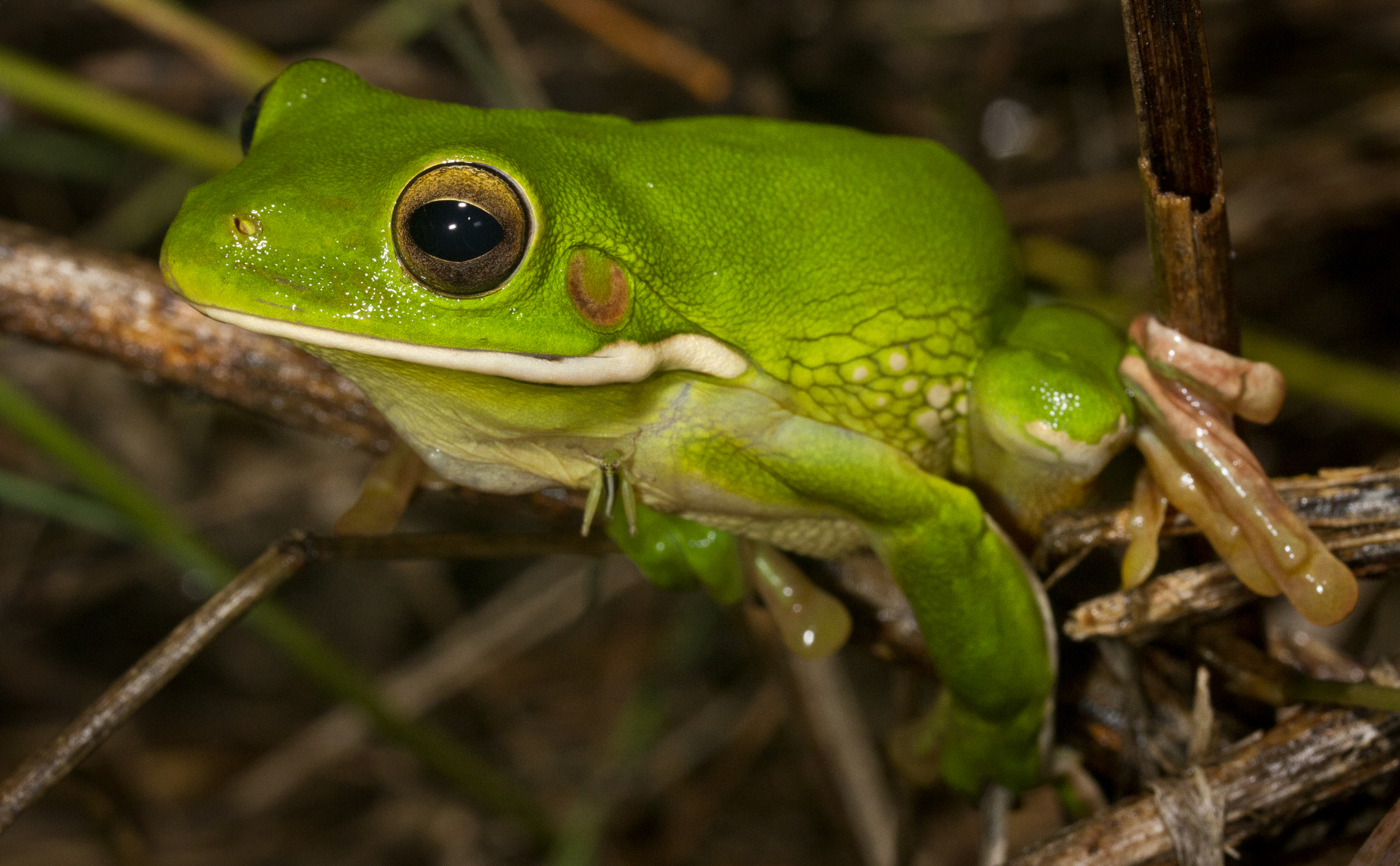
- White-lipped tree frog (Sandyrana infrafrenata)

Scientific classification
- Kingdom: Animalia
- Phylum: Chordata
- Class: Amphibia
- Order: Anura
- Family: Pelodryadidae
- Genus: Sandyrana; Wells and Wellington, 1985

Species
- See text

= Sandyrana =

Genus of amphibians

Sandyrana is a genus of arboreal frogs in the family Pelodryadidae. These frogs are native to north-eastern Australia, New Guinea and its surrounding islands, the Bismarck Archipelago, Admiralty Archipelago and eastern Indonesia (with the white-lipped tree frog introduced into Java. Species in the genus were previously included within Nyctimystes the wastebasket genus Litoria, but were placed into the resurrected genus Sandyrana after a comprehensive phylogenetic study in 2025.

Species within Sandyrana range from medium-sized to very large: the white-lipped tree frog is often considered the largest tree frog in Australia.

The genus is named after Sandy Ingleby of Sydney and the Latin for frog (rana).

== Species ==
Sandyrana contains 14 species:

Common name	Binomial name
Azure-thighed treefrog	Sandyrana azuroscelis (Günther, Richards, Hamidy, Trilaksono, Sulaeman, and Oliver, 2023)
	Sandyrana dux (Richards and Oliver, 2006)
Northern New Guinea Treefrog	Sandyrana graminea (Boulenger, 1905)
	Sandyrana hunti (Richards, Oliver, Dahl, and Tjaturadi, 2006)
White-lipped tree frog	Sandyrana infrafrenata (Günther, 1867)
Lubis's tree frog	Sandyrana lubisi (Oliver, Günther, Tjaturadi, and Richards, 2021)
Multi-coloured tree frog	Sandyrana multicolor (Günther, 2004)
	Sandyrana nullicedens (Kraus, 2018)
	Sandyrana pallidofemora (Kraus, 2018)
Parachuting frog	Sandyrana pterodactyla (Oliver, Richards, and Donnellan, 2019)
	Sandyrana purpureolata (Oliver, Richards, Tjaturadi, and Iskandar, 2007)
Sabang tree frog	Sandyrana sanguinolenta (Van Kampen, 1909)
	Sandyrana sauroni (Richards and Oliver, 2006)
	Sandyrana tenuigranulata (Boettger, 1895)
