= Dipsas pratti =

Conservation status
- Least Concern (IUCN 3.1)

Scientific classification
- Kingdom: Animalia
- Phylum: Chordata
- Class: Reptilia
- Order: Squamata
- Suborder: Serpentes
- Family: Colubridae
- Genus: Dipsas
- Species: D. pratti

Binomial name
- Dipsas pratti (Boulenger, 1897)

Synonyms
- Leptognathus pratti Boulenger, 1897; Dipsas pratti — J. Peters, 1960

Species of snake

Dipsas pratti, known commonly as Pratt's snail-eater, is a species of arboreal snake in the subfamily Dipsadinae of the family Colubridae. The species is endemic to northern South America.

== Etymology ==
The specific name, pratti, is in honor of British naturalist Antwerp Edgar Pratt.

== Geographic range ==
D. pratti is found in Colombia and Venezuela.

== Biology ==
Very few examples of D. pratti have been studied, and the first photograph of a live example of this species was not published until 2012.
