= Sandyrana sauroni =

Conservation status
- Least Concern (IUCN 3.1)

Scientific classification
- Kingdom: Animalia
- Phylum: Chordata
- Class: Amphibia
- Order: Anura
- Family: Pelodryadidae
- Genus: Sandyrana
- Species: S. sauroni

Binomial name
- Sandyrana sauroni (Richards and Oliver, 2006)

Synonyms
- Litoria sauroni Richards and Oliver, 2006; Dryopsophus sauroni (Richards and Oliver, 2006); Ranoidea sauroni (Richards and Oliver, 2006); Nyctimystes sauroni (Richards and Oliver, 2006)

Species of amphibian

Sandyrana sauroni is a species of tree frog and an endemic to Papua New Guinea Scientifically, it is in the subfamily Pelodryadinae. Scientists know it solely from the Kikori Integrate Conservation and Development Project area.

== Taxonomy ==
The species epithet sauroni refers to the red and black mottled eye of The Lord of the Rings character Sauron.

== Description ==
This frog has red-and-black eyes and nuptial pads on its front feet.
