= Exochohyla humboldtorum =

Conservation status
- Least Concern (IUCN 3.1)

Scientific classification
- Kingdom: Animalia
- Phylum: Chordata
- Class: Amphibia
- Order: Anura
- Family: Pelodryadidae
- Genus: Exochohyla
- Species: E. humboldtorum

Binomial name
- Exochohyla humboldtorum Günther, 2006)

Synonyms
- Litoria humboldtorum Günther, 2006

Species of frog

Exochohyla humboldtorum is a species of frog in the family Pelodryadidae. It is endemic to the Papua Province of Indonesia, and found on Yapen Island (its type locality) as well as on the foothills of the Foja Mountains in the mainland New Guinea. The specific name refers to Alexander von Humboldt, Wilhelm von Humboldt, Humboldt University of Berlin, and its Museum für Naturkunde.

== Description ==
Males measure 41–47 mm (1.6–1.9 in) in snout–vent length. The snout bears a conspicuous dermal spike. The tympanum is small but prominent. Fingers are long, extensively webbed, and with large terminal discs. Dorsal colour varies and can be light blue-grey, greenish, brownish, or a mixture of greenish and brownish. There are blackish or brownish markings which, together with crenulated fringes on extremities and skin lappets on margin of lower jaw, contribute to camouflage of resting individuals.

The male advertisement call typically consists of three notes, one long note with several subnotes, and two short notes, without subnotes. Dominant frequency is about 1800 Hz. Calling starts at dusk and lasts until at least midnight.

== Habitat and conservation ==
Exochohyla humboldtorum inhabits primary tropical moist forest, but it can also be found in partly logged and regenerating areas of forest. These frogs are typically found near water or road margins, perched on vegetation 2–6 m above the ground. The altitudinal range is 500 to 1,050 m (1,640 to 3,440 ft) asl.

Exochohyla humboldtorum is an uncommon species, but it appears to be reasonably adaptable, and no threats have been identified.
