= Sandyrana hunti =

Conservation status
- Data Deficient (IUCN 3.1)

Scientific classification
- Kingdom: Animalia
- Phylum: Chordata
- Class: Amphibia
- Order: Anura
- Family: Pelodryadidae
- Genus: Sandyrana
- Species: S. hunti

Binomial name
- Sandyrana hunti (Richards, Oliver, Dahl, and Tjaturadi, 2006)

Synonyms
- Litoria hunti Richards, Oliver, Dahl, and Tjaturadi, 2006; Litoria huntorum Richards, Oliver, Dahl, and Tjaturadi, 2006

Species of frog

Sandyrana hunti is a species of tree frog in the family Pelodryadidae. It is endemic to northern Papua New Guinea. Scientists have seen it only in Utai, Sanduan Province, but predict that also lives elsewhere on New Guinea.

The adult male frog has nuptial pads on its feet and is 57.9–60.4 mm long in snout-vent length. It is bright green on the dorsum and sometimes has a white stripe from its jaw to its tympanum. The climbing discs on its feet are white. It has vomerine teeth in its upper jaw.

Its front feet are fully webbed and its call is deep and guttural in quality.

As this frog was heard calling from the trees 5 to 8 meters above the ground, it is considered likely that it lays eggs in pools on the forest floor.
