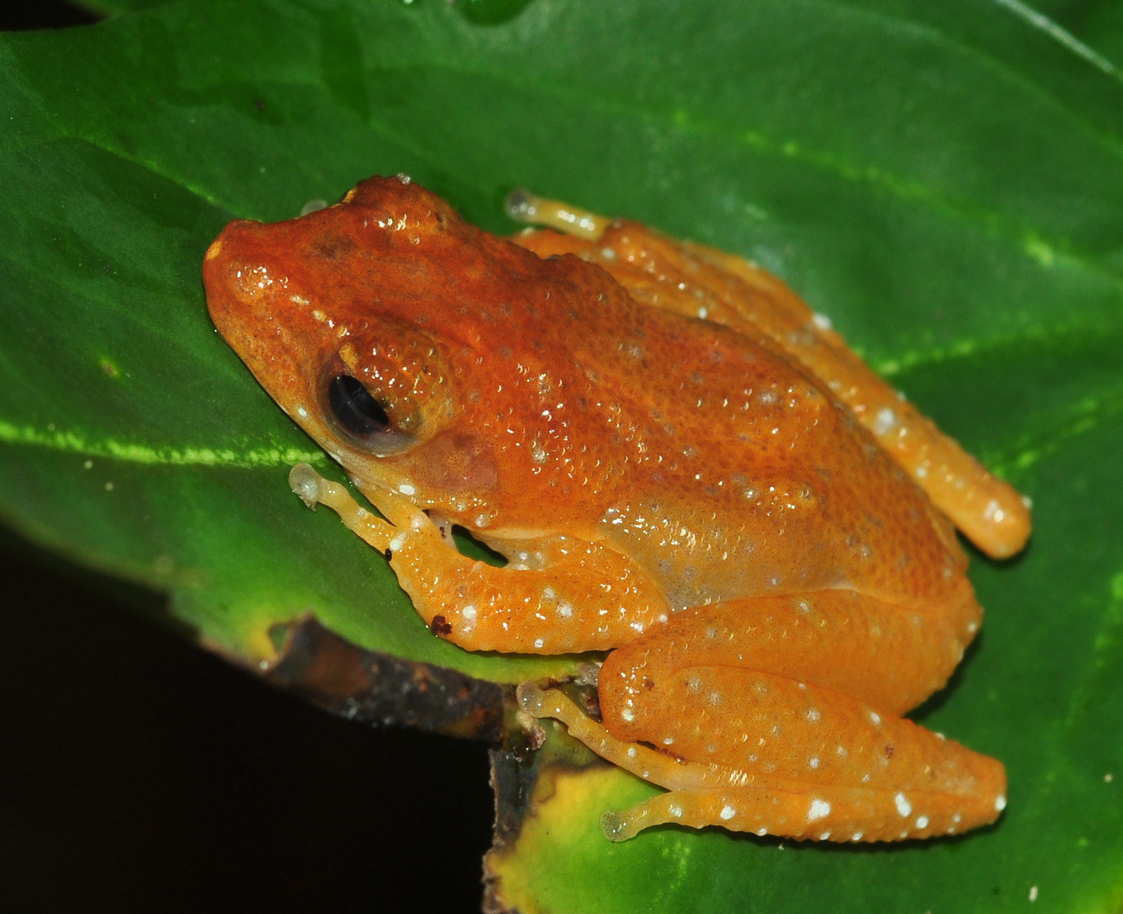

Conservation status
- Least Concern (IUCN 3.1)

Scientific classification
- Kingdom: Animalia
- Phylum: Chordata
- Class: Amphibia
- Order: Anura
- Family: Rhacophoridae
- Genus: Nyctixalus
- Species: N. pictus

Binomial name
- Nyctixalus pictus (Peters, 1871)

Synonyms
- Ixalus pictus Peters, 1871; Rhacophorus anodon van Kampen, 1907; Philautus pictus (Peters, 1871); Philautus anodon (van Kampen, 1907); Rhacophorus (Philautus) anodon (van Kampen, 1907); Rhacophorus (Philautus) pictus (Peters, 1871); Hazelia picta (Peters, 1871); Philautus pictus pictus (Peters, 1871); Hazelia anodon (van Kampen, 1907); Nyctixalus anodon (van Kampen, 1907); Edwardtayloria picta (Peters, 1871); Theloderma (Nyctixalus) pictum (Peters, 1871)

= Nyctixalus pictus =

Species of amphibian

Nyctixalus pictus, also known as cinnamon frog, cinnamon treefrog, cinnamon bush frog, painted Indonesian treefrog, and white-spotted treefrog, etc., is a species of frog in the family Rhacophoridae. It is found in the Malay Peninsula (including southernmost Thailand), the Philippines, and parts of the Greater Sunda Islands (northern Borneo and northern Sumatra).

== Distribution ==
This species is found in the Malay Peninsula (from extreme southern Thailand through Peninsular Malaysia to Singapore), Sumatra (Indonesia), Borneo (Brunei, Malaysia, and Indonesia), and the Philippines.

== Description ==
Nyctixalus pictus grows to about 35 mm (1.4 in) in snout–vent length; males are slightly smaller than females. The snout is pointed. The tympanum is distinct. The limbs are long and the finger and toe tips are dilated into large discs. The fingers have no webbing whereas the toes are partly webbed. Coloration is brown or reddish brown with white to yellow spots on the body.

== Habitat and conservation ==
Nyctixalus pictus occurs in the shrub and lower tree layers of primary and secondary forests at elevations below 700 m (2,300 ft) (up to 1,650 m (5,410 ft) in Borneo). The tadpoles develop in arboreal water-filled cavities (including phytotelms) and in rotting logs.

Nyctixalus pictus is widespread but uncommon. Populations are threatened by habitat loss due to clearing of forests for agriculture and logging. Its range includes several protected areas. In Singapore, it is only found in the Bukit Timah and Central Catchment Nature Reserves.
