= Nasutibatrachus pronimius =

Conservation status
- Least Concern (IUCN 3.1)

Scientific classification
- Kingdom: Animalia
- Phylum: Chordata
- Class: Amphibia
- Order: Anura
- Family: Pelodryadidae
- Genus: Nasutibatrachus
- Species: N. pronimius

Binomial name
- Nasutibatrachus pronimius (Menzies, 1993)

Synonyms
- Litoria pronimia Menzies, 1993

Species of frog

Nasutibatrachus pronimius is a species of frog in the family Pelodryadidae. It is found in New Guinea. Its natural habitats are subtropical or tropical moist lowland forests, subtropical or tropical moist montane forests, swamps, freshwater marshes, intermittent freshwater marshes, and canals and ditches. It is threatened by habitat loss.
