= Amnihyla spinifera =

Conservation status
- Least Concern (IUCN 3.1)

Scientific classification
- Kingdom: Animalia
- Phylum: Chordata
- Class: Amphibia
- Order: Anura
- Family: Pelodryadidae
- Genus: Amnihyla
- Species: A. spinifera

Binomial name
- Amnihyla spinifera (Tyler, 1968)

Synonyms
- Litoria spinifera (Tyler, 1968); Ranoidea spinifera (Tyler, 1968)

Species of amphibian

Amnihyla spinifera is a species of frog in the subfamily Pelodryadinae. It is sometimes called spiny tree frog, but that can also refer to Nyctixalus spinosus of the Philippines. It is endemic to Papua New Guinea. Its natural habitats are subtropical or tropical moist lowland forests, subtropical or tropical moist montane forests, rivers, rural gardens, and heavily degraded former forests.
