= Trauna River tree frog =

Conservation status
- Least Concern (IUCN 3.1)

Scientific classification
- Kingdom: Animalia
- Phylum: Chordata
- Class: Amphibia
- Order: Anura
- Family: Pelodryadidae
- Genus: Amnihyla
- Species: A. oenicolen

Binomial name
- Amnihyla oenicolen Menzies & Zweifel, 1974

Synonyms
- Litoria oenicolen (Menzies & Zweifel, 1974)

Species of amphibian

The Trauna River tree frog (Amnihyla oenicolen) is a species of frog in the subfamily Pelodryadinae, endemic to Papua New Guinea. Its natural habitats are subtropical or tropical moist montane forests and rivers.
