= Exochohyla chrisdahli =

Conservation status
- Least Concern (IUCN 3.1)

Scientific classification
- Kingdom: Animalia
- Phylum: Chordata
- Class: Amphibia
- Order: Anura
- Family: Pelodryadidae
- Genus: Exochohyla
- Species: E. chrisdahli

Binomial name
- Exochohyla chrisdahli Richards, 2007

Synonyms
- Litoria chrisdahli Richards, 2007

Species of amphibian

Exochohyla chrisdahli is a species of frog in the family Pelodryadidae. It is endemic to Papua New Guinea.
