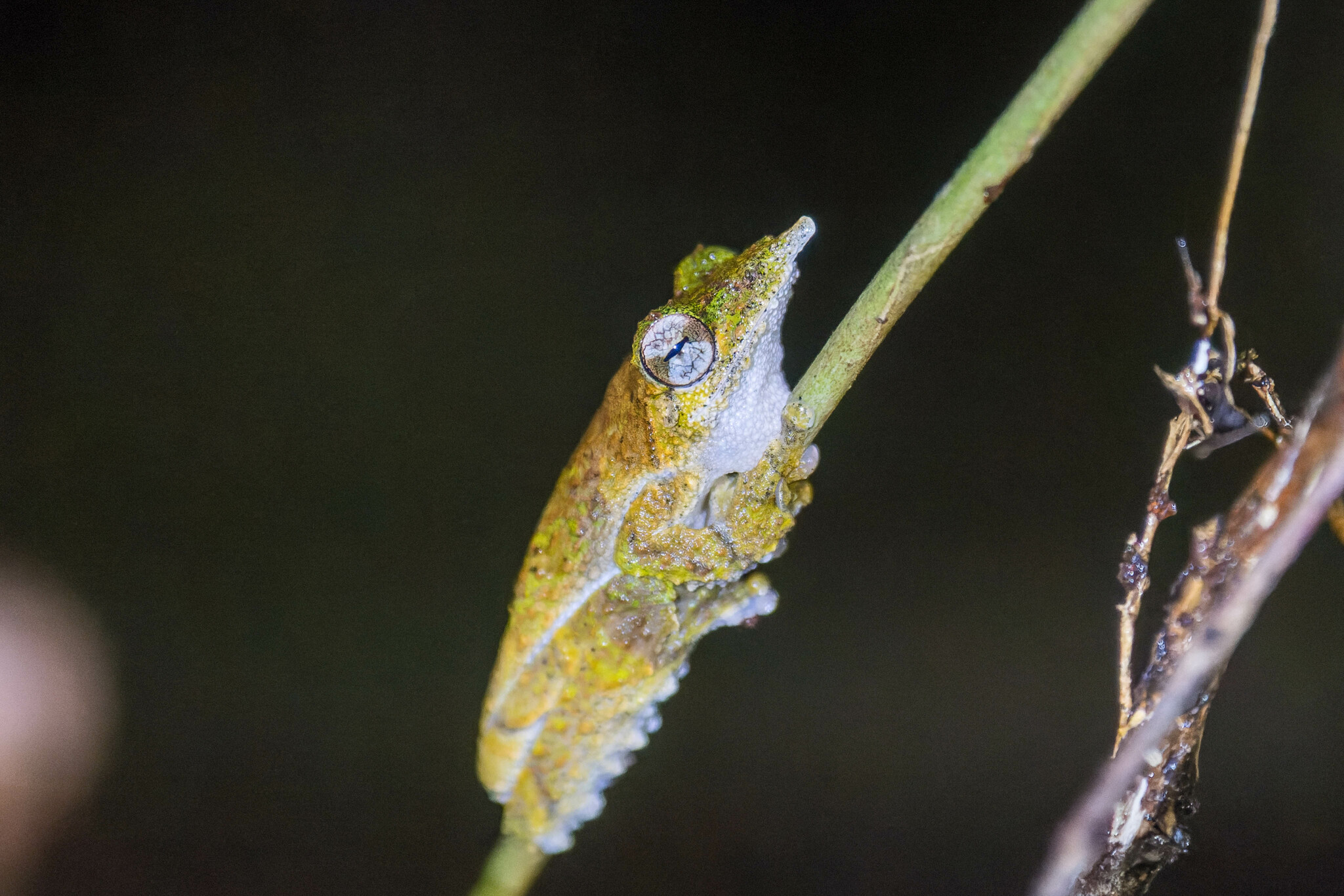

Conservation status
- Least Concern (IUCN 3.1)

Scientific classification
- Kingdom: Animalia
- Phylum: Chordata
- Class: Amphibia
- Order: Anura
- Family: Pelodryadidae
- Genus: Exochohyla
- Species: E. prora

Binomial name
- Exochohyla prora (Menzies, 1969)

Synonyms
- Litoria prora ()

= Efogi tree frog =

Species of amphibian

The Efogi tree frog (Exochohyla prora) is a species of frog in the family Pelodryadidae. It is found in New Guinea.

Its natural habitats are subtropical or tropical moist lowland forests, subtropical or tropical moist montane forests, rivers, freshwater marshes, intermittent freshwater marshes, rural gardens, and heavily degraded former forest. It is threatened by habitat loss.
