= Hylophorbus richardsi =

Conservation status
- Least Concern (IUCN 3.1)

Scientific classification
- Kingdom: Animalia
- Phylum: Chordata
- Class: Amphibia
- Order: Anura
- Family: Microhylidae
- Genus: Hylophorbus
- Species: H. richardsi

Binomial name
- Hylophorbus richardsi Günther, 2001

Species of frog

Hylophorbus richardsi is a species of frog in the family Microhylidae.

It is endemic to Papua New Guinea. Its natural habitat is subtropical or tropical moist montane forests.
