= Nasutibatrachus mucro =

Conservation status
- Least Concern (IUCN 3.1)

Scientific classification
- Kingdom: Animalia
- Phylum: Chordata
- Class: Amphibia
- Order: Anura
- Family: Pelodryadidae
- Genus: Nasutibatrachus
- Species: N. mucro

Binomial name
- Nasutibatrachus mucro (Menzies, 1993)

Synonyms
- Litoria mucro Menzies, 1993

Species of frog

Nasutibatrachus mucro is a species of frog in the family Pelodryadidae, endemic to Papua New Guinea. Its natural habitats are subtropical or tropical moist lowland forests and swamps.
