= Nasutibatrachus mareku =

Conservation status
- Data Deficient (IUCN 3.1)

Scientific classification
- Kingdom: Animalia
- Phylum: Chordata
- Class: Amphibia
- Order: Anura
- Family: Pelodryadidae
- Genus: Nasutibatrachus
- Species: N. mareku

Binomial name
- Nasutibatrachus mareku (Günther, 2008)

Synonyms
- Litoria mareku Günther, 2008

Species of amphibian

Mareku's tree frog (Nasutibatrachus mareku) is a species of frog in the family Pelodryadidae. It is endemic to Indonesia, where scientists have only seen it in the Wondiwoi Mountains in Papua Province.

== Taxonomy ==
Nasutibatrachus mareku is named after the collector of the two holotypes and who guided the scientists on their studies in the Wondiwoi Mountains: Genus Mareku, from Yeretuar village.

== Description ==
The two adult male holotypes were 25.5 and 26.5 mm long in snout-urostyle length with smooth dorsal skin. This frog is green and gray in color with a black mark in front of both eyes and a black band across its body. Its belly, chest, and throat are light in color, with yellow color on the sides of its body. The insides of its hind legs are blue. There are spots on the sides of its throat and body.

== Distribution and habitat ==
This species lives in the Wandammen Peninsula in primary rainforest. The two frogs in the original description were found in shrubs not far from a stream and swamp.
