= Hyalotos richardsi =

Conservation status
- Least Concern (IUCN 3.1)

Scientific classification
- Kingdom: Animalia
- Phylum: Chordata
- Class: Amphibia
- Order: Anura
- Family: Pelodryadidae
- Genus: Hyalotos
- Species: H. richardsi

Binomial name
- Hyalotos richardsi (Dennis and Cunningham, 2006)

Synonyms
- Litoria richardsi Dennis & Cunningham, 2006

Species of amphibian

Hyalotos richardsi is a species of frog in the family Pelodryadidae, endemic to Papua New Guinea and Indonesia. Scientists have seen it about 80 metres (260 feet) above sea level.

The adult male frog measures approximately 26.5 mm in snout-vent length and the adult female frog 29.5 mm. The webbed skin of the front and hind limbs is black in color. The belly is black, white, and yellow in color. The outermost part of the tympanum is clear. Scientists are not sure how this frog is related to other species in Litoria.
