= Amnihyla macki =

Conservation status
- Least Concern (IUCN 3.1)

Scientific classification
- Kingdom: Animalia
- Phylum: Chordata
- Class: Amphibia
- Order: Anura
- Family: Pelodryadidae
- Genus: Amnihyla
- Species: A. macki

Binomial name
- Amnihyla macki (Richards, 2001)

Synonyms
- Litoria macki Richards, 2001; Ranoidea macki (Richards, 2001)

Species of frog

Amnihyla macki is a species of frog in the subfamily Pelodryadinae, endemic to West Papua, Indonesia. Its natural habitats are subtropical or tropical moist lowland forests, subtropical or tropical moist montane forests, and rivers.
