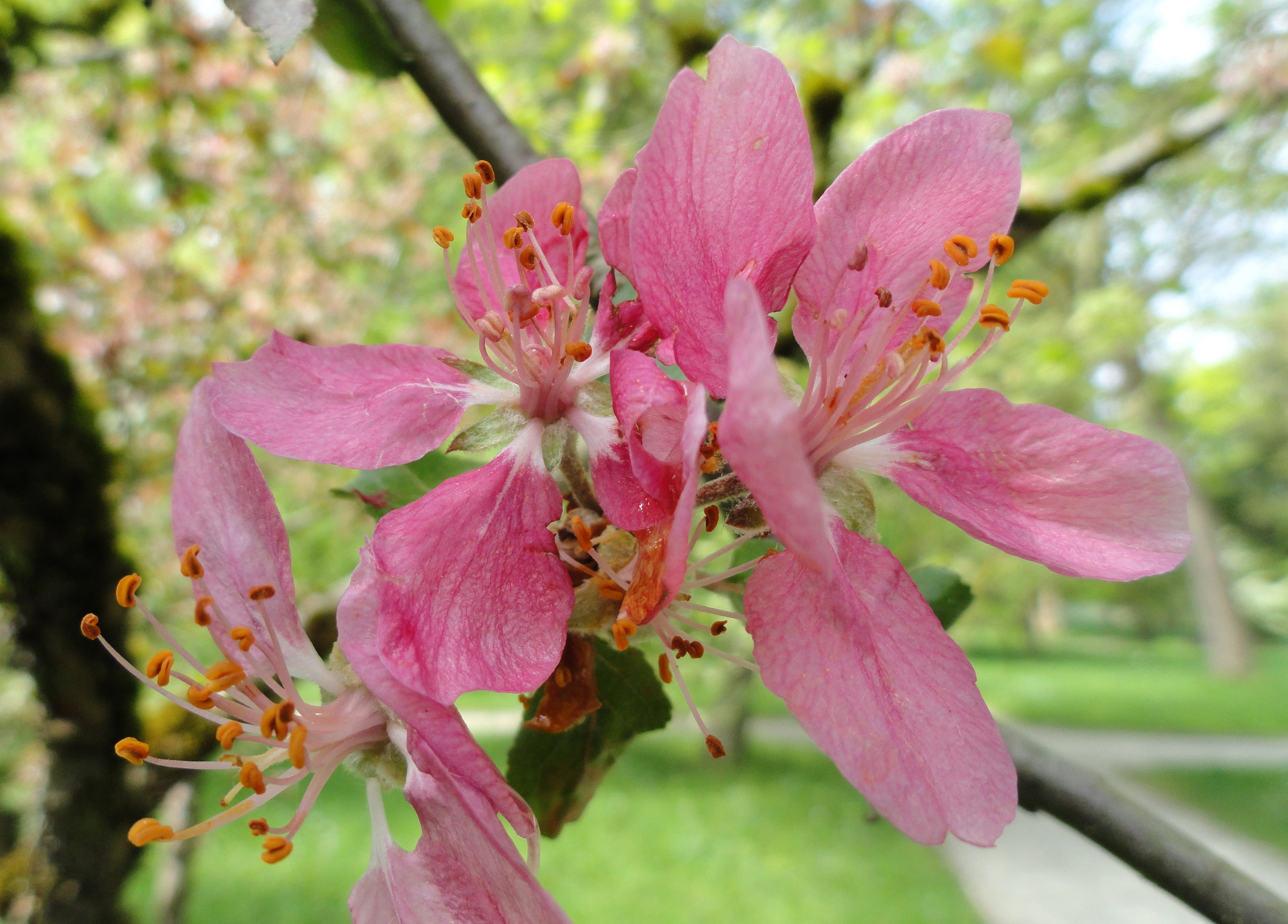

Conservation status
- Data Deficient (IUCN 3.1)

Scientific classification
- Kingdom: Plantae
- Clade: Tracheophytes
- Clade: Angiosperms
- Clade: Eudicots
- Clade: Rosids
- Order: Rosales
- Family: Rosaceae
- Genus: Malus
- Species: M. prattii

Binomial name
- Malus prattii (Hemsl.) C.K.Schneid.

Synonyms
- Docyniopsis prattii (Hemsl.) Koidz.; Prameles prattii (Hemsl.) Rushforth; Pyrus prattii Hemsl.; Malus prattii var. glabrata G.Z.Qian

= Malus prattii =

Species of apple tree

Malus prattii (Pratt's crabapple, 西蜀海棠 xi shu hai tang) is a species of crabapple in the family Rosaceae. It is endemic to China, being indigenous to Guangdong, Guizhou, west Sichuan, and northwest Yunnan provinces.

It grows to 10 metres (33 ft) in height, with flowers 1.5–2 centimetres (1/2–3/4 in) in diameter. It has alternate, simple leaves that emerge as red to maroon in color and turn dark green as they mature.
