= Teretistes havina =

Conservation status
- Least Concern (IUCN 3.1)

Scientific classification
- Kingdom: Animalia
- Phylum: Chordata
- Class: Amphibia
- Order: Anura
- Family: Pelodryadidae
- Genus: Teretistes
- Species: T. havina

Binomial name
- Teretistes havina Menzies, 1993

Species of frog

Teretistes havina is a species of frog in the family Pelodryadidae. It is found in New Guinea.

Its natural habitats are subtropical or tropical moist lowland forests, subtropical or tropical swamps, subtropical or tropical moist montane forests, rivers, freshwater marshes, intermittent freshwater marshes, heavily degraded former forests, and canals and ditches.

It is threatened by habitat loss.

== Description ==
Teretistes havina emits a whistling call of one long and two short notes. Males have a fleshy nose spike.

== Habitat and ecology ==
Teretistes havina resides in swamps in tropical forests. It breeds in stagnant pools. Eggs are laid in clusters of 3–18 on leaves between 0.8–1.8 metres (2.6–5.9 ft) above the water. Freshly laid eggs are 2.5 millimetres (0.098 in) in diameter and are greenish-white in color. As the embryo develops, the eggs turn brown and when the eggs hatch, the tadpoles drop into the water below. Upon reaching adulthood, many animals predate on them, such as birds, carnivorous mammals, snakes and some species of fish
