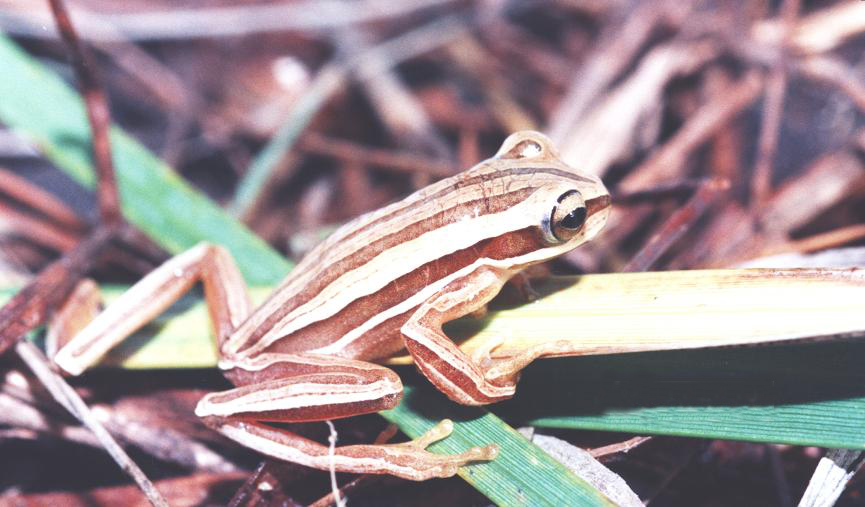

Conservation status
- Least Concern (IUCN 3.1)

Scientific classification
- Kingdom: Animalia
- Phylum: Chordata
- Class: Amphibia
- Order: Anura
- Family: Hylidae
- Genus: Boana
- Species: B. polytaenia

Binomial name
- Boana polytaenia (Cope, 1870)

Synonyms
- Hypsiboas polytaenius (Cope, 1870)

= Cope's eastern Paraguay tree frog =

Species of amphibian

Cope's eastern Paraguay tree frog (Boana polytaenia) is a species of frog in the family Hylidae endemic to Brazil. Its natural habitats are subtropical or tropical moist lowland forests, subtropical or tropical moist montane forests, rivers, intermittent rivers, freshwater marshes, intermittent freshwater marshes, arable land, pastureland, plantations, rural gardens, urban areas, heavily degraded former forests, ponds, irrigated land, and canals and ditches.
