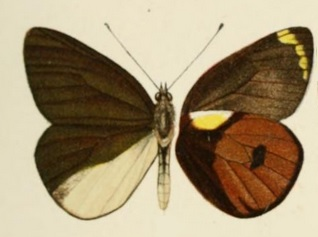

Scientific classification
- Kingdom: Animalia
- Phylum: Arthropoda
- Class: Insecta
- Order: Lepidoptera
- Family: Pieridae
- Genus: Delias
- Species: D. pratti

Binomial name
- Delias pratti Kenrick, 1909

= Delias pratti =

Species of butterfly

Delias pratti is a species of butterfly in the family Pieridae. The type was described by George Hamilton Kenrick in 1909. It is found in Papua New Guinea, the type location is the Foja Mountains.

The wingspan is about 50 mm. The forewings and hindwings are black, the forewings are without markings and the hindwings have an inner white area between the cell and inner margin and between the base and outer margin to vein four.

== See also ==
- Pieridae
- List of butterflies of Papua New Guinea
