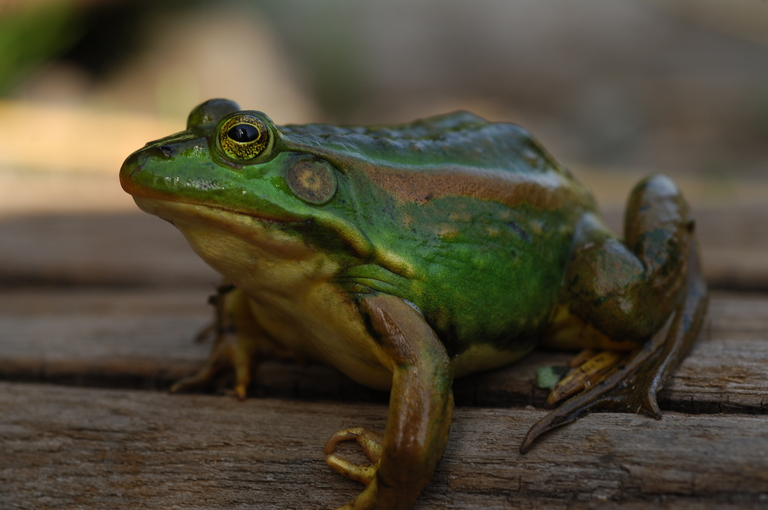

Conservation status
- Least Concern (IUCN 3.1)

Scientific classification
- Kingdom: Animalia
- Phylum: Chordata
- Class: Amphibia
- Order: Anura
- Family: Ranidae
- Genus: Pelophylax
- Species: P. plancyi

Binomial name
- Pelophylax plancyi (Lataste, 1880)
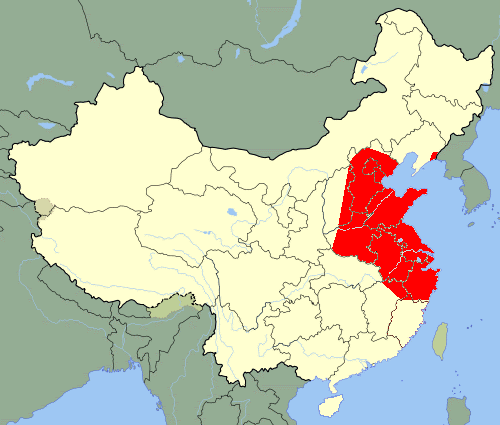

Synonyms
- Rana plancyi Lataste, 1880

= Eastern golden frog =

Species of amphibian

The eastern golden frog (Pelophylax plancyi) is a species of true frog found in eastern and northeastern China. It is closely related to the Seoul frog, Pelophylax chosenicus and to P. fukienensis, both initially described as subspecies of P. plancyi.

Eastern golden frog is a medium to large-sized frog, with males reaching 55 mm (2.2 in) and females 67 mm (2.6 in) length.
