= Eastern mountains tree frog =

Conservation status
- Least Concern (IUCN 3.1)

Scientific classification
- Kingdom: Animalia
- Phylum: Chordata
- Class: Amphibia
- Order: Anura
- Family: Pelodryadidae
- Genus: Amnihyla
- Species: A. dorsivena

Binomial name
- Amnihyla dorsivena (Tyler, 1968)

Synonyms
- Hyla dorsivena Tyler, 1968; Ranoidea dorsivena (Tyler, 1968); Dryopsophus dorsivenus (Tyler, 1968); Litoria dorsivena (Tyler, 1968)

Species of amphibian

The eastern mountains tree frog (Amnihyla dorsivena) is a species of frog in the subfamily Pelodryadinae. It is endemic to Papua New Guinea. Its natural habitats are subtropical or tropical moist montane forests and rivers.
