= Northern New Guinea tree frog =

Conservation status
- Least Concern (IUCN 3.1)

Scientific classification
- Kingdom: Animalia
- Phylum: Chordata
- Class: Amphibia
- Order: Anura
- Family: Pelodryadidae
- Genus: Sandyrana
- Species: S. graminea

Binomial name
- Sandyrana graminea (Boulenger, 1905)

Synonyms
- Hyla graminea (Boulenger, 1905); Litoria graminea (Boulenger, 1905); Nyctimystes gramineus (Boulenger, 1905)

Species of amphibian

The northern New Guinea tree frog (Sandyrana graminea) is a species of frog in the family Pelodryadidae. It is endemic to the Bird's Tail Peninsula. Its natural habitats are subtropical or tropical moist lowland forests and subtropical or tropical moist montane forests. It is threatened by habitat loss.
