= Steve Donnellan (scientist) =

Australian herpetologist

Stephen Charles Donnellan (born 1954) is the Chief Research Scientist of the Evolutionary Biology Unit at the South Australian Museum. He is also an Affiliate Professor at the University of Adelaide. Donnellan moved from New South Wales to South Australia in 1985 to undertake research recovering the evolutionary history of Australia's lizards. This work led to the establishment of a comprehensive collection of reptile and frog tissues from Australia and New Guinea. In 1990 Donnellan joined the South Australian Museum's staff and established the DNA laboratory there. His research since has focused on the evolution and biogeography of Australasian fauna. Donnellan has used molecular genetic methods to examine issues in the population genetics, phylogeography and phylogenetic relationships of vertebrates and selected invertebrate groups. Many of his research projects have been supported by the Australian Research Council (ARC). His work has been published in numerous scientific journals, including Biological Conservation, Evolution, International Journal for Parasitology, PLOS One, Restoration Ecology, Zoologica Scripta and Zootaxa.

== Giant Australian cuttlefish ==
In the 2000s, Donnellan studied Sepia apama, the Australian giant cuttlefish, in South Australian waters with Bronwyn Gillanders from the University of Adelaide. While analysing its population structure and movement patterns, he developed a fondness for the animal. He has described its mass breeding aggregation at Point Lowly near Whyalla as "a fantastic natural phenomenon." Donnellan ultimately determined that a genetically distinct population of the species exists, confined to the waters of Northern Spencer Gulf. In 2011, Donnellan expressed concern over the diminishing population forming the breeding aggregation at Point Lowly, and said that he believed constructing a new desalination plant nearby could have further adverse impacts.

== Education ==
Donnellan has a science degree with honours from the University of New South Wales (1976) and a PhD from Macquarie University (1985).

== Memberships ==
- Australian Society of Herpetologists
- Genetics Society of AustralAsia
- Society of Australian Systematic Biologists
- Society for the Study of Evolution
