= Paul M. Oliver =

Australian herpetologist

- Known for: Taxonomy and systematics of reptiles and amphibians
- Scientific career
- Fields: Herpetology
- Institutions: South Australian Museum
- Author abbrev. (zoology): Oliver

Paul M. Oliver is an Australian herpetologist who works at the South Australian Museum in Adelaide, Australia. He is known for his contributions to the taxonomy and systematics of reptiles and amphibians, particularly frogs and geckos from Australia and New Guinea.

== Selected taxa described ==
- Cophixalus misimae Richards & Oliver, 2007
- Diplodactylus calcicolus Hutchinson, Doughty & Oliver, 2009
- Diplodactylus wiru Hutchinson, Doughty & Oliver, 2009
- Hylophorbus rainerguentheri Richards & Oliver, 2007
- Litoria dux Richards & Oliver, 2006
- Litoria fuscula Oliver & Richards, 2007
- Litoria gasconi Richards, Oliver, Krey & Tjaturadi, 2009
- Litoria hunti Richards, Oliver, Dahl & Tjaturadi, 2006
- Litoria purpureolata Oliver, Richards, Tjaturadi & Iskandar, 2007
- Litoria robinsonae Oliver, Stuart-Fox & Richards, 2008
- Litoria sauroni Richards & Oliver, 2006
- Litoria spartacus Richards & Oliver, 2006
