= Stephen John Richards =

Australian herpetologist

Stephen J. Richards
- Born: Stephen John Richards
- Scientific career
- Fields: Herpetology
- Institutions: James Cook University, Department of Zoology

Stephen John Richards, often written as Stephen J. Richards, is an Australian herpetologist who works in the Department of Zoology at James Cook University. He is known for the discovery and description of dozens frog species from New Guinea and Australia. The Litoria richardsi, Hylophorbus richardsi are named in his honor

== Taxa named in his honour ==
- Litoria richardsi Dennis & Cunningham, 2006
- Hylophorbus richardsi Günther, 2001

== Taxa described ==
- Albericus tuberculus
- Asterophrys leucopus
- Callulops sagittatus
- Choerophryne allisoni
- Cophixalus monticola
- Litoria chrisdahli
- Litoria dux
- Litoria elkeae
- Litoria fuscula
- Litoria hilli
- Litoria hunti
- Litoria kuduki
- Litoria macki
- Litoria majikthise
- Litoria megalops
- Litoria oktediensis
- Litoria purpureolata
- Litoria rara
- Litoria rivicola
- Litoria robinsonae
- Litoria sauroni
- Litoria scabra
- Litoria singadanae
- Litoria spartacus
- Litoria wapogaensis
- Mixophyes carbinensis
- Mixophyes coggeri
- Oreophryne atrigularis
- Oreophryne minuta
- Oreophryne wapoga
