= Conondale National Park =

National park in Queensland, Australia

- IUCN category II (national park)
- Location within Queensland
- Location: Queensland
- Coordinates: 26°39′47″S 152°38′44″E
- Area: 368 km^{2} (142 sq mi)
- Established: 1977
- Governing body: Queensland Parks and Wildlife Service
- Website: www.nprsr.qld.gov.au/parks/conondale

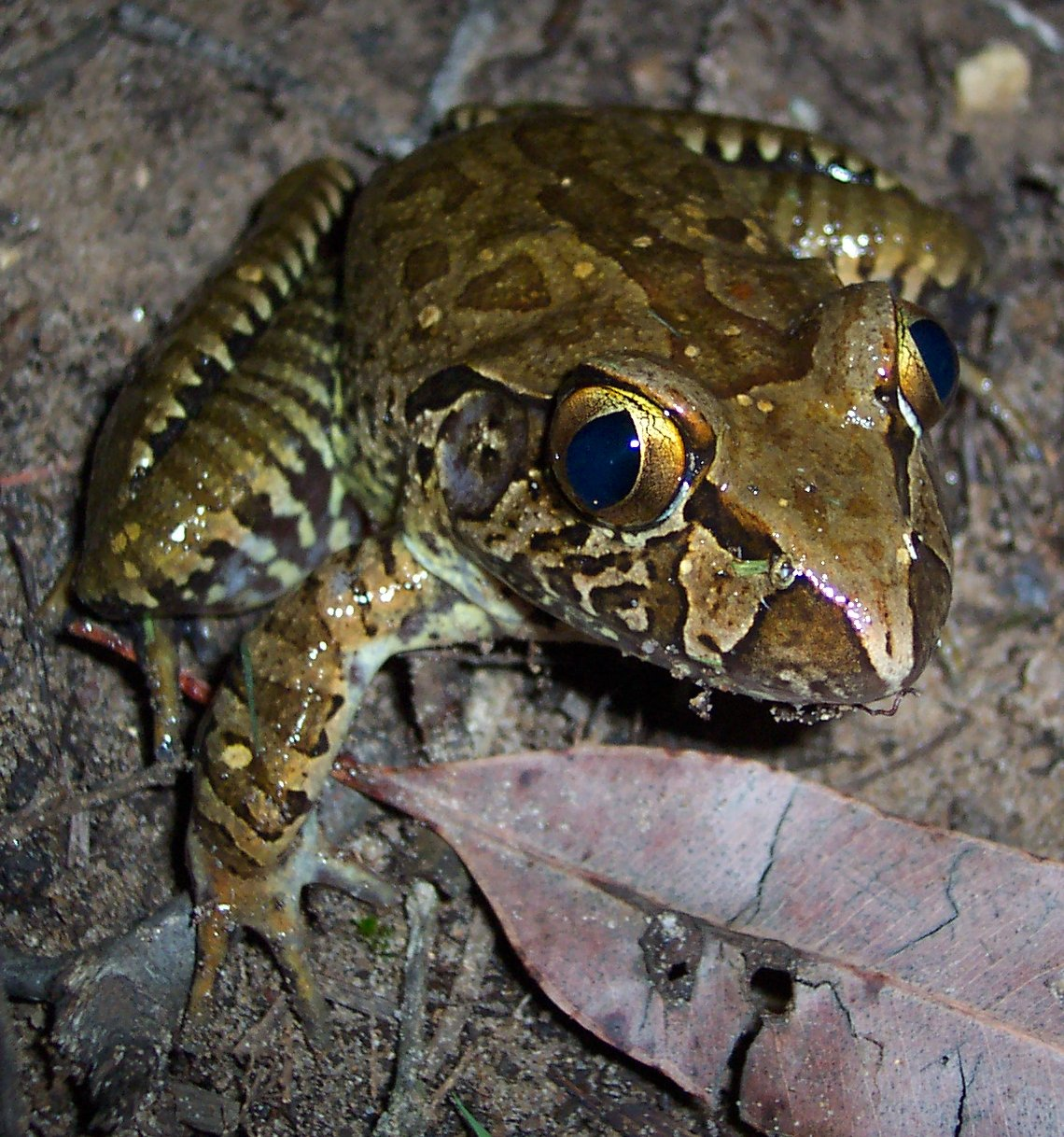
The endangered giant barred frog Mixophyes iteratus

Conondale National Park is 130 km north of Brisbane in the Sunshine Coast Hinterland near the town of Conondale in the south east Queensland bioregion. The park covers an area of 35,648 hectares protecting large areas of subtropical rainforest, woodlands, wet and dry sclerophyll forest including Queensland's tallest tree. The park contains areas of regenerating forest which have been previously logged; areas of forest plantations also border the park. The park is currently managed by the Queensland Government under the Nature Conservation Act 1992.

Since the 1860s the Conondale region has been impacted by land clearing for agriculture, mining and logging, today the park is a refuge for many species now rare and threatened. Threatened species such as the plumed frogmouth, giant barred frog, Conondale crayfish, spotted-tailed quoll, Gympie nut and richmond birdwing butterfly have been recorded in the park and are currently targeted for conservation management to mitigate threats to their survival. Species of interest include the southern gastric brooding frog which mysteriously disappeared in 1981 and is presumed extinct.

== Regional description ==
The landscape has a rugged topography with gorges, valleys and a number of mountains above 700 m with the highest peak being Mount Langley at 868m. Throughout the park there are scenic waterfalls such as Booloumba Creek Falls, cascades and numerous boulder strewn creeks. The Conondale range forms a catchment divide between the Brisbane River and Mary River with the southernmost tributaries of the Mary river forming in Booloumba and Yabba creek. The park also contains wetlands of national significance. These tributaries are important for the threatened Mary river cod which has declined in these creeks.

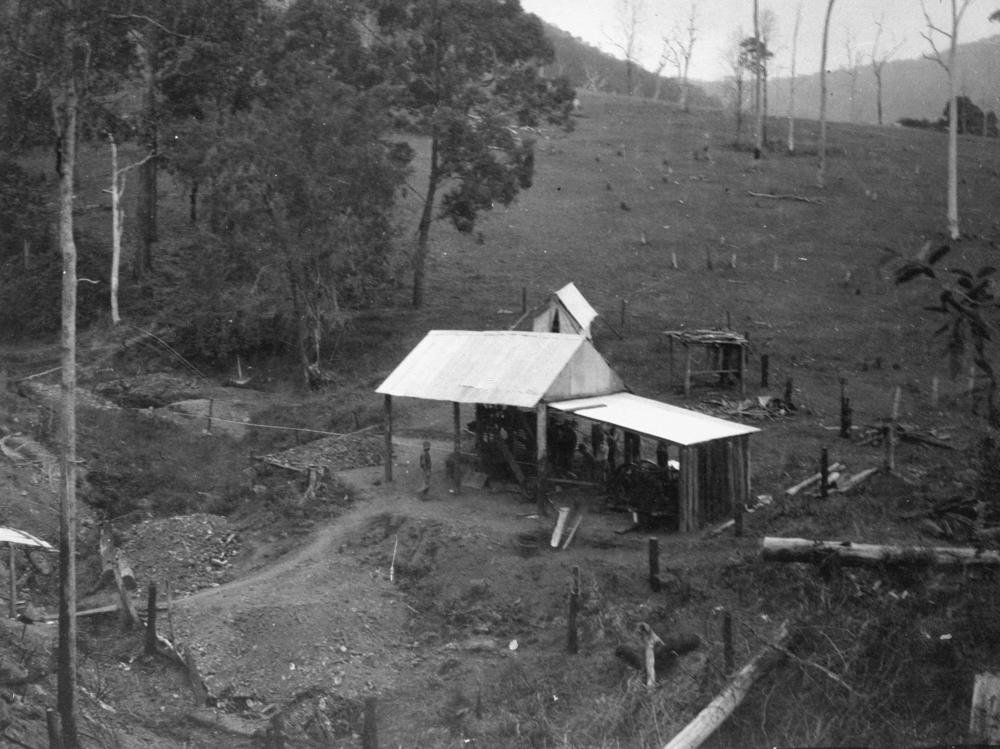
Gold mining at Kilcoy Creek, 1933

The region has a sub-tropical climate with a mean annual rainfall of 1,500 mm, the majority of rainfall occurs seasonally in summer (December–March) usually with heavy downpours and winters generally cold and dry with occasional frosts. Major vegetation types include a mix of complex notophyll vine forest, sub-tropical rainforest, woodlands, bangalow palm forests, wet sclerophyll and dry sclerophyll forest with rainforest occurring mainly at higher altitudes and along watercourses.

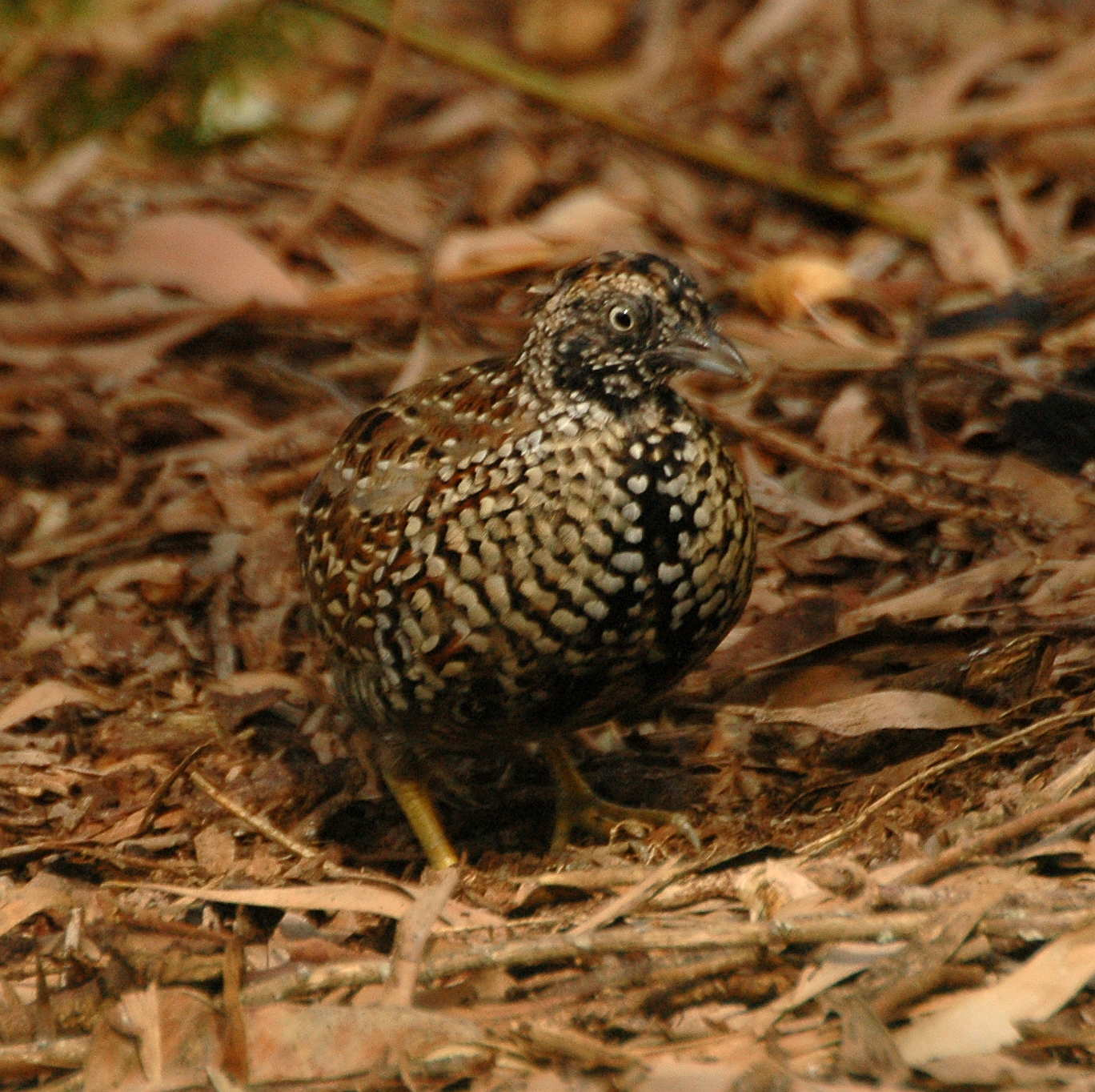
Black-breasted Button-quail Turnix melanogaster

== History ==
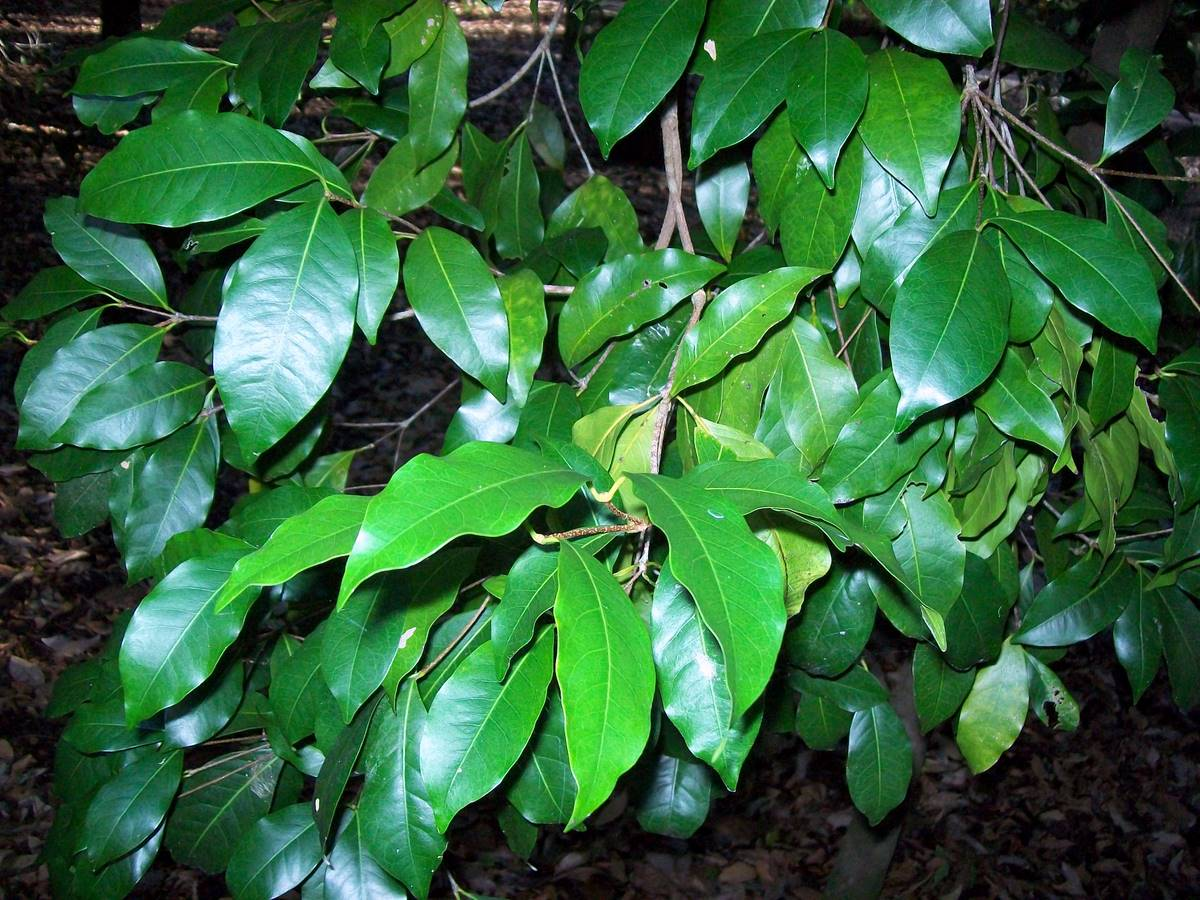
Vulnerable Three-leaved bosistoa Bosistoa transversa

The Conondale region served as an important area for both the Jinibara and Kabi Kabi traditional owners, it was an important pathway and resource gathering area for food such as the bunya pine Araucaria bidwillii which occurs in the park and remains culturally significant to Indigenous people today. European settlement occurred from 1860 onwards seeing gold mining, farming and logging occur in the region, timber trees logged included red cedar Toona ciliata, blackbutt Eucalyptus pilularis and tallowood Eucalyptus microcorys. By the early 1900s state forests were declared and logging of remnant forests was gradually replaced with the establishment of hoop pine plantations. The national park was established in 1977 after lobbying by conservationists over proposed logging of pristine areas of the Conondale ranges which would have impacted on catchments and endangered species such as the plumed frogmouth, the park now encompasses over 35,000 ha providing opportunities for recreation such as bushwalking, camping, four wheel driving, horse riding and bird watching Many parts of the region have been re-vegetated by private landowners and Landcare groups.

== Ecological significance of Conondale National Park ==
=== Flora ===
Two thirds of the original vegetation in the Conondale region has been cleared including large areas of rainforest leaving a mosaic of cattle pastures, cropland, remnant forests and hoop pine plantations. Extensive areas of remnant forests remain in gullies and steeper parts of the Conondale ranges including large areas of un-managed regrowth. The national park protects significant areas of remnant vegetation including sub-tropical rainforest, wet and dry sclerophyll forest including remnant stands of bunya pine Araucaria bidwillii, hoop pine Araucaria cunninghamii including extremely tall stands of flooded gum Eucalyptus grandis and brush box Lophostemon confertus. Queensland's tallest tree a Eucalyptus grandis was recently discovered in the park in 2013 and stands at 73 metres tall. In total there are thirty one different vegetation types including extensive Palm vine forests, thirteen are listed as ‘of concern’ including gallery rainforests (notophyll vine forests) and semi-evergreen vine thickets which are listed as endangered.

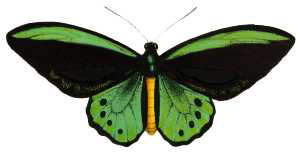
Richmond Birdwing Butterfly (Ornithoptera richmondius)

A total of 796 plant species are recorded in the park, twelve species are listed as endangered, vulnerable or near threatened. Notable threatened species include the gympie nut Macadamia ternifolia now listed as threatened on the IUCN Red List and listed vulnerable in Queensland and nationally. The brush sophora Sophora fraseri and Bosistoa transversa are listed nationally as Vulnerable and occurs in semi-evergreen vine thickets, it is threatened by changing fire regimes and competition from weeds.

=== Richmond birdwing butterfly recovery program ===
Conondale National Park is considered a critical site for the survival of the richmond birdwing butterfly Ornithoptera richmondia which is listed as vulnerable in Queensland, the park also has significant stands of the richmond birdwing vine Aristolochia praevenosa a species of critical priority for the butterfly. The vine is crucial in the lifecycle of the butterfly which occurs predominantly in rainforests along waterways, it is a food source for the larval stage of the butterfly's lifecycle and is the only plant the female butterfly will lay its eggs on. Threats include the exotic dutchmans pipe Aristolochia elegans which the female butterfly is attracted to and will lay her eggs on, however the leaves are fatal to the butterfly larvae. Extensive public education and conservation programs are underway in Queensland with cultivation, planting, control of weeds and ecological monitoring occurring.

=== Birds ===
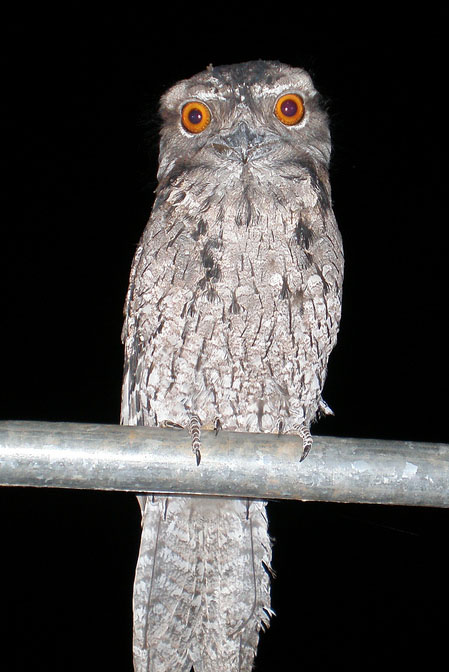
Plumed Frogmouth Podargus ocellatus plumiferus

Conondale National Park is considered an Important Bird Area (IBA) by Birdlife International with 174 bird species recorded in the park, fourteen species are considered endangered or vulnerable. Notable species include the pale-yellow robin Tregellasia capito, paradise riflebird Ptiloris paradiseus, green catbird Ailuroedus crassirostris, regent bowerbird Sericulus chrysocephalus and grey goshawk Accipiter novaehollandiae Australian logrunner Orthonyx temminckii. Threatened birds in the park include the Coxen's fig parrot Cyclopsitta diophthalma coxeni, red goshawk Erythrotriorchis radiatus, glossy black cockatoo (eastern) Calyptorhynchus lathami lathami and the powerful owl Ninox strenua.

The Conondale ranges provides an important northern refuge for populations of eastern bristlebirds Dasyornis brachypterus, a small semi-flightless bird dependent on vegetation cover and sensitive to fire. The bird was once common from Victoria to the Queensland but has declined, the species is now listed as Endangered under the IUCN red list of threatened species and listed nationally and in Queensland as endangered. Park managers are currently identifying and protecting suitable habitat within the national park and implementing the recovery plan for the northern population eastern bristlebirds. The plumed frogmouth Podargus ocellatus plumiferus is listed as vulnerable in Queensland and was only discovered in the Conondale ranges in 1976 with the national park considered a stronghold for the species. Its habitat is sub-tropical rainforest at high altitudes and estimates of current population in the Conondale ranges are around 800 pairs with less than 2,000 ha of suitable habitat in the region. Current populations are threatened by land clearing, inappropriate fire regimes and climate change.

The black-breasted button-quail Turnix melanogaster is a small ground dwelling bird which inhabits notophyll vine forest or ‘dry rainforests’ with up to 90% of its habitat has been cleared with less than 2,500 individuals estimated remaining in the wild. The species is listed as vulnerable nationally and in Queensland and is considered near threatened on the IUCN red list. The Conondale populations is considered an important population due to the size and location being within a national park.

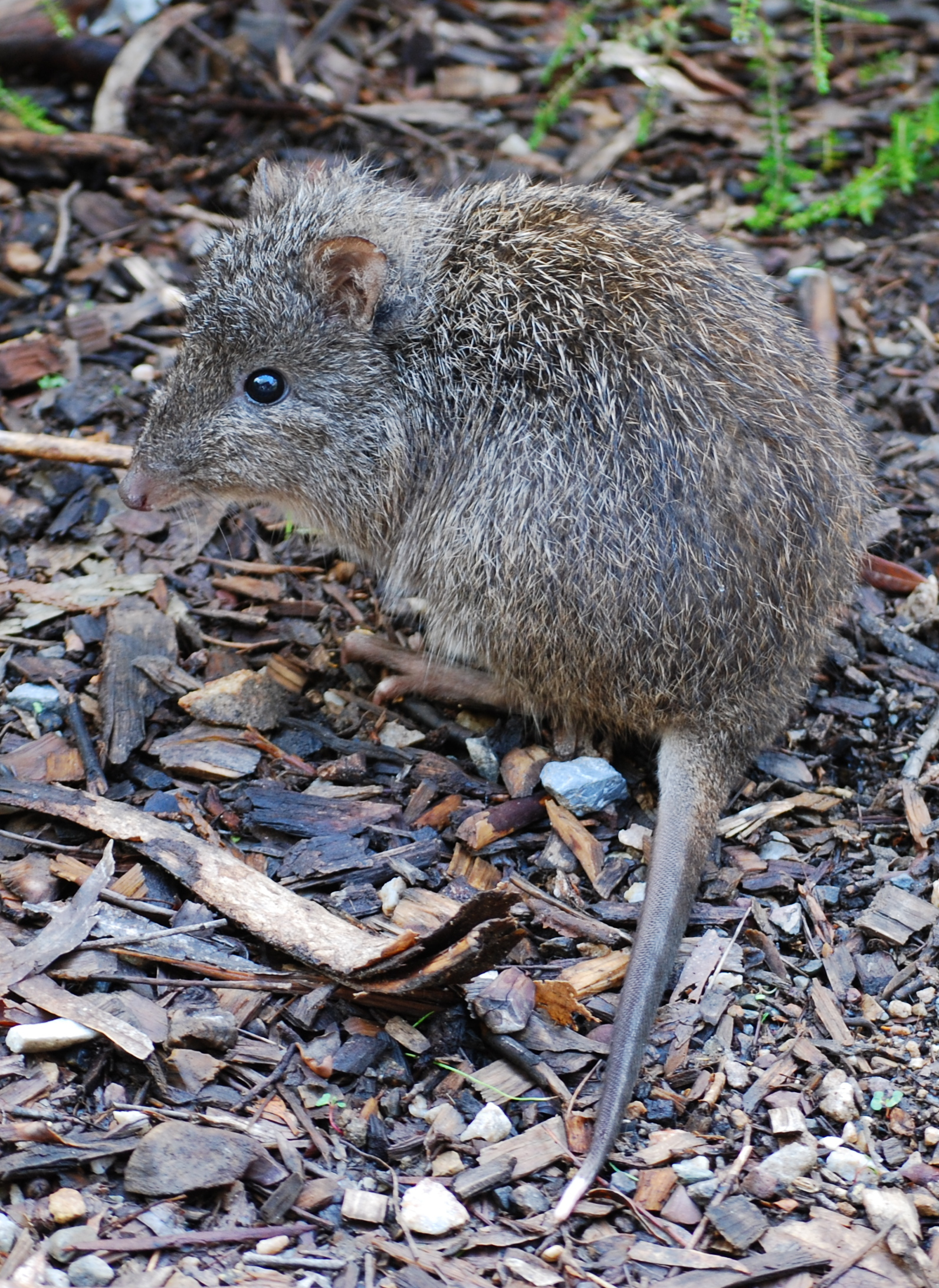
Long-nosed potoroo Potorous tridactylus

=== Mammals ===
There have been 68 species of mammals recorded in the park with many being uncommon and range restricted such as the yellow-bellied glider Petaurus australis, koala Phascolarctos cinereus, grey headed flying-fox Pteropus poliocephalus, golden-tipped bat Kerivoula papuensis. The rufous bettong Aepyprymnus rufescens occurs in the park and is the largest of the potoroos, it feeds at night on roots and fungi occurring in wet and dry sclerophyll forests. Threats include changes to fire regimes, over-grazing and predation by feral animals. The long-nosed potoroo Potorous tridactylus tridactylus is recorded in the park and is the smallest member of the kangaroo superfamily, it is listed nationally and in Queensland as vulnerable. Current threats include predation by European foxes and land clearing. The spotted-tail quoll Dasyurus maculatus maculatus has been recorded in the park and is mainland Australia's largest surviving marsupial and one of three distinct subspecies. The spotted-tail quoll has undergone drastic losses in Queensland with a 50–90% reduction in range since European settlement. This is attributed to habitat loss, fragmentation, logging, poison baiting, predators and cane toads, habitat critical to the spotted-tail quoll includes large tracts of undisturbed mature forest.

=== Amphibians ===
Thirty one species of frogs are known to occur in the Conondale ranges including species of scientific interest, the endangered Giant barred frog Mixophyes iteratus occurs at its northern limit. The endangered Fleay's barred frog Mixophyes fleayi and the vulnerable Tusked frog Adelotus brevis and Pearson's green tree frog Litoria pearsoniana have also been recorded in the park, the threatened stream frog recovery plan is currently being implemented along with monitoring of these threatened species in the park.

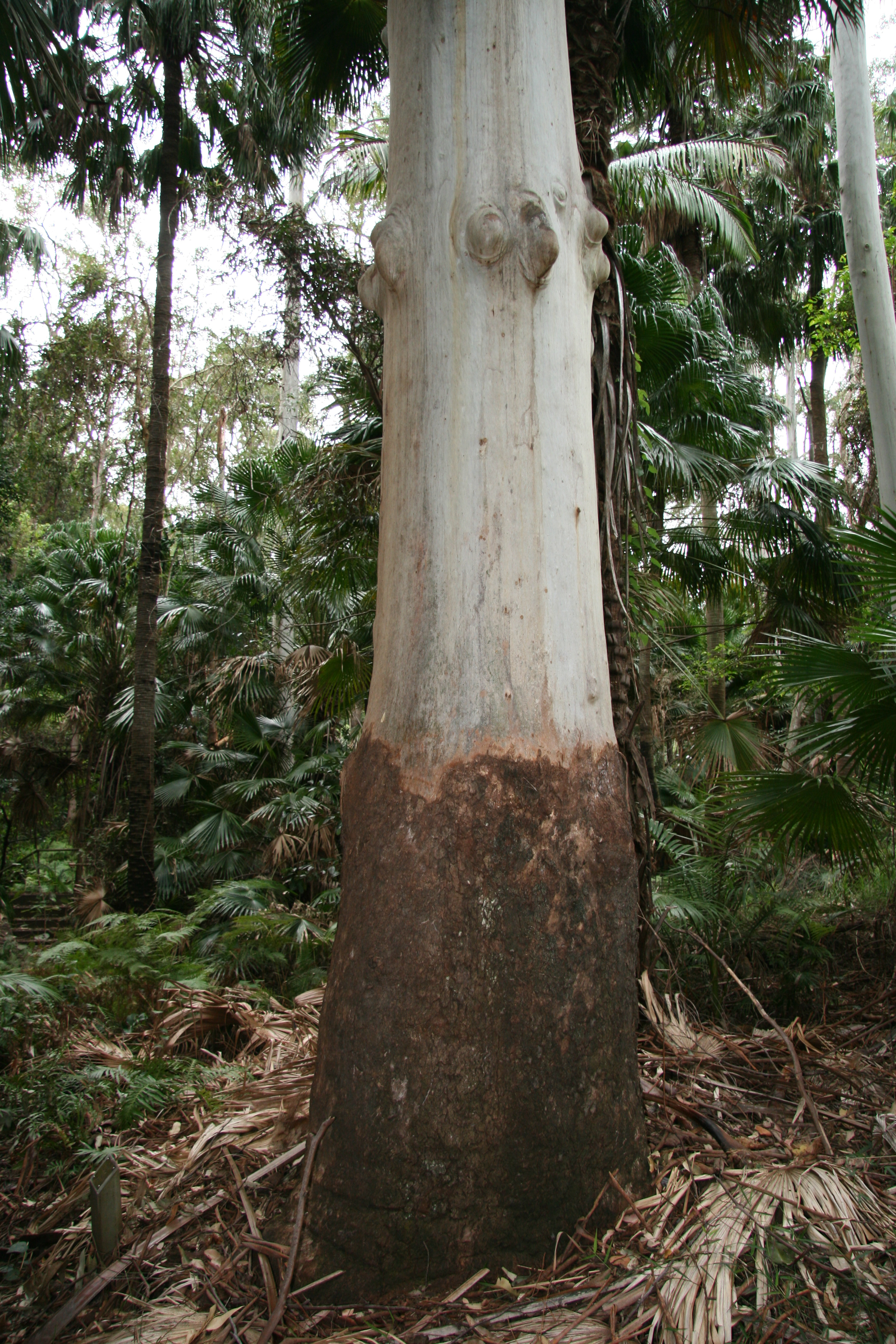
Flooded gum Eucalyptus grandis

The Conondale region has experienced recent rapid declines in frog populations; the Southern gastric brooding frog Rheobatrachus silus which only became known to science in 1973 and the Mount Glorious day frog Taudactylus diurnus declined rapidly between 1979 and 1981 with both presumed extinct. Four other species found in the park have also declined. There have been similar declines and disappearances of frogs in north Queensland and Central America under similar circumstances, the causes of these declines in still unknown but several hypotheses have been developed including the possible impact of chytrid fungus Batrachochytrium dendrobatidis which has been reported in the region.

=== Reptiles ===
There are 54 species of reptiles recorded in the park which include the venomous Rough-scaled snake Tropidechis carinatus, Lace monitor Varanus varius, Land mullet Bellatorias major, Jungle Carpet python Morelia spilota cheynei and the near threatened challenger skink Saproscincus rosei which occurs in rainforest but has also been found to occur in high densities in exotic Lantana camara thickets.

=== Invertebrates ===
The Conondale crayfish Euastacus urospinosus only occurs in upland rainforest streams in the Conondale and Blackall Range ranges, one of its strongholds is Conondale National Park. The crayfish burrows in rainforest streams at elevations between 450 and 550m, the Bundaroo creek system where the crayfish occurs has an absence of historical mining and logging which may account for its continued survival. The species is classified as endangered on IUCN red list with the species being highly range restricted due to climatic intolerances and susceptibility to catastrophic weather events and climate change. Other threats are feral pigs Sus scrofa wallowing and destroying creek bank vegetation and crayfish burrows.

== Environmental threats and conservation management ==
=== Conondale’s disappearing frogs - chytrid fungus ===
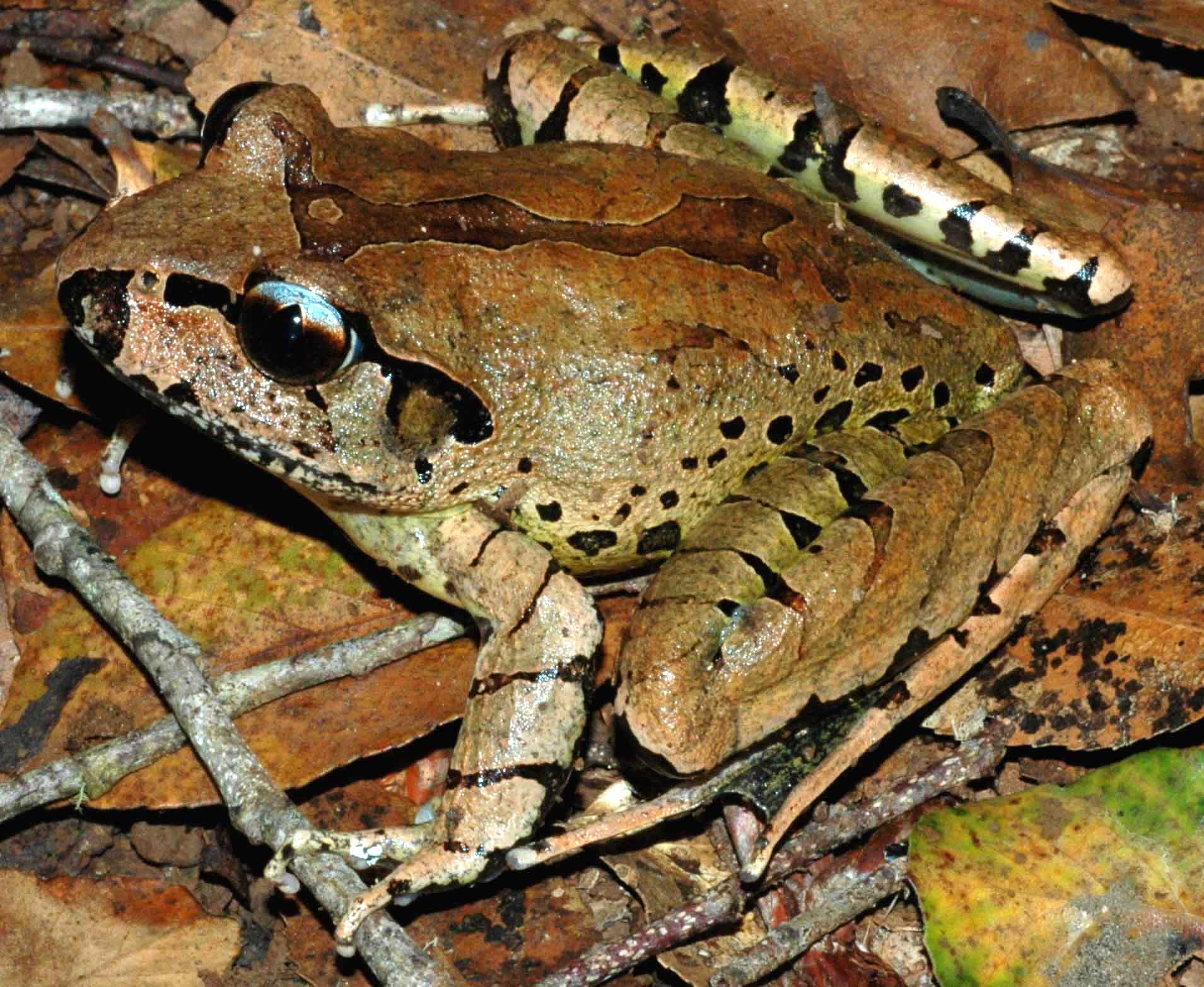
Fleay's barred frog Mixophyes fleayi

The southern gastric brooding was discovered in 1973 in the Conondale ranges, it displayed a unique reproductive mode in which the female would ingest the eggs which then complete their development in the mothers stomach. To survive the tadpoles secreted hormones to inhibit the digestive secretions of the stomach until they are given birth to via the mother's mouth. The species occurred in good numbers in high altitude rocky streams but in 1979 the species declined rapidly and disappeared with no sightings since 1981 despite continued efforts to relocate the species. This coincided with the rapid disappearance of the southern dayfrog which occurred at the same location as the southern gastric brooding frog, there have also been no sightings of the southern dayfrog since 1979 and both species are presumed extinct.

There are numerous theories as to why frog species have declined and disappeared, a possible cause is the chytrid fungus Batrachochytrium dendrobatidis which has been attributed to the decline of 14 montane specialist frogs in undisturbed rainforest habitat. Epidemics of the chytrid fungus have also occurred in Eungella National Park in North Queensland around 1985–1986 causing the decline of the Eungella gastric brooding frog Rheobatrachus vitellinus. The fungus is highly pathogenic and rapidly causes the decline and death of the host. In the case of the Eungella gastric brooding frog the population was able to persist and recover however the chytrid fungus still persists in the frog population. The federal government has identified the chytrid fungus as a key threatening process for stream frogs in Australia and has subsequently developed a threat abatement plan for the disease.

=== Forestry plantations ===
The national park borders areas of state forest and hoop pine plantations which are subject to on-going harvesting activities, these pose potential environmental threats to black-breasted button-quail which inhabits areas adjacent to the hoop pine plantations. The plumed frogmouth is sensitive to disturbance and has specialised habitat requirements of pristine forests, there are potential impacts from forest harvesting of native timber in the Conondale region. Additional impacts from forestry operations include increased siltation and erosion from disused roads and tracks may impact water quality.

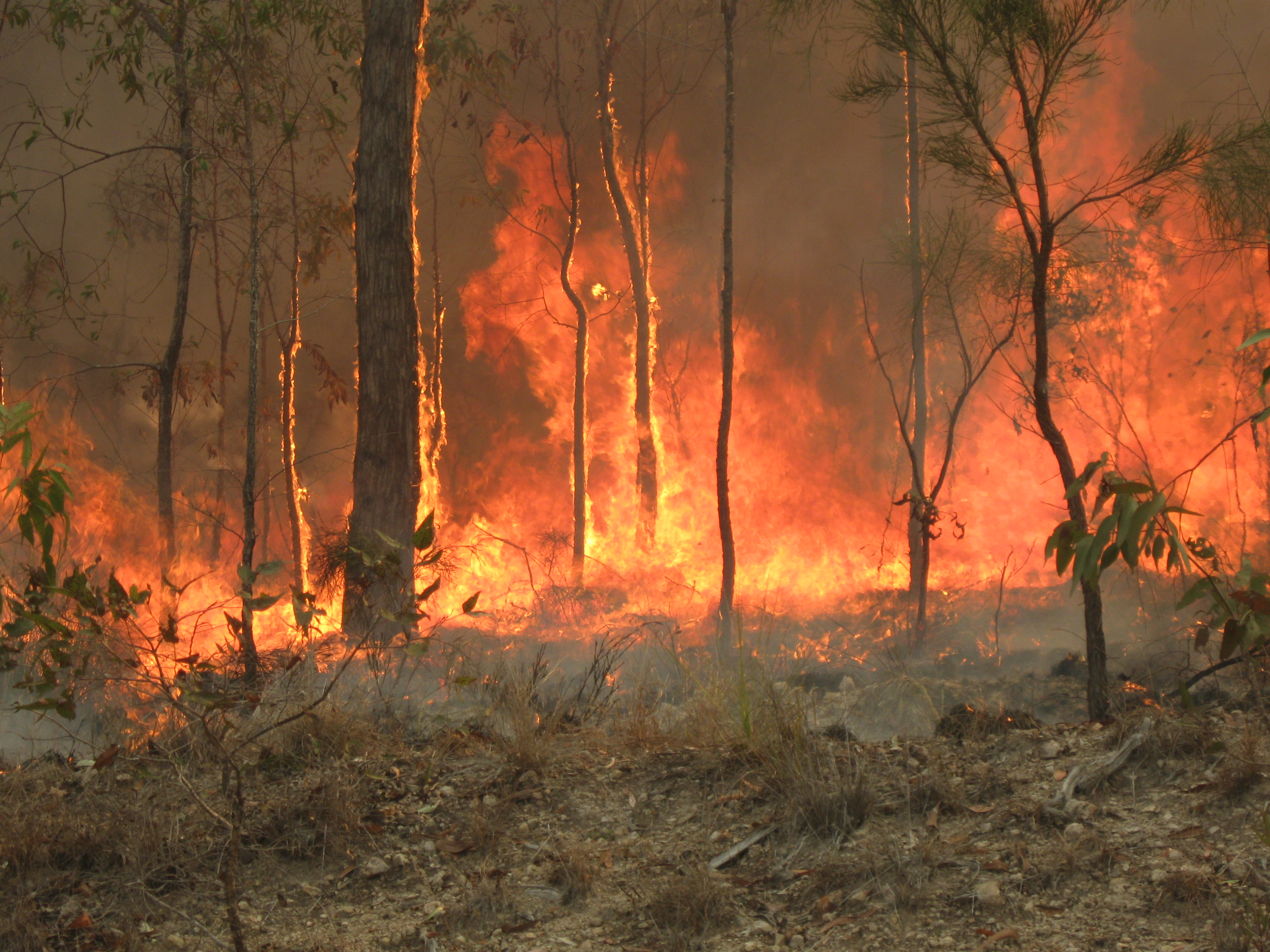
Many species in the park are sensitive to fire

=== Fire management ===
Fire has been identified as having impacts on species within the park, studies of the eastern bristlebird indicates it responds well to planned mosaic burning which allows the bird to move into areas of unburnt habitat after fire. Feral animal baiting after fire is also needed as reduced vegetation cover leaves the birds more susceptible to predation from feral cats and foxes. Species like the black-breasted button-quail and glossy black-cockatoos are also fire sensitive, the Eucalyptus montivaga community is reliant on fire for maintenance of a healthy understorey. A fire management strategy has been prepared for Conondale National Park with the Eucalyptus montivaga vegetation community currently being studied for its response to fire.

=== Climate change ===
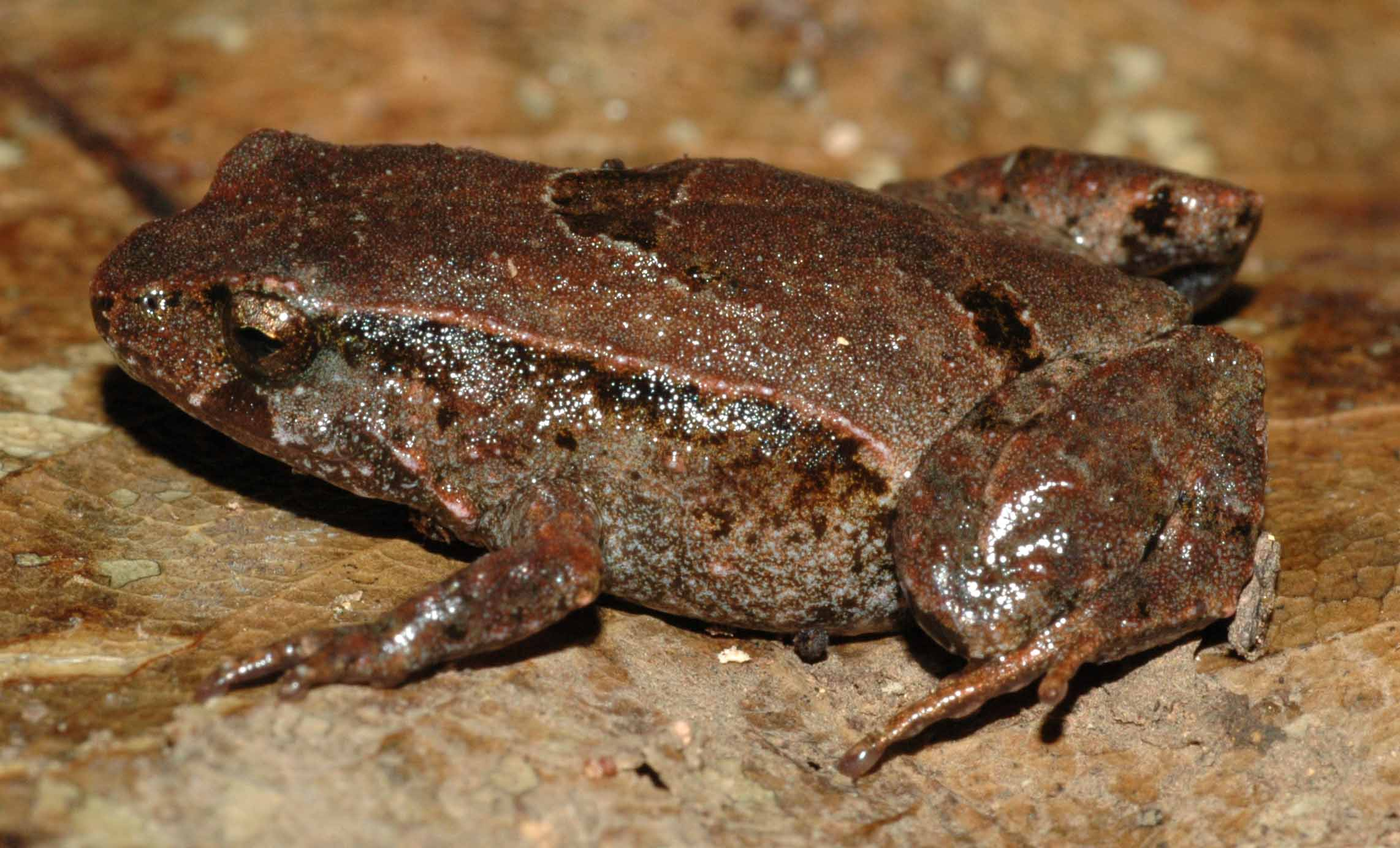
Pouched frog Assa darlingtoni may also be particularly susceptible to climate change

Climate change has been identified as a major threat to flora and fauna around the globe, amphibians have been identified as being particularly susceptible to climate changes. In a recent study identified a number of species in Conondale National Park as vulnerable to climate change which included the fleay's barred frog, pouched frog, Australian logrunner, challenger skink and plumed frogmouth. A possible cause of rapid declines in frog species could be attributed to climate change and the increase in UV light especially in high altitude regions. The Conondale crayfish which is sensitive to changes in temperature and may be impacted by future changes to climate temperature, the Eucalyptus montivaga vegetation community may also be particularly susceptible to climate change.

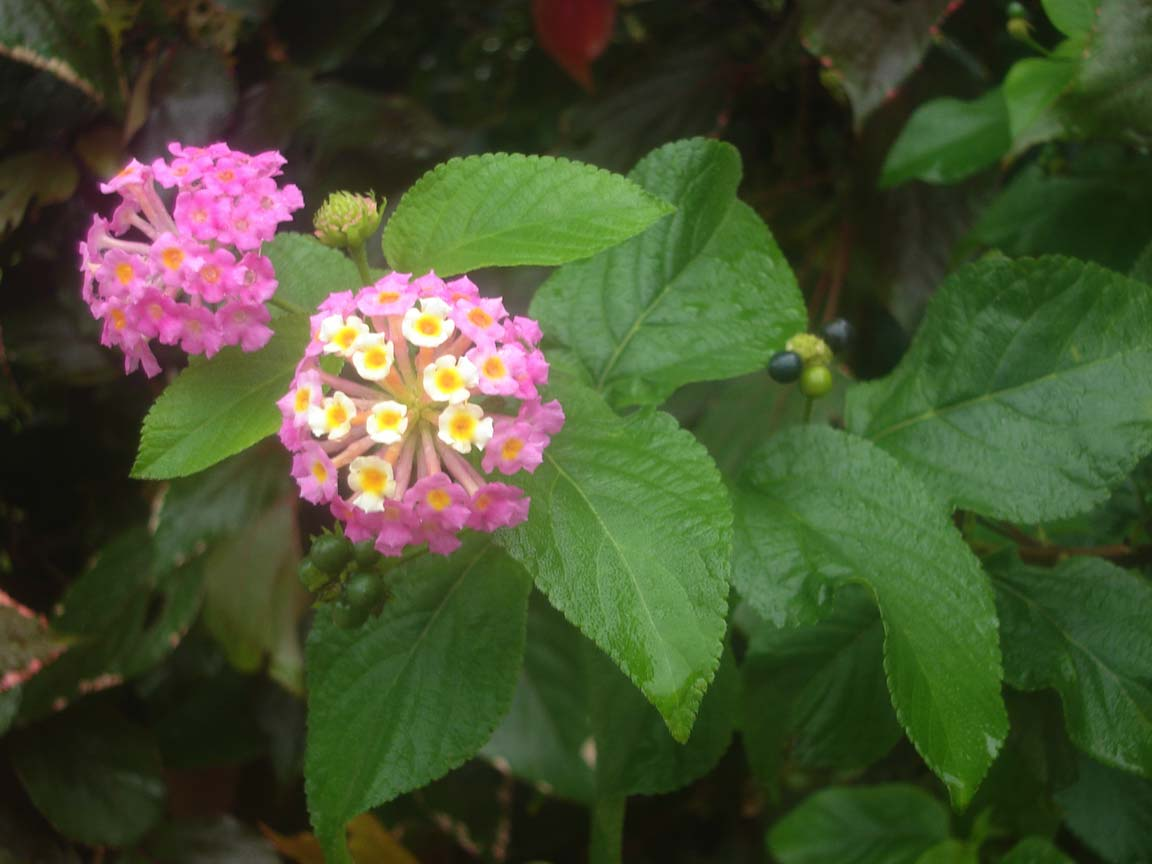
Lantana camara threatens rainforest

=== Management of pest plants and animals ===
A pest management strategy is currently being implemented for plant weed species such as lantana Lantana camara, dutchmans pipe, cat's claw creeper Macfadyena unguis-cati and crofton weed Ageratina adenophora which threaten species such as the richmond birdwing butterfly, eastern bristlebird and notophyll vine forests.

A number of feral animals are impacting native species and degrading habitat, feral animals in the park include cats Felis catus, foxes Vulpes vulpes and wild dogs Canis familiaris and pose specific threats to native animal species such as ground dwelling small mammals and birds such as the eastern bristlebird. Feral pigs Sus scrofa are being managed through on-going trapping, baiting and photo monitoring to reduce threats to species such as eastern bristlebirds, long-nosed potoroos and black-breasted button-quails. Red deer Cervus elaphus are also impacting on the habitat of frogs and eastern bristlebirds.

== See also ==
- Protected areas of Queensland
