= Eungella =

Eungella may refer to:

== Places ==
- Eungella, Queensland, a rural town and locality in the Mackay Region, Australia
- Eungella National Park, a protected area in the Mackay Region, Queensland, Australia
- Eungella Dam, a dam in Queensland, Australia
- Eungella, New South Wales, a town in New South Wales, Australia

== Animals ==
- Eungella honeyeater
- Eungella torrent frog
- Eungella tinker frog
- Eungella gastric brooding frog
