= Mount Glorious day frog =

Conservation status
- Extinct (1979) (IUCN 3.1)

Scientific classification
- Domain: Eukaryota
- Kingdom: Animalia
- Phylum: Chordata
- Class: Amphibia
- Order: Anura
- Family: Myobatrachidae
- Genus: Taudactylus
- Species: †T. diurnus

Binomial name
- †Taudactylus diurnus Straughan & Lee, 1966

Extinct species of amphibian

The Mount Glorious day frog (Taudactylus diurnus), also known as Mount Glorious torrent frog and southern day frog, is an extinct species of frog native to south-east Queensland. It was last seen in 1979 and was declared extinct in 2008.

== Description ==
Mount Glorious day frogs varied in size, ranging from 22.0-30.6 mm in length. Males generally ranged from 22.0-27.2 mm long, while females were slightly larger, ranging from 23.3-30.6 mm. The dorsal skin had a grey or brown tone with dark spots or streaks, and was mostly smooth, with some granular texture. The abdominal skin was a creamy white or bluish-grey, with occasional grey spots.

== Taxonomy ==
Closest living relatives of the Mount Glorious day frog are the Sharp snouted day frog (Taudactylus acutirostris), the Eungella torrent frog (Taudactylus eungellensis), the Eungella tinker frog (Taudactylus liemi), the Kroombit tinker frog (Taudactylus pleione), and the Northern tinker frog (Taudactylus rheophilus).

== Habitat and distribution ==
Taudactylus diurnus is native to Australia, and was found in the Blackall, Conondale, and D’Aguilar Ranges. The species resided in the altitudinal range of 350 to 800 meters above sea level. The Mount Glorious day frog vanished from the D’Aguilar Range in 1975, followed by its disappearance from the Blackall Range in 1978 and lastly from the Conondale Range in early 1979.

D’Aguilar Range, Conondale Range, and Kondalilla Falls still remain protected habitats within the Australian National Parks system, although no new evidence of the frog has been found.

The species occupied montane rain forests, specifically in long-lasting and temporary streams on gravel, clay, sand and usually areas with rocky soil substrate. It was also found in exposed areas, gorges, and dense wet areas with a lot of vegetation.

== Ecology ==
The Mount Glorious day frog was most active during the day, becoming less and less active toward the evening. As it was found primarily along streams, it rarely moved far away from such wet environments, and it frequently had to enter the water. This included swimming often or submerging itself in the water from time to time for rehydration. At night, when the frogs were less active, they could be seen moving throughout cool rock crevices and staying in moist parts of their environment like under debris, along the water's edge, and around damp vegetation.

=== Reproduction ===
The species bred in warm weather after or during heavy rain from late October to May, with a January to March peak. The female deposited 24-36 eggs in gelatinous clumps under rocks or branches in the water; tadpoles could be found throughout the year. Males and females participated in amplexus mating behavior.

=== Diet ===
The Mount Glorious day frog fed primarily on small invertebrates along the forest floor. These include flat-bodied crustaceans, winged insects, butterfly or moth larvae, and other small insects along streams.

== Extinction ==
Taudactylus diurnus was first described by Australian zoologists Straughan and Lee in 1966. The frog was abundant in the south eastern Queensland in the early 1970s but then rapidly began to decline. In a period of about 3 to 4 years, the frog was considered to be endangered, having disappeared from D’Aguilar Range around 1975 and Blackall Range around 1978. The species has not been spotted since approximately 1979. In 1994, the Groombridge Scientific Journal declared the species to be endangered, which was followed up in 1996 with the IUCN Redlist declaring the species to be critically endangered. Efforts to relocate the species continued up until 2008, when the IUCN Redlist officially declared the species extinct due to a lack of evidence of their existence in the wild for roughly 25 years.

=== Causes of extinction ===
One of the threats to the Mount Glorious day frog was the contamination of water with mud by feral pigs. Feral pigs made the water muddy making it difficult for the frogs to reproduce and develop. In addition, feral pigs also preyed on the frogs. Changes in the flow of stream water, the spread of invasive species, and the spread of chytridiomycosis have also been implicated in the disappearance of the species. A connection has been made between the frog's extinction and the presence of the invasive plant species Lantana camara and Ageratina riparia.
