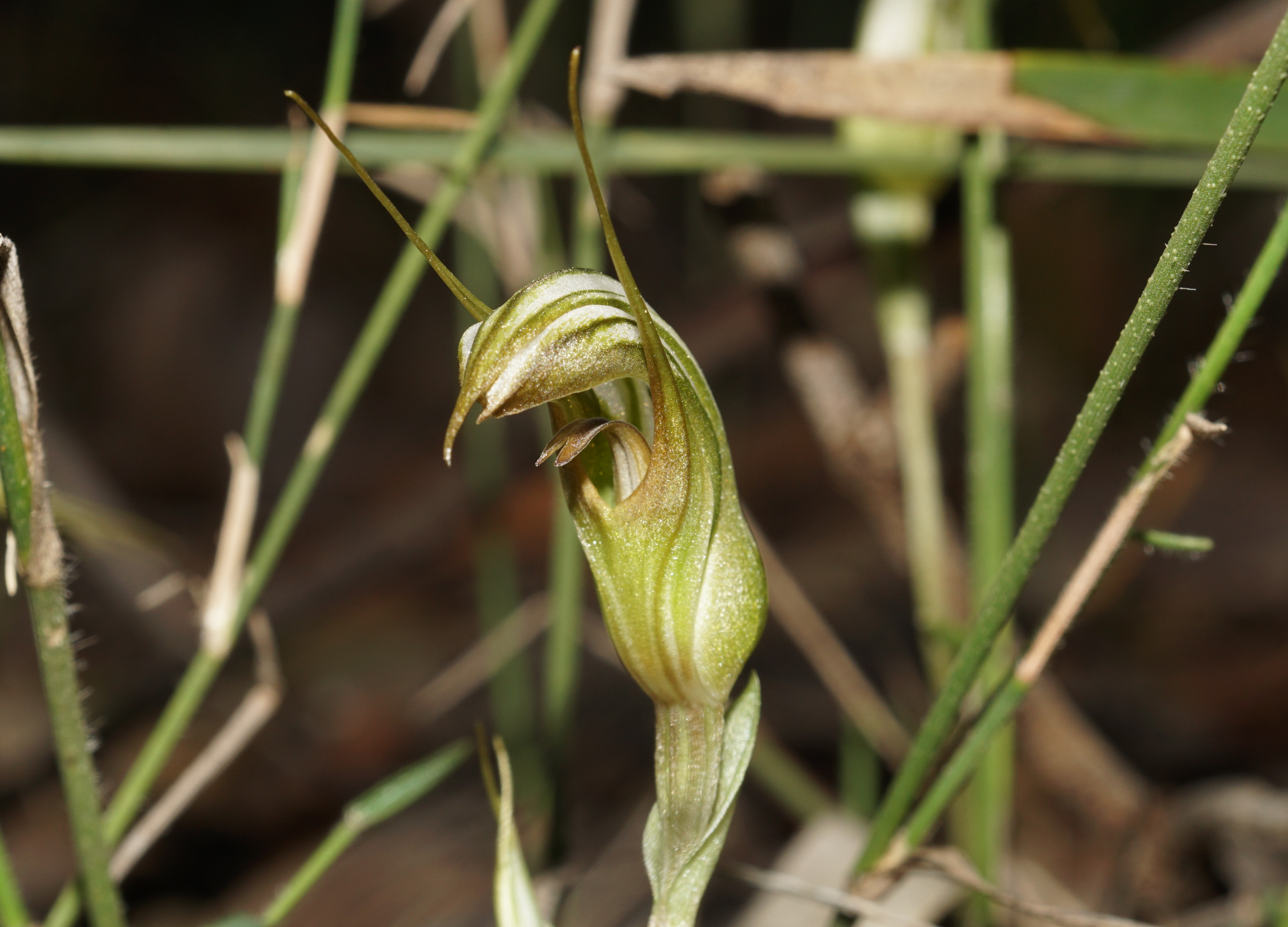
- In Columbey National Park near Dungog

Scientific classification
- Kingdom: Plantae
- Clade: Tracheophytes
- Clade: Angiosperms
- Clade: Monocots
- Order: Asparagales
- Family: Orchidaceae
- Subfamily: Orchidoideae
- Tribe: Cranichideae
- Genus: Pterostylis
- Species: P. ophioglossa

Binomial name
- Pterostylis ophioglossa R.Br.

Synonyms
- Taurantha ophioglossa (R.Br.) D.L.Jones & M.A.Clem.; Diplodium ophioglossum (R.Br.) M.A.Clem. & D.L.Jones

= Pterostylis ophioglossa =

Snake-tongue greenhood

Species of orchid

Pterostylis ophioglossa, commonly known as the snake-tongue greenhood, is a species of orchid endemic to eastern Australia. It has a rosette of leaves at the base and a single dull green, white and brown flower with a deeply notched labellum.

== Description ==
Pterostylis ophioglossa is a terrestrial, perennial, deciduous, herb with an underground tuber and a rosette of between four and six egg-shaped leaves. Each leaf is 15–25 mm (0.6–1 in) long and 4–20 mm (0.2–0.8 in) wide. Flowering plants have a similar rosette and a single dull green, brown and white flower borne on a flowering spike 100–250 mm (4–10 in) high. The flowers are 25–30 mm (0.98–1.2 in) long, 10–13 mm (0.4–0.5 in) wide and lean forward. The dorsal sepal and petals are joined and curve forward forming a hood called the "galea" over the column but the dorsal sepal is longer than the petals and has a pointed tip 2–3 mm (0.08–0.1 in) long. There is a flat, broad U-shaped sinus between the lateral sepals which have erect, thread-like tips 22–30 mm (0.9–1 in) long. The labellum protrudes above the sinus and is 13–16 mm (0.5–0.6 in) long, about 3 mm (0.1 in) wide, curved and brown with a deep notch on the end. Flowering occurs between April and July.

== Taxonomy and naming ==
Pterostylis ophioglossa was first described in 1810 by Robert Brown and the description was published in Prodromus Florae Novae Hollandiae et Insulae Van Diemen. The specific epithet (ophioglossa) is derived from the ancient Greek words ophis (ὄφις) meaning "snake" and glōssa (γλῶσσα) meaning "tongue".

== Distribution and habitat ==
The snake-tongue greenhood grows in sheltered places in forest and scrub in coastal areas between Sydney in New South Wales and Eungella in Queensland.
