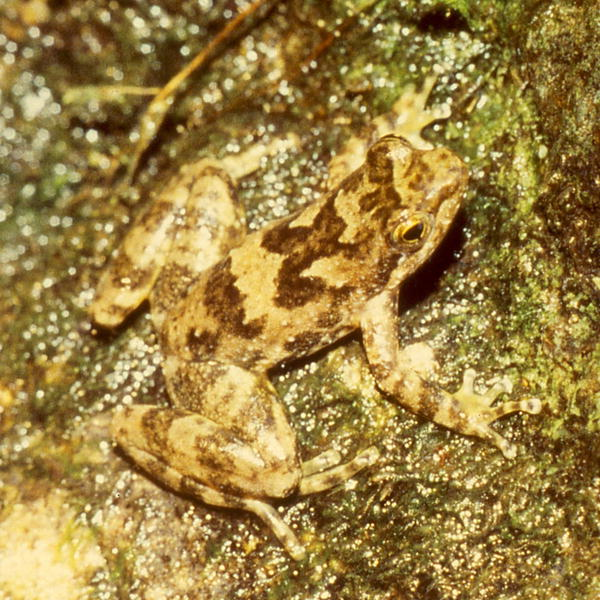
- Eungella torrent frog, Taudactylus eungellensis

Scientific classification
- Kingdom: Animalia
- Phylum: Chordata
- Class: Amphibia
- Order: Anura
- Family: Myobatrachidae
- Subfamily: Myobatrachinae
- Genus: Taudactylus; Straughan & Lee, 1966

Species
- 6 species (see text)
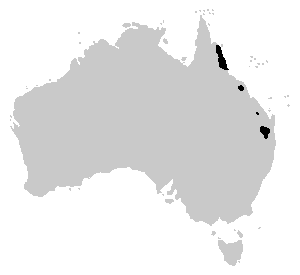
- Range of Taudactylus

= Taudactylus =

Genus of amphibians

Taudactylus is a genus of frogs in the family Myobatrachidae. These frogs are endemic to rainforest areas of coastal eastern Australia, most of this genus inhabit fast flowing streams in highland area. Most members of this genus have suffered serious declines, in which the disease chytridiomycosis appears to have played a significant role: T. diurnus is believed to be extinct, while all others except T. liemi are listed as critically endangered by the IUCN. These listings are conservative, and it is likely T. acutirostris, presently listed as critically endangered, already is extinct.

They are distinguishable from other Australian myobatrachids by the T-shaped pad at the end of each finger and toe. They are all small frogs and reach no larger than 40 mm in length. The fingers and toes are unwebbed and the skin is generally smooth. The tympanum is large and is either visible or hidden. They lack vocal sacs but all species are known to call. The Eungella Torrent Frog is the only known Myobatrachid known to show its presence by the movement of its body.

Of the six species in the genus Taudactylus, one of the most primitive groups of frogs in Australia, two are restricted to the Wet Tropics of Queensland. T. rheophilus had been recorded only from the Bellenden Ker Range, Lamb Range, Carbine Tableland and Thornton Peak, all recognised refugial areas but has suffered massive declines over its entire former range. Prior to 1988, T. acutirostris occurred in upland streams throughout the World Heritage Area. However, it has since suffered a dramatic decline in numbers and its status is considered critical. The catastrophic amphibian declines which have occurred in the Wet Tropics have been attributed to an amphibian fungal disease caused by Batrachochytrium dendrobatidis.

== Cause of amphibian declines identified ==
In 1992 an experimental translocation experiment was being conducted to determine the cause of population declines in T. acutirostris. Frogs and tadpoles from a stream in the north of the species range were collected and placed into observation enclosures at five sites to the south where the species had disappeared and in a control enclosure at the collection site. During this experiment, the scientist, Michael Mahony (Newcastle University) and Andrew Dennis (James Cook University, observed sick and dying frogs of T. acutirostris and several other stream frogs (Litoria rheocola, Litoria nannotis) in the enclosures and on the stream from where the frogs and tadpoles were being collected. They collected specimens and dispatched them to veterinary pathologists at James Cook University. This was the first observation of the cause of amphibian declines in Australia and directly led to the identification of a fungal pathogen (Batrachochytridium dendrobatididis) as the cause.

== Species ==
There are six species:

Common name	Binomial name
Sharp-snouted torrent frog	Taudactylus acutirostris (Andersson, 1913) (extinct)
Mount Glorious torrent frog	Taudactylus diurnus Straughan & Lee, 1966 (extinct)
Eungella torrent frog	Taudactylus eungellensis Liem & Hosmer, 1973
Liem's frog	Taudactylus liemi Ingram, 1980
Kroombit tinker frog	Taudactylus pleione Czechura, 1986
Tinkling frog	Taudactylus rheophilus Liem & Hosmer, 1973
