= Kroombit tinker frog =

Conservation status
- Critically Endangered (IUCN 3.1)

Scientific classification
- Kingdom: Animalia
- Phylum: Chordata
- Class: Amphibia
- Order: Anura
- Family: Myobatrachidae
- Genus: Taudactylus
- Species: T. pleione

Binomial name
- Taudactylus pleione Czechura, 1986

Endangered species of amphibian of Queensland, Australia (Taudactylus pleione)

The Kroombit tinker frog (Taudactylus pleione), also sometimes referred to as Pleione's torrent frog, is a species of frog in the family Myobatrachidae. It is endemic to Central Queensland in Australia. It lives among rocks and leaf litter near small flowing streams.

== Conservation ==
As most other members of the genus Taudactylus, this species has declined drastically and is consequently considered critically endangered by the IUCN. The reason for this decline is unclear, but likely linked to the disease Chytridiomycosis (chytrid fungus). It may also be threatened by habitat loss.

It is listed as Critically Endangered on the IUCN Red List, and as Endangered under Queensland's Nature Conservation Act 1992 and critically endangered under the national EPBC Act.

As of November 2020, it was estimated fewer than 200 remained in the wild, in areas of tropical rainforest at Kroombit Tops National Park, approximately 70 kilometres (43 mi) south-west of Gladstone. The major threat to its existence, apart from climate change, less habitat and certain pests, remains chytrid fungus.

In 2020, Australian scientists at Currumbin Wildlife Sanctuary at Currumbin on the Gold Coast bred the Kroombit tinker frog in captivity for the first time, raising hopes of preventing extinction. They had been trying since around 2000, but it was only when the wildlife sanctuary came offered a frog-breeding facility in 2008 that the work could properly begin. They eventually managed to bring about a spawning by their captive frogs, and the first tadpole metamorphosed into a frog in November 2020.
