= Sharp snouted day frog =

Conservation status
- Extinct (IUCN 3.1)

Scientific classification
- Kingdom: Animalia
- Phylum: Chordata
- Class: Amphibia
- Order: Anura
- Family: Myobatrachidae
- Genus: Taudactylus
- Species: †T. acutirostris

Binomial name
- †Taudactylus acutirostris (Andersson, 1916)

Species of amphibian

The sharp snouted day frog (Taudactylus acutirostris), or sharp-nosed torrent frog, is an extinct species of frog in the family Myobatrachidae. It was endemic to upland rainforest streams in north-eastern Queensland in Australia.

== Description ==
It was a diurnal, conspicuous and locally abundant species, but a rapid population decline began in 1988. It is considered endangered under Queensland's Nature Conservation Act 1992. The primary cause for its rapid decline is believed to be the disease chytridiomycosis.
