= Elaeocarpus largiflorens =

Tropical quandong

Scientific classification
- Kingdom: Plantae
- Clade: Tracheophytes
- Clade: Angiosperms
- Clade: Eudicots
- Clade: Rosids
- Order: Oxalidales
- Family: Elaeocarpaceae
- Genus: Elaeocarpus
- Species: E. largiflorens

Binomial name
- Elaeocarpus largiflorens C.T.White

Species of tree endemic to Queensland

Elaeocarpus largiflorens, commonly known as tropical quandong, is a species of flowering plant in the family Elaeocarpaceae and is endemic to Queensland. It is a medium-sized to large tree, sometimes with buttress roots at the base of the trunk, mostly elliptic leaves and reddish-brown flowers.

== Description ==
Elaeocarpus largiflorens is a tree that typically grows to a height of 15–30 m (49–98 ft), sometimes with buttress roots at the base of the trunk. Its young leaves and shoots are densely covered with short, reddish-brown hairs. The leaves are elliptic, 80–120 mm (3.1–4.7 in) long and 145–75 mm (5.7–3.0 in) wide on a petiole 20–55 mm (0.79–2.17 in) long. The flowers are borne in groups of up to about twenty on a rachis 30–70 mm (1.2–2.8 in) long, each flower on a pedicel 5–10 mm (0.20–0.39 in) long. The flowers are densely covered with reddish-brown hairs. The five sepals are egg-shaped, 5.5–6 mm (0.22–0.24 in) long and 2–2.4 mm (0.079–0.094 in) wide, the five petals oblong, 6.5–8 mm (0.26–0.31 in) long and 0.8 mm (0.031 in) wide. Between sixty and seventy stamens are crowded around and obscuring the ovary. Flowering occurs from January to March and the fruit is an oval drupe 16–17 mm (0.63–0.67 in) long and 10–11 mm (0.39–0.43 in) wide, present from September to December.

== Taxonomy ==
Elaeocarpus largiflorens was first formally described in 1933 by Cyril Tenison White in Contributions from the Arnold Arboretum of Harvard University from material he collected near Malanda in 1923.

In 1984, Mark James Elgar Coode described two subspecies in the journal Kew Bulletin and the names are accepted by the Australian Plant Census:

- Elaeocarpus largiflorens C.T.White subsp. largiflorens has its main leaf veins in an even curve;
- Elaeocarpus largiflorens subsp. retinervis B.Hyland & Coode has zig-zagged main leaf veins.

== Distribution and habitat ==
Elaeocarpus largiflorens grows in rainforest at altitudes up to 1,200 m (3,900 ft) in north-east and central-eastern Queensland. Subspecies retinervis is restricted to the Mount Spurgeon - Mount Lewis area.

== Conservation status ==
Both subspecies of E. largiflorens are listed as of "least concern" under the Queensland Government Nature Conservation Act 1992.
