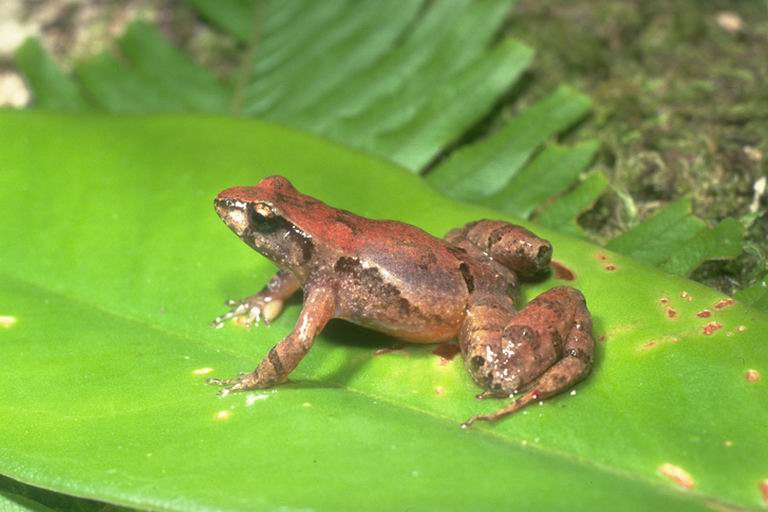

Conservation status
- Least Concern (IUCN 3.1)

Scientific classification
- Kingdom: Animalia
- Phylum: Chordata
- Class: Amphibia
- Order: Anura
- Family: Myobatrachidae
- Genus: Taudactylus
- Species: T. liemi

Binomial name
- Taudactylus liemi Ingram, 1980

= Eungella tinker frog =

Species of amphibian

The Eungella tinker frog (Taudactylus liemi), also known as Eungella tinkerfrog, Liem's frog, or Liem's tinker frog, is a species of frog in the family Myobatrachidae. It is endemic to the Eungella area in Queensland, Australia. It lives in rocky margins of fast-flowing creeks and seepages in montane rainforest at elevations of 180–1,250 m (590–4,100 ft) above sea level, but it is more common above 600 m (2,000 ft). It is commonly heard but rarely seen. In contrast to other amphibians in the area, such as Taudactylus eungellensis, no adverse effects of the chytrid fungus Batrachochytrium dendrobatidis have been reported on this species. It is currently facing no major threats, although its habitat could be impacted by grazing and trampling of streamside vegetation by livestock. Also invasive cane toads (Rhinella marina) are a potential future threat. Its range is with the Eungella National Park.
