= Northern tinker frog =

Conservation status
- Critically endangered, possibly extinct (IUCN 3.1)

Scientific classification
- Kingdom: Animalia
- Phylum: Chordata
- Class: Amphibia
- Order: Anura
- Family: Myobatrachidae
- Genus: Taudactylus
- Species: T. rheophilus

Binomial name
- Taudactylus rheophilus Liem & Hosmer, 1973

Species of amphibian

The northern tinker frog, northern timber frog, or tinkling frog (Taudactylus rheophilus) is a species of frog in the family Myobatrachidae. It is endemic to humid mountainous areas of north-eastern Queensland in Australia. It lives among rocks and logs at small fast-flowing streams. Adults are nocturnal.

== Conservation status ==
As most other members of the genus Taudactylus, this species has declined drastically. It is listed as Critically Endangered on the IUCN Red List and under the Environment Protection and Biodiversity Conservation Act 1999. The precise reason for this decline is unclear, but likely linked to the disease chytridiomycosis. It may also be threatened by habitat loss.
