= Rheobatrachus vitellinus =

Conservation status
- Extinct (1987) (IUCN 3.1)

Scientific classification
- Kingdom: Animalia
- Phylum: Chordata
- Class: Amphibia
- Order: Anura
- Family: Myobatrachidae
- Genus: †Rheobatrachus
- Species: †R. vitellinus

Binomial name
- †Rheobatrachus vitellinus (Mahony, Tyler & Davies, 1984)

Extinct species of frog

Rheobatrachus vitellinus, commonly called northern gastric-brooding frog, is an extinct species of gastric-brooding frog native to Australia. It was last seen in 1987 and was declared extinct in 2015.

== Distribution ==
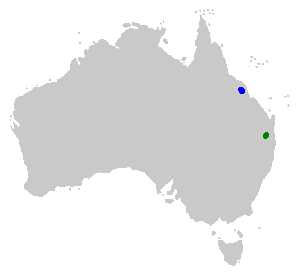
Distribution of the northern gastric-brooding frog (blue)

The northern gastric-brooding frog (Rheobatrachus vitellinus) was discovered in 1970 by Michael Mahony. It was restricted to the rainforest areas of the Clarke Range in Eungella National Park and the adjacent Pelion State Forest in central eastern Queensland. This species, too, was confined to a small area – less than 500 km^{2} (190 sq mi), at altitudes of 400–1,000 m (1,300–3,300 ft). A year after its discovery, it was never seen again despite extensive efforts to locate it. This species is considered to be extinct.

== Description ==
The northern gastric-brooding frog was a much larger species than the southern gastric-brooding frog. Males reached 50–53 mm (2.0–2.1 in) in length, and females 66–79 mm (2.6–3.1 in) in length. This species was also much darker in colour, usually pale brown, and like the southern gastric-brooding frogs its skin was bumpy and had a slimy mucus coating. There were vivid yellow blotches on the abdomen and the underside of the arms and legs. The rest of the belly was white or grey in colour. The tympanum was hidden and the iris was dark brown. The body shape of the northern gastric-brooding frog was very similar to the southern species.

== Ecology and behaviour ==
The northern gastric-brooding frog was only recorded in pristine rainforests where the only form of human disturbance was poorly defined walking tracks. As with the southern gastric-brooding frog, the northern gastric-brooding frog was also a largely aquatic species. They were found in and around the shallow sections of fast flowing creeks and streams where individuals were located in shallow, rocky, broken-water areas, in cascades, riffles and trickles. The water in these streams was cool and clear, and the frogs hid away beneath or between boulders in the current or in backwaters.

Male northern gastric-brooding frogs called from the water's edge during summer. The call was loud, consisting of several staccato notes. It was similar to the southern gastric-brooding frog's call although deeper, shorter and repeated less often.

The northern gastric-brooding frog was observed feeding on caddisfly larvae and terrestrial and aquatic beetles as well as the Eungella torrent frog (Taudactylus eungellensis).

== De-extinction attempt ==
Scientists are making progress in their efforts to bring the gastric-brooding frog species back to life using somatic-cell nuclear transfer (SCNT), a method of cloning.

In March 2013, Australian scientists successfully created a living embryo from non-living preserved genetic material. These scientists from the University of Newcastle Australia led by Prof Michael Mahony, who was the scientist who first discovered the northern gastric-brooding frog, Simon Clulow and Prof Mike Archer from the University of New South Wales hope to continue using somatic-cell nuclear transfer methods to produce an embryo that can survive to the tadpole stage. "We do expect to get this guy hopping again," says UNSW researcher Mike Archer.

The scientists from the University of Newcastle have also reported successful freezing and thawing (cryopreservation) of totipotent amphibian embryonic cells, which along with sperm cryopreservation provides the essential "proof of concept" for the use of cryostorage as a genome bank for threatened amphibians and also other animals.

== Bibliography ==
- Barker, J.; Grigg, G. C.; Tyler, M. J. (1995): A Field Guide to Australian Frogs. Surrey Beatty & Sons.
- Pough, F. H.; Andrews, R. M.; Cadle, J. E.; Crump, M.; Savitsky, A. H. & Wells, K. D. (2003): Herpetology (3rd ed.). Pearson Prentice Hall, Upper Saddle River, New Jersey.
- Ryan, M. (ed.) (2003): Wildlife of Greater Brisbane. Queensland Museum, Brisbane.
- Ryan, M. & Burwell, C. (eds.) (2003): Wildlife of Tropical North Queensland. Queensland Museum, Brisbane.
- Tyler, M. J. (1984): There's a frog in my throat/stomach. William Collins Pty Ltd, Sydney. ISBN 0-00-217321-2
- Tyler, M. J. (1994): Australian Frogs – A Natural History. Reed Books.
- Zug, G. E.; Vitt, L. J. & Caldwell, J. P. (2001): Herpetology (2nd ed.). Academic Press, San Diego, California.
