= Eungella National Park =

Protected area in Queensland, Australia

- IUCN category II (national park)
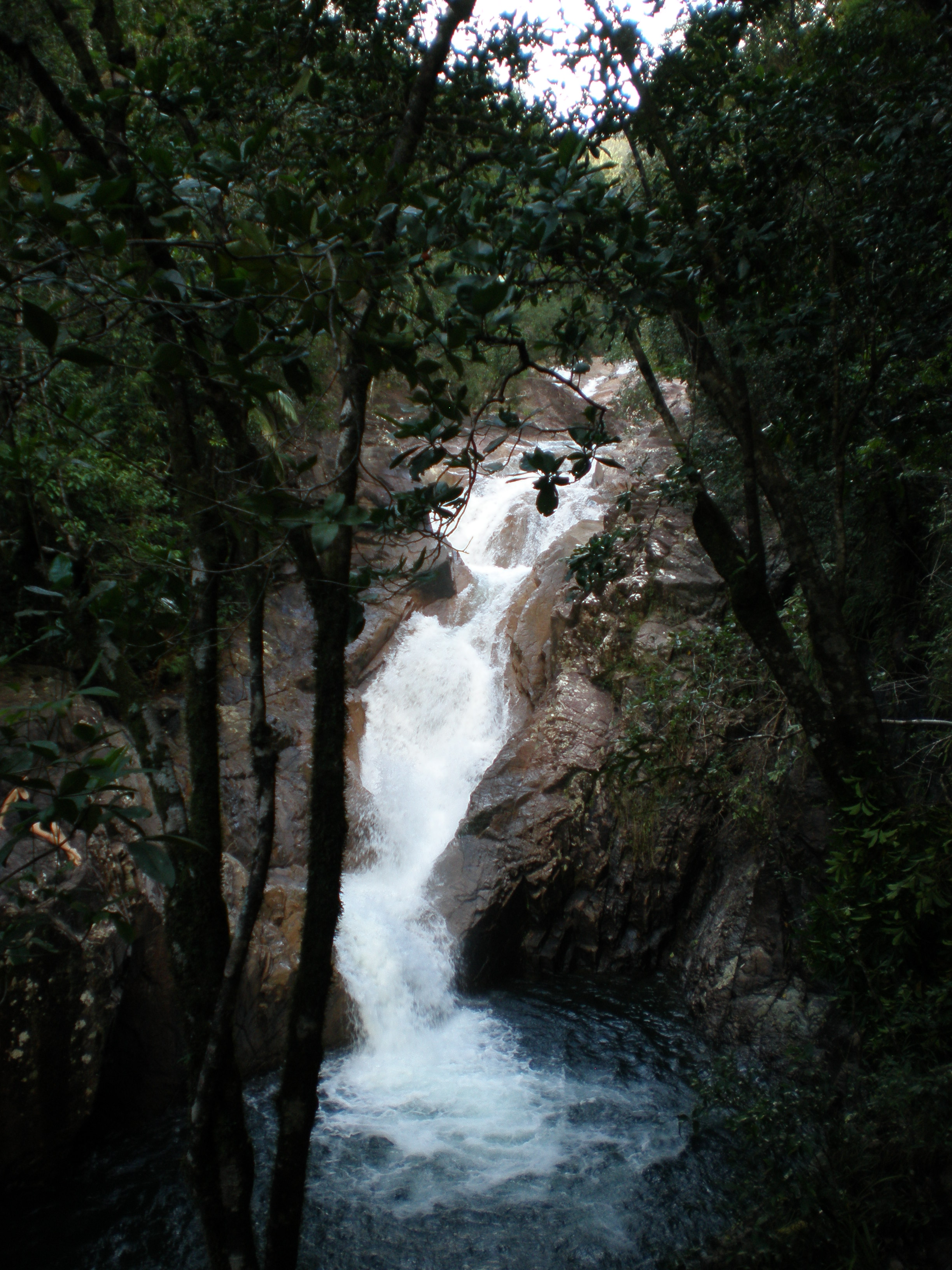
- Araluen Falls in Eungella National Park

- Location within Queensland
- Location: Queensland
- Nearest city: Mackay
- Coordinates: 20°55′9″S 148°34′41″E
- Area: 517 km^{2} (200 sq mi)
- Established: 1941
- Governing body: Queensland Parks and Wildlife Service
- Website: Official website

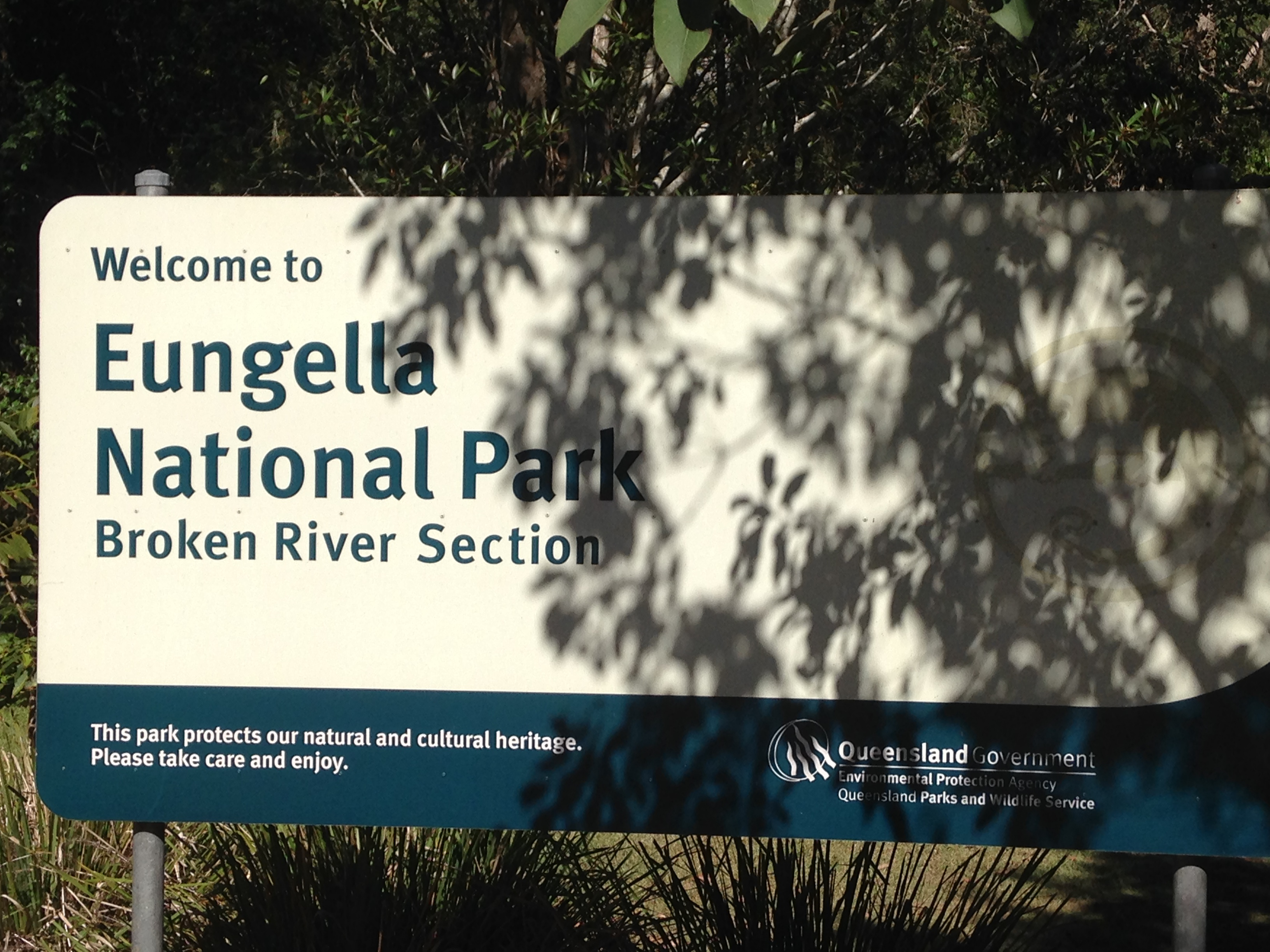
Sign at the entrance to Eungella National Park

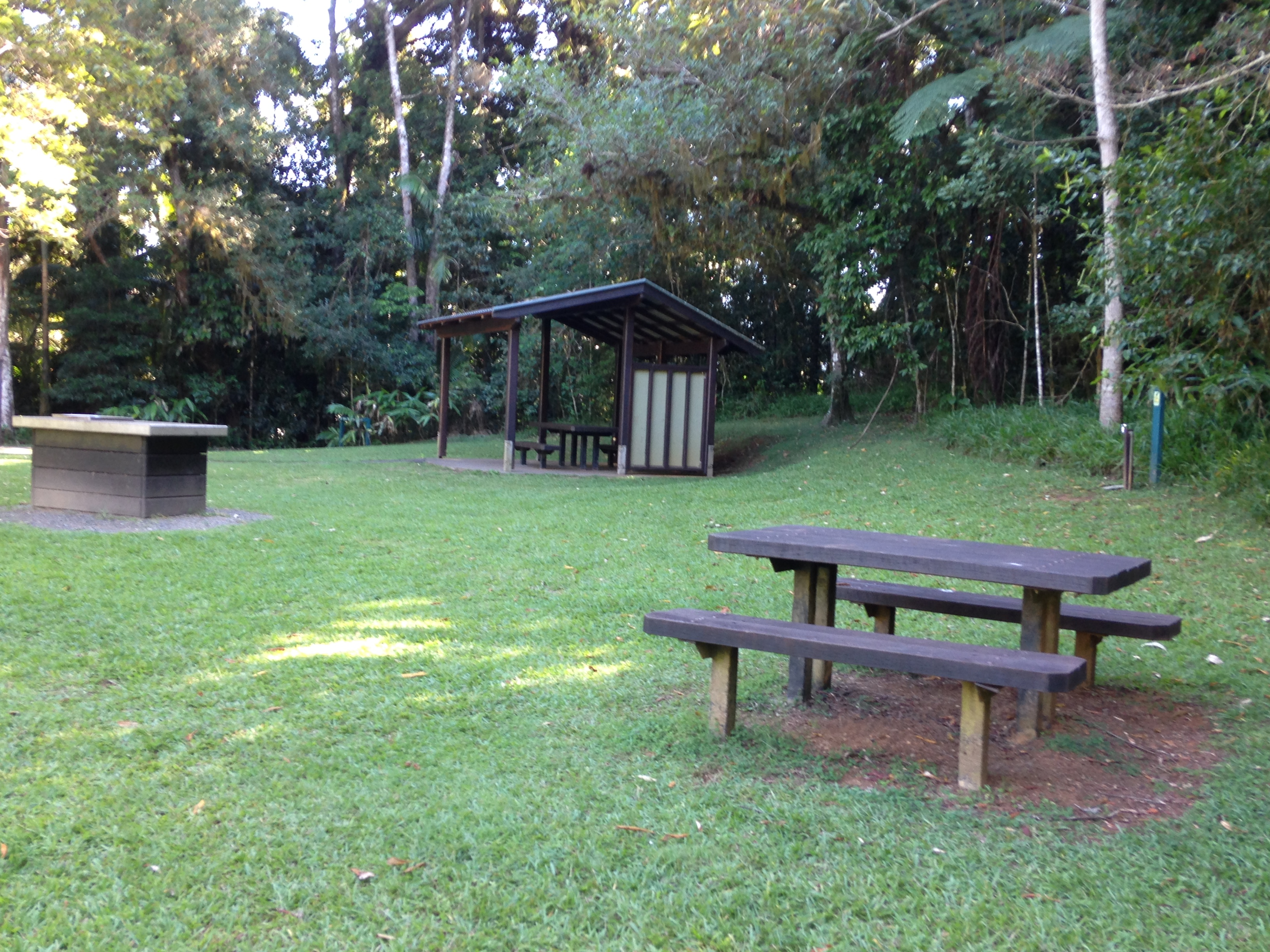
Day use areas for visitors to Eungella National Park are well used and well maintained

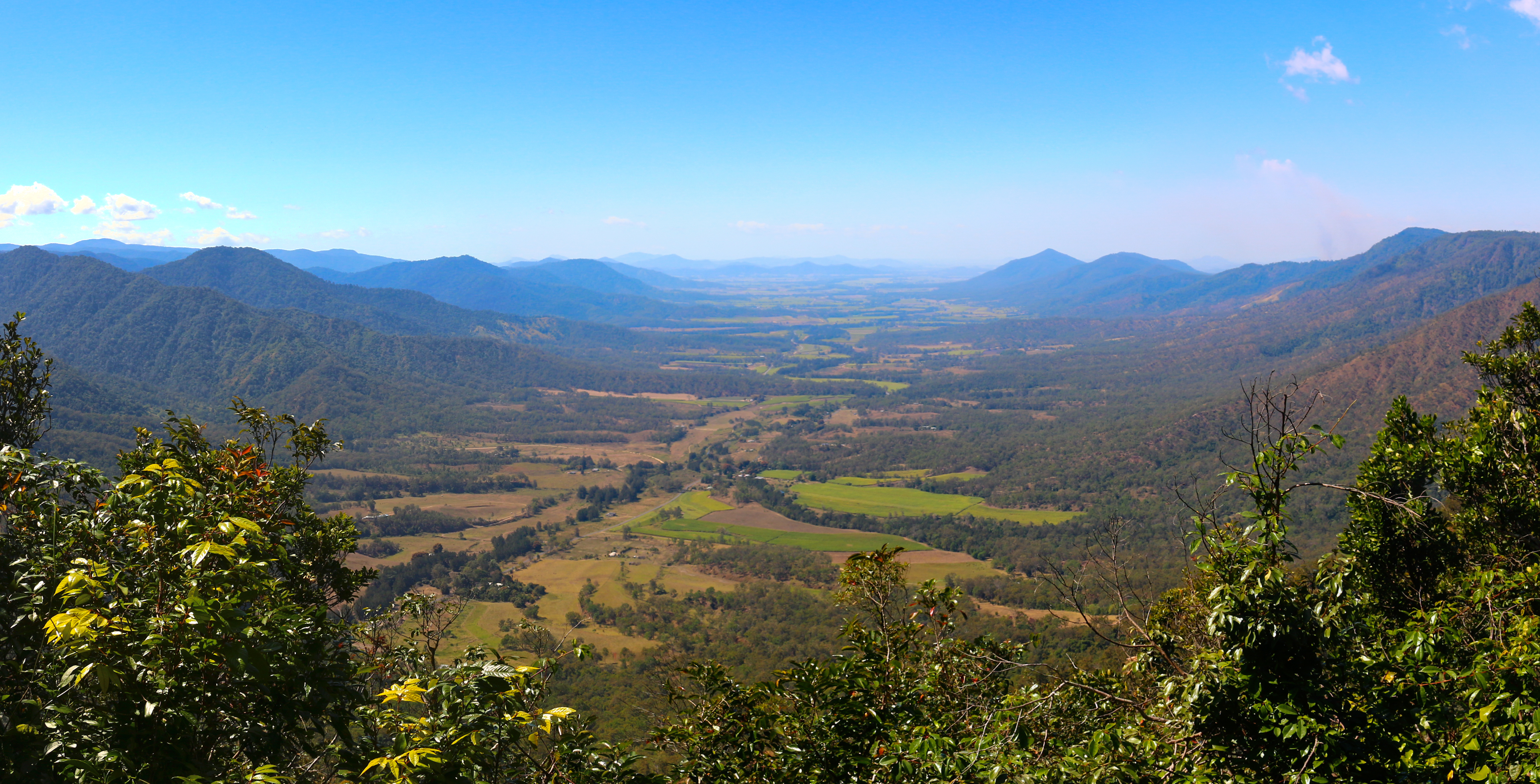
View down the Pioneer Valley from sky window

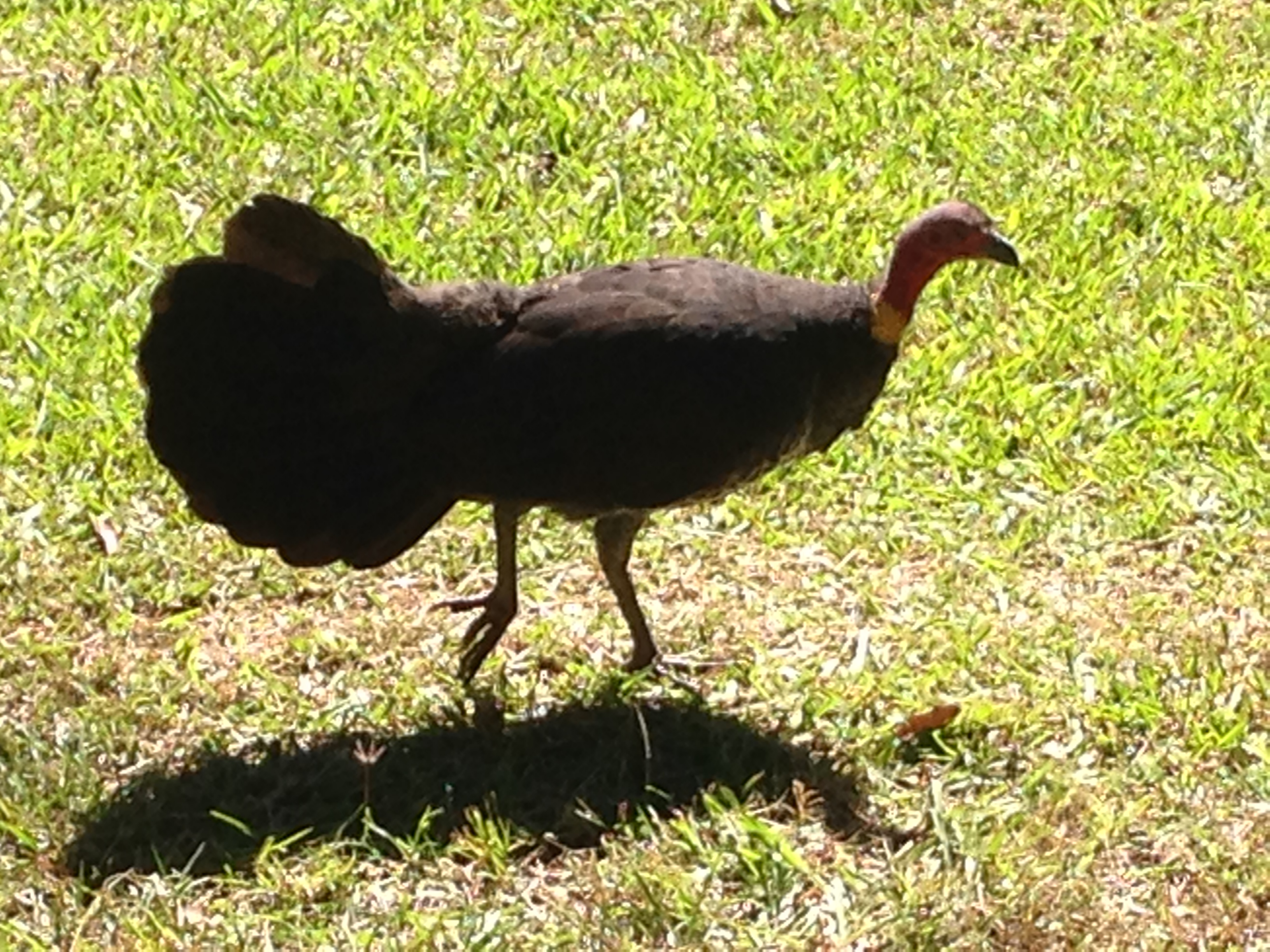
Australian brushturkeys are common in the rainforest and day use areas at Eungella National Park

Eungella National Park (/ˈjʌŋɡɛlə/ YUNG-gel-ə; meaning "Land of the clouds") is a protected area in Queensland, Australia. It is on the Clarke Range at the end of the Pioneer Valley 80 km west of Mackay, and 858 km northwest of Brisbane. Eungella is noted for the national park which surrounds it. It is considered to be the longest continual stretch of sub-tropical rainforest in Australia. The original inhabitants are the Wirri people. The park is covered by dense rainforest and is known for its platypuses.

== Regional description ==
Eungella National Park is located on an isolated massif about 80 km west of Mackay in North–central Queensland. The Eungella Plateau rises to 1259m at Mt Dalrymple and to similar elevation at Mt William, forming part of the Clarke Range. The park preserves about half (30,000 ha) the area of rainforest present at the time of European settlement, which has been much reduced by logging. Rainforest in the National Park ranges from high elevation, notophyll vine forest to low elevation mesophyll forests at the base of the ranges. Notophyll vine forest with tall eucalypts such as red stringybark (Eucalyptus resinifera) is found on the ridges of eastern facing slopes and drier western slopes often contain hoop pine (Araucaria cunninghamii). The rainforests of the Eungella massif represent one of the most isolated patches of this vegetation type in Australia. The rainforest is bordered by eucalypt forests and woodlands across much of its extent.

== History and climate ==
Eungella National Park was declared over 49,610 hectares in 1941. In 1986 the National Park was extended to include land at Mt Beatrice and a small area of former State Forest near Finch Hatton, so that today the park encompasses 52,900 ha.

The word Eungella is an aboriginal name meaning 'land of the cloud' and with an average annual rainfall of 2240mm, it often seems perched in a cloud. The temperature is generally around five degrees cooler than the surrounding lowlands.

== Endemic species ==
Eungella National Park is recognised as a centre of endemism for Australian rainforest species. There were three key refuge areas in mid-east Queensland during past periods of rainforest contraction. The most important is thought to have been in the Clarke Range and Eungella National Park area, which support many endemic species, including a spiny crayfish, Euastacus eungella (Eungella spiny crayfish); a leaf-tailed gecko, Phyllurus nepthys (Eungella leaf-tailed gecko); a skink, Tumbunascincus luteilateralis (orange-spotted forest-skink); a honeyeater, Bolemoreus hindwoodi (Eungella honeyeater); and three frogs, Taudactylus liemi (Eungella tinker frog), Taudactylus eungellensis (Eungella torrent frog or Eungella dayfrog) and Rheobatrachus vitellinus (northern gastric-brooding frog).

== Flora ==
A total of 16 species of fungi, 19 mosses, 4 conifers, 92 ferns, 299 dicots and 54 monocots are recorded as occurring in the National Park. Much of the rainforest in the National Park is complex mesophyll vine forest with pockets of simple and complex notophyll vine forests on poorer soils. Many of the vegetation communities including rainforests, vine thickets and vine forests are considered fire sensitive.

=== Dicots ===
Elaeocarpus largiflorens is a rainforest tree reaching 30 m in height which occurs in the wet tropics from sea level to 1200 m elevation and is at the southern limit of its natural range at Eungella. It produces 20 mm long fruits that are eaten and dispersed by a range of frugivorous vertebrates. The Eungella hairy daisy (Ozothamnus eriocephalus) is a shrub species with very limited range, currently listed as vulnerable at both state and federal levels. Omphalea celata is a small tree currently listed as vulnerable at a state and federal level, which was first described in 1994 and is found at Hazlewood Gorge within the park. It is a host plant for the zodiac moth (Alcides metaurus).

=== Ferns ===
In the southern half of Queensland, the giant fern (Angiopteris evecta) is found in only four widely spaced sites, including Eungella, which may indicate a past wider distribution when Queensland was much wetter. This species needs a highly-reliable water supply and high humidity to sustain its enormous fronds. The vulnerable Dryopteris sparsa is also found in the park.

== Fauna ==
Over 175 species of mammals, reptiles, birds and amphibians have been recorded in the park.

=== Birds ===
111 species of birds have been recorded in Eungella National Park. The Eungella honeyeater (Lichenostomus hindwoodi) is endemic to the highland rainforest of the Clarke Range, including the park. It can be distinguished from it is close relative and sister species the bridled honeyeater (Lichenostomus frenata) by its plumage colour and markings, size, bill colour and calls. It was first collected in 1975 and described in 1983, making it the most recently described Australian bird species. It occurs in the park, and also feeds in adjacent eucalypt woodlands.

The red-necked crake (Rallina tricolor), previously thought to only occur as far south as Townsville, was first observed in the park in 1981. The buff-breasted paradise kingfisher (Tanysiptera sylvia) and the white-browed robin (Poecilodryas superciliosa) are at the southern extent of their distribution at Eungella. The regent bowerbird (Sericulus chrysocephalus) occurs at its northern limit in the park and surrounding area, as do the brown thornbill (Acanthiza pusilla) and the glossy black cockatoo (Calyptorhynchus lathami). Australian swiftlets (Aerodramus terraereginae) breed in caves in the Finch Hatton Creek area, and one of the few Australian records of glossy swiftlet (Collocalia esculenta) was in the park.

=== Amphibians ===
A total of 16 amphibian species have been recorded in the park. Globally, amphibians have undergone rapid and extensive decline in recent decades, due in part to habitat loss and pollution, but unknown factors threaten almost half the species in decline. Amphibians are more threatened and are declining more rapidly than either birds or mammals. An exotic and highly-virulent pathogen may be contributing to the decline of rainforest frog species in eastern Australia. The causative agent may be the chytrid fungus Batrachochytrium dendrobatidis, although this has not as yet been detected in stream-dwelling frogs in the park.

Eungella National Park is recognised as one of eleven areas with high levels of frog endemism. Of the three endemic frog species endemic, two are still believed to exist today, the Eungella dayfrog and the Eungella tinker frog, while one species, the northern gastric brooding frog, is believed extinct. All three species are ground dwelling and their distribution is restricted to streams or areas close to streams in mid to high elevation rainforests.

The Eungella dayfrog was previously more common, but has declined in number and distribution in recent decades, and is now considered endangered at a state and federal level. The peak breeding period for this species is between January and May, but tadpoles at all sizes and developmental stages can be found throughout the year. This frog is one of only two species known to use body language, including small hops and movements of the arms and legs, to attract the attention of other frogs; a behaviour which may have evolved due to the noise of mountain streams rushing over rocks in its habitat making calling a less effective means of communication.

The Eungella tinkerfrog is considered near threatened in Queensland. It occurs between 180 and 1250m elevation, but is sparsely distributed and rarely seen. Potential threats to this species include forest grazing, trampling by livestock, introduced species such as the cane toad (Rhinella marina) and the chytrid fungus.

The northern gastric brooding frog (Rheobatrachus vitellinus) was discovered in January 1984, but has not been seen since March 1985 and is believed to be extinct. It is one of only two species in the world known to brood its young in its stomach, with the mother swallowing fertilised eggs or early larval stages, before 'giving birth' through the mouth. Its distribution was exclusively undisturbed rainforest within Eungella National Park at altitudes of 400–1000m, before it underwent a sudden range contraction and disappeared.

=== Mammals ===
28 species of mammals have been recorded in the park. This includes several bat species including the little bent-wing bat (Miniopterus australis), eastern horseshoe bat (Rhinolophus megaphyllus), common blossom bat (Syconycteris australis), eastern forest bat (Vespadelus pumilus), eastern long-eared bat (Nyctophilus bifax) and grey-headed flying-fox (Pteropus poliocephalus).

Platypus (Ornithorhynchus anatinus) are often seen at the viewing platform at Broken River which is the most visited location in the park. They have an unusual foraging behaviour and are the only mammal known to use electrolocation for detecting prey. Platypus are generally found in slow-moving rivers and small pools and are highly adapted to a semi-aquatic life. They have extremely dense fur, large webs on their feet extending well beyond the toenails, a broad, flat tail and excellent swimming ability, paddling with their forelegs in alternating strokes, with their hindlegs and tail trailing behind. When foraging, captured prey is stored in two cheek pouches and later masticated and swallowed when the platypus surfaces. An apparent feeding association has been noted between the azure kingfisher (Ceyx azureus) and the platypus at Eungella National Park, where the birds have been observed watching for fish disturbed by the platypus, before diving into the water in search of prey.

=== Reptiles ===
20 species of reptiles occur in the park. Three species of leaf-tailed geckos (Phyllurus ossa, P. isis and P. nepthys) occur in small rainforest patches in and around the park. P. nepthys is endemic to the Clarke Range. The recently discovered orange-sided rainforest skink (Tumbunascincus luteilateralis) is endemic to the area, and is restricted to upland rainforest above 900m in moist areas which contain rotting logs and palm fronds.The upland rainforest above 800m is home to another endemic species, saproscincus eungellensis The skink species Lampropholis basiliscus reaches its southern limit at Eungella.

=== Insects ===
There are several endemic or range-restricted insect species found in Eungella National Park. A study of the order Diptera (flies) in seven rainforest locations found that the long-isolated, high elevation, rain-forested massif at Eungella were a unique entity in the analyses, characterized by high numbers of Chironomidae, Psychodidae, Tipulidae and Empididae. Flies in the genus Cyamops including; C. pectinatus, C. dayi, C. delta and C. pectiatus have been collected in damp areas in the park including near streams, waterfalls and marshes. The fly species Drosophila birchii is restricted to patches of warm, wet tropical rainforest between New Guinea and Eungella.

The katydid Phricta zwicka has been collected from Eungella National Park. The Megalopteran Protochauliodes eungella is known only from the Eungella area. Two new species from the order Odonata were collected in the Eungella area; Austroaeschna christine and A. eungella. A survey of butterflies in the park undertaken in 1993 recorded 37 species with an additional 15 species known from museum and private records.

=== Crustaceans ===
The Eungella spiny crayfish is unique to the creeks on the Clarke Range. It is listed as critically endangered due to its limited range, fragmented distribution, habitat decline due to exotic species, such as feral pigs (Sus scrofa), red foxes (Vulpes vulpes), feral cats (Felis catus) and cane toads, and its vulnerability to climate change.

== Environmental threats ==
Threats to the biodiversity of Eungella National Park include habitat fragmentation, the effects of introduced species, fire and human impacts.

=== Pest plants and animals ===
Many introduced animals have been recorded in the park including the cane toad, red fox, feral cat, rabbit (Oryctolagus cuniculus), black rat (Rattus rattus), house mouse (Mus musculus), and feral pig. Pigs disturb the ground, promoting the spread of weeds, remove natural recruitment of flora and fauna and can be vectors for pathogens such as cinnamon fungus (Phytopthera cinnamomi). Cinnamon fungus has been found on the Clarke Range, including in one area of Dalrymple Heights, where approximately 20% of the rainforest has died.

Cats, foxes and feral dogs (Canis familiaris) can threaten native fauna through predation, competition for resources and transmission of disease. In Australia, cats are known to prey on 186 native bird species, 64 mammal species, 87 species of reptile, 10 species of amphibians and numerous invertebrates. Foxes prey on possums, small dasyurids, native rats, and other mammals, birds and insects. Feral dogs hunt alone or in packs and can prey on larger mammals such as wallabies. Road construction and fragmentation of habitat can expose local populations of native animals to predation by exotic predators that may otherwise have difficulties penetrating dense forest environments. Much of Eungella National Park is accessible only by walking tracks, which may limit feral animal spread, but may make control more difficult.

Weeds including lantana (Lantana camara), blue morning glory (Ipomoea indica) and red Natal grass (Melinis repens) are common on the disturbed edges of the park and roadsides. Lantana is a Class 3 Pest in the state of Queensland, and is recognised as a weed of national significance (Mackay Regional Pest Management Group 2013). Other highly-flammable weeds common in the park include guinea grass (Megathyrsus maximus), rat's tail grasses (Sporobolus spp.), para grass (Urochloa mutica) and molasses grass (Melinis minutiflora).

=== Fire ===
Fire is a key disturbing pressure on the rainforests of Eungella National Park, and can result in fragmentation of the rainforest into smaller areas less capable of maintaining the present complexity of plants and animals and increasing edge effects. The rainforest, vine thicket, vine forest and riparian communities found in the park do not require fire for regeneration, and it may irreversibly alter the species composition and community structure, simplifying ecosystems and reducing floristic and structural diversity. Fire can also reduce litter, fallen logs and hollow-bearing trees which provide critical habitat for some species.

== Management ==
Eungella National Park is managed by the Queensland Department of National Parks, Sport and Racing. There is currently no management plan for the park. National Parks are managed to provide for the permanent preservation of the area's natural condition and the protection of the area's cultural resources and values. Other management principles for National Parks are to present the park's cultural and natural resources and their values and to ensure that park use is nature based and ecologically sustainable.

== Economic benefits ==
National parks and other protected areas have traditionally been created and funded primarily to provide conservation benefits, but they can also provide economic benefits, particularly in rural and regional areas, through job creation and visitor spending. A visitor survey conducted in 2001 estimated that visitors to Eungella National Park spend $10.9 million in the local region annually.

== Facilities ==
Camping is permitted at Fern Flat campground, which is accessible by walking only. The Broken River picnic area has facilities for day visitors.

There are more than 20 km of bushwalking tracks, some with scenic lookouts. A platform on the Broken River provides good viewing of platypus, eels and turtles.

== See also ==
- Protected areas of Queensland
