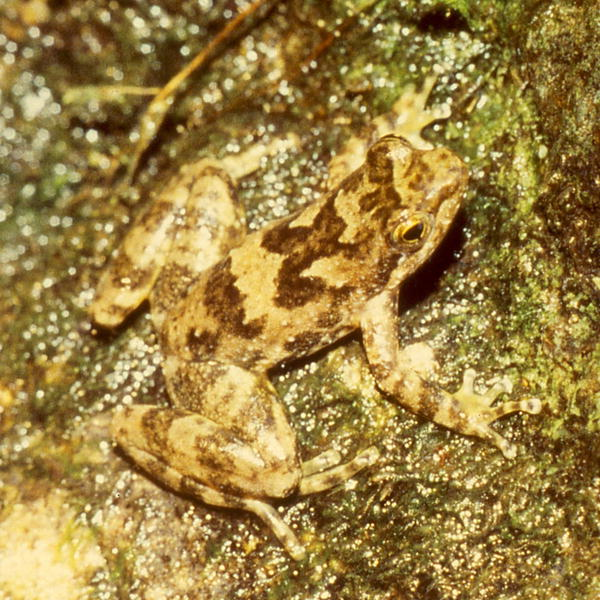

Conservation status
- Endangered (IUCN 3.1)

Scientific classification
- Kingdom: Animalia
- Phylum: Chordata
- Class: Amphibia
- Order: Anura
- Family: Myobatrachidae
- Genus: Taudactylus
- Species: T. eungellensis

Binomial name
- Taudactylus eungellensis Liem & Hosmer, 1973
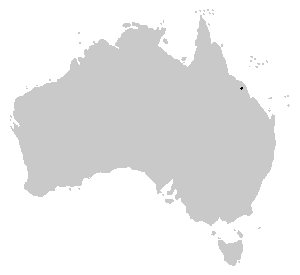

= Eungella torrent frog =

Species of amphibian

The Eungella torrent frog or Eungella day frog (Taudactylus eungellensis) is a species of stream dwelling frog endemic to Australia. It is restricted to ranges west of Mackay in mid-eastern Queensland.

== Description ==
It is a relatively small frog reaching 35 mm (1.38 in) in length. The head and body are slender and the limbs are long and lean. The dorsum ranges from yellowish-tan to dark brown in colour with darker mottling. There is an X-shaped marking on the back. The front half of the head is usually lighter than the back half and the arms and legs have banding. The toes and feet have wedge-shaped pads and no webbing. The back is smooth or granular with a few low warts. The belly is smooth and deep yellow. The irises are restricted horizontally and are golden. The tympanum is indistinct.

== Ecology and behaviour ==
This frog inhabits montane rainforest and tall open forests. It is found in and around flowing creeks. If alarmed, the Eungella torrent frog may jump into a creek where it will hide beneath rocks until the danger has passed. Breeding may occur all year round, but is most intense from November to December. Males make a soft tinkering sound barely audible over the sound of cascading water. Eggs are laid in clumps of 30–50. They are attached to the under the surface of submerged rocks or logs. The Eungella torrent frog is the only Myobatrachidae that is known to advertise its presence by the movement of its body and limbs. It is suspected that these movements are a form of courtship. These movements include: flicking and waving of legs, head bobbing, and distinctive hops.

This species is the only known Australian frog to go through an apparent period of absence, only to later reappear. The Eungella torrent frog was first noted to be in decline in the 1980s. From 1987 to 1992, the frog was not encountered, despite surveys. From 1992 onwards, it has been rediscovered at nine sites, and populations appear to be slowly on the rise. Although these results are encouraging, populations have not rebounded to what they were before the decline, when they were still considered common. The cause for decline is believed to be the chytrid fungus Batrachochytrium dendrobatidis; however, the frogs now seem to be able to coexist with the fungus that once caused their near extinction.

== Conservation status ==
It is listed as Endangered on the IUCN Red List, and as "Endangered" under Queensland's Nature Conservation (Animals) Regulation (2020).
