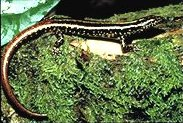
- Ornithuroscincus noctua

Scientific classification
- Kingdom: Animalia
- Phylum: Chordata
- Class: Reptilia
- Order: Squamata
- Family: Scincidae
- Subfamily: Sphenomorphinae
- Genus: Ornithuroscincus; Slavenko, Tamar, Tallowin, Kraus, Allison, Carranza, & Meiri, 2021

Type species
- Lobulia sabini Kraus, 2020

Species
- 9, see text.

= Ornithuroscincus =

Genus of lizards

Ornithuroscincus is a genus of skinks, lizards in the family Scincidae. All but one species are endemic to New Guinea: in addition to northern New Guinea, Ornithuroscincus noctua occurs on many Pacific islands.

== Taxonomy ==
The genus Ornithuroscincus was erected in 2021 in the revision of the then-polyphyletic genus Lobulia. Its closest relative in Alpinoscincus.

== Description ==
Ornithuroscincus are small to medium-sized skinks with adult snout–vent length of 29–69 mm (1.1–2.7 in). The limbs are short. They are ovoviviparous with 1–3 offspring in each litter.

== Habitat ==
They are terrestrial to semi-arboreal. Most species have restricted ranges in mountainous areas, but some species are widespread and occur in lowland areas.

== Species ==
The following species are recognized as being valid:

- Ornithuroscincus albodorsalis (T. Vogt, 1932)
- Ornithuroscincus bengaun Slavenko, Tamar, Tallowin, Kraus, Allison, Carranza, & Meiri, 2021
- Ornithuroscincus inornatus Slavenko, Tamar, Tallowin, Kraus, Allison, Carranza, & Meiri, 2021
- Ornithuroscincus noctua (Lesson, 1830) – moth skink
- Ornithuroscincus nototaenia (Boulenger, 1914)
- Ornithuroscincus pterophilus Slavenko, Tamar, Tallowin, Kraus, Allison, Carranza, & Meiri, 2021
- Ornithuroscincus sabini (Kraus, 2020)
- Ornithuroscincus shearmani Slavenko, Tamar, Tallowin, Kraus, Allison, Carranza, & Meiri, 2021
- Ornithuroscincus viridis Slavenko, Tamar, Tallowin, Kraus, Allison, Carranza, & Meiri, 2021

Nota bene: A binomial authority in parentheses indicates that the species was originally described in a genus other than Ornithuroscincus.
