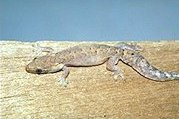
- Lepidodactylus lugubris

Scientific classification
- Kingdom: Animalia
- Phylum: Chordata
- Class: Reptilia
- Order: Squamata
- Suborder: Gekkota
- Family: Gekkonidae
- Subfamily: Gekkoninae
- Genus: Lepidodactylus; Fitzinger, 1843

Type species
- Platydactylus lugubris Duméril & Bibron, 1836

Species
- See text

= Lepidodactylus =

Genus of lizards

Lepidodactylus is a large genus of geckos, commonly known as scaly-toed geckos and closely related to house geckos or dtellas.

== Geographic range ==
Species in the genus Lepidodactylus are found from Southeast Asia to Indo-Australia and Oceania.

== Species ==
There are 44 described species in this genus, which are considered valid.

Species	Taxon author ‡	Common name
Lepidodactylus aignanus	Kraus, 2019	
Lepidodactylus aureolineatus	Taylor, 1915	golden scaly-toed gecko, yellow-lined smooth-scaled gecko
Lepidodactylus babuyanensis	Eliades, R.M. Brown, Huang & Siler, 2021	
Lepidodactylus bakingibut	Eliades, Brown, Huang & Siler, 2021	
Lepidodactylus balioburius	Ota & Crombie, 1989	Batan scaly-toed gecko
Lepidodactylus bisakol	Eliades, Brown, Huang & Siler, 2021	
Lepidodactylus buleli	Ineich, 2008	(no common name)
Lepidodactylus christiani	Taylor, 1917	Christian's scaly-toed gecko
Lepidodactylus dialeukos	Kraus, 2019	
Lepidodactylus euaensis	J.R.H. Gibbons & W.C. Brown, 1988	Eua scaly-toed gecko, Eua forest gecko
Lepidodactylus flaviocularis	W.C. Brown, M. McCoy & Rodda, 1992	yellow-eyed scaly-toed gecko, yellow-eyed gecko
Lepidodactylus gardineri	Boulenger, 1897	Rotuman forest Gecko
Lepidodactylus guppyi	Boulenger, 1884	Solomon scaly-toed gecko, Guppy's gecko
Lepidodactylus herrei Subspecies Lepidodactylus herrei herrei Taylor, 1923 Lepidodactylus herrei medianus W.C. Brown & Alcala, 1978	Taylor, 1923	Negros scaly-toed gecko, white-lined smooth-scaled gecko
Lepidodactylus intermedius	Darevsky, 1964	(no common name)
Lepidodactylus kwasnickae	Kraus, 2019	
Lepidodactylus labialis	(W. Peters, 1867)	Mindanao false gecko, dark-spotted smooth-scaled gecko
Lepidodactylus listeri	(Boulenger, 1889)	Christmas Island chained gecko, Lister's gecko
Lepidodactylus lombocensis	Mertens, 1929	(no common name)
Lepidodactylus lugubris	(A.M.C. Duméril & Bibron, 1836)	mourning gecko, common smooth-scaled gecko
Lepidodactylus magnus	W.C. Brown & F. Parker, 1977	mountain scaly-toed gecko
Lepidodactylus manni	Schmidt, 1923	Fiji scaly-toed gecko, Viti forest gecko
Lepidodactylus mitchelli	Kraus, 2019	
Lepidodactylus moestus	(W. Peters, 1867)	(no common name)
Lepidodactylus mutahi	W.C. Brown & F. Parker, 1977	Bougainville's scaly-toed gecko
Lepidodactylus nakahiwalay	Eliades, Brown, Huang & Siler, 2021	
Lepidodactylus novaeguineae	W.C. Brown & F. Parker, 1977	New Guinea scaly-toed gecko
Lepidodactylus oligoporus	Buden, 2007	Mortlock Islands scaly-toed gecko
Lepidodactylus oorti	(Kopstein, 1926)	(no common name)
Lepidodactylus orientalis	W.C. Brown & F. Parker, 1977	Oriental scaly-toed gecko
Lepidodactylus pantai	Stubbs, Karin, Arifin, Iskandar, Arida, Reilly, Bloch, Kusnadi & McGuire, 2017	beach scaly-toed gecko
Lepidodactylus paurolepis	Ota et al., 1995	Seventy Islands gecko
Lepidodactylus planicauda	Stejneger, 1905	Mindanao scaly-toed gecko, small broad-tailed smooth-scaled gecko
Lepidodactylus pollostos	Karkkainen, Richards, Kraus, Tjaturadi, Krey & P. Oliver, 2020	(no common name)
Lepidodactylus pulcher	Boulenger, 1885	Wild scaly-toed gecko, Admiralty gecko
Lepidodactylus pumilus	(Boulenger, 1885)	slender chained gecko
Lepidodactylus ranauensis	Ota & Hikida, 1988	Sabah scaly-toed gecko
Lepidodactylus sacrolineatus	Kraus & Oliver, 2020	(no common name)
Lepidodactylus shebae	(W.C. Brown & V.M. Tanner, 1949)	Guadalcanal scaly-toed gecko
Lepidodactylus tepukapili	Zug, Watling, T. Alefaio, S. Alefaio & Ludescher, 2003	(no common name)
Lepidodactylus vanuatuensis	Ota, Fisher, Ineich, Case, Radtkey & Zug, 1998	(no common name)
Lepidodactylus woodfordi	Boulenger, 1887	Woodford's scaly-toed gecko
Lepidodactylus yami	Ota, 1987	Lanyu scaly-toed gecko
Lepidodactylus zweifeli	Kraus, 2019	

‡ Nota bene: A taxon author (binomial authority) in parentheses indicates that the species was originally described in a genus other than Lepidodactylus.

== Eponyms ==
The specific name, browni, is in honor of American herpetologist Walter Creighton Brown.

The specific name, christiani, is in honor of U.S. Army Lieutenant Ralph L. Christian.

The specific name, gardineri, is in honor of British zoologist John Stanley Gardiner.

The specific name, guppyi, is in honor of British naturalist Henry Brougham Guppy.

The specific name, herrei, is in honor of American ichthyologist Albert William Herre.

The specific name, manni, is in honor of American entomologist William Montana Mann.

The specific name, oorti, is in honor of Dutch ornithologist Eduard Daniël van Oort.

The specific name, woodfordi, is in honor of British naturalist Charles Morris Woodford.
