= Hoya inconspicua =

Conservation status
- Near Threatened (NCA)

Scientific classification
- Kingdom: Plantae
- Clade: Tracheophytes
- Clade: Angiosperms
- Clade: Eudicots
- Clade: Asterids
- Order: Gentianales
- Family: Apocynaceae
- Genus: Hoya
- Species: H. inconspicua

Binomial name
- Hoya inconspicua Hemsl.

Species of plant

Hoya inconspicua is a species of flowering plant in the Apocynaceae or dogbane family and is native to the Bismarck Archipelago, New Guinea, Queensland, the Santa Cruz Islands, the Solomon Islands and Vanuatu. It was first formally described in 1894 by William Hemsley in the Bulletin of Miscellaneous Information from specimens collected by Henry B. Guppy. It is listed in Queensland as "near threatened" under the Queensland Government Nature Conservation Act 1992.
