= Lepidodactylus orientalis =

Conservation status
- Least Concern (IUCN 3.1)

Scientific classification
- Kingdom: Animalia
- Phylum: Chordata
- Class: Reptilia
- Order: Squamata
- Suborder: Gekkota
- Family: Gekkonidae
- Genus: Lepidodactylus
- Species: L. orientalis

Binomial name
- Lepidodactylus orientalis Brown & Parker, 1977

Synonyms
- Lepidodactylus browni Pernetta & Black, 1983

Species of lizard

Lepidodactylus orientalis, also known as the oriental scaly-toed gecko, is a species of gecko. It is endemic to southeast Papua New Guinea. It is known from the National Capital District and the Central Province at elevations below 665 m (2,182 ft).

== Taxonomy ==
Recent analysis by Kraus and colleagues showed that Lepidodactylus browni (Brown's scaly-toed gecko)y, a taxon still listed by IUCN as "data deficient", is a synonym of Lepidodactylus orientalis. The two show subtle morphological differences and minimal genetic differentiation. Kraus and colleagues suggest that morphological differences could relate to adaptations to different habitats, respectively rugose bark of mangrove trees in L. browni and smooth bark of Eucalyptus in L. orientalis.

The specific name orientalis refers to the eastern distribution of Lepidodactylus orientalis within New Guinea, whereas browni honors Walter Creighton Brown (1913–2002), American herpetologist.

== Description ==
Lepidodactylus orientalis measure 32–48 mm (1.3–1.9 in) in snout–vent length, with females on average being larger than males. It is oviparous.

== Habitat and conservation ==
Lepidodactylus orientalis is primarily known from savanna-monsoon forest habitats around Port Moresby, whereas the former Lepidodactylus browni is associated with mangroves. It is nocturnal.

Mangrove habitats are under increasing threat from urban development, and in disturbed, urbanized areas L. orientalis is replaced by the human commensal Lepidodactylus lugubris. As a species, however, L. orientalis is not facing major threats. It is common in savanna habitats.
