= C. robustus =

C. robustus may refer to:

- Callulops robustus, a frog species found in Indonesia and Papua New Guinea
- Campephilus robustus, the robust woodpecker, a bird species found in Argentina, Brazil and Paraguay
- Chaetodon robustus, the three-banded butterflyfish, a fish species endemic to Cape Verde
- Cisticola robustus, the stout cisticola, a bird species found in Africa

== Synonyms ==
- Crocodylus robustus, a synonym for Voay robustus, an extinct crocodilian species found from Madagascar
