= Lepidodactylus kwasnickae =

Conservation status
- Endangered (IUCN 3.1)

Scientific classification
- Kingdom: Animalia
- Phylum: Chordata
- Class: Reptilia
- Order: Squamata
- Suborder: Gekkota
- Family: Gekkonidae
- Genus: Lepidodactylus
- Species: L. kwasnickae

Binomial name
- Lepidodactylus kwasnickae Kraus, 2019
- Lepidodactylus kwasnickae is only known from the Woodlark Island, Papua New Guinea

Species of lizard

Lepidodactylus kwasnickae is a species of gecko. It is endemic to Woodlark Island, Papua New Guinea.

== Description ==
Adults measure 42–50 mm (1.7–2.0 in) in snout–vent length.

== Habitat and conservation ==
Lepidodactylus kwasnickae occur in densely shaded primary or mature secondary forest, where they inhabit axils of Pandanus plants. In disturbed areas it appears to be replaced by Lepidodactylus lugubris. It might be an obligate forest dweller, which makes it vulnerable to logging for oil palm and to open areas for mining.
