= Lepidodactylus pollostos =

Conservation status
- Data Deficient (IUCN 3.1)

Scientific classification
- Kingdom: Animalia
- Phylum: Chordata
- Class: Reptilia
- Order: Squamata
- Suborder: Gekkota
- Family: Gekkonidae
- Genus: Lepidodactylus
- Species: L. pollostos

Binomial name
- Lepidodactylus pollostos Karkkainen, Richards, Kraus, Tjaturadi, Krey, & Oliver, 2020

Species of lizard

Lepidodactylus pollostos is a species of gecko. It is endemic to Salawati Island, one of the Raja Ampat Islands, Indonesia. Its true range might extend into the Vogelkop Peninsula in the adjacent mainland New Guinea.

It is a very small species of Lepidodactylus, with an adult size of about 35 mm (1.4 in) in snout–vent length. The only known specimen, a male, was collected in lowland rainforest from a tree at 75 m (246 ft) above sea level.
