= Callulops dubius =

Conservation status
- Data Deficient (IUCN 3.1)

Scientific classification
- Kingdom: Animalia
- Phylum: Chordata
- Class: Amphibia
- Order: Anura
- Family: Microhylidae
- Genus: Callulops
- Species: C. dubius

Binomial name
- Callulops dubius (Boettger, 1895)

Species of frog

Callulops dubius is a species of frog in the family Microhylidae. It is endemic to Indonesia. Its natural habitat is subtropical or tropical moist lowland forests.
