= Bougainville's scaly-toed gecko =

Conservation status
- Data Deficient (IUCN 3.1)

Scientific classification
- Kingdom: Animalia
- Phylum: Chordata
- Class: Reptilia
- Order: Squamata
- Suborder: Gekkota
- Family: Gekkonidae
- Genus: Lepidodactylus
- Species: L. mutahi

Binomial name
- Lepidodactylus mutahi W. Brown & F. Parker, 1977
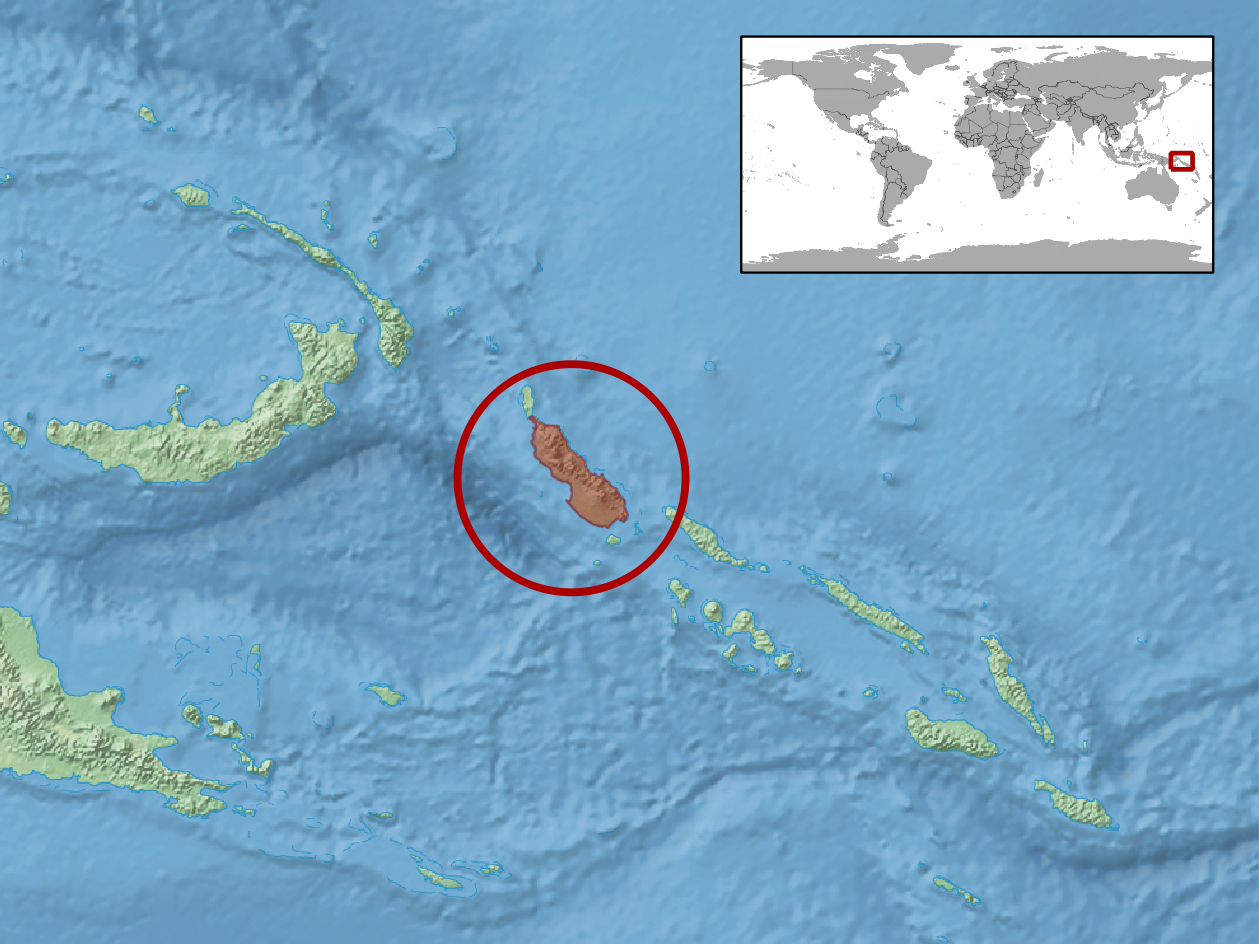

Species of lizard

Bougainville's scaly-toed gecko (Lepidodactylus mutahi) is a species of lizard in the family Gekkonidae. The species is endemic to Bougainville Island.

== Etymology ==
The specific name, mutahi, refers to the Mutahi area in northeastern Bougainville Island.

== Description ==
Adults of Lepidodactylus mutahi have a snout-to-vent length (SVL) of 3.7–5.6 centimetres (1.5–2.2 in). Adult males have a continuous series of 29–34 femoral/preanal/femoral pores extending almost from knee to knee.

== Habitat ==
The natural habitat of Lepidodactylus mutahi is forest, but it has also been found in artificial habitats such as gardens and banana plantations.

== Reproduction ==
Lepidodactylus mutahi is oviparous.
