= Beach scaly-toed gecko =

Scientific classification
- Kingdom: Animalia
- Phylum: Chordata
- Class: Reptilia
- Order: Squamata
- Suborder: Gekkota
- Family: Gekkonidae
- Genus: Lepidodactylus
- Species: L. pantai

Binomial name
- Lepidodactylus pantai Stubbs, Karin, Arifin, Iskandar, Arida, Reilly, Bloch, Kusnadi, & Mcuire, 2017

Species of lizard

The beach scaly-toed gecko (Lepidodactylus pantai) is a species of gecko. It is endemic to the Maluku Islands in Indonesia and was first described in 2017.
