= Lepidodactylus oorti =

Conservation status
- Data Deficient (IUCN 3.1)

Scientific classification
- Kingdom: Animalia
- Phylum: Chordata
- Class: Reptilia
- Order: Squamata
- Suborder: Gekkota
- Family: Gekkonidae
- Genus: Lepidodactylus
- Species: L. oorti

Binomial name
- Lepidodactylus oorti (Kopstein, 1926)
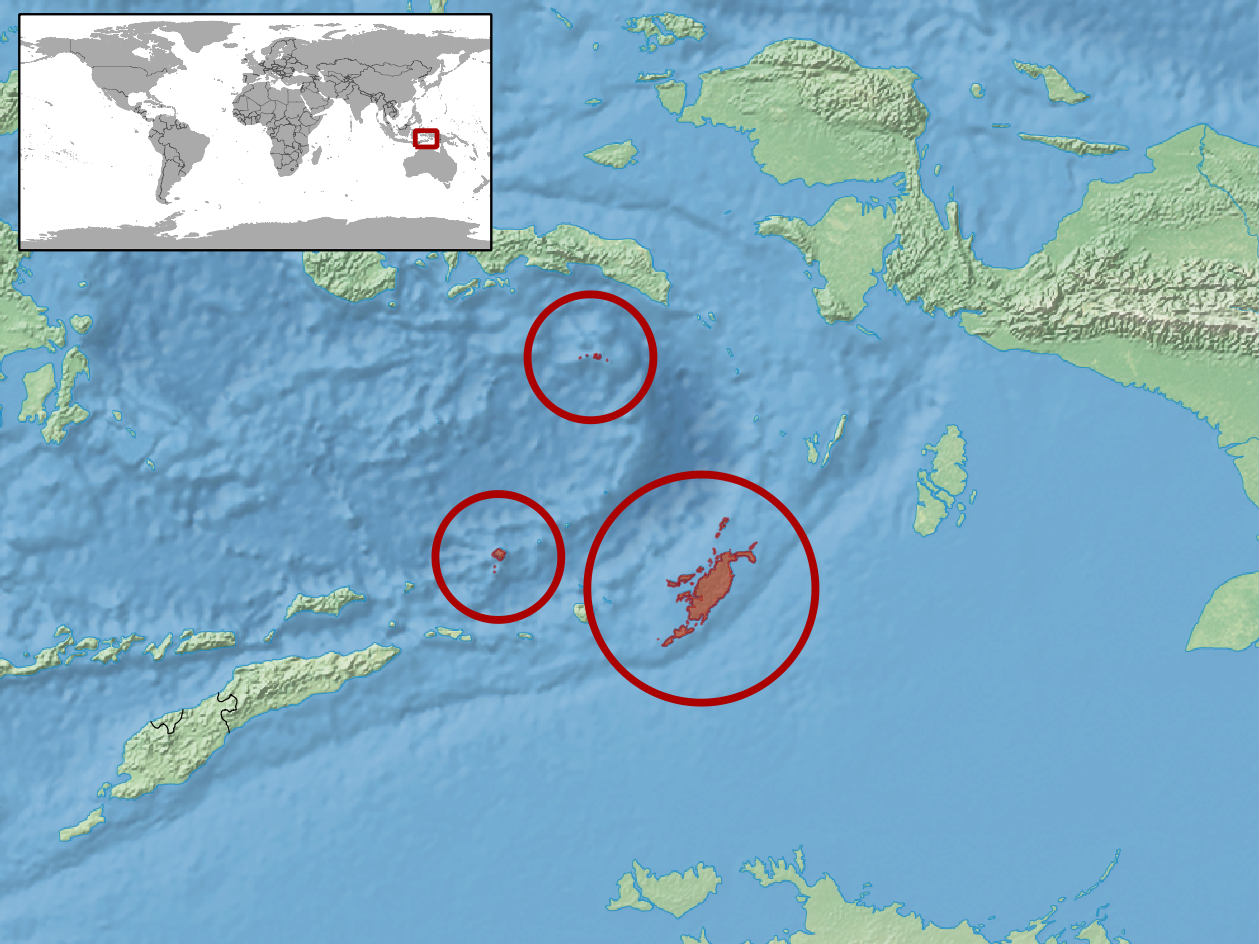

Synonyms
- Gekko oorti Kopstein, 1926; Lepidodactylus oorti — Kluge, 1993; Lepidodactylus oortii — Rösler, 2000

Species of lizard

Lepidodactylus oorti is a species of gecko, a lizard in the family Gekkonidae. The species is endemic to Indonesia.

== Etymology ==
The specific name, oorti, is in honor of Dutch ornithologist Eduard Daniël van Oort.

== Geographic range ==
Lepidodactylus oorti is found on the Banda, Damar, and Tanimbar Islands in Indonesia.

== Habitat ==
The preferred natural habitat of Lepidodactylus oorti is coastal mangrove forest.

== Behavior ==
Lepidodactylus oorti is arboreal.

== Diet ==
Lepidodactylus oorti preys upon insects.

== Reproduction ==
Lepidodactylus oorti is oviparous.
