= Ornithuroscincus nototaenia =

Conservation status
- Least Concern (IUCN 3.1)

Scientific classification
- Kingdom: Animalia
- Phylum: Chordata
- Class: Reptilia
- Order: Squamata
- Suborder: Scinciformata
- Infraorder: Scincomorpha
- Family: Scincidae
- Genus: Ornithuroscincus
- Species: O. nototaenia

Binomial name
- Ornithuroscincus nototaenia (Boulenger, 1914)

Species of lizard

Ornithuroscincus nototaenia is a species of skink found in Papua New Guinea.
