= Lepidodactylus dialeukos =

Scientific classification
- Kingdom: Animalia
- Phylum: Chordata
- Class: Reptilia
- Order: Squamata
- Suborder: Gekkota
- Family: Gekkonidae
- Genus: Lepidodactylus
- Species: L. dialeukos

Binomial name
- Lepidodactylus dialeukos Kraus, 2019

Species of lizard

Lepidodactylus dialeukos is a species of gecko. It is endemic to Indonesia.
