= Christian scaly-toed gecko =

Conservation status
- Least Concern (IUCN 3.1)

Scientific classification
- Kingdom: Animalia
- Phylum: Chordata
- Class: Reptilia
- Order: Squamata
- Suborder: Gekkota
- Family: Gekkonidae
- Genus: Lepidodactylus
- Species: L. christiani

Binomial name
- Lepidodactylus christiani Taylor, 1917
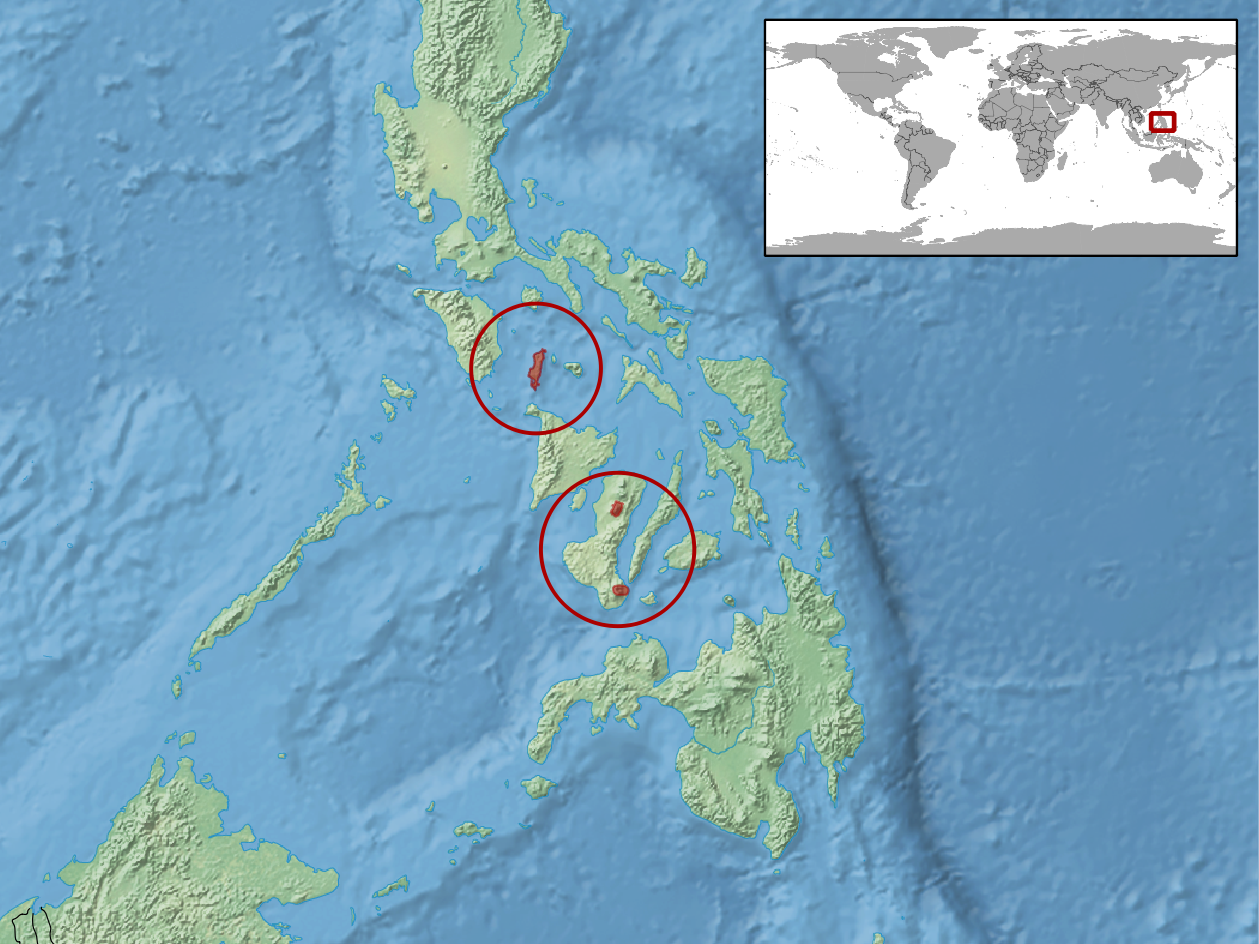

Species of lizard

The Christian scaly-toed gecko (Lepidodactylus christiani), also known commonly as Christian's scaly-toed gecko, is a species of lizard in the family Gekkonidae. The species is endemic to the Philippines.

== Etymology ==
The specific name, christiani, is in honor of United States Army Lieutenant Ralph L. Christian, who assisted Taylor in collecting specimens in the Philippines.

== Geographic range ==
L. christiani is found on the island of Negros in the Philippines.

== Habitat ==
The preferred natural habitat of L. christiani is forest, at altitudes of 250–1,200 m (820–3,940 ft).

== Reproduction ==
L. christiani is oviparous.
