= Lobulia lobulus =

Scientific classification
- Domain: Eukaryota
- Kingdom: Animalia
- Phylum: Chordata
- Class: Reptilia
- Order: Squamata
- Family: Scincidae
- Genus: Lobulia
- Species: L. lobulus

Binomial name
- Lobulia lobulus (Loveridge, 1945)

Species of lizard

The elegant lobulia (Lobulia lobulus) is a species of skink found in New Guinea.
