= Lepidodactylus euaensis =

Conservation status
- Critically Endangered (IUCN 3.1)

Scientific classification
- Kingdom: Animalia
- Phylum: Chordata
- Class: Reptilia
- Order: Squamata
- Suborder: Gekkota
- Family: Gekkonidae
- Genus: Lepidodactylus
- Species: L. euaensis

Binomial name
- Lepidodactylus euaensis Gibbons & Brown, 1988

Species of lizard

Lepidodactylus euaensis, also known as the Eua scaly-toed gecko or Eua forest gecko, is a species of gecko. It is endemic to ʻEua Island in Tonga.
