= Callulops stictogaster =

Conservation status
- Least Concern (IUCN 3.1)

Scientific classification
- Kingdom: Animalia
- Phylum: Chordata
- Class: Amphibia
- Order: Anura
- Family: Microhylidae
- Genus: Callulops
- Species: C. stictogaster

Binomial name
- Callulops stictogaster (Zweifel, 1972)

Synonyms
- Phrynomantis stictogaster Zweifel, 1972

Species of frog

Callulops stictogaster is a species of frog in the family Microhylidae. It is endemic to New Guinea and occurs in the central mountain ranges of Papua New Guinea in the Western Highlands, Eastern Highlands, Chimbu, and Morobe Provinces. The specific name stictogaster is derived from the Greek stictos (="spotted") and gaster (="belly"). Common name Irumbofoie callulops frog has been proposed for it.

== Description ==
Callulops stictogaster is a relatively large species that can reach 80 mm (3.1 in) in snout–vent length. There is a characteristic small ridge or tubercle between the eye and the nostril. The head is narrower than the body. The snout is bluntly rounded. The tympanum is visible but not prominent; the supratympanic fold is weak. The finger and the toe tips are rounded, lacking discs. The dorsal coloration varies from light purplish brown in preservative (holotype) to yellowish brown in life (a paratype). The ventral surfaces are brown with many tiny white spots.

== Habitat and conservation ==
Callulops stictogaster occurs in hill and montane rainforests at elevations of 1,400–2,580 m (4,590–8,460 ft) above sea level, often in steep terrain. It appears to be terrestrial. Development is direct (i.e, there is no free-living larval stage). It is not a common species but can nevertheless occur in large numbers in suitable habitat. It is not exposed to significant threats, although it is used as pig feed in the Chimbu Province. It is not known to occur in protected areas.
