= Callulops =

Scientific classification
- Domain: Eukaryota
- Kingdom: Animalia
- Phylum: Chordata
- Class: Amphibia
- Order: Anura
- Family: Microhylidae
- Subfamily: Asterophryinae
- Genus: Callulops; Boulenger, 1888

Type species
- Callulops doriae Boulenger, 1888

Diversity
- See text

Genus of amphibians

Callulops is a genus of microhylid frogs from Sulawesi as well as the New Guinea region, from Talaud Islands and the Maluku Islands (Moluccas) in the northwest to the Louisiade Archipelago in the east. They are medium- to large-sized terrestrial frogs inhabiting burrows on the forest floor, often under large rocks. Because their population densities can be low, and they are difficult to observe and collect owing to their lifestyle, many species are known only from few specimens.

== Species ==
Binomial Name and Author	Common Name
Callulops argus Kraus, 2019
Callulops biakensis Günther, Stelbrink, and von Rintelen, 2012
Callulops bicolor Kraus, 2019
Callulops boettgeri (Méhely, 1901)	Boettger's callulops frog
Callulops comptus (Zweifel, 1972)
Callulops doriae Boulenger, 1888	Doria's callulops frog
Callulops dubius (Boettger, 1895)	Moluccan callulops frog
Callulops eremnosphax Kraus and Allison, 2009
Callulops fojaensis Oliver, Richards, and Tjaturadi 2012
Callulops fuscus (Peters, 1867)	Brown callulops frog
Callulops glandulosus (Zweifel, 1972)	Warty callulops frog
Callulops humicola (Zweifel, 1972)	Kotuni callulops frog
Callulops kampeni (Boulenger, 1914)
Callulops kopsteini (Mertens, 1930)	Kopstein's callulops frog
Callulops marmoratus Kraus & Allison, 2003
Callulops mediodiscus (Oliver, Richards & Tjaturadi, 2012)
Callulops microtis (Werner, 1901)
Callulops neuhaussi (Vogt, 1911)
Callulops omnistriatus Kraus and Allison, 2009
Callulops personatus (Zweifel, 1972)	Maprik callulops frog
Callulops robustus (Boulenger, 1898)	Boulenger's callulops frog
Callulops sagittatus Richards, Burton, Cunningham & Dennis, 1995
Callulops stellatus Kraus, 2019
Callulops stictogaster (Zweifel, 1972)	Irumbofoie callulops frog
Callulops taxispilotus Kraus, 2019
Callulops valvifer (Barbour, 1910)
Callulops wilhelmanus (Loveridge, 1948)	Wilhelm callulops frog
Callulops wondiwoiensis Günther, Stelbrink, and von Rintelen, 2012
Callulops yapenensis Günther, Stelbrink, and von Rintelen, 2012	Wilhelm callulops frog
