= Lepidodactylus planicauda =

Conservation status
- Least Concern (IUCN 3.1)

Scientific classification
- Kingdom: Animalia
- Phylum: Chordata
- Class: Reptilia
- Order: Squamata
- Suborder: Gekkota
- Family: Gekkonidae
- Genus: Lepidodactylus
- Species: L. planicauda

Binomial name
- Lepidodactylus planicauda Stejneger, 1905
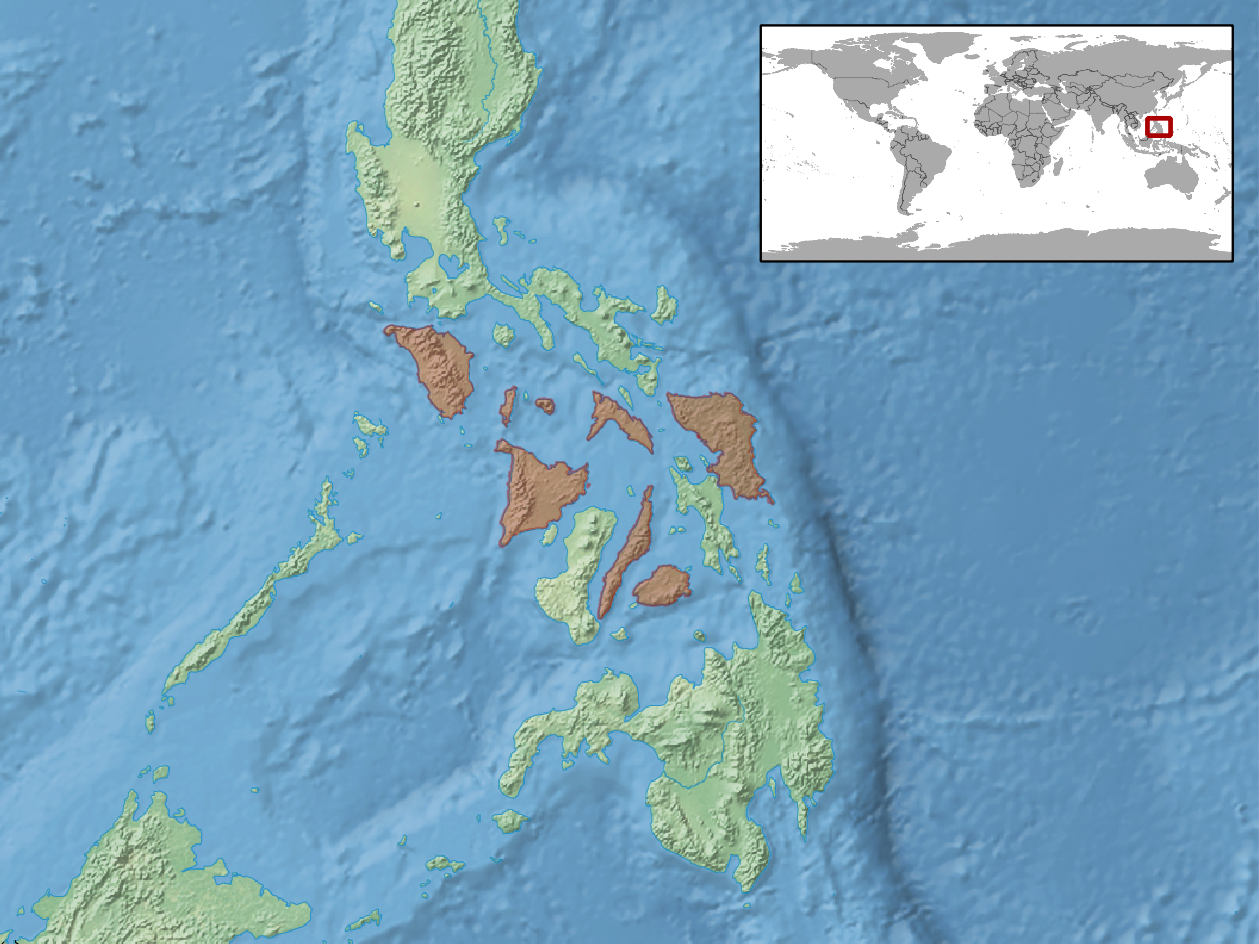

Synonyms
- Lepidodactylus naujanensis

Species of lizard

Lepidodactylus planicauda, also known as the Mindanao scaly-toed gecko or small broad-tailed smooth-scaled gecko, is a species of gecko. It is endemic to the Philippines.
