= Callulops fojaensis =

Conservation status
- Data Deficient (IUCN 3.1)

Scientific classification
- Kingdom: Animalia
- Phylum: Chordata
- Class: Amphibia
- Order: Anura
- Family: Microhylidae
- Genus: Callulops
- Species: C. fojaensis

Binomial name
- Callulops fojaensis Oliver, Richards and Tjaturadi, 2012
- Callulops fojaensis is only known from the Foja mountains, Indonesia

Species of frog

Callulops fojaensis is a species of frog in the family Microhylidae. It is only known from the Foja mountains in West Papua (Indonesia).

== Description ==
Callulops fojaensis is known from the type series consisting of two male specimens measuring 52 and 53 mm (2.0 and 2.1 in) in snout–vent length. Body is robust and pear-shaped, with wide head that is not distinct from the body. Limbs are short and robust. Iris is dark reddish brown. Tympanum is barely visible. Overall colouration is uniformly pale brown. Dorsal and lateral surfaces of head are slightly darker than dorsal and lateral surfaces of torso. Exposed surfaces of limbs are moderately pale brown, with forelimbs slightly darker than hind limbs and torso. Venter is very pale with faint brown mottling, darker on throat.

The advertisement call of male Callulops fojaensis is a series of loud, harsh barking notes aired at long intervals.

== Habitat ==
The two known individuals were located calling from burrows in the forest floor during the late afternoon in a wet, mossy mid-montane forest, at about 1,600 m (5,200 ft) asl. It appears to be a rare species as over four weeks of fieldwork did not reveal more specimens.
