= Lepidodactylus aignanus =

Conservation status
- Data Deficient (IUCN 3.1)

Scientific classification
- Kingdom: Animalia
- Phylum: Chordata
- Class: Reptilia
- Order: Squamata
- Suborder: Gekkota
- Family: Gekkonidae
- Genus: Lepidodactylus
- Species: L. aignanus

Binomial name
- Lepidodactylus aignanus Kraus, 2019

Species of lizard

Lepidodactylus aignanus is a species of gecko. It is endemic to Misima Island in the Louisiade Archipelago, Papua New Guinea.

It is a small species of Lepidodactylus, with an adult size of about 38 mm (1.5 in) in snout–vent length. The only known specimen, a female, was collected in an area of mixed gardens bordered by coastal trees. It is likely that the species is distributed throughout of the interior of the island.
