= Callulops boettgeri =

Conservation status
- Data Deficient (IUCN 3.1)

Scientific classification
- Kingdom: Animalia
- Phylum: Chordata
- Class: Amphibia
- Order: Anura
- Family: Microhylidae
- Genus: Callulops
- Species: C. boettgeri

Binomial name
- Callulops boettgeri (Méhely, 1901)
- Callulops boettgeri is only known from Halmahera, Indonesia

Synonyms
- Gnathophryne Boettgeri Méhely, 1901; Hylophorbus boettgeri — Van Kampen, 1923; Phrynomantis boettgeri — Noble, 1926; Zweifel, 1972; Asterophrys boettgeri — Parker, 1934; Callulops boettgeri — Dubois, 1988

Species of frog

Callulops boettgeri, also known as Boettger's Callulops frog, is a species of frog in the family Microhylidae. It is endemic to Halmahera in the Maluku Islands (the Moluccas) of Indonesia. It is only known from the holotype collected from Galela in 1894. The genus-level placement of this little known frog has changed many times, and it is still unclear whether it should be placed in some other genus.

== Etymology ==
The specific name boettgeri honours Oskar Boettger, a German zoologist. Boettger was the first to study the type specimen, which he identified as Phrynixalus montanus (=Cophixalus montanus).

== Description ==
The holotype (sex unspecified) measures about 38–39 mm (1.5–1.5 in) in snout–vent length. The eyes are large and protuberant. The tympanum is somewhat distinct. The fingers are long and bear relatively large discs. The toes discs are also well-developed but smaller than the finger ones. No webbing is present. The dorsal ground color is brown. There is a yellowish-white stripe running from snout to cloacal opening. Dark dorsal markings include a W-shaped mark in the scapular region and dark flecks on each side of the central light stripe. Large, rounded reddish-brown markings are present on the sides of the head and body. The ventral side is light brown, with chestnut-brown spots on the chin, throat, chest, and undersides of limbs.

== Habitat and conservation ==
The holotype was found under moss at the foot of a tree at an elevation of about 650 m (2,130 ft) above sea level. This species presumably lives in rainforest and breeds by direct development, (i.e., there is no free-living larval stage), as other Callulops (and asterophryinids in general).

Threats to this species are unknown. The type locality is not within a protected area.
