= Lobulia marmorata =

Scientific classification
- Kingdom: Animalia
- Phylum: Chordata
- Class: Reptilia
- Order: Squamata
- Family: Scincidae
- Genus: Lobulia
- Species: L. marmorata

Binomial name
- Lobulia marmorata (Slavenko, Tamar, Tallowin, Kraus, Allison, Carranza, & Meiri, 2021)

Species of lizard

Lobulia marmorata, or the marbled moss skink, is a species of skink found in Papua New Guinea.
