= Callulops glandulosus =

Conservation status
- Data Deficient (IUCN 3.1)

Scientific classification
- Kingdom: Animalia
- Phylum: Chordata
- Class: Amphibia
- Order: Anura
- Family: Microhylidae
- Genus: Callulops
- Species: C. glandulosus

Binomial name
- Callulops glandulosus (Zweifel, 1972)

Species of frog

Callulops glandulosus is a species of frog in the family Microhylidae. It is endemic to Papua New Guinea. Its natural habitat is subtropical or tropical moist montane forests. It is threatened by habitat loss.
