= Lobulia vogelkopensis =

Scientific classification
- Kingdom: Animalia
- Phylum: Chordata
- Class: Reptilia
- Order: Squamata
- Family: Scincidae
- Genus: Lobulia
- Species: L. vogelkopensis

Binomial name
- Lobulia vogelkopensis Slavenko, Tamar, Tallowin, Kraus, Allison, Carranza, & Meiri, 2021

Species of lizard

Lobulia vogelkopensis, or the Vogelkop moss skink, is a species of skink found in Western New Guinea, Indonesia.
