= Slender chained gecko =

Scientific classification
- Domain: Eukaryota
- Kingdom: Animalia
- Phylum: Chordata
- Class: Reptilia
- Order: Squamata
- Infraorder: Gekkota
- Family: Gekkonidae
- Genus: Lepidodactylus
- Species: L. pumilus

Binomial name
- Lepidodactylus pumilus (Boulenger, 1885)

Synonyms
- Gecko pumilus

Species of lizard

The slender chained gecko (Lepidodactylus pumilus) is a species of gecko. It is found in Queensland and Cape York Peninsula in Australia, the Torres Strait Islands, and Papua New Guinea.
