= Emoia beryllion =

Scientific classification
- Kingdom: Animalia
- Phylum: Chordata
- Class: Reptilia
- Order: Squamata
- Family: Scincidae
- Genus: Emoia
- Species: E. beryllion

Binomial name
- Emoia beryllion Kraus, 2018

Species of lizard

Emoia beryllion is a species of lizard in the family Scincidae. It is found on Rossel Island in Papua New Guinea.
