= Lepidodactylus pulcher =

Conservation status
- Data Deficient (IUCN 3.1)

Scientific classification
- Kingdom: Animalia
- Phylum: Chordata
- Class: Reptilia
- Order: Squamata
- Suborder: Gekkota
- Family: Gekkonidae
- Genus: Lepidodactylus
- Species: L. pulcher

Binomial name
- Lepidodactylus pulcher Boulenger, 1885

Species of lizard

Lepidodactylus pulcher, also known as the Wild scaly-toed gecko or Admiralty gecko, is a species of gecko. It is endemic to the Admiralty Islands (Papua New Guinea).
