= Lepidodactylus intermedius =

Scientific classification
- Kingdom: Animalia
- Phylum: Chordata
- Class: Reptilia
- Order: Squamata
- Suborder: Gekkota
- Family: Gekkonidae
- Genus: Lepidodactylus
- Species: L. intermedius

Binomial name
- Lepidodactylus intermedius Darevsky, 1964

Synonyms
- Lepidodactylus lugubris intermedius

Species of lizard

Lepidodactylus intermedius is a species of gecko. It is found on Komodo and Rintja islands in the Lesser Sunda Islands of Indonesia.
