= Callulops personatus =

Conservation status
- Least Concern (IUCN 3.1)

Scientific classification
- Kingdom: Animalia
- Phylum: Chordata
- Class: Amphibia
- Order: Anura
- Family: Microhylidae
- Genus: Callulops
- Species: C. personatus

Binomial name
- Callulops personatus (Zweifel, 1972)

Synonyms
- Phrynomantis personata Zweifel, 1972

Species of frog

Callulops personatus is a species of frog in the family Microhylidae. It is endemic to the northern lowlands of central New Guinea and occurs in both Western New Guinea (Indonesia) and Papua New Guinea. The specific name personatus is Latin adjective meaning "masked", in reference to the head coloration. Common name Maprik callulops frog has been proposed for it.

== Description ==
Callulops personatus is a relatively large species, with males reaching a snout–vent length of 73 mm (2.9 in) and females 71 mm (2.8 in). The head is narrower than the relatively robust body. The snout is truncate. The tympanum is indistinct; the supratympanic fold runs over and behind the tympanum. The finger and the toe tips have grooved terminal discs; no webbing is present. The anterior half of the head is black, contrasting with the reddish brown coloration of the rest of the dorsal surfaces; there are some black dorsal markings that greatly vary in their intensity between individuals. The belly is immaculate white with an orange or gray tint.

== Habitat and conservation ==
Callulops personatus occurs in lowland rainforest, secondary forest, and anthropogenic grassland at elevations of 240–1,000 m (790–3,280 ft) above sea level, perhaps lower. The holotype was collected from the mouth of one-foot deep burrow and was spotted based on its call. Presumably, development is direct (i.e., there is no free-living larval stage). It is a fairly common species that is not experiencing significant threats. Its range includes the Cyclops Nature Reserve.
