= Callulops comptus =

Conservation status
- Least Concern (IUCN 3.1)

Scientific classification
- Kingdom: Animalia
- Phylum: Chordata
- Class: Amphibia
- Order: Anura
- Family: Microhylidae
- Genus: Callulops
- Species: C. comptus

Binomial name
- Callulops comptus (Zweifel, 1972)

Species of frog

Callulops comptus is a species of frog in the family Microhylidae. It is endemic to Papua New Guinea. Its natural habitats are subtropical or tropical moist montane forests and heavily degraded former forest.
