= Callulops wilhelmanus =

Conservation status
- Least Concern (IUCN 3.1)

Scientific classification
- Kingdom: Animalia
- Phylum: Chordata
- Class: Amphibia
- Order: Anura
- Family: Microhylidae
- Genus: Callulops
- Species: C. wilhelmanus

Binomial name
- Callulops wilhelmanus (Loveridge, 1948)

Synonyms
- Asterophrys pansa wilhelmana Loveridge, 1948; Asterophrys wilhelmana (Loveridge, 1948); Phrynomantis wilhelmana (Loveridge, 1948)

Species of frog

Callulops wilhelmanus is a species of frog in the family Microhylidae. It is endemic to the central mountain ranges of Papua New Guinea. Its natural habitats are dense, primary montane rainforest at elevations of 2,230–3,400 m (7,320–11,150 ft) above sea level. It lives on the forest floor. It can also adapt to live in degraded habitats, including rural gardens. It can be locally abundant although it does not typically occur at high densities.
