= Callulops marmoratus =

Conservation status
- Data Deficient (IUCN 3.1)

Scientific classification
- Kingdom: Animalia
- Phylum: Chordata
- Class: Amphibia
- Order: Anura
- Family: Microhylidae
- Genus: Callulops
- Species: C. marmoratus

Binomial name
- Callulops marmoratus Kraus and Allison, 2003

Species of frog

Callulops marmoratus is a species of frog in the family Microhylidae. It is endemic to Papua New Guinea and only known from its type locality, Crater Mountain Wildlife Management Area in the southwestern Chimbu Province, on the southern escarpment of the New Guinea Highlands.

== Description ==
The type series includes one adult male measuring 53 mm (2.1 in) and two adult females measuring 51 and 52 mm (2.0 and 2.0 in) in snout–vent length. Four juveniles ranged 21–40 mm (0.83–1.57 in) in SVL. The head is relatively wide and the snout is short. The canthus rostralis is rounded. The tympanum is indistinct. Both fingers and toes are unwebbed but have moderately enlarged disks. Skin is smooth. The dorsum shows an irregular pattern of dark brown mottling, to which the specific name marmoratus (=Latin for "mottled") refers to. The pattern is more diffuse in the juveniles.

Callulops marmoratus is only known from the Crater Mountain Wildlife Management Area, Papua New Guinea

== Habitat and conservation ==
The type series was collected from an evergreen/submontane hill forest at 850–900 m (2,790–2,950 ft) above sea level. One of adults was found underground while digging, whereas the other two adults were found in a ditch. Two juveniles were at entrances to small burrows. Thus, the species appears to be terrestrial or fossorial, in agreement with its morphology.

There are no known threats to this species. The Crater Mountain Wildlife Management Area is a protected area.
