= Callulops doriae =

Conservation status
- Least Concern (IUCN 3.1)

Scientific classification
- Kingdom: Animalia
- Phylum: Chordata
- Class: Amphibia
- Order: Anura
- Family: Microhylidae
- Genus: Callulops
- Species: C. doriae

Binomial name
- Callulops doriae Boulenger, 1888

Synonyms
- Manthophryne neuhaussi Vogt, 1911; Hylophorbus neuhaussi (Vogt, 1911); Phrynomantis neuhaussi (Vogt, 1911); Asterophrys doriae (Boulenger, 1888); Xenorhina doriae (Boulenger, 1888); Phrynomantis doriae (Boulenger, 1888)

Species of frog

Callulops doriae is a species of frog in the family Microhylidae. It is endemic to Papua New Guinea and occurs in the eastern mainland Papua New Guinea and in Tagula Island, Louisiade Archipelago. It is the type species of the genus Callulops erected by George Albert Boulenger in 1888. Common name Doria's callulops frog has been coined for this species.

== Etymology ==
The specific name doriae honours Giacomo Doria, an Italian zoologist.

== Description ==
Callulops doriae are relatively large frogs that can reach 100 mm (3.9 in) in snout–vent length. The dorsal surfaces are verrucous, light brown, and have numerous blackish spots, each bearing a central white cap.

== Habitat and conservation ==
This species lives on the forest floor in rainforests at elevations up to 1,520 m (4,990 ft) above sea level. Males call from low trees and rock crevices. Development is probably direct, without a free-living larval stage.

Callulops doriae is a widespread but uncommon species. No major threats to it have been identified. It occurs in a few protected areas.
