= HMS Lark (1880) =

1880 schooner

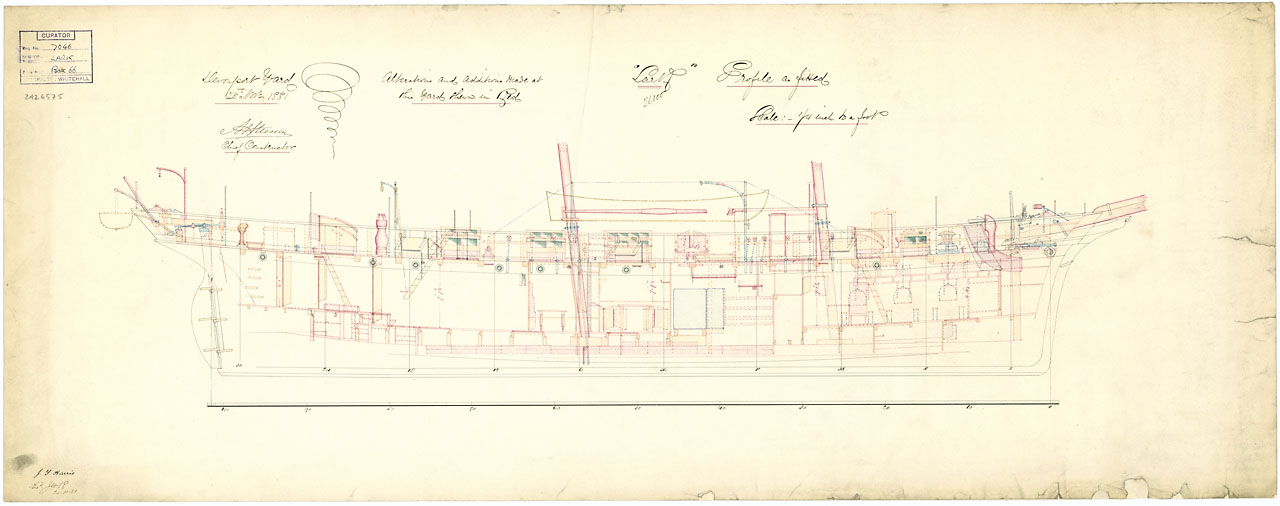
- Drawing of the inboard profile plan of the Lark, 1881

History

United Kingdom
- Name: HMS Lark
- Builder: Westacott’s, Barnstaple
- Launched: 4 December 1880
- Fate: Sold December 1887.

General characteristics
- Type: schooner

HMS Lark was a schooner of the Royal Navy, built by Westacott's, Barnstaple and launched on 4 December 1880.

Commenced service on the Australia Station in 1882. She undertook survey work in the Bougainville Strait, Choisel Bay and San Cristobel Island. During her life the ship's surgeon on board was Henry B. Guppy who also did much scientific research during the journeys.

In 1883 Lark under C. F. Oldham transported the crew of the barque Illie which was wrecked in the Solomon Islands to Brisbane. She sold at Sydney in December 1887.

Based in Hobart, she was sold again in 1888 and was used as a coastal commercial trader in the Solomon Islands based out of Sydney.
