= Lepidodactylus buleli =

Conservation status
- Data Deficient (IUCN 3.1)

Scientific classification
- Kingdom: Animalia
- Phylum: Chordata
- Class: Reptilia
- Order: Squamata
- Suborder: Gekkota
- Family: Gekkonidae
- Genus: Lepidodactylus
- Species: L. buleli

Binomial name
- Lepidodactylus buleli Ineich, 2006

Species of lizard

Lepidodactylus buleli is a species of gecko, a lizard in the family Gekkonidae. The species is endemic to Espiritu Santo, an island in the Vanuatu Archipelago.

== Discovery ==
Researchers from France's National Museum of Natural History, recovered nine eggs during an expedition to the region in 2006. One of the eggs yielded a live hatchling which was determined to be of a previously unknown species.

== Etymology ==
The specific name, buleli, refers to a "personal and private story" of the binomial authority.

== Habitat ==
The preferred natural habitat of L. buleli is forest, at altitudes above 630 m (2,070 ft).

== Reproduction ==
L. buleli is oviparous.
