= Mortlock Islands scaly-toed gecko =

Conservation status
- Critically Endangered (IUCN 3.1)

Scientific classification
- Kingdom: Animalia
- Phylum: Chordata
- Class: Reptilia
- Order: Squamata
- Suborder: Gekkota
- Family: Gekkonidae
- Genus: Lepidodactylus
- Species: L. oligoporus

Binomial name
- Lepidodactylus oligoporus Buden, 2007

Species of lizard

The Mortlock Islands scaly-toed gecko (Lepidodactylus oligoporus) is a species of gecko. It is endemic to Toimon Island in the Federated States of Micronesia.
