= New Guinea scaly-toed gecko =

Conservation status
- Least Concern (IUCN 3.1)

Scientific classification
- Kingdom: Animalia
- Phylum: Chordata
- Class: Reptilia
- Order: Squamata
- Suborder: Gekkota
- Family: Gekkonidae
- Genus: Lepidodactylus
- Species: L. novaeguineae

Binomial name
- Lepidodactylus novaeguineae Brown & Parker, 1977

Species of lizard

The New Guinea scaly-toed gecko (Lepidodactylus novaeguineae) is a species of gecko. It is endemic to New Guinea.
