= Lepidodactylus herrei =

Conservation status
- Least Concern (IUCN 3.1)

Scientific classification
- Kingdom: Animalia
- Phylum: Chordata
- Class: Reptilia
- Order: Squamata
- Suborder: Gekkota
- Family: Gekkonidae
- Genus: Lepidodactylus
- Species: L. herrei

Binomial name
- Lepidodactylus herrei Taylor, 1923
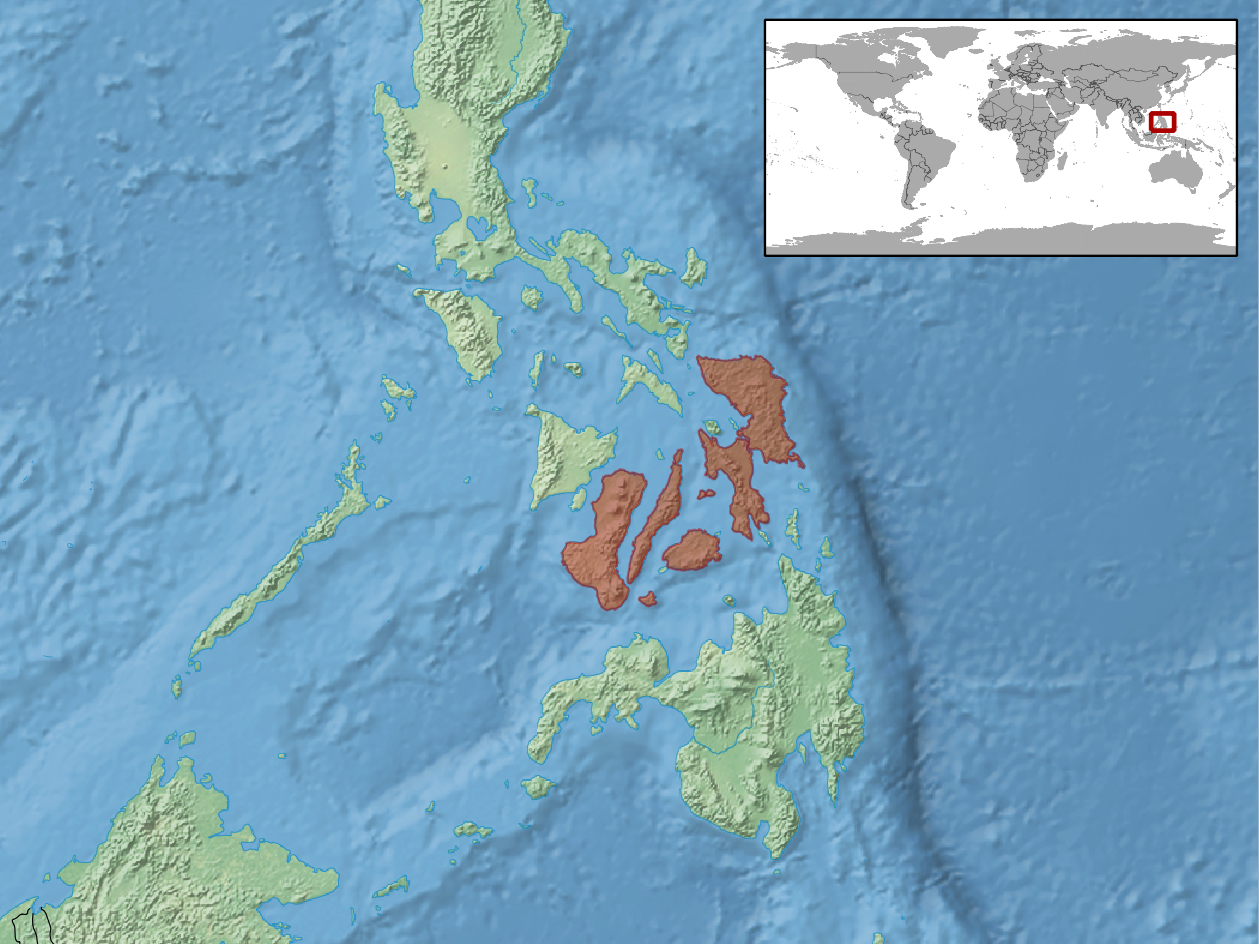

Species of lizard

Lepidodactylus herrei, known commonly as the Negros scaly-toed gecko or the white-lined smooth-scaled gecko, is a species of gecko, a lizard in the family Gekkonidae. The species is endemic to the Philippines.

== Etymology ==
The specific name, herrei, is in honor of American ichthyologist Albert William Herre.

== Geographic range ==
In the Philippines L. herrei is found on the islands of Cebu and Negros.

== Habitat ==
The preferred natural habitats of L. herrei are savanna, forest, and freshwater wetlands, but it has also been found in modified habitats such as coconut groves and urban areas.

== Reproduction ==
L. herrei is oviparous.

== Subspecies ==
Including the nominotypical subspecies, there are two subspecies which are recognized as being valid.

- Lepidodactylus herrei herrei Taylor, 1923
- Lepidodactylus herrei medianus W.C. Brown & Alcala, 1978
