= Callulops humicola =

Conservation status
- Least Concern (IUCN 3.1)

Scientific classification
- Kingdom: Animalia
- Phylum: Chordata
- Class: Amphibia
- Order: Anura
- Family: Microhylidae
- Genus: Callulops
- Species: C. humicola

Binomial name
- Callulops humicola (Zweifel, 1972)

Species of frog

Callulops humicola is a species of frog in the family Microhylidae. It is endemic to Papua New Guinea. Its natural habitats are subtropical or tropical moist montane forests and heavily degraded former forest. It is threatened by habitat loss.
