= Ornithuroscincus sabini =

Scientific classification
- Kingdom: Animalia
- Phylum: Chordata
- Class: Reptilia
- Order: Squamata
- Family: Scincidae
- Genus: Ornithuroscincus
- Species: O. sabini

Binomial name
- Ornithuroscincus sabini (Kraus, 2020)

Synonyms
- Lobulia sabini Kraus, 2020

Species of lizard

Ornithuroscincus sabini is a species of skink. It is endemic to Milne Bay Province, eastern Papua New Guinea. It is terrestrial to semi-arboreal and has been recorded at elevations of 1,200–2,740 m (3,940–8,990 ft) above sea level.

Ornithuroscincus sabini measure 29–69 mm (1.1–2.7 in) in snout–vent length. The limbs are short.
