= Ornithuroscincus albodorsalis =

Conservation status
- Data Deficient (IUCN 3.1)

Scientific classification
- Kingdom: Animalia
- Phylum: Chordata
- Class: Reptilia
- Order: Squamata
- Suborder: Scinciformata
- Infraorder: Scincomorpha
- Family: Scincidae
- Genus: Ornithuroscincus
- Species: O. albodorsalis

Binomial name
- Ornithuroscincus albodorsalis (Vogt, 1932)

Species of lizard

Ornithuroscincus albodorsalis is a species of skink found in Papua New Guinea.
