= Cyrtodactylus epiroticus =

Conservation status
- Least Concern (IUCN 3.1)

Scientific classification
- Kingdom: Animalia
- Phylum: Chordata
- Class: Reptilia
- Order: Squamata
- Suborder: Gekkota
- Family: Gekkonidae
- Genus: Cyrtodactylus
- Species: C. epiroticus

Binomial name
- Cyrtodactylus epiroticus Kraus, 2008

Species of lizard

Cyrtodactylus epiroticus is a species of gecko that is endemic to Papua New Guinea.
