= Cyrtodactylus serratus =

Conservation status
- Least Concern (IUCN 3.1)

Scientific classification
- Kingdom: Animalia
- Phylum: Chordata
- Class: Reptilia
- Order: Squamata
- Suborder: Gekkota
- Family: Gekkonidae
- Genus: Cyrtodactylus
- Species: C. serratus

Binomial name
- Cyrtodactylus serratus Kraus, 2007

Species of lizard

Cyrtodactylus serratus is a species of gecko that is endemic to Papua New Guinea, specifically the south-west part of the country. It is a rather common species, living mostly in the canopy of forests. It is found in elevations of 100 meters to 1,400 meters.
