= Lepidodactylus bisakol =

Scientific classification
- Kingdom: Animalia
- Phylum: Chordata
- Class: Reptilia
- Order: Squamata
- Suborder: Gekkota
- Family: Gekkonidae
- Genus: Lepidodactylus
- Species: L. bisakol

Binomial name
- Lepidodactylus bisakol Eliades, Brown, Huang, & Siler, 2021

Species of lizard

Lepidodactylus bisakol, or the Bicol scaly-toed gecko, is a species of gecko. It is endemic to the Bicol Peninsula in Luzon, the Philippines.

Lepidodactylus bisakol measure 35–39 mm (1.4–1.5 in) in snout–vent length.
