= Cyrtodactylus atremus =

Scientific classification
- Kingdom: Animalia
- Phylum: Chordata
- Class: Reptilia
- Order: Squamata
- Suborder: Gekkota
- Family: Gekkonidae
- Genus: Cyrtodactylus
- Species: C. atremus

Binomial name
- Cyrtodactylus atremus Kraus & Weijola, 2019

Species of lizard

Cyrtodactylus atremus is a species of gecko endemic to Papua New Guinea.
