= Ornithuroscincus bengaun =

Scientific classification
- Kingdom: Animalia
- Phylum: Chordata
- Class: Reptilia
- Order: Squamata
- Family: Scincidae
- Genus: Ornithuroscincus
- Species: O. bengaun

Binomial name
- Ornithuroscincus bengaun Slavenko, Tamar, Tallowin, Kraus, Allison, Carranza, & Meiri, 2021

Species of lizard

Ornithuroscincus bengaun is a species of skink endemic to Milne Bay Province, Papua New Guinea. It is only known from its type locality in the Owen Stanley Range.

The holotype, an adult male, measures 48 mm (1.9 in) in snout–vent length. No other specimens are known.
