= Callulops omnistriatus =

Scientific classification
- Kingdom: Animalia
- Phylum: Chordata
- Class: Amphibia
- Order: Anura
- Family: Microhylidae
- Genus: Callulops
- Species: C. omnistriatus

Binomial name
- Callulops omnistriatus Kraus and Allison, 2009
- All known populations of Callulops omnistriatus are in the Southern Highlands Province, Papua New Guinea

Species of frog

Callulops omnistriatus is a species of frog in the family Microhylidae. It is endemic to Papua New Guinea and is known from the southern slope of the Central Highlands, Southern Highlands Province. The type locality is in the vicinity of the Moro Airport.

== Description ==
Adult males measure 55–60 mm (2.2–2.4 in) and adult females 50–67 mm (2.0–2.6 in) in snout–vent length. The snout is broad and truncate in dorsal view. The eyes are moderately large. The tympanum is distinct and rather large. The fingers and the toes have moderately expanded discs; there are well-developed terminal grooves, to which the specific name omnistriatus alludes (from Latin omnis meaning "all" and striatu meaning "grooved"). No webbing is present. The dorsum is uniformly brown, with a hint of violet. The face is darker. There are traces of lumbar ocelli, and a specimen had vague and faint yellow-brown dorsal mottling. The venter is lavender, getting darker towards the chin and throat and gradually from thighs to feet.

== Habitat and conservation ==
The type series was collected from 930–960 m (3,050–3,150 ft) above sea level. The species description contains no information on the habitat. As of late 2020, this species has not been assessed for the IUCN Red List of Threatened Species.
