= Cyrtodactylus klugei =

Conservation status
- Least Concern (IUCN 3.1)

Scientific classification
- Kingdom: Animalia
- Phylum: Chordata
- Class: Reptilia
- Order: Squamata
- Suborder: Gekkota
- Family: Gekkonidae
- Genus: Cyrtodactylus
- Species: C. klugei

Binomial name
- Cyrtodactylus klugei Kraus, 2008

Species of lizard

Cyrtodactylus klugei is a species of gecko, a lizard in the family Gekkonidae. The species is endemic to Papua New Guinea.

== Etymology ==
The specific name, klugei, is in honor of American herpetologist Arnold G. Kluge.

== Geographic range ==
Within Papua New Guinea, C. klugei is found only on Tagula Island (also known as Sudest Island and Vanatinai Island), Milne Bay Province.

== Habitat ==
The preferred natural habitat of C. klugei is forest, at altitudes of 0–350 m (0–1,148 ft).

== Description ==
A large species for its genus, adults of C. klugei may attain a snout-to-vent length (SVL) of 13.0–14.3 cm (5.1–5.6 in).

== Reproduction ==
C. klugei is oviparous.
