= Callulops eremnosphax =

Scientific classification
- Kingdom: Animalia
- Phylum: Chordata
- Class: Amphibia
- Order: Anura
- Family: Microhylidae
- Genus: Callulops
- Species: C. eremnosphax

Binomial name
- Callulops eremnosphax Kraus and Allison, 2009

Species of frog

Callulops eremnosphax is a species of frog in the family Microhylidae. It is endemic to Papua New Guinea and only known from its type locality near Tekadu Airport in the Gulf Province. The specific name eremnosphax is derived from Greek eremnos meaning "dark" and sphax meaning "throat".

== Description ==
Based on the type series consisting of two adult males and a female, males measure about 34–36 mm (1.3–1.4 in) and females about 43 mm (1.7 in) in snout–vent length. The snout is rounded. The eyes are moderately large. The tympanum is indistinct and rather small. The fingers have small discs, those of the toes are slightly larger. No webbing is present. The head and dorsum are uniform dark chocolate brown. The upper flanks are noticeably lighter brown, and the coloration gradually turns to light gray-brown towards the venter. The chin and the throat are dark brown. The rest of the venter is light gray-brown, albeit possibly with brown stippling reducing the contrast with the darker anterior parts. The iris is dark brown.

The male advertisement call consists of 6–10 barking notes.

== Habitat and conservation ==
The type series was collected from the floor of alluvial wet forest at 120 m (390 ft) above sea level. Males call from elevated sites at the base of trees. As of late 2020, this species has not been assessed for the IUCN Red List of Threatened Species.

Callulops eremnosphax is only known from its type locality in the Gulf Province, Papua New Guinea
