= Lobulia brongersmai =

Conservation status
- Least Concern (IUCN 3.1)

Scientific classification
- Kingdom: Animalia
- Phylum: Chordata
- Class: Reptilia
- Order: Squamata
- Family: Scincidae
- Genus: Lobulia
- Species: L. brongersmai

Binomial name
- Lobulia brongersmai (Zweifel, 1972)

Synonyms
- Leiolopisma brongersmai Zweifel, 1972; Lobulia brongersmai — Greer, 1974

Species of lizard

Lobulia brongersmai, also known as the Brongersma's lobulia, is a species of skink, a lizard in the family Scincidae. The species is endemic to the island of New Guinea.

== Habitat ==
The preferred natural habitat of L. brongersmai is forest, at altitudes of 1,000–1,500 m (3,300–4,900 ft).

== Etymology ==
The specific name, brongersmai, is in honor of Dutch herpetologist Leo Brongersma.

== Description ==
L. brongersmai may attain a snout-to-vent length (SVL) of 5.9 cm (2.3 in).

== Reproduction ==
The mode of reproduction of L. brongersmai is unknown.
