= Lepidodactylus lombocensis =

Scientific classification
- Kingdom: Animalia
- Phylum: Chordata
- Class: Reptilia
- Order: Squamata
- Suborder: Gekkota
- Family: Gekkonidae
- Genus: Lepidodactylus
- Species: L. lombocensis

Binomial name
- Lepidodactylus lombocensis Mertens, 1929

Species of lizard

Lepidodactylus lombocensis is a species of gecko. It is found on Lombok in the Lesser Sunda Islands.
