= Lepidodactylus nakahiwalay =

Scientific classification
- Kingdom: Animalia
- Phylum: Chordata
- Class: Reptilia
- Order: Squamata
- Suborder: Gekkota
- Family: Gekkonidae
- Genus: Lepidodactylus
- Species: L. nakahiwalay

Binomial name
- Lepidodactylus nakahiwalay Eliades, Brown, Huang, & Siler, 2021

Species of lizard

The Lubang scaly-toed gecko (Lepidodactylus nakahiwalay) is a species lizard in the Gekkonidae family endemic to Lubang, Philippines.
