= Lepidodactylus guppyi =

Conservation status
- Least Concern (IUCN 3.1)

Scientific classification
- Kingdom: Animalia
- Phylum: Chordata
- Class: Reptilia
- Order: Squamata
- Suborder: Gekkota
- Family: Gekkonidae
- Genus: Lepidodactylus
- Species: L. guppyi

Binomial name
- Lepidodactylus guppyi Boulenger, 1884

Species of lizard

Lepidodactylus guppyi, also known commonly as Guppy's gecko and the Solomons scaly-toed gecko, is a species of lizard in the family Gekkonidae. The species is endemic to islands in the southwestern Pacific Ocean.

== Etymology ==
The specific name, guppyi, is in honor of British botanist Henry Brougham Guppy.

== Geographic range ==
L. guppyi is found in the Bismarck Archipelago, the Solomon Islands, and Vanuatu.

== Habitat ==
The preferred natural habitat of L. guppyi is forest, at altitudes from sea level to 500 m (1,600 ft).

== Reproduction ==
L. guppyi is oviparous.
