= Mountain scaly-toed gecko =

Conservation status
- Least Concern (IUCN 3.1)

Scientific classification
- Kingdom: Animalia
- Phylum: Chordata
- Class: Reptilia
- Order: Squamata
- Suborder: Gekkota
- Family: Gekkonidae
- Genus: Lepidodactylus
- Species: L. magnus

Binomial name
- Lepidodactylus magnus Brown & Parker, 1977

Species of lizard

The mountain scaly-toed gecko (Lepidodactylus magnus) is a species of gecko. It is endemic to Papua New Guinea.
