= Cyrtodactylus robustus =

Conservation status
- Least Concern (IUCN 3.1)

Scientific classification
- Kingdom: Animalia
- Phylum: Chordata
- Class: Reptilia
- Order: Squamata
- Suborder: Gekkota
- Family: Gekkonidae
- Genus: Cyrtodactylus
- Species: C. robustus

Binomial name
- Cyrtodactylus robustus Kraus, 2008

Species of lizard

Cyrtodactylus robustus is a species of gecko that is endemic to Rossel Island in Papua New Guinea.
