= Lepidodactylus babuyanensis =

Scientific classification
- Kingdom: Animalia
- Phylum: Chordata
- Class: Reptilia
- Order: Squamata
- Suborder: Gekkota
- Family: Gekkonidae
- Genus: Lepidodactylus
- Species: L. babuyanensis

Binomial name
- Lepidodactylus babuyanensis Eliades, Brown, Huang, & Siler, 2021

Species of lizard

Lepidodactylus babuyanensis is a species of gecko. It is endemic to the Philippines.
