= Lepidodactylus aureolineatus =

Conservation status
- Least Concern (IUCN 3.1)

Scientific classification
- Kingdom: Animalia
- Phylum: Chordata
- Class: Reptilia
- Order: Squamata
- Suborder: Gekkota
- Family: Gekkonidae
- Genus: Lepidodactylus
- Species: L. aureolineatus

Binomial name
- Lepidodactylus aureolineatus Taylor, 1915
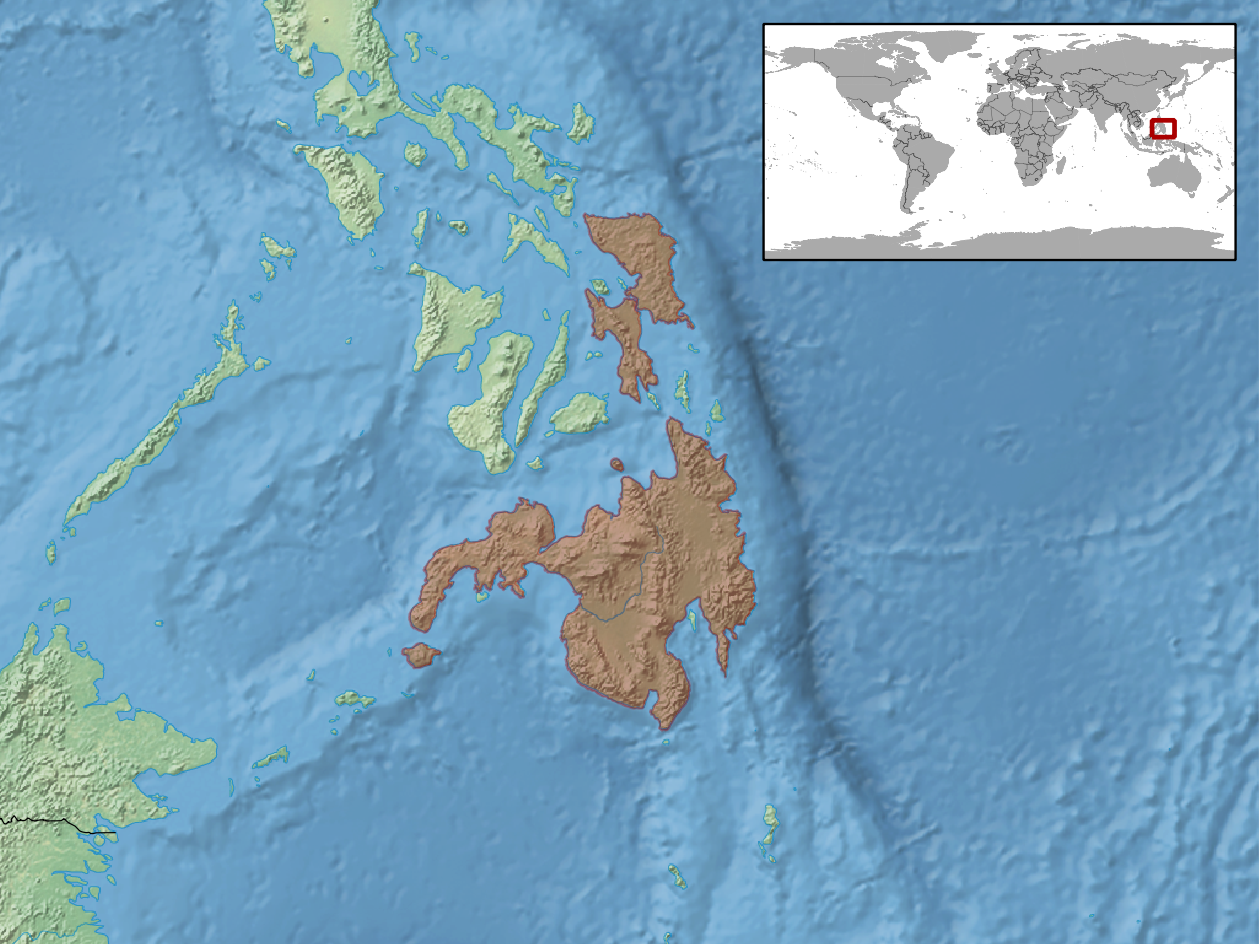

Species of lizard

Lepidodactylus aureolineatus, also known as the golden scaly-toed gecko or yellow-lined smooth-scaled gecko, is a species of gecko. It is endemic to the Philippines.
