= Ornithuroscincus pterophilus =

Scientific classification
- Kingdom: Animalia
- Phylum: Chordata
- Class: Reptilia
- Order: Squamata
- Family: Scincidae
- Genus: Ornithuroscincus
- Species: O. pterophilus

Binomial name
- Ornithuroscincus pterophilus Slavenko, Tamar, Tallowin, Kraus, Allison, Carranza, & Meiri, 2021

Species of lizard

Ornithuroscincus pterophilus is a species of skink found in Papua New Guinea.
