= Ornithuroscincus viridis =

Scientific classification
- Kingdom: Animalia
- Phylum: Chordata
- Class: Reptilia
- Order: Squamata
- Family: Scincidae
- Genus: Ornithuroscincus
- Species: O. viridis

Binomial name
- Ornithuroscincus viridis Slavenko, Tamar, Tallowin, Kraus, Allison, Carranza, & Meiri, 2021

Species of lizard

Ornithuroscincus viridis is a species of skink. It is endemic to the Owen Stanley Range in the Central Province, southeastern Papua New Guinea. Common name green smooth-eared skink has been coined for it.

The type series was collected from underneath logs at the edge of a partially swampy grassland, bordered by upper montane forest, at 2,052–2,076 m (6,732–6,811 ft) above sea level.

Adults measure 42–55 mm (1.7–2.2 in) in snout–vent length. They have short limbs.
