= Lepidodactylus labialis =

Conservation status
- Data Deficient (IUCN 3.1)

Scientific classification
- Kingdom: Animalia
- Phylum: Chordata
- Class: Reptilia
- Order: Squamata
- Suborder: Gekkota
- Family: Gekkonidae
- Genus: Lepidodactylus
- Species: L. labialis

Binomial name
- Lepidodactylus labialis (Peters, 1867)
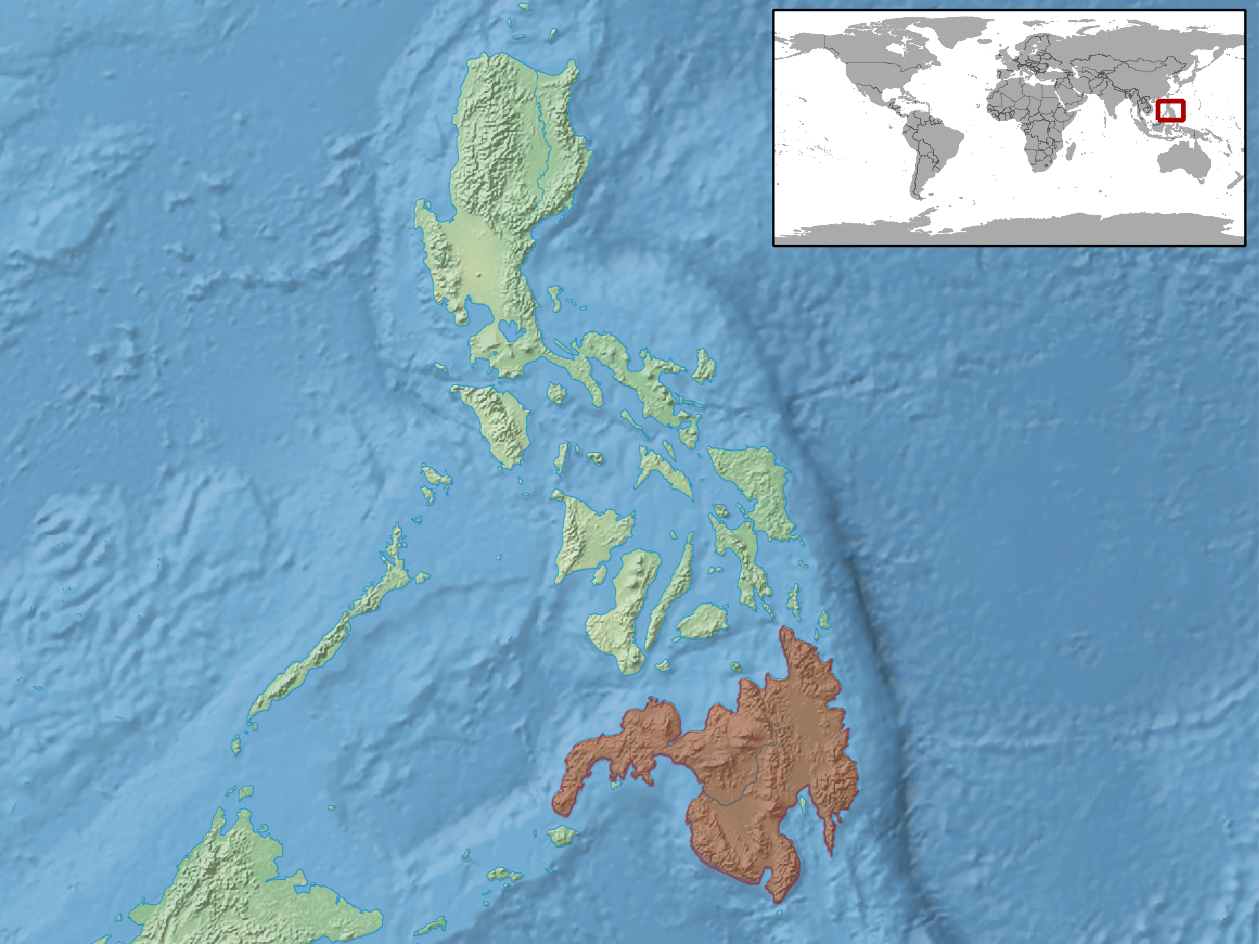

Synonyms
- Gecko labialis; Pseudogekko labialis

Species of lizard

Lepidodactylus labialis, also known as the Mindanao false gecko or dark-spotted smooth-scaled gecko, is a species of gecko. It is endemic to the Philippines. It is sometimes placed in the genus Pseudogekko.
