= Lepidodactylus flaviocularis =

Conservation status
- Critically Endangered (IUCN 3.1)

Scientific classification
- Kingdom: Animalia
- Phylum: Chordata
- Class: Reptilia
- Order: Squamata
- Suborder: Gekkota
- Family: Gekkonidae
- Genus: Lepidodactylus
- Species: L. flaviocularis

Binomial name
- Lepidodactylus flaviocularis Brown, McCoy, & Rodda, 1992

Species of lizard

Lepidodactylus flaviocularis, also known as the yellow-eyed scaly-toed gecko or yellow-eyed gecko, is a species of gecko. It is endemic to Guadalcanal in the Solomon Islands.
