= Callulops mediodiscus =

Scientific classification
- Kingdom: Animalia
- Phylum: Chordata
- Class: Amphibia
- Order: Anura
- Family: Microhylidae
- Genus: Callulops
- Species: C. mediodiscus

Binomial name
- Callulops mediodiscus Oliver, Richards & Tjaturadi, 2012

Species of frog

Callulops mediodiscus is a species of frog in the family Microhylidae. It is only known from the type locality in the upper Kikori Basin in the Southern Highlands Province, Papua New Guinea. The specific name refers to its most distinctive feature, the moderately enlarged discs on fingers and toes, although their function remains unknown as the specimens were collected on or near the ground.

== Description ==
Callulops mediodiscus is only known from the all-male type series. Specimens measure 42–49 mm (1.7–1.9 in) in snout–vent length. Body is moderately slender and somewhat pear-shaped, with wide head that is not distinct from the body. Limbs are long and moderately robust, and fingers and toes bear moderately enlarged discs. Overall colouration is light yellowish-brown, with noticeably darker head. Lateral surfaces are more strongly yellow-tinged than dorsum. Exposed surfaces of forelimbs are yellowish-brown proximally and becoming medium brown distally. Exposed surfaces of hindlimbs are relatively uniform yellowish brown, but digits are lighter, tending towards off-white. Iris is silvery-grey.

The advertisement call of male Callulops mediodiscus is a series of four loud, barking notes, with a dominant frequency of 1529–1661 Hz.

== Habitat ==
The type locality is extremely wet, mossy lower-montane rainforest at about 1,750 m (5,740 ft) asl on karst limestone. Individuals were found on the ground on leaf litter, or calling on mossy rocks and logs after rain at night. No other Callulops species were found at the locality.
