= Callulops fuscus =

Conservation status
- Data Deficient (IUCN 3.1)

Scientific classification
- Kingdom: Animalia
- Phylum: Chordata
- Class: Amphibia
- Order: Anura
- Family: Microhylidae
- Genus: Callulops
- Species: C. fuscus

Binomial name
- Callulops fuscus (Peters, 1867)

Species of frog

Callulops fuscus is a species of frog in the family Microhylidae. It is endemic to Indonesia. Its natural habitats are subtropical or tropical moist lowland forests and subtropical or tropical swamps. It is threatened by habitat loss.
