= Callulops sagittatus =

Conservation status
- Data Deficient (IUCN 3.1)

Scientific classification
- Kingdom: Animalia
- Phylum: Chordata
- Class: Amphibia
- Order: Anura
- Family: Microhylidae
- Genus: Callulops
- Species: C. sagittatus

Binomial name
- Callulops sagittatus Richards, Burton, Cunningham & Dennis, 1995

Species of frog

Callulops sagittatus is a species of frog in the family Microhylidae. It is found in Papua New Guinea and possibly Indonesia. Its natural habitat is subtropical or tropical moist montane forests. It is threatened by habitat loss.
