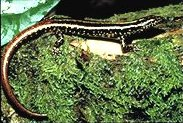

Scientific classification
- Kingdom: Animalia
- Phylum: Chordata
- Class: Reptilia
- Order: Squamata
- Family: Scincidae
- Genus: Ornithuroscincus
- Species: O. noctua

Binomial name
- Ornithuroscincus noctua (Lesson, 1830)

Synonyms
- Lipinia rouxi

= Ornithuroscincus noctua =

Species of lizard

Ornithuroscincus noctua, the moth skink, is a species of skink. It is found in Pacific regions including Sulawesi, Northern Papua New Guinea, Solomon Islands, Vanuatu, Tuamotu, Marquesas Islands, Pitcairn Islands, Hawaii, Indonesia, Fiji, Western Samoa, Admiralty Islands, Bismarck Archipelago, Tonga, Toga, Tegua, Cook Islands, Nauru and Guam.
