= Lepidodactylus zweifeli =

Conservation status
- Endangered (IUCN 3.1)

Scientific classification
- Kingdom: Animalia
- Phylum: Chordata
- Class: Reptilia
- Order: Squamata
- Suborder: Gekkota
- Family: Gekkonidae
- Genus: Lepidodactylus
- Species: L. zweifeli

Binomial name
- Lepidodactylus zweifeli Kraus, 2019

Species of lizard

Lepidodactylus zweifeli is a species of gecko. It is endemic to New Guinea and only known from the Adelbert Mountains in Madang Province, Papua New Guinea. It is named for Richard G. Zweifel, an American herpetologist.

Lepidodactylus zweifeli is known from two male specimens collected at 670 m (2,200 ft) above sea level from what is presumed to have been hill forest. They measure 41–45 mm (1.6–1.8 in) in snout–vent length.
