= Guadalcanal scaly-toed gecko =

Conservation status
- Data Deficient (IUCN 3.1)

Scientific classification
- Kingdom: Animalia
- Phylum: Chordata
- Class: Reptilia
- Order: Squamata
- Suborder: Gekkota
- Family: Gekkonidae
- Genus: Lepidodactylus
- Species: L. shebae

Binomial name
- Lepidodactylus shebae (Brown & Tanner, 1949)

Synonyms
- Pseudogekko shebae; Pseudogecko shebae

Species of lizard

The Guadalcanal scaly-toed gecko (Lepidodactylus shebae) is a species of gecko. It is endemic to Guadalcanal in the Solomon Islands.
