= Lepidodactylus mitchelli =

Scientific classification
- Kingdom: Animalia
- Phylum: Chordata
- Class: Reptilia
- Order: Squamata
- Suborder: Gekkota
- Family: Gekkonidae
- Genus: Lepidodactylus
- Species: L. mitchelli

Binomial name
- Lepidodactylus mitchelli Kraus, 2019

Species of gecko

Lepidodactylus mitchelli is a species of gecko. It is endemic to Papua New Guinea; the type locality is Boiaboiawaga Island in Milne Bay Province in the east of the country. The species was described in 2019 by Edward Kraus, and is named after his friend David Mitchell.
