= Lepidodactylus sacrolineatus =

Scientific classification
- Kingdom: Animalia
- Phylum: Chordata
- Class: Reptilia
- Order: Squamata
- Suborder: Gekkota
- Family: Gekkonidae
- Genus: Lepidodactylus
- Species: L. sacrolineatus

Binomial name
- Lepidodactylus sacrolineatus Kraus & Oliver, 2020

Species of lizard

Lepidodactylus sacrolineatus is a species of gecko. It is endemic to Papua New Guinea.
