= Lepidodactylus moestus =

Conservation status
- Least Concern (IUCN 3.1)

Scientific classification
- Kingdom: Animalia
- Phylum: Chordata
- Class: Reptilia
- Order: Squamata
- Suborder: Gekkota
- Family: Gekkonidae
- Genus: Lepidodactylus
- Species: L. moestus

Binomial name
- Lepidodactylus moestus (Peters, 1867)

Synonyms
- Gecko moestus

Species of lizard

Lepidodactylus moestus is a species of gecko. It is found in the Marshall Islands, Federated States of Micronesia, and Palau.
