= Lepidodactylus bakingibut =

Scientific classification
- Kingdom: Animalia
- Phylum: Chordata
- Class: Reptilia
- Order: Squamata
- Suborder: Gekkota
- Family: Gekkonidae
- Genus: Lepidodactylus
- Species: L. bakingibut

Binomial name
- Lepidodactylus bakingibut Eliades, Brown, Huang, & Siler, 2021

Species of lizard

Lepidodactylus bakingibut is a species of gecko. It is endemic to the Philippines.
