= Eduard Daniël van Oort =

Dutch ornithologist

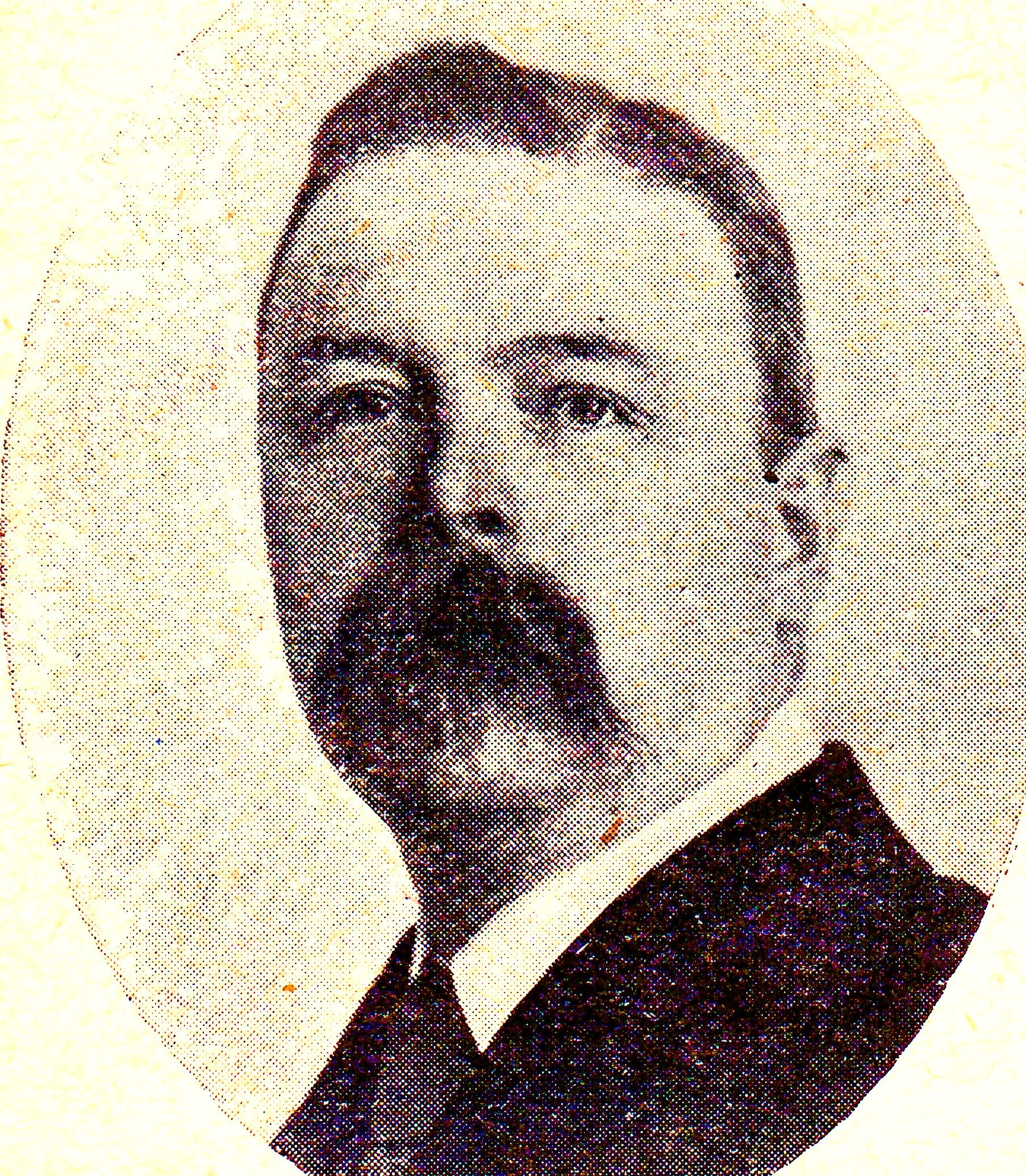
- Born: 31 October 1876; Barneveld, Gelderland, Netherlands
- Died: 21 September 1933 (aged 56); Leiden, Netherlands
- Scientific career
- Fields: Ornithology
- Institutions: Rijksmuseum of Natural History

Eduard Daniël van Oort (31 October 1876 in Barneveld, Gelderland – 21 September 1933 in Leiden) was a Dutch ornithologist.

Oort was in charge of the bird collections at the Rijksmuseum of Natural History in Leiden; in 1915 he was made Director of this museum, a position which he held until his death. He was the author of Ornithologia Neerlandica, de vogels van Nederland (1922-1935), with plates by Marinus Adrianus Koekkoek (1873-1944). These plates were later licensed by Harry Witherby for use in The Handbook of British Birds (1938-1941).

A species of Indonesian gecko, Lepidodactylus oortii, is named in his honor.
