= Fred Kraus =

American herpetologist (born 1959)

Edward Frederick "Fred" Kraus
- Born: June 12, 1959 (age 67)
- Education: University of Toledo (B.Sc.); University of Michigan (Ph.D.)
- Known for: Research on invasive species, taxonomy, and biogeography of Papuan herpetofauna
- Scientific career
- Fields: Herpetology
- Workplaces: University of Michigan; University of Florida; University of Hawaiʻi at Mānoa; Bernice P. Bishop Museum
- Thesis: An evaluation of the ontogeny polarization criterion in phylogenetic inference: a case study using the salamander genus ambystoma (1987)
- Doctoral advisor: Arnold G. Kluge

Edward Frederick "Fred" Kraus (born June 12, 1959) is an American herpetologist.

== Biography ==
Kraus earned his Bachelor of Science degree in 1980 from the University of Toledo. In the summer of 1980, he worked as a field biologist at the Ohio Department of Natural Resources. From 1980 to 1986, he was a research and teaching assistant in the Department of Biology at the University of Michigan. In 1987, he received his Ph.D. from the University of Michigan under Arnold G. Kluge with the dissertation An evaluation of the ontogeny polarization criterion in phylogenetic inference: a case study using the salamander genus ambystoma.

He completed his postdoctoral work from April 1988 to May 1990 as a research associate in the zoology department at the University of Florida. From July 1990 to March 1992, he was an assistant research scientist in the Department of Biology at the University of Michigan. In March 1991, he became a research associate with the Conservation Agency. From March 1992 to October 1996, he was again a research associate in the Department of Biology at the University of Michigan. From September 1996 to September 1997, he was an assistant research scientist at the University of Michigan Museum of Zoology.

From November 1997 to July 2001, Kraus worked as a research scientist at the Bernice P. Bishop Museum in Honolulu, Hawaii. From March 2001 to May 2010, he was a professor at the University of Hawaiʻi at Mānoa. Between November 1996 and July 2001, he also served as coordinator of the invasive species research and control program at the Hawaii Division of Forestry and Wildlife. From August 2001 to October 2012, he was a research zoologist at the Bishop Museum. From September 2012 to August 2013, he was an assistant research scientist at the University of Michigan, and from October 2012 to July 2013, a research biologist at Utah State University. From August 2013 to May 2014, he was an assistant research scientist and, since May 2014, he has been a research scientist at the University of Michigan.

Kraus's research projects include the evolution, systematics, and biogeography of the herpetofauna of Papua New Guinea, the evolution and conservation of island fauna (especially reptiles, amphibians, and land snails), the patterns, processes, and ecology of invasive species, and the development of risk assessment protocols for alien reptiles and amphibians.

He is a member of the American Society of Ichthyologists and Herpetologists, the Herpetologists’ League, the Society for the Study of Amphibians and Reptiles, and the Biological Society of Washington.

== Species described ==
Recent discoveries were four snakes in the genus Dendrelaphis in Papua New Guinea in 2025.

=== Amphibians ===
- Albericus exclamitans (Kraus & Allison, 2005)
- Albericus murritus (Kraus & Allison, 2009)
- Albericus sanguinopictus (Kraus & Allison, 2005)
- Ambystoma barbouri (Kraus & Petranka, 1989)
- Austrochaperina septentrionalis (Allison & Kraus, 2003)
- Callulops eremnosphax (Kraus & Allison, 2009)
- Callulops marmoratus (Kraus & Allison, 2003)
- Callulops omnistriatus (Kraus & Allison, 2009)
- Choerophryne longirostris (Kraus & Allison, 2001)
- Cophixalus bewaniensis (Kraus & Allison, 2000)
- Cophixalus caverniphilus (Kraus & Allison, 2009)
- Cophixalus cupricarenus (Kraus & Allison, 2009)
- Cophixalus desticans (Kraus & Allison, 2009)
- Cophixalus interruptus (Kraus & Allison, 2009)
- Cophixalus iovaorum (Kraus & Allison, 2009)
- Cophixalus kethuk (Kraus & Allison, 2009)
- Cophixalus linnaeus (Kraus & Allison, 2009)
- Cophixalus melanops (Kraus & Allison, 2009)
- Cophixalus phaeobalius (Kraus & Allison, 2009)
- Cophixalus pulchellus (Kraus & Allison, 2000)
- Cophixalus sisyphus (Kraus & Allison, 2006)
- Cophixalus timidus (Kraus & Allison, 2006)
- Cophixalus tomaiodactylus (Kraus & Allison, 2009)
- Cophixalus variabilis (Kraus & Allison, 2006)
- Hylarana waliesa (Kraus & Allison, 2007)
- Hylophorbus proekes (Kraus & Allison, 2009)
- Liophryne magnitympanum (Kraus & Allison, 2009)
- Litoria bibonius (Kraus & Allison, 2004)
- Litoria eschata (Kraus & Allison, 2009)
- Litoria flavescens (Kraus & Allison, 2004)
- Litoria rubrops (Kraus & Allison, 2004)
- Mantophryne axanthogaster (Kraus & Allison, 2009)
- Oreophryne anamiatoi (Kraus & Allison, 2009)
- Oreophryne ezra (Kraus & Allison, 2009)
- Platymantis browni (Allison & Kraus, 2001)
- Platymantis bufonulus (Kraus & Allison, 2007)
- Platymantis caesiops (Kraus & Allison, 2009)
- Platymantis manus (Kraus & Allison, 2009)
- Platymantis sulcatus (Kraus & Allison, 2007)
- Xenorhina adisca (Kraus & Allison, 2003)
- Xenorhina arboricola (Allison & Kraus, 2000)
- Xenorhina zweifeli (Kraus & Allison, 2002)

=== Reptiles ===
- Cyrtodactylus atremus (Kraus & Weijola, 2019)
- Cyrtodactylus epiroticus (Kraus, 2008)
- Cyrtodactylus klugei (Kraus, 2008)
- Cyrtodactylus murua (Kraus & Allison, 2006)
- Cyrtodactylus robustus (Kraus, 2008)
- Cyrtodactylus serratus (Kraus, 2007)
- Cyrtodactylus tripartitus (Kraus, 2008)
- Emoia beryllion (Kraus, 2018)
- Gerrhopilus addisoni (Kraus, 2017)
- Gerrhopilus eurydice (Kraus, 2017)
- Gerrhopilus flavinotatus (Kraus, 2023)
- Gerrhopilus hades (Kraus, 2005)
- Gerrhopilus lestes (Kraus, 2017)
- Gerrhopilus lorealis (Kraus, 2023)
- Gerrhopilus papuanorum (Kraus, 2023)
- Gerrhopilus persephone (Kraus, 2017)
- Gerrhopilus polyadenus (Kraus, 2023)
- Gerrhopilus slapcinskyi (Kraus, 2023)
- Gerrhopilus wallachi (Kraus, 2023)
- Hypsilurus capreolatus (Kraus & Myers, 2012)
- Lepidodactylus aignanus (Kraus, 2019)
- Lepidodactylus dialeukos (Kraus, 2019)
- Lepidodactylus kwasnickae (Kraus, 2019)
- Lepidodactylus laticinctus (Kraus, Vahtera, Varpu & Weijola, Valter, 2023)
- Lepidodactylus makira (Kraus, 2023)
- Lepidodactylus mitchelli (Kraus, 2019)
- Lepidodactylus pollostos (Karkkainen, Richards, Kraus, Tjaturadi, Krey & Oliver, 2020)
- Lepidodactylus sacrolineatus (Kraus & Oliver, 2020)
- Lepidodactylus zweifeli (Kraus, 2019)
- Lobulia fortis (Slavenko, Tamar, Tallowin, Kraus, Allison, Carranza & Meiri, 2021)
- Lobulia huonensis (Slavenko, Tamar, Tallowin, Kraus, Allison, Carranza & Meiri, 2021)
- Lobulia marmorata (Slavenko, Tamar, Tallowin, Kraus, Allison, Carranza & Meiri, 2021)
- Lobulia vogelkopensis (Slavenko, Tamar, Tallowin, Kraus, Allison, Carranza & Meiri, 2021)
- Nactus acutus (Kraus, 2005)
- Nactus sphaerodactylodes (Kraus, 2005)
- Ornithuroscincus bengaun (Slavenko, Tamar, Tallowin, Kraus, Allison, Carranza & Meiri, 2021)
- Ornithuroscincus inornatus (Slavenko, Tamar, Tallowin, Kraus, Allison, Carranza & Meiri, 2021)
- Ornithuroscincus pterophilus (Slavenko, Tamar, Tallowin, Kraus, Allison, Carranza & Meiri, 2021)
- Ornithuroscincus sabini (Kraus, 2020)
- Ornithuroscincus shearmani (Slavenko, Tamar, Tallowin, Kraus, Allison, Carranza & Meiri, 2021)
- Ornithuroscincus viridis (Slavenko, Tamar, Tallowin, Kraus, Allison, Carranza & Meiri, 2021)
- Toxicocalamus atratus (Kraus, Kaiser & O’Shea, 2022)
- Toxicocalamus cratermontanus (Kraus, 2017)
- Toxicocalamus mattisoni (Kraus, 2020)
- Toxicocalamus mintoni (Kraus, 2009)
- Toxicocalamus nigrescens (Kraus, 2017)
- Toxicocalamus pachysomus (Kraus, 2009)
- Toxicocalamus spilorhynchus (Kraus, Kaiser & O’Shea, 2022)
- Toxicocalamus vertebralis (Kraus, Kaiser & O’Shea, 2022)
- Tropidonophis dolasii (Kraus & Allison, 2004)
- Varanus bennetti (Weijola, Vahtera, Koch, Schmitz & Kraus, 2020)
- Varanus louisiadensis (Weijola & Kraus, 2023)
- Varanus tanimbar (Weijola & Kraus, 2023)

== Eponymy ==
In 2020, herpetologist George Robert Zug named the gecko species Nactus fredkrausi from Papua New Guinea in honor of Fred Kraus.
