= Lobulia =

Scientific classification
- Kingdom: Animalia
- Phylum: Chordata
- Class: Reptilia
- Order: Squamata
- Family: Scincidae
- Subfamily: Eugongylinae
- Genus: Lobulia; Greer, 1974

Species
- 7, see text.

Genus of reptiles

Lobulia is a genus of skinks in the subfamily Eugongylinae. The genus Lobulia is endemic to New Guinea.

== Species ==
There are 7 species:

- Lobulia brongersmai (Zweifel, 1972) – Brongersma's lobulia
- Lobulia elegans (Boulenger, 1897) – elegant lobulia
- Lobulia fortis Slavenko, Tamar, Tallowin, Kraus, Allison, Carranza, & Meiri, 2021
- Lobulia huonensis Slavenko, Tamar, Tallowin, Kraus, Allison, Carranza, & Meiri, 2021
- Lobulia lobulus (Loveridge, 1945) – elegant lobulia
- Lobulia marmorata Slavenko, Tamar, Tallowin, Kraus, Allison, Carranza, & Meiri, 2021
- Lobulia vogelkopensis Slavenko, Tamar, Tallowin, Kraus, Allison, Carranza, & Meiri, 2021

Nota bene: A binomial authority in parentheses indicates that the species was originally described in a genus other than Lobulia.
