= Callulops robustus =

Conservation status
- Least Concern (IUCN 3.1)

Scientific classification
- Kingdom: Animalia
- Phylum: Chordata
- Class: Amphibia
- Order: Anura
- Family: Microhylidae
- Genus: Callulops
- Species: C. robustus

Binomial name
- Callulops robustus (Boulenger, 1898)

Synonyms
- Mantophryne robusta Boulenger, 1898

Species of amphibian

Callulops robustus (commonly known as Boulenger's callulops frog or robust frog) is a species of frog in the family Microhylidae. It has traditionally been considered as wide-ranging species found in both Western New Guinea (Indonesia) and Papua New Guinea. However, it is likely that specimens from the type locality, Misima Island, and New Guinea represent different species. If so, name Callulops robustus belongs to the Misima Island species, and the mainland species is unnamed. Other island populations may or may not belong to Callulops robustus. Callulops microtis from the mainland has already been removed from synonymy with Callulops robustus.

== Description ==
Callulops robustus are moderately large frogs: males grow to a snout–vent length of 61–65 mm (2.4–2.6 in) and females to 60–78 mm (2.4–3.1 in). Snout is long. Adults are reddish-brown or grey brown above. Chin, chest, and under limbs are dark purple brown. Colouration in juveniles is quite different: with black head and limbs, brick-red dorsum and sides, with scattered minute blue-white flecks.

== Habitat and conservation ==
Callulops robustus is widespread species (see, however, the caveat on species identity) but occurs at relatively low densities. It occurs in lowland and hill rainforests and also in modified or disturbed habitats (degraded forests and forest edges, rural gardens, and near landslides) at elevations of up to 1,920 m (6,300 ft) asl. It burrows in the forest floor and breeds by direct development. There are no significant threats to this species.
