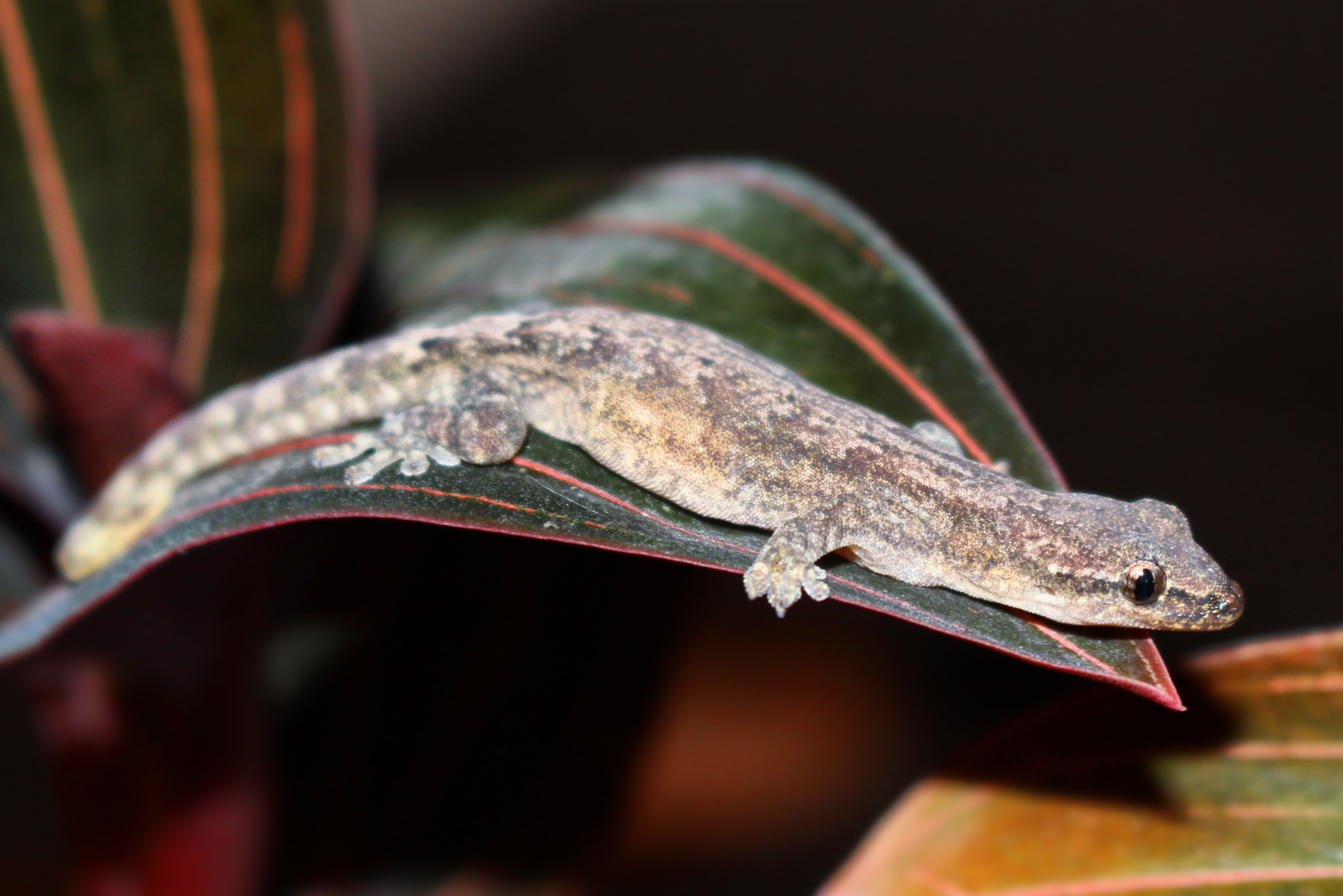

Conservation status
- Least Concern (IUCN 3.1)

Scientific classification
- Kingdom: Animalia
- Phylum: Chordata
- Class: Reptilia
- Order: Squamata
- Suborder: Gekkota
- Family: Gekkonidae
- Genus: Lepidodactylus
- Species: L. lugubris

Binomial name
- Lepidodactylus lugubris (Duméril & Bibron, 1836)

Synonyms
- List: Platydactylus lugubris; Platydactylus crepuscularis; Amydosaurus lugubris; Peropus neglectus; Hemidactylus meijeri; Dactyloperus pomareae; Peripia cantoris; Peripia lugubris; Peripia meyeri; Peripia mysorensis; Peripia ornata; Peropus roseus; Peropus variegatus ogasawarasimae; Gecko harrieti; Gecko lugubris; Gymnodactylus caudeloti; Lepidodactylus crepuscularis; Lepidodactylus roseus; Lepidodactylus candeloti; Lepidodactylus ceylonensis; Lepidodactylus divergens; Lepidodactylus mysorensis; Gehyra variegata ogasawarasimae; Gehyra ogasawarisimae; Gehyra iogasawarasinae

= Lepidodactylus lugubris =

Species of lizard

Lepidodactylus lugubris, known as the mourning gecko or common smooth-scaled gecko, is a species of lizard, a gecko of the family Gekkonidae.

== Distribution ==
This species is widespread in coastal regions of the Indian and Pacific oceans, including the Maldives, Sri Lanka, India, Myanmar, Malaysia, Vietnam, Thailand, Cambodia, Japan, Taiwan, China, Indonesia, Singapore, Philippines, Papua New Guinea, Fiji, Australia (Cocos Island), Western Samoa, Guam, the Society Islands, Pitcairn, and the Mascarene Islands.

It has been introduced widely in the Neotropics, including in Mexico, Brazil, Guatemala, Honduras, El Salvador, Nicaragua, Costa Rica, Panama, Florida, The Bahamas, Guadeloupe, Ecuador (including the Galapagos), Colombia and Chile, as well as to Hawai'i and the Seychelles in the Indian Ocean.

== Description ==
Lepidodactylus lugubris measure 8.5–10 cm in length including tail (4–4.4 cm snout-to-vent). L. lugubris is cryptically coloured, typically light to dark tan with dark spots down the length of its back and a brown strip from the ear to the tip of the nose. This species is capable of changing color, and so the same individual may appear light or dark at different times during the day.

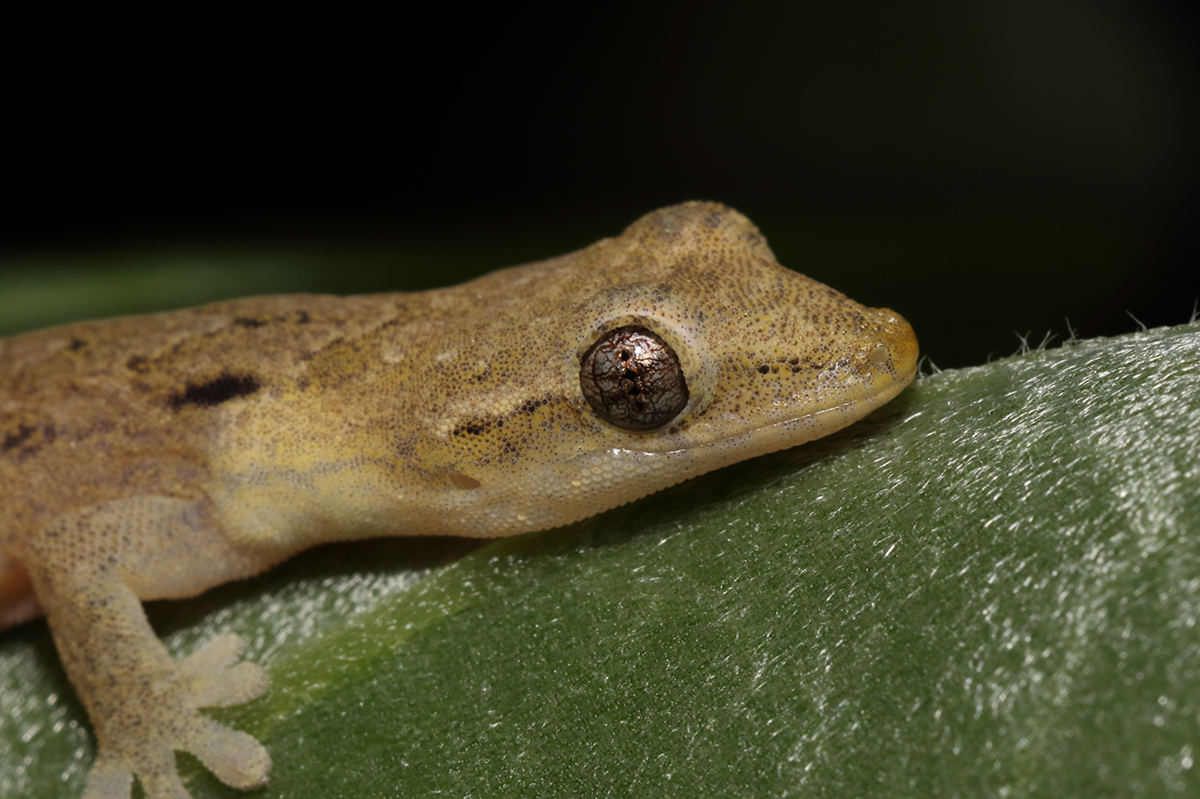
Lady Elliot Island, Australia

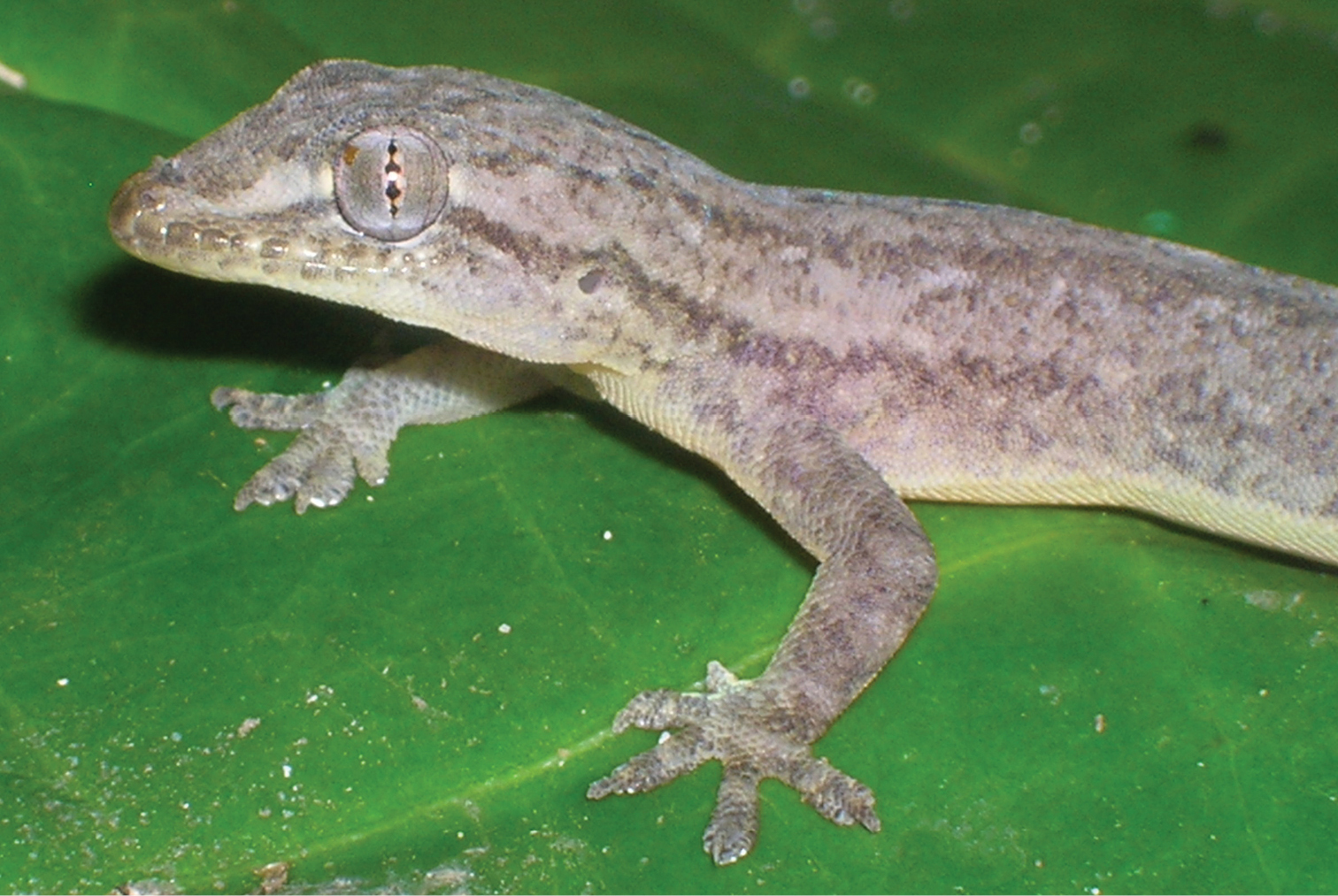
Nicaragua

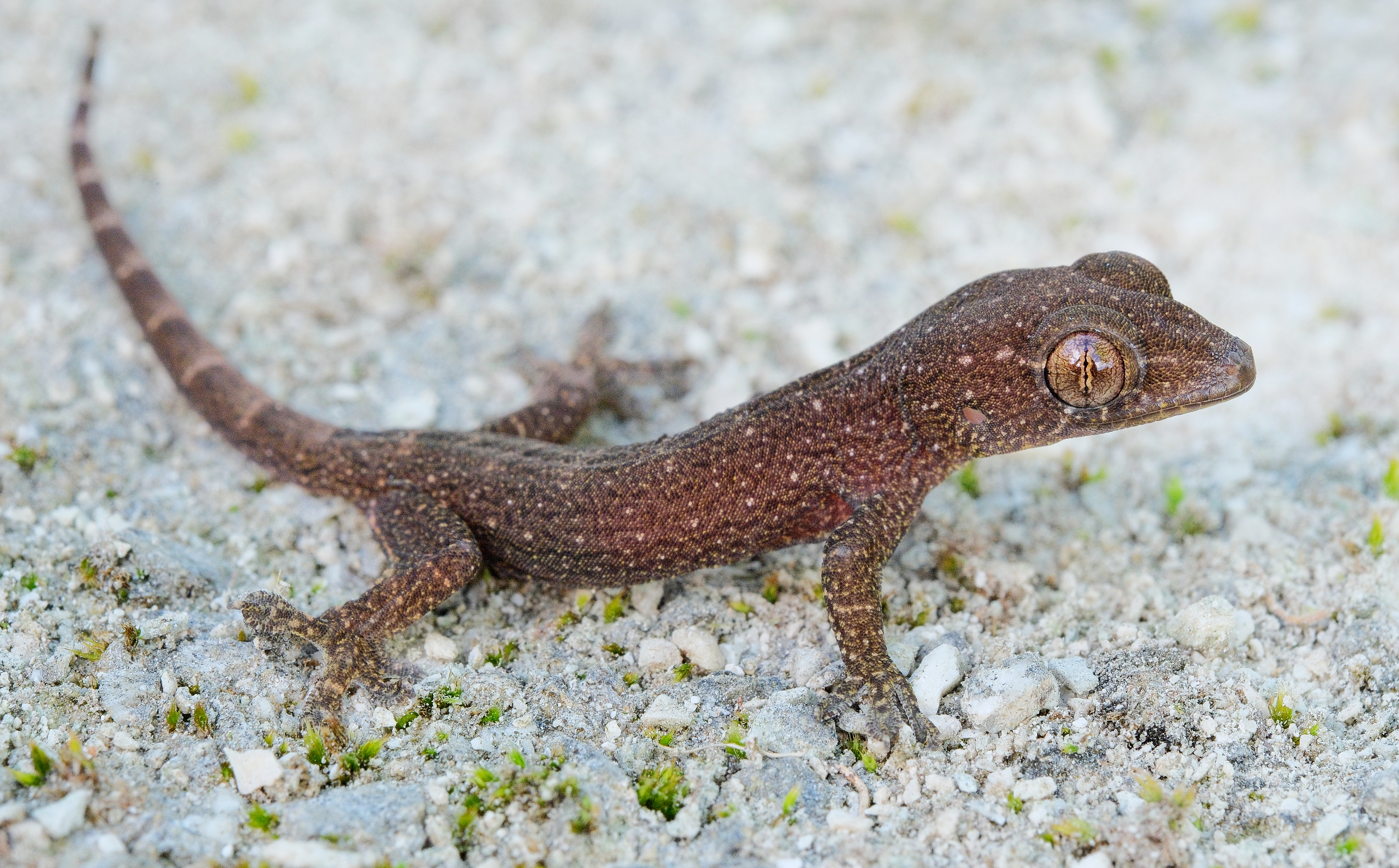
Niue

== Behavior and ecology ==
L. lugubris is primarily nocturnal, but is occasionally encountered exposed but near cover during the day.

This species is all female, and reproduces via parthenogenesis. While males occasionally occur, they are very rare and often sterile. Females lay 1–2 eggs at a time, and glue them to surfaces in protected locations. Clutches are laid every 4–6 weeks.

The obligate parthenogenetic mechanism involves premeiotic endoreplication of the chromosomes.

== Diet ==
L. lugubris are omnivorous. In the wild, they eat a varied diet of insects, spiders, amphipods, pill bugs, fruit, nectar, pollen, and even their own eggs. They will also feed on jam, sugar, sweetened drinks, and milk, if given the opportunity.

== Captivity ==
L. lugubris are occasionally kept as pets due to their simple care requirements and social nature. Because they are parthenogenic, these geckos reproduce well in captivity and thus most individuals kept as pets are captive-bred.
