= Henry B. Guppy =

British geologist and botanist (1854–1926)

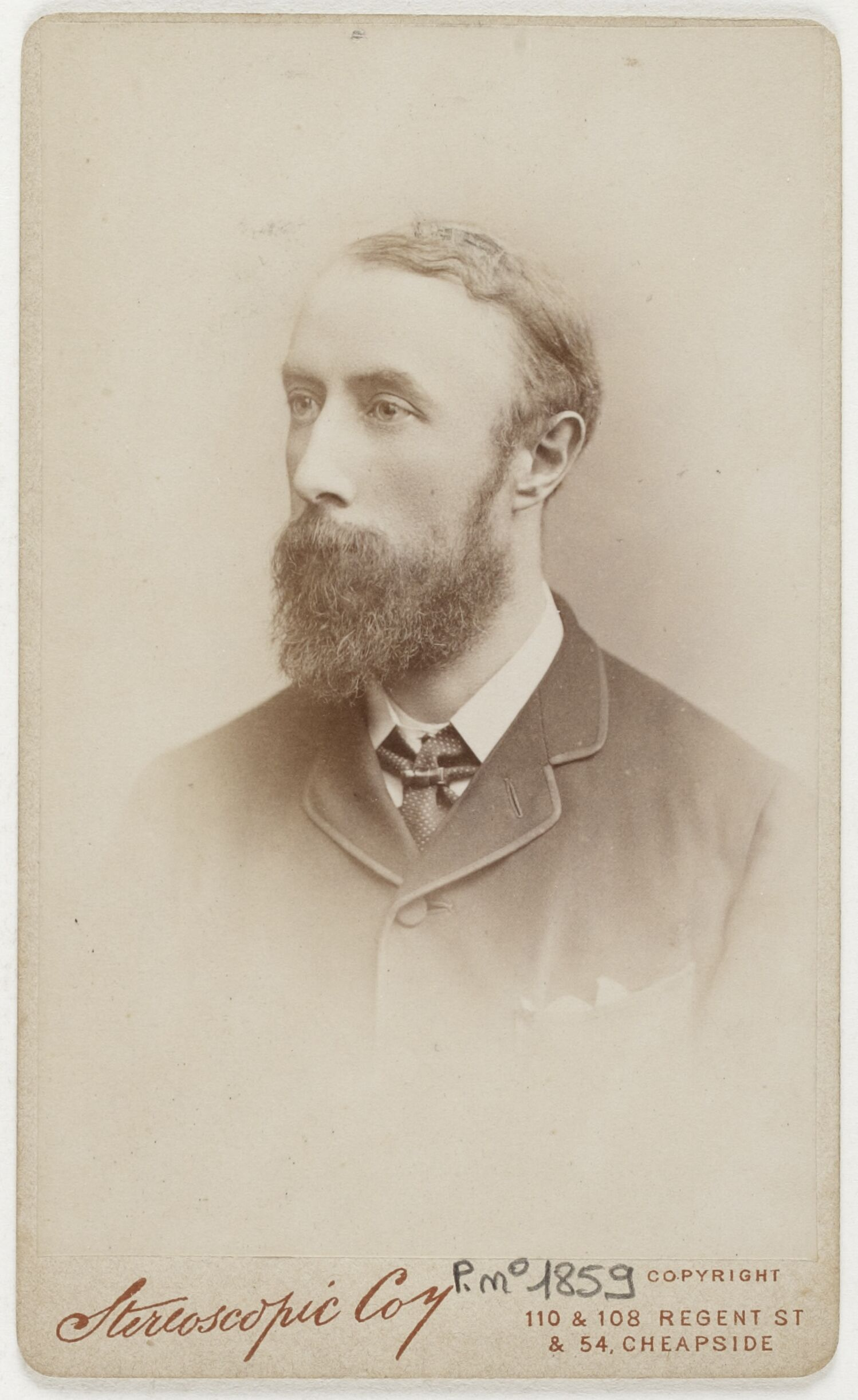
Portrait photograph of Henry B. Guppy

Henry Brougham Guppy FRS FRSE FLS (23 December 1854 – 23 April 1926) was a British surgeon, geologist, botanist and photographer. He was awarded the Linnean Medal in 1917.

== Life ==
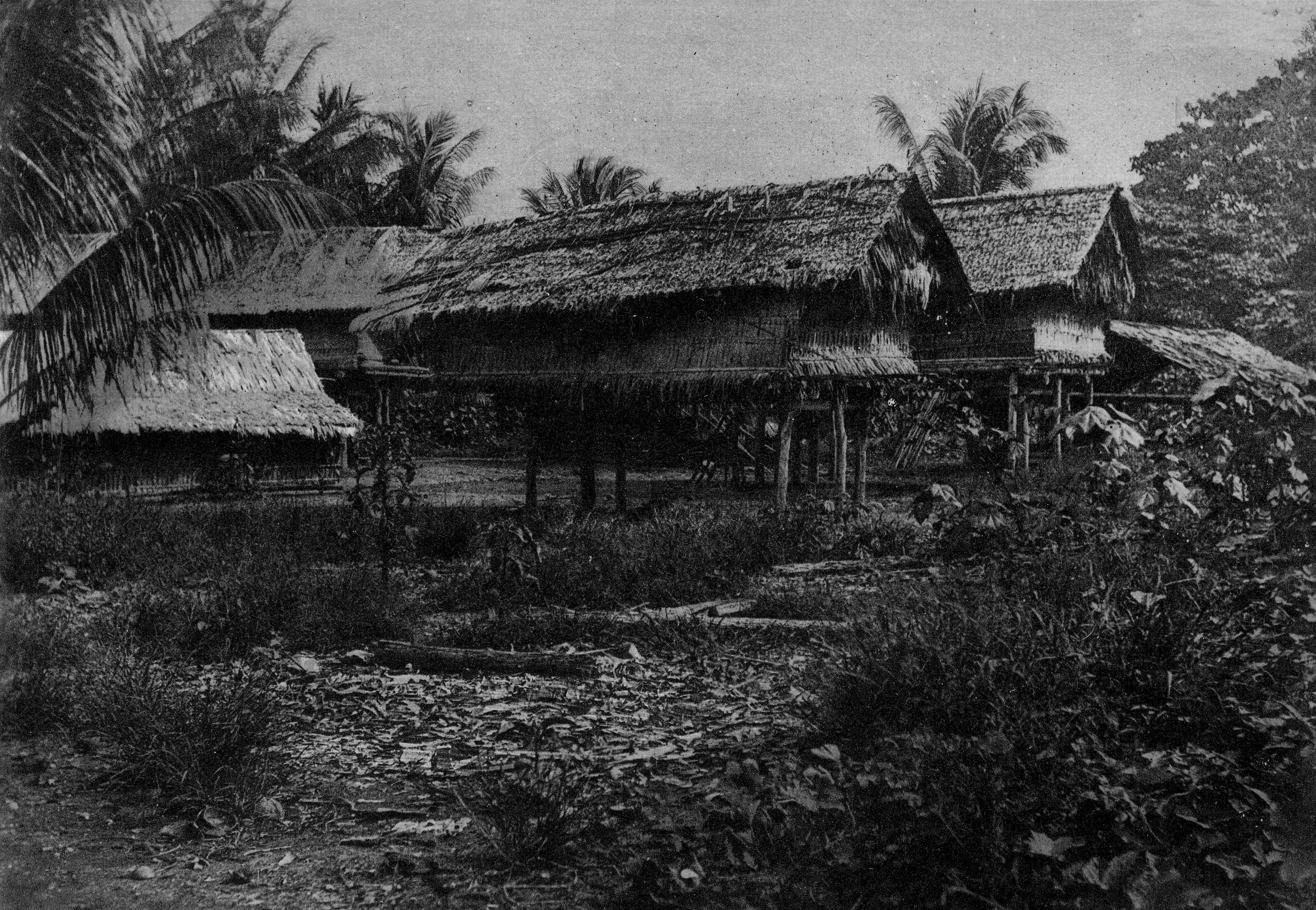
Pile dwellings in Fauro Island, photographed by Guppy

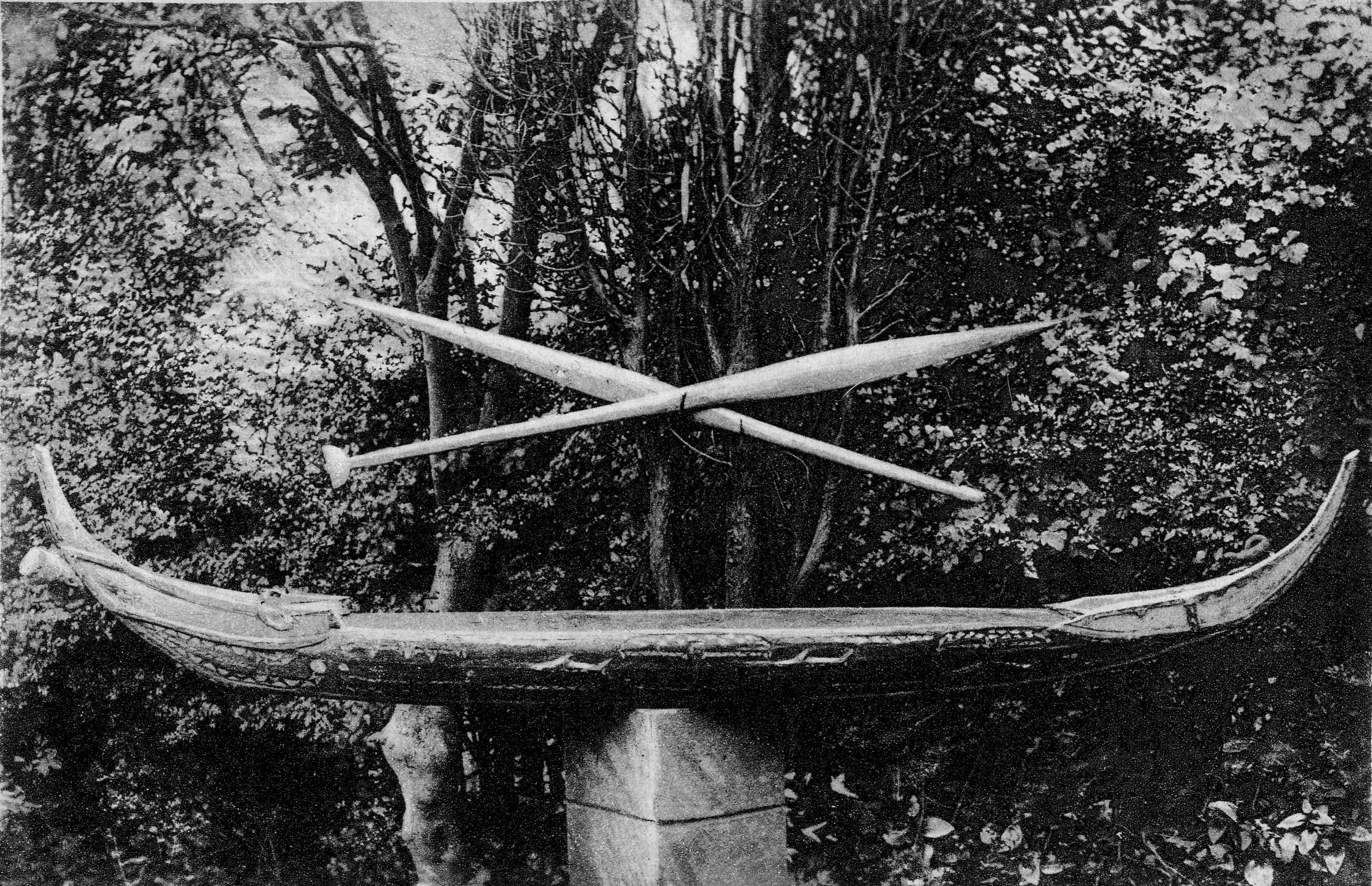
St. Christobal canoe, photographed by Guppy

He was born in Falmouth on the English coast the son of Dr. Thomas Stokes Guppy (1812–1893) a local physician, and his wife Charlott Ann Brougham (1826–1894). He was educated at Sherborne, and studied medicine at Queen's College in Birmingham then Edinburgh University where he graduated MB CM. He worked as a surgeon in the Royal Navy from 1876 to 1885. He served on board HMS Hornet in the South China Seas and HMS Lark (a survey ship) in the western Pacific (especially the Solomon Islands). He also spent a long time on shore in 1878 in Korea.

In 1888 he was elected a Fellow of the Royal Society of Edinburgh. His proposers were Sir William Turner, Hugh Robert Mill and Alexander Buchan. He was elected a Fellow of the Royal Society of London in 1918.

In 1896 he returned to the Pacific to begin extensive geological and botanical research. This included investigations of the coral reefs at the Keeling Islands; and work in Java, Hawaii and Fiji. This work took him until 1899. He returned to Britain for several years to analyse his findings and write on them, then from 1906 to 1914 he made studies in the West Indies and the Azores. The First World War curtailed travel possibilities and he resumed with further Pacific adventures in 1919.

He died en route from Tahiti to Britain on board the SS El Kantara whilst moored at Martinique.

== Family ==
He married twice: firstly in 1887 to Mary Annie Jordan (b.1854) (whilst still in the Navy); secondly in 1900 to Letitia Warde of Yalding in Kent.

== Legacy ==
Henry Brougham Guppy is commemorated in the scientific names of two species of reptiles: a gecko, Lepidodactylus guppyi, which is endemic to the Solomon Islands; and a snake, Uropeltis broughami, which is endemic to southern India. Specimens collected by Guppy are cared for at the National Herbarium of Victoria (MEL), Royal Botanic Gardens Victoria.

== Publications ==
- 1879: Henry Good Guppy: His Life and Death at Erzeroum. London: Virtue & Co (See Battle of Erzurum (1877) and Turkish Red Crescent.)
- 1887: The Solomon Islands and Their Natives. London: Swan Sonnenschein, Lowrey & Co.
- 1887: The Solomon Islands: Their Geology, General Features, and Suitability for Colonization. London: Swan Sonnenschein, Lowrey & Co.
- 1890: Homes of Family Names in Great Britain. London: Harrison and Sons. lxv, 601 pp.
- 1903 & 1906: Observations of a Naturalist in the Pacific Between 1896 and 1899. 2 vols. London: Macmillan. Vol. I: Vanua Levu, Fiji: A Description of Its Leading Physical and Geological Characters (1903); Vol. II: Plant Dispersal (1906).
- 1912: Studies in Seeds and Fruits: An Investigation with the Balance—HathiTrust
  - Studies in Seeds and Fruits: An Investigation with the Balance—New York Botanical Garden's Mertz Library
- 1917: Plants, Seeds, and Currents in the West Indies and Azores: The Results of Investigations Carried Out in Those Regions Between 1906 and 1914
  - Plants, Seeds, and Currents in the West Indies and Azores: The Results of Investigations Carried Out in Those Regions Between 1906 and 1914—New York Botanical Garden's Mertz Library
