= List of endemic amphibians of Papua New Guinea =

This is a list of the endemic amphibian species recorded in Papua New Guinea.

== Species ==
=== Ceratobatrachidae ===
- Cornufer adiastolus
- Cornufer admiraltiensis, Admiralty wrinkled ground frog
- Cornufer akarithymus, Pomugu wrinkled ground frog
- Cornufer boulengeri, Boulenger's wrinkled ground frog
- Cornufer citrinospilus
- Cornufer elegans
- Cornufer exedrus
- Cornufer gigas
- Cornufer gilliardi, Gilliard's wrinkled ground frog
- Cornufer latro, Manus wrinkled ground frog
- Cornufer macrosceles, Ti wrinkled ground frog
- Cornufer magnus, Kavieng wrinkled ground frog
- Cornufer malukuna
- Cornufer mamusiorum, Mamusi wrinkled ground frog
- Cornufer mediodiscus
- Cornufer minutus
- Cornufer montanus
- Cornufer nakanaiorum, Nakanai wrinkled ground frog
- Cornufer nexipus, Baining wrinkled ground frog
- Cornufer schmidti, Schmidt's wrinkled ground frog
- Cornufer sulcatus
- Cornufer vogti
- Platymantis browni, Brown's wrinkled ground frog
- Platymantis bufonulus
- Platymantis caesiops
- Platymantis macrops, Aresi wrinkled ground frog
- Platymantis manus
- Platymantis mimicus, Numundo wrinkled ground frog
- Platymantis myersi, Myers' wrinkled ground frog
- Platymantis parkeri, Parker's wrinkled ground frog

=== Hylidae ===
- Litoria albolabris, Wandolleck's white-lipped tree frog
- Litoria auae
- Litoria becki, Beck's tree frog
- Litoria bibonius
- Litoria bulmeri, Bulmer's tree frog
- Litoria callista
- Litoria chloristona
- Litoria chrisdahli
- Litoria contrastens, Barabuna tree frog
- Litoria darlingtoni, Darlington's Madang tree frog
- Litoria dorsalis, dwarf rocket frog
- Litoria dorsivena, eastern mountains tree frog
- Litoria eschata
- Litoria exophthalmia
- Litoria flavescens
- Litoria graminea, northern New Guinea tree frog
- Litoria hilli
- Litoria hunti
- Litoria impura, southern New Guinea tree frog
- Litoria jeudii
- Litoria kumae
- Litoria leucova, West Sepik tree frog
- Litoria lodesdema
- Litoria louisiadensis, Rossell tree frog
- Litoria majikthise
- Litoria multiplica, Kassam tree frog
- Litoria nullicedens
- Litoria oenicolen, Trauna River tree frog
- Litoria ollauro
- Litoria pallidofemora
- Litoria pronimia
- Litoria prora, Efogi tree frog
- Litoria robinsonae
- Litoria rubrops
- Litoria sauroni
- Litoria singadanae
- Litoria spartacus
- Litoria spinifera, spiny tree frog
- Litoria timida, Menemsorae tree frog
- Litoria vocivincens, Brown River tree frog
- Nyctimystes avocalis, loud big-eyed tree frog
- Nyctimystes bivocalis
- Nyctimystes calcaratus
- Nyctimystes cheesmani, Cheesman's big-eyed tree frog
- Nyctimystes cryptochrysos
- Nyctimystes daymani, Dayman big-eyed tree frog
- Nyctimystes disruptus, Madang big-eyed tree frog
- Nyctimystes eucavatus
- Nyctimystes foricula, Kaironk big-eyed tree frog
- Nyctimystes gularis, Mondo big-eyed tree frog
- Nyctimystes intercastellus
- Nyctimystes kubori, sandy big-eyed tree frog
- Nyctimystes kuduki
- Nyctimystes latratus
- Nyctimystes myolae
- Nyctimystes narinosus, common big-eyed tree frog
- Nyctimystes obsoletus, Simbang big-eyed tree frog
- Nyctimystes ocreptus
- Nyctimystes papua, Papua big-eyed tree frog
- Nyctimystes perimetri, archipelago big-eyed tree frog
- Nyctimystes persimilis, Milne big-eyed tree frog
- Nyctimystes semipalmatus, Kokoda big-eyed tree frog
- Nyctimystes trachydermis, Morobe big-eyed tree frog
- Nyctimystes traunae
- Nyctimystes tyleri
- Nyctimystes zweifeli, Zweifel's big-eyed tree frog

=== Microhylidae ===
- Aphantophryne minuta, Myola New Guinea frog
- Aphantophryne pansa, Scratchley New Guinea frog
- Aphantophryne sabini, Guest House New Guinea frog
- Asterophrys leucopus, Stolle New Guinea bush frog
- Austrochaperina adamantina, Nibo land frog
- Austrochaperina alexanderi, Alexander's land frog
- Austrochaperina aquilonia, Somoro land frog
- Austrochaperina archboldi, Archbold's land frog
- Austrochaperina brevipes, Victoria land frog
- Austrochaperina guttata, spotted land frog
- Austrochaperina hooglandi, Hoogland's land frog
- Austrochaperina laurae, Laura's land frog
- Austrochaperina mehelyi, Mehely's land frog
- Austrochaperina novaebritanniae, New Britain land frog
- Austrochaperina palmipes, Dayman land frog
- Austrochaperina parkeri, Parker's land frog
- Austrochaperina polysticta, Morobe land frog
- Austrochaperina rivularis, Finalbin land frog
- Austrochaperina septentrionalis, northern land frog
- Austrochaperina yelaensis, Yela land frog
- Barygenys apodasta
- Barygenys atra, Gunther's Papua frog
- Barygenys cheesmanae, Cheesman's Papua frog
- Barygenys exsul, Zwefel's Papua frog
- Barygenys flavigularis, yellow-throated Papua frog
- Barygenys maculata, spotted Papua frog
- Barygenys nana, Highland Papua frog
- Barygenys parvula, Madang Papua frog
- Barygenys resima
- Callulops comptus, ornate callulops frog
- Callulops doriae, Doria's callulops frog
- Callulops eremnosphax
- Callulops glandulosus, warty callulops frog
- Callulops humicola, Kotuni callulops frog
- Callulops marmoratus, marbled callulops frog
- Callulops mediodiscus
- Callulops microtis
- Callulops omnistriatus
- Callulops robustus, robust callulops frog
- Callulops sagittatus, Binnie callulops frog
- Callulops stictogaster, Irumbofoie callulops frog
- Callulops wilhelmanus, Wilhelm callulops frog
- Choerophryne allisoni, Allison's mountain frog
- Choerophryne alpestris
- Choerophryne bickfordi
- Choerophryne brevicrus
- Choerophryne brunhildae, Adelbert rainforest frog
- Choerophryne bryonopsis
- Choerophryne burtoni, Burton's mountain frog
- Choerophryne darlingtoni, Darlington's rainforest frog
- Choerophryne epirrhina
- Choerophryne exclamitans
- Choerophryne fafniri, mid-montane rainforest frog
- Choerophryne gracilirostris
- Choerophryne grylloides
- Choerophryne gudrunae, Kowat rainforest frog
- Choerophryne gunnari, Gunnar's rainforest frog
- Choerophryne longirostris, Menawa mountain frog
- Choerophryne murrita
- Choerophryne pandanicola
- Choerophryne rhenaurum, Moiyok rainforest frog
- Choerophryne rostellifer, Torricelli mountain frog
- Choerophryne sanguinopicta, Mount Simpson rainforest frog
- Choerophryne siegfriedi, Siegfried's rainforest frog
- Choerophryne swanhildae, Southern Highlands rainforest frog
- Choerophryne tubercula, warty rainforest frog
- Choerophryne valkuriarum, Hidden Valley rainforest frog
- Cophixalus albolineatus
- Cophixalus amabilis
- Cophixalus ateles, Papua rainforest frog
- Cophixalus bewaniensis, Menawa rainforest frog
- Cophixalus caverniphilus
- Cophixalus cheesmanae, Kokoda rainforest frog
- Cophixalus clapporum
- Cophixalus cryptotympanum, Zweifel's rainforest frog
- Cophixalus cupricarenus
- Cophixalus daymani, Dayman rainforest frog
- Cophixalus desticans
- Cophixalus interruptus
- Cophixalus iovaorum
- Cophixalus kaindiensis, Kaindi rainforest frog
- Cophixalus kethuk
- Cophixalus linnaeus
- Cophixalus melanops
- Cophixalus misimae, Misima rainforest frog
- Cophixalus nexipus
- Cophixalus nubicola, Michael rainforest frog
- Cophixalus parkeri, Parker's rainforest frog
- Cophixalus phaeobalius
- Cophixalus pipilans, sempi rainforest frog
- Cophixalus pulchellus, pretty rainforest frog
- Cophixalus riparius, Wilhelm rainforest frog
- Cophixalus shellyi, Shelly's rainforest frog
- Cophixalus sphagnicola, Morobe rainforest frog
- Cophixalus tagulensis, Tagula rainforest frog
- Cophixalus tenuidactylus
- Cophixalus timidus, Simpson rainforest frog
- Cophixalus tomaiodactylus
- Cophixalus variabilis, Pekopekowana rainforest frog
- Cophixalus verecundus, Myola rainforest frog
- Cophixalus verrucosus, Oroke rainforest frog
- Cophixalus viridis, green rainforest frog
- Cophixalus wempi
- Copiula annanoreenae, Anna Noreen's Mehely frog
- Copiula fistulans, Lae Mehely frog
- Copiula lennarti, Lennart's Mehely frog
- Copiula minor, Milne Bay Mehely frog
- Copiula oxyrhina, Misima Mehely frog
- Genyophryne thomsoni, Thomson's toothless frog
- Hylophorbus atrifasciatus
- Hylophorbus infulata
- Hylophorbus proekes, Richard's Mawatta frog
- Hylophorbus rainerguentheri, Huon Mawatta frog
- Hylophorbus richardsi
- Hylophorbus sigridae, Sigrid's Mawatta frog
- Liophryne allisoni, Morobe land frog
- Liophryne dentata, Alotau land frog
- Liophryne magnitympanum
- Liophryne miniafia
- Liophryne rhododactyla, Owen Stanley land frog
- Liophryne rubra, ruddy land frog
- Liophryne similis, Myola land frog
- Mantophryne axanthogaster
- Mantophryne insignis
- Mantophryne louisiadensis, Louisiade Archipelago frog
- Mantophryne menziesi, Iarowari school frog
- Metamagnusia slateri, Slater's callulops frog
- Oreophryne albomaculata, speckled cross frog
- Oreophryne ampelos
- Oreophryne anamiatoi
- Oreophryne anser
- Oreophryne anthonyi, Anthony's cross frog
- Oreophryne aurora
- Oreophryne banshee
- Oreophryne brachypus, Gazelle cross frog
- Oreophryne brunnea
- Oreophryne cameroni
- Oreophryne curator, Minder's cross frog
- Oreophryne equus
- Oreophryne ezra
- Oreophryne flavomaculata
- Oreophryne gagneorum
- Oreophryne geislerorum, Madang cross frog
- Oreophryne geminus, twin cross frog
- Oreophryne graminus
- Oreophryne hypsiops, sempi cross frog
- Oreophryne inornata, dull cross frog
- Oreophryne insulana, Goodenough cross frog
- Oreophryne kampeni, Moroka cross frog
- Oreophryne lemur
- Oreophryne loriae, Port Moresby cross frog
- Oreophryne matawan
- Oreophryne meliades
- Oreophryne notata, Ialibu cross frog
- Oreophryne oviprotector
- Oreophryne parkopanorum
- Oreophryne penelopeia
- Oreophryne philosylleptoris
- Oreophryne phoebe
- Oreophryne picticrus
- Oreophryne pseudunicolor
- Oreophryne streiffeleri
- Oreophryne terrestris, terrestrial cross frog
- Oreophryne wolterstorffi, Wolterstorff's cross frog
- Oxydactyla alpestris, Gomgale land frog
- Oxydactyla coggeri, Kaironk land frog
- Oxydactyla crassa, Papua land frog
- Oxydactyla stenodactyla, Piunde-Aunde land frog
- Paedophryne amauensis
- Paedophryne dekot
- Paedophryne kathismaphlox
- Paedophryne oyatabu
- Paedophryne swiftorum
- Paedophryne verrucosa
- Xenorhina arboricola
- Xenorhina brachyrhyncha
- Xenorhina fuscigula, Kaironk fanged frog
- Xenorhina huon, Morobe fanged frog
- Xenorhina mehelyi, Mehely's fanged frog
- Xenorhina subcrocea, Lae fanged frog
- Xenorhina tillacki, Tillack's snouted frog
- Xenorhina tumulus, Madang fanged frog
- Xenorhina zweifeli, Zweifel's fanged frog

=== Myobatrachidae ===
- Mixophyes hihihorlo, Namosado barred frog

=== Ranidae ===
- Papurana milneana, Milne Bay frog
- Papurana supragrisea, Papua gray frog
- Papurana waliesa

== See also ==
- Fauna of New Guinea
- List of endemic reptiles of Papua New Guinea
- List of endemic fish of Papua New Guinea
- List of birds of Papua New Guinea
- List of butterflies of Papua New Guinea
- List of mammals of Papua New Guinea
