= Nyctimystes ocreptus =

Scientific classification
- Kingdom: Animalia
- Phylum: Chordata
- Class: Amphibia
- Order: Anura
- Family: Pelodryadidae
- Genus: Nyctimystes
- Species: N. ocreptus

Binomial name
- Nyctimystes ocreptus Menzies, 2014

Species of frog

Nyctimystes ocreptus is a species of tree frog in the subfamily Pelodryadinae, endemic to Papua New Guinea. Scientists have observed it on Mount Albert Edward, 2600 meters above sea level. Some may also live on Mount Victoria or Mount Knutsford.

This frog has brown eyes. The veins in its lower eyelid extend in all directions in a netlike pattern. This frog's skin is gold-green to gray-green in color. Its belly is white with purple and brown marks.

Scientists place this frog in the same species group as the common big-eyed tree frog, Nyctimystes narinosus.

The name of this frog is derived from "oculus in rete captus," which means "eye caught in a net."
