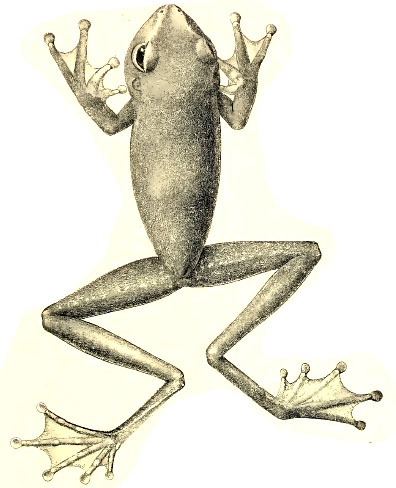
- Holotype of Nyctimystes montanus. Illustration from the original species description by Wilhelm Peters and Giacomo Doria (1878).

Conservation status
- Data Deficient (IUCN 3.1)

Scientific classification
- Kingdom: Animalia
- Phylum: Chordata
- Class: Amphibia
- Order: Anura
- Family: Hylidae
- Genus: Nyctimystes
- Species: N. montanus

Binomial name
- Nyctimystes montanus (Peters and Doria, 1878)

Synonyms
- Hyla (Litoria) montana Peters and Doria, 1878; Nyctimystes montana (Peters and Doria, 1878); Litoria montana (Peters and Doria, 1878)

= Nyctimystes montanus =

Mountain big-eyed tree frog

Species of amphibian

Nyctimystes montanus (common name: mountain big-eyed tree frog) is a species of frog in the subfamily Pelodryadinae. It is endemic to the Arfak Mountains, located in the Bird's Head Peninsula of northwestern New Guinea. This species is only known from its type locality ("Hatam sul Monte Arfak"). There are no records of this species after it was described in 1878, perhaps because of lack of surveys.

== Description ==
The holotype—and the only known specimen—is an adult male collected by Odoardo Beccari in 1875. It measures 62 mm (2.4 in) in snout–vent length. The tympanum is small. The skin of dorsum is smooth. It resembles Nyctimystes kuduki but has a snout that is distinctly truncate at the tip (angular in N. kuduki). The palpebral venation has many horizontal connections (other Nyctimystes have only vertically oriented veins).

== Habitat and conservation ==
The ecology and current population status of this species are essentially unknown. It is a montane frog that probably lives in streams in tropical rainforest. Threats to it are unknown. The type locality is within the Arfak Mountains National Park.
