= Nyctimystes myolae =

Conservation status
- Least Concern (IUCN 3.1)

Scientific classification
- Kingdom: Animalia
- Phylum: Chordata
- Class: Amphibia
- Order: Anura
- Family: Pelodryadidae
- Genus: Nyctimystes
- Species: N. myolae

Binomial name
- Nyctimystes myolae Menzies, 2014

Species of frog

Nyctimystes myolae is a species of tree frog in the subfamily Pelodryadinae, endemic to Papua New Guinea. Scientists observed this frog near the village of Myola village, at 2000 meters above sea level.

This frog is brown in color. Scientists place it in the same species group as the common big-eyed tree frog, Nyctimystes narinosus.
