= Nyctimystes pulcher =

Conservation status
- Least Concern (IUCN 3.1)

Scientific classification
- Kingdom: Animalia
- Phylum: Chordata
- Class: Amphibia
- Order: Anura
- Family: Hylidae
- Genus: Nyctimystes
- Species: N. pulcher

Binomial name
- Nyctimystes pulcher (Wandolleck, 1911)

Species of amphibian

Nyctimystes pulcher, the spurred big-eyed tree frog, is a species of frog in the subfamily Pelodryadinae, found in New Guinea. Its natural habitats are subtropical or tropical moist lowland forests, subtropical or tropical moist montane forests, and rivers.
