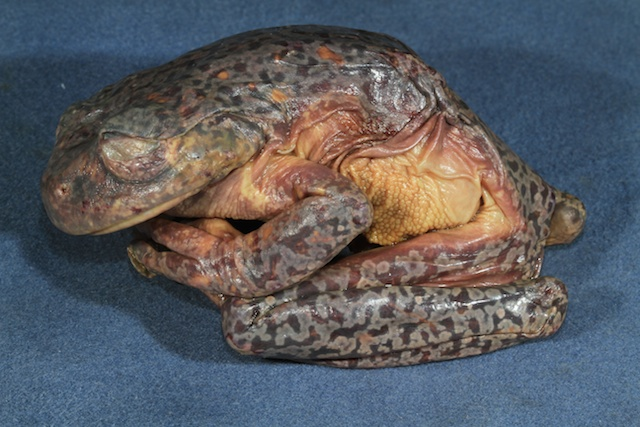

Conservation status
- Least Concern (IUCN 3.1)

Scientific classification
- Kingdom: Animalia
- Phylum: Chordata
- Class: Amphibia
- Order: Anura
- Family: Hylidae
- Genus: Nyctimystes
- Species: N. granti

Binomial name
- Nyctimystes granti (Boulenger, 1914)

= Grant's big-eyed tree frog =

Species of amphibian

Grant's big-eyed tree frog (Nyctimystes granti) is a species of frog in the subfamily Pelodryadinae found in New Guinea. Its natural habitats are subtropical or tropical moist lowland forests and rivers.
