= Nyctimystes kubori =

Conservation status
- Least Concern (IUCN 3.1)

Scientific classification
- Kingdom: Animalia
- Phylum: Chordata
- Class: Amphibia
- Order: Anura
- Family: Hylidae
- Genus: Nyctimystes
- Species: N. kubori

Binomial name
- Nyctimystes kubori Zweifel, 1958

Synonyms
- Litoria kubori (Zweifel, 1958)

Species of amphibian

Nyctimystes kubori is a species of frog in the subfamily Pelodryadinae of the family Hylidae. It is endemic to Papua New Guinea and is widespread in the New Guinea Highlands between 141°E and 147°E and in the mountains of the Huon Peninsula. The specific name kubori refers to its type locality in the Kubor Mountains. Common name sandy big-eyed treefrog has been coined for this species.

== Description ==
Three adult females in the type series measure 56–59 mm (2.2–2.3 in) in snout–vent length. Males can reach 53 mm (2.1 in) in snout–vent length. The snout is relatively short and blunt. The tympanum is distinct; supratympanic fold is present. The outer fingers are one-half webbed, whereas the toes are almost fully webbed. Skin is dorsally minutely roughened but ventrally coarsely granular. Dorsal coloration ranges from light yellowish brown to gray and dark brown, with light darker gray or brown spotting or heavy mottling. The inner three toes and the associated webbing can be brightly colored with orange, or sometimes a peach tinge.

== Habitat and conservation ==
Nyctimystes kubori occurs in along both larger streams in tropical rainforest at elevations of 1,000–2,000 m (3,300–6,600 ft) above sea level. Breeding probably occurs in torrential streams where the tadpoles develop.

Nyctimystes kubori can be locally common. It can occur along both open and forested streams and tolerates human habitat disturbance. There are no significant threats to this species.

In the Upper Kaironk Valley of Madang Province, Papua New Guinea, it is found in water and in Cordyline, Ficus dammaropsis, Homalanthus, Piperaceae, and other shrubs.
