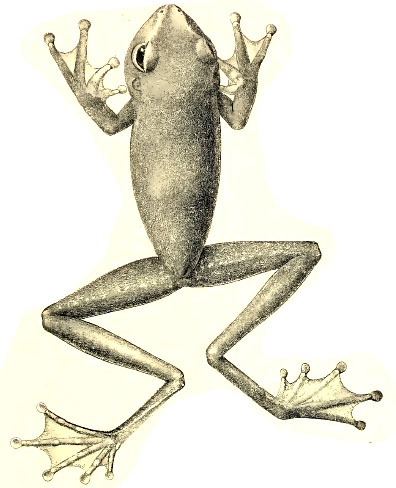
- Holotype of Nyctimystes montanus. Illustration from the original species description by Wilhelm Peters and Giacomo Doria (1878).

Scientific classification
- Kingdom: Animalia
- Phylum: Chordata
- Class: Amphibia
- Order: Anura
- Family: Pelodryadidae
- Subfamily: Pelodryadinae
- Genus: Nyctimystes; Stejneger, 1916

Species
- See text

= Nyctimystes =

Genus of amphibians

Nyctimystes is a genus of tree frogs in the family Pelodryadidae, native to Papuan, surrounding islands and the Moluccas. All species in this genus have one distinct feature that separates them from other species in the family, the lower eyelid is marked with pattern of lines, veins, or dots (except the Australian lace-lid, which is in a different genus). This feature presumably acts as camouflage when the frogs are at rest during the day.

Species of this genus inhabit tropical or subtropical montane rainforest. The eggs are large and are laid on submerged objects in fast-flowing creeks and streams (not all species of this genus have been recorded as doing this, although it is assumed). The tadpoles have large sucker-mouths and their body shapes are very streamlined with large tail musculatures. All species of this genus have extensive webbing and large toe discs.

== Species ==
The genus Nyctimystes has previously contained more species, but was split into multiple genera after a comprehensive phylogenetic study in 2025. The Australian lace-lid was historically considered a species of Nyctimystes due to similar morphology, especially the lace on their eye lids, but this same study estimated that they in fact diverged approximately 30 million years ago.

- Nyctimystes avocalis Zweifel, 1958 – Loud big-eyed tree frog
- Nyctimystes bivocalis Kraus, 2012
- Nyctimystes calcaratus Menzies, 2014
- Nyctimystes cheesmani Tyler, 1964 – Cheesman's big-eyed tree frog
- Nyctimystes cryptochrysos Kraus, 2012
- Nyctimystes daymani Zweifel, 1958 – Dayman big-eyed tree frog
- Nyctimystes disruptus Tyler, 1963 – Madang big-eyed tree frog
- Nyctimystes eucavatus Menzies, 2014
- Nyctimystes fluviatilis Zweifel, 1958 – Indonesian big-eyed tree frog
- Nyctimystes foricula Tyler, 1963 – Kaironk big-eyed tree frog
- Nyctimystes granti (Boulenger, 1914) – Grant's big-eyed tree frog
- Nyctimystes gularis Parker, 1936 – Mondo big-eyed tree frog
- Nyctimystes humeralis (Boulenger, 1912) – Green big-eyed tree frog
- Nyctimystes intercastellus Kraus, 2012
- Nyctimystes kubori Zweifel, 1958 – Sandy big-eyed tree frog
- Nyctimystes kuduki Richards, 2007
- Nyctimystes latratus Menzies, 2014
- Nyctimystes montanus (Peters et Doria, 1878) – Mountain big-eyed tree frog
- Nyctimystes myolae Menzies, 2014
- Nyctimystes narinosus Zweifel, 1958 – Common big-eyed tree frog
- Nyctimystes obsoletus (Lönnberg, 1900) – Simbang big-eyed tree frog
- Nyctimystes ocreptus Menzies, 2014
- Nyctimystes papua (Boulenger, 1897) – Papua big-eyed tree frog
- Nyctimystes perimetri Zweifel, 1958 – Archipelago big-eyed tree frog
- Nyctimystes persimilis (Zweifel, 1958) – Milne big-eyed tree frog
- Nyctimystes pulcher (Wandolleck, 1911) – Spurred big-eyed tree frog
- Nyctimystes semipalmatus Parker, 1936 – Kokoda big-eyed tree frog
- Nyctimystes trachydermis Zweifel, 1983 – Morobe big-eyed tree frog
- Nyctimystes traunae Menzies, 2014
- Nyctimystes tyleri Zweifel, 1983 – Tyler's big-eyed tree frog
- Nyctimystes zweifeli Tyler, 1967 – Zweifel's big-eyed tree frog
