= Nyctimystes intercastellus =

Scientific classification
- Kingdom: Animalia
- Phylum: Chordata
- Class: Amphibia
- Order: Anura
- Family: Pelodryadidae
- Genus: Nyctimystes
- Species: N. intercastellus

Binomial name
- Nyctimystes intercastellus Kraus, 2012

Synonyms
- Litoria intercastella (Kraus, 2012)

Species of frog

Nyctimystes intercastellus is a species of tree frog in the sub-family Pelodryadinae, endemic to Papua New Guinea. It has been found on three of the D'Entrecasteaux Islands: Fergusson Island, Normanby Island, and Goodenough Island.

This frog measures 3.9 to 5.1 cm in snout-vent length. It has more webbing on its feet than is typical for tree frogs.
