= Nyctimystes traunae =

Conservation status
- Least Concern (IUCN 3.1)

Scientific classification
- Kingdom: Animalia
- Phylum: Chordata
- Class: Amphibia
- Order: Anura
- Family: Pelodryadidae
- Genus: Nyctimystes
- Species: N. traunae

Binomial name
- Nyctimystes traunae Menzies, 2014

Species of frog

Nyctimystes traunae is a species of tree frog in the subfamily Pelodryadinae, endemic to Papua New Guinea. It lives on mountains in the centre of the island in the Western Highlands Province. Scientists have seen it about 800 meters above sea level.

== Original description ==
- Menzies, James I. (2014). "Notes on Nyctimystes (Anura: Hylidae), tree frogs of New Guinea, with descriptions of four new species". Alytes (Abstract). 30: 42–68.
