= Nyctimystes latratus =

Conservation status
- Least Concern (IUCN 3.1)

Scientific classification
- Kingdom: Animalia
- Phylum: Chordata
- Class: Amphibia
- Order: Anura
- Family: Pelodryadidae
- Genus: Nyctimystes
- Species: N. latratus

Binomial name
- Nyctimystes latratus Menzies, 2014

Species of frog

Nyctimystes latratus is a species of tree frog in the subfamily Pelodryadinae endemic to Papua New Guinea. Scientists have seen it between 500 and 1200 meters above sea level on Mount Dayman and near the Bai-u River.

This frog's eyes are gold in color. The skin of the dorsum is light brown or dark brown, and the skin of the ventrum is dull white.

The name of this frog is from the Latin word latros for "to bark."
