= Nyctimystes fluviatilis =

Conservation status
- Least Concern (IUCN 3.1)

Scientific classification
- Kingdom: Animalia
- Phylum: Chordata
- Class: Amphibia
- Order: Anura
- Family: Hylidae
- Genus: Nyctimystes
- Species: N. fluviatilis

Binomial name
- Nyctimystes fluviatilis Zweifel, 1958

Synonyms
- Litoria fluviatilis (Zweifel, 1958)

Species of amphibian

Nyctimystes fluviatilis, also known as the Indonesian big-eyed tree frog, is a species of frog in the subfamily Pelodryadinae of the family Hylidae. It is endemic to New Guinea and is known from Idenburg River (its type locality) and Wapoga River in Papua province, Indonesia, and from the Torricelli Mountains in the East Sepik Province and Kavorabip in the Western Province, both in the western Papua New Guinea.

== Description ==
The holotype, an adult female, measures 50 mm (2.0 in) in snout–vent length. The snout is relatively flat and dorsoventrally compressed. The tympanum is visible; the supratympanic fold is weakly developed. The canthus rostralis is distinct. The outer fingers are about half-webbed, whereas the outer toes are webbed to the base of the discs. The preserved specimen is dorsally light brown with small (1–2 mm) scattered spots. The legs have some irregular crossbars. The lower surfaces are pale tan.

== Habitat and conservation ==
Nyctimystes fluviatilis occurs in streams in tropical rainforests at elevations below 600 m (2,000 ft) above sea level. Breeding probably occurs in torrential streams where the tadpoles develop.

The collection from the Torricelli mountains contains several specimens, whereas only two specimens are known from the Indonesian part of the range. The threats to this species are unknown.
