= Nyctimystes eucavatus =

Conservation status
- Data Deficient (IUCN 3.1)

Scientific classification
- Kingdom: Animalia
- Phylum: Chordata
- Class: Amphibia
- Order: Anura
- Family: Pelodryadidae
- Genus: Nyctimystes
- Species: N. eucavatus

Binomial name
- Nyctimystes eucavatus (Menzies, 2014)

Species of amphibian

Nyctimystes eucavatus is a species of tree frog in the family Hylidae. It is endemic to eastern Papua New Guinea. Scientists have observed it between 800 and 1200 meters above sea level in the eastern mountains.

This frog's eggs are about 2.2 mm in diameter.
