= Nyctimystes foricula =

Conservation status
- Least Concern (IUCN 3.1)

Scientific classification
- Kingdom: Animalia
- Phylum: Chordata
- Class: Amphibia
- Order: Anura
- Family: Pelodryadidae
- Genus: Nyctimystes
- Species: N. foricula

Binomial name
- Nyctimystes foricula Tyler, 1963

Species of amphibian

Nyctimystes foricula, the Kaironk big-eyed tree frog, is a species of frog in the subfamily Pelodryadinae, endemic to Papua New Guinea. Its natural habitats are subtropical or tropical moist montane forests, rivers, rural gardens, and heavily degraded former forests.

== Habitat ==
In the Upper Kaironk Valley of Madang Province, Papua New Guinea, it is found in water and rock clefts, and among Miscanthus cane, Ficus dammaropsis, Homalanthus, and other trees and foliage near water.
