= Nyctimystes cryptochrysos =

Conservation status
- Least Concern (IUCN 3.1)

Scientific classification
- Kingdom: Animalia
- Phylum: Chordata
- Class: Amphibia
- Order: Anura
- Family: Pelodryadidae
- Genus: Nyctimystes
- Species: N. cryptochrysos

Binomial name
- Nyctimystes cryptochrysos Kraus, 2012

Synonyms
- Litoria cryptochrysos (Kraus, 2012)

Species of frog

Nyctimystes cryptochrysos is a species of tree frog in the subfamily Pelodryadinae, endemic to Papua New Guinea. It lives on Fergusson Island between 900 and 1500 meters above sea level. Scientists suspect it may also live in the D'Entrecasteaux Islands.

The adult male frog measures 48.2 to 50.6 mm in snout-vent length and the adult female frog 60.7 to 65.1 mm. Most of the skin of the dorsum is a mixture of light brown and dark brown in color. This frog has vertical lines on its lower eyelids and gold coloring on its legs and groin.

The scientific name of this species, chryptochrysos, comes from the Greek kryptos for "hidden" and chrysos for "gold," referring to the gold color on the middle of this frog's body.
