= Nyctimystes humeralis =

Conservation status
- Least Concern (IUCN 3.1)

Scientific classification
- Kingdom: Animalia
- Phylum: Chordata
- Class: Amphibia
- Order: Anura
- Family: Hylidae
- Genus: Nyctimystes
- Species: N. humeralis

Binomial name
- Nyctimystes humeralis (Boulenger, 1912)

Species of amphibian

Nyctimystes humeralis, also known as green big-eyed tree frog, is a species of frog in the subfamily Pelodryadinae that is found in New Guinea. Its natural habitats are subtropical or tropical moist lowland forests, subtropical or tropical moist montane forests, and rivers.
