= Nyctimystes avocalis =

Conservation status
- Least Concern (IUCN 3.1)

Scientific classification
- Kingdom: Animalia
- Phylum: Chordata
- Class: Amphibia
- Order: Anura
- Family: Hylidae
- Genus: Nyctimystes
- Species: N. avocalis

Binomial name
- Nyctimystes avocalis Zweifel, 1958

Synonyms
- Litoria avocalis (Zweifel, 1958)

Species of amphibian

Nyctimystes avocalis is a species of frog in the subfamily Pelodryadinae. It is endemic to Papua New Guinea and is only known from its type locality on the east slope of Goodenough Island, one of the D'Entrecasteaux Islands. It has been given the common name loud big-eyed treefrog.

== Description ==
The type series consists of three males and two females. The males measure 33–35 mm (1.3–1.4 in) and the larger female 47 mm (1.9 in) in snout–vent length. The canthus rostralis is distinct as is the tympanum, although the upper margin of the latter is concealed by the supratympanic fold. The outer fingers are half-webbed. The hind limbs are relatively long and the toes are almost fully webbed. Skin is dorsally mildly granular and ventrally (including the throat) coarsely granular. The dorsal ground color is usually gray and there are lichen-like patches of tan on the body and the back of the head. One specimen, however, is brown without obvious markings. The tibia are irregularly banded. Males lack vocal sac and vocal-sac openings, which is unusual within the genus Nyctimystes.

== Habitat and conservation ==
The type series was collected near a small creek in oak-rain-forest transition at about 900 m (3,000 ft) above sea level. Breeding probably occurs in torrential streams where the tadpoles develop.

The lower altitudes of Goodenough Island (below 300 m (980 ft)) are heavily impacted by gardening and fires, as well as expanding human population, but as of 2004, higher altitudes were intact. Nyctimystes avocalis is not known from any protected areas.
