= Nyctimystes semipalmatus =

Conservation status
- Least Concern (IUCN 3.1)

Scientific classification
- Kingdom: Animalia
- Phylum: Chordata
- Class: Amphibia
- Order: Anura
- Family: Pelodryadidae
- Genus: Nyctimystes
- Species: N. semipalmatus

Binomial name
- Nyctimystes semipalmatus Parker, 1936

Species of amphibian

Nyctimystes semipalmatus, the Kokoda big-eyed tree frog, is a species of frog in the subfamily Pelodryadinae, endemic to Papua New Guinea. Its natural habitats are subtropical or tropical moist lowland forests, rivers, and heavily degraded former forests.
