= Nyctimystes bivocalis =

Conservation status
- Least Concern (IUCN 3.1)

Scientific classification
- Kingdom: Animalia
- Phylum: Chordata
- Class: Amphibia
- Order: Anura
- Family: Pelodryadidae
- Genus: Nyctimystes
- Species: N. bivocalis

Binomial name
- Nyctimystes bivocalis Kraus, 2012

Synonyms
- Litoria bivocalis (Kraus, 2012)

Species of amphibian

Nyctimystes bivocalis is a species of frog in the subfamily Pelodryadinae, endemic to New Guinea. It has been observed in the Cloudy Mountains and part of the Owen Stanley Mountains in Milne Bay Province. The adult male frog measures 38.5 to 49.2 mm long in snout-vent length and it is gray-brown in color. The adult female measures 42.2 to 55.7 mm long and is orange-brown in color.

The name bivocalis or double-voice comes from the two levels of pitch in the frog's call.
