= Nyctimystes perimetri =

Conservation status
- Least Concern (IUCN 3.1)

Scientific classification
- Kingdom: Animalia
- Phylum: Chordata
- Class: Amphibia
- Order: Anura
- Family: Hylidae
- Genus: Nyctimystes
- Species: N. perimetri

Binomial name
- Nyctimystes perimetri Zweifel, 1958

Synonyms
- Litoria perimetri (Zweifel, 1958)

Species of amphibian

Nyctimystes perimetri, also known as the archipelago big-eyed treefrog, is a species of frog in the subfamily Pelodryadinae of the family Hylidae. It is endemic to Papua New Guinea and currently only known from the Louisiade Archipelago (Tagula and Rossel Islands), although it might also occur in the Owen Stanley Range of the mainland Papua New Guinea. It has also been suggested that the Rossel Island population might represent a distinct species.

== Description ==
Adult males measure 48–52 mm (1.9–2.0 in) and adult females, based on a single specimen, about 67 mm (2.6 in) in snout–vent length. The tympanum is small but distinct; supratympanic fold is present. The canthus rostralis is distinct. The palpebral venation consists of oblique to near-vertical lines, with only few horizontal interconnections. The outer fingers are about half-webbed, whereas the toes are webbed to the base of the discs or slight less. Skin is minutely granular dorsally and coarsely granular ventrally. Preserved specimens are lead-colored dorsally, almost without any pattern. However, the limbs have some indistinct spotting and banding. The chest and the abdomen are unpigmented, or with some yellow pigment in the chest and the throat.

== Habitat and conservation ==
Nyctimystes perimetri occurs along small (about 1–2 m wide) tributary streams of large, forested lowland streams at elevations of 150–350 m (490–1,150 ft) above sea level. Breeding probably occurs in streams where the tadpoles develop. It is a common species in suitable habitat. There are no known threats to this species; habitat on Tegula and Rossel remains in reasonable condition, despite logging in the past.
