= Nyctimystes tyleri =

Conservation status
- Data Deficient (IUCN 3.1)

Scientific classification
- Kingdom: Animalia
- Phylum: Chordata
- Class: Amphibia
- Order: Anura
- Family: Hylidae
- Genus: Nyctimystes
- Species: N. tyleri

Binomial name
- Nyctimystes tyleri Zweifel, 1983

Synonyms
- Litoria michaeltyleri Frost et al., 2006

Species of amphibian

Nyctimystes tyleri is a species of frog in the subfamily Pelodryadinae of the family Hylidae. It is endemic to Papua New Guinea and only known from its type locality, Gapaia Creek, between Garaina and Saureli, in the Morobe Province. The specific name honours Michael J. Tyler, an Australian herpetologist, "in recognition of his notable contributions to the systematics of Australo-papuan frogs." Common name Tyler's big-eyed treefrog has been coined for this species.

== Description ==
The holotype, an adult male, measures 78 mm (3.1 in) in snout–vent length. All dorsal surfaces, apart from the top of thigh, are very warty. Dorsal ground colour is dark green. There are somewhat inconspicuous, large, dark brown blotches on the back. Ventral surfaces are grey with small, dark brown spots on the chin, chest, and abdomen. Legs have larger spots of the same colour. Iris is golden. Tympanum is small and indistinct. Vocal sac is absent.

== Habitat and conservation ==
The type specimen—the only known specimen—was encountered at night sitting on a tree branch about 10 metres from a torrential mountain stream in rainforest at an elevation of 1,280 m (4,200 ft) above sea level. The locality has an unusually high diversity of stream-associated hylid frogs and is also the type locality for Nyctimystes trachydermis. The locality is remote and probably safe from most threats.
