= Nyctimystes obsoletus =

Conservation status
- Data Deficient (IUCN 3.1)

Scientific classification
- Kingdom: Animalia
- Phylum: Chordata
- Class: Amphibia
- Order: Anura
- Family: Hylidae
- Genus: Nyctimystes
- Species: N. obsoletus

Binomial name
- Nyctimystes obsoletus (Lönnberg, 1900)

Species of amphibian

Nyctimystes obsoletus, the Simbang big-eyed tree frog, is a species of frog in the subfamily Pelodryadinae, endemic to Papua New Guinea. Its natural habitats are subtropical or tropical moist lowland forests and rivers.
