= Nyctimystes cheesmani =

Conservation status
- Least Concern (IUCN 3.1)

Scientific classification
- Kingdom: Animalia
- Phylum: Chordata
- Class: Amphibia
- Order: Anura
- Family: Pelodryadidae
- Genus: Nyctimystes
- Species: N. cheesmani

Binomial name
- Nyctimystes cheesmani Tyler, 1964

Species of amphibian

Nyctimystes cheesmani, commonly known as Cheesman's big-eyed treefrog, is a species of frog in the subfamily Pelodryadinae, endemic to Papua New Guinea. Its natural habitats are subtropical or tropical moist lowland forests, subtropical or tropical moist montane forests, and rivers.
