= Nyctimystes gularis =

Conservation status
- Least Concern (IUCN 3.1)

Scientific classification
- Kingdom: Animalia
- Phylum: Chordata
- Class: Amphibia
- Order: Anura
- Family: Pelodryadidae
- Genus: Nyctimystes
- Species: N. gularis

Binomial name
- Nyctimystes gularis Parker, 1936

Species of amphibian

Nyctimystes gularis, the Mondo big-eyed tree frog, is a species of frog in the subfamily Pelodryadinae, endemic to Papua New Guinea. Its natural habitats are subtropical or tropical moist montane forests and rivers.

Scientists have seen it on Mount Daman and Mount Tafa, between 1500 and 2400 meters above sea level (5000 and 7900 feet).

The male is about 3.7 cm long and the female is between 4.2 and 5.6 cm long. Scientists who have seen the frog said it was a solid color with a darker color on its legs.
