= Nyctimystes zweifeli =

Conservation status
- Least Concern (IUCN 3.1)

Scientific classification
- Kingdom: Animalia
- Phylum: Chordata
- Class: Amphibia
- Order: Anura
- Family: Pelodryadidae
- Genus: Nyctimystes
- Species: N. zweifeli

Binomial name
- Nyctimystes zweifeli Tyler, 1967

Species of amphibian

Nyctimystes zweifeli, or Zweifel's big-eyed tree frog, is a species of frog in the subfamily Pelodryadinae endemic to Papua New Guinea. Its natural habitats are subtropical or tropical moist montane forests and rivers.
