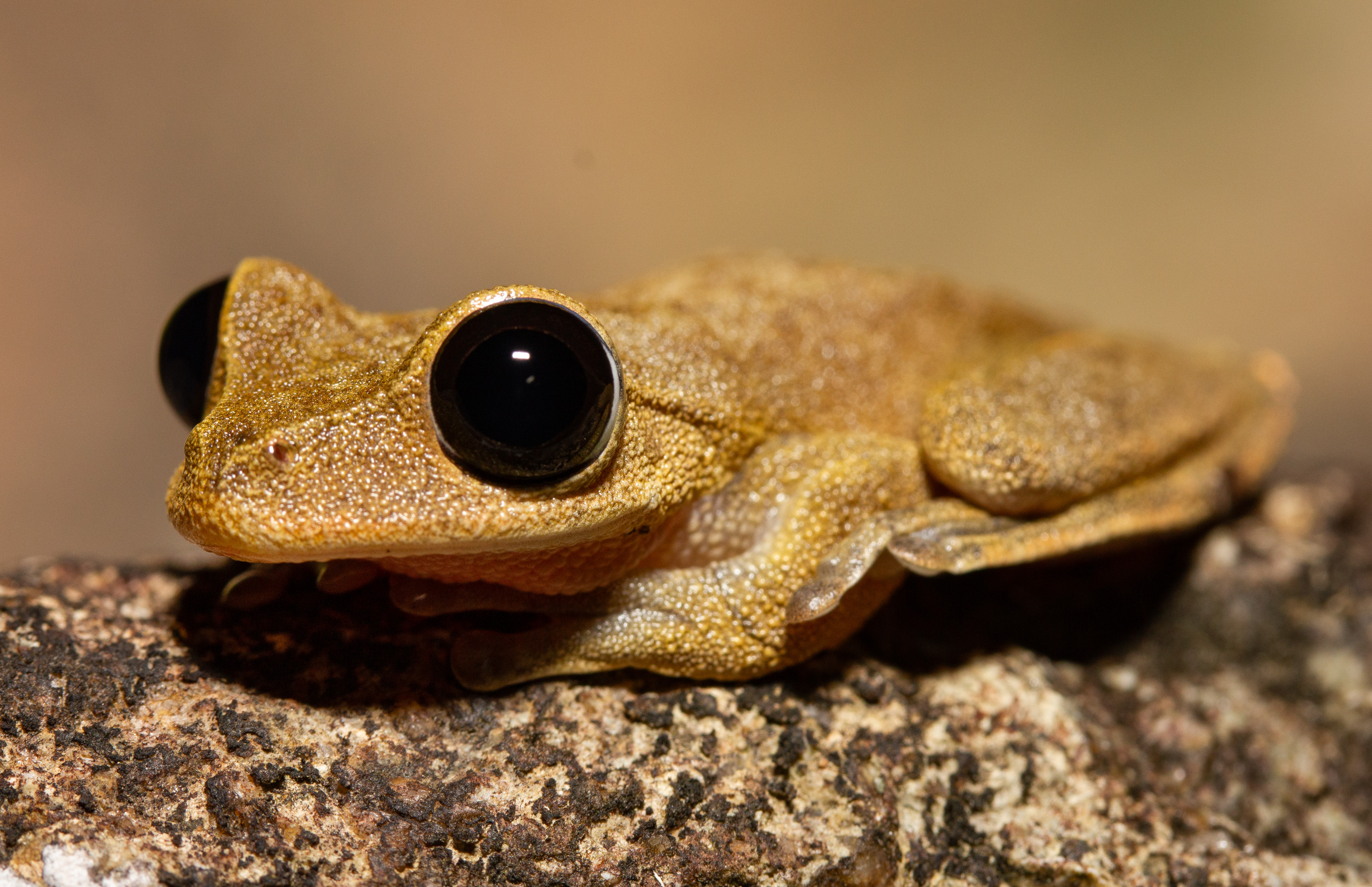
- Australian lace-lid from Paluma, Queensland

Conservation status
- Vulnerable (EPBC Act)

- Endangered (IUCN 3.1)

Scientific classification
- Kingdom: Animalia
- Phylum: Chordata
- Class: Amphibia
- Order: Anura
- Family: Pelodryadidae
- Genus: Eremnoculus
- Species: E. dayi

Binomial name
- Eremnoculus dayi (Günther, 1897)
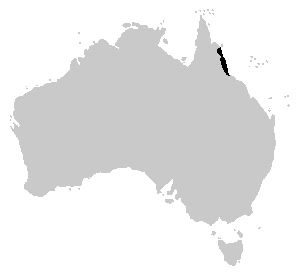
- The range of Eremnoculus dayi.

Synonyms
- Nyctimystes dayi (Günther, 1897)

= Australian lace-lid =

Species of amphibian

The Australian lace-lid (Eremnoculus dayi), also known as lace-eyed tree frog and Day's big-eyed treefrog, is a species of tree frog in the family Pelodryadidae. It is endemic to the wet tropics of north-eastern Queensland, Australia.

== Description ==
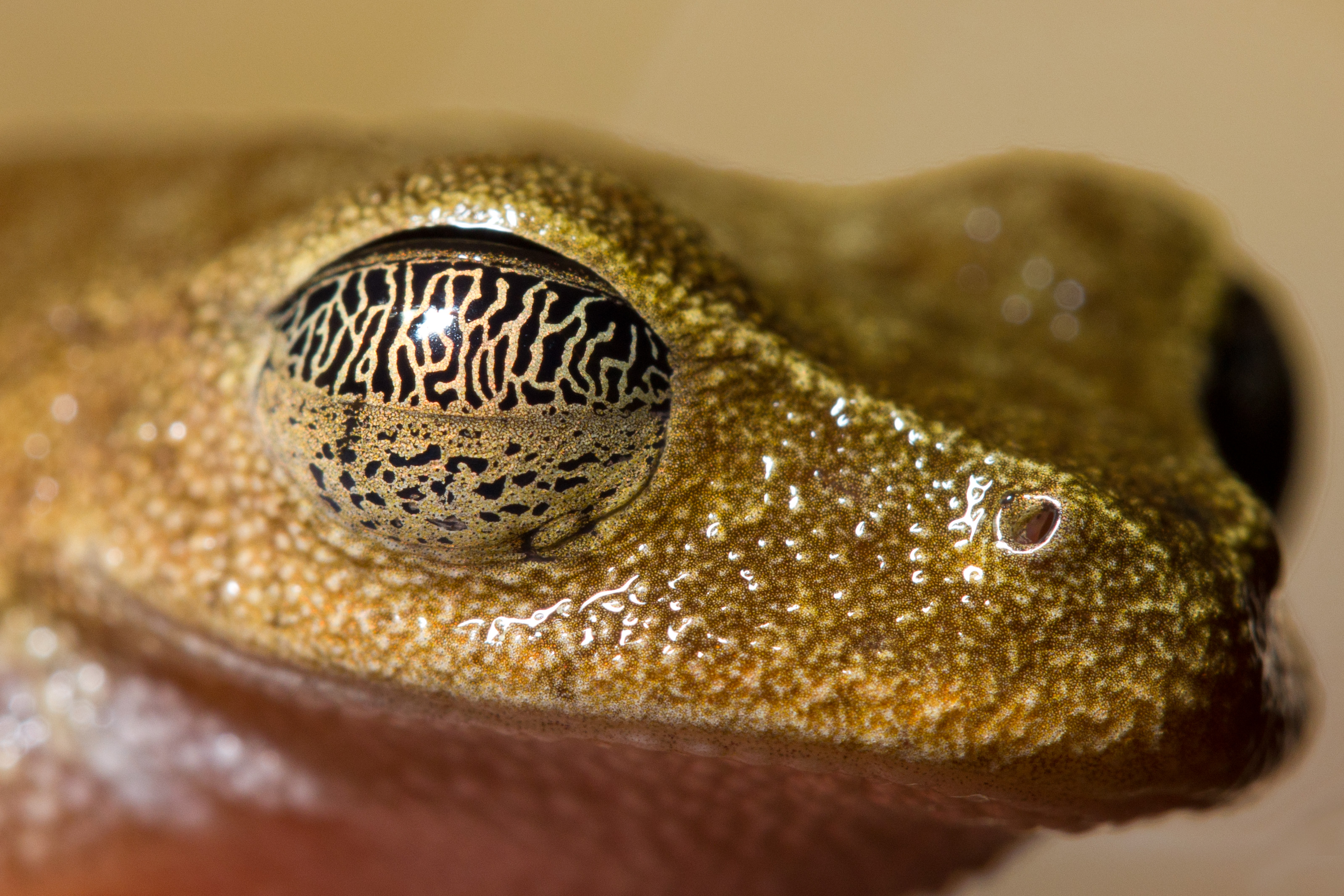
Laced lid that distinguishes this species from all other Australian frogs.

This is a small to medium-sized frog growing up to 50 mm (2.0 in) in length. The dorsal surface is rich-brown to orange-brown with or without scattered cream or lichen-like spots and blotches covering it, the head or the limbs. The arms and legs have faint barring and a slight fringe along the outer edges. The belly is cream-white and granular, with the throat and under surface of the arms and legs being black. The iris is dark brown and the pupil is vertical when constricted. The lower eyelid is patterned with lines, veins, and dots which give the frog its name. Toes are fully webbed and fingers are almost completely webbed. The tympanum is distinct with the upper quarter cover under a skin fold.

Common names for R. dayi include Australian lace-lid, lace-eyed tree frog, and Day's big-eyed treefrog.

== Ecology and behaviour ==
This species ranges from Paluma to Cooktown in northern Queensland. It is associated with fast-flowing creeks in montane rainforests of altitudes ranging from 0–1,200 m (0–3,937 ft). But can also be found around slower watercourses and rock soaks when ample vegetation is present. They breed from spring to summer with peak breeding occurring from October to April. Males call while on low foliage or rocks close to the stream, and have has two distinct calls. A drawn-out "eeeeeeee" repeated three or four times in concession is made when calling in a group and when calling alone a short "ee" is made every 4–5 seconds. Eggs are large and unpigmented and are laid in clumps of up to 100 attached to submerged objects.

== Similar species ==
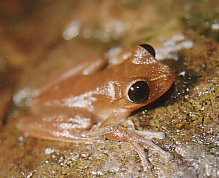

It may be confused with the fringed tree frog, which is readily distinguished by the vertical pupil and the lower eyelid patterning.

== Conservation status ==
As of August 2023 the Australian lace-lid is listed as an endangered species under the IUCN Red List and as vulnerable under the Commonwealth EPBC Act and Queensland's Nature Conservation (Animals) Regulation 2020.

A study published in Biological Conservation in March 2023 listed 23 species which the authors considered to no longer meet the criteria as threatened species under the EPBC Act, including the Australian lace-lid. The reason for their assessment was given as "Populations now stable or increasing, following previous rapid and severe decline". The team, led by John Woinarski of Charles Darwin University looked at all species listed as threatened under the act in 2000 and 2022,
