= Exedrobatrachus biakensis =

Scientific classification
- Kingdom: Animalia
- Phylum: Chordata
- Class: Amphibia
- Order: Anura
- Family: Pelodryadidae
- Genus: Exedrobatrachus
- Species: E. biakensis

Binomial name
- Exedrobatrachus biakensis (Günther, 2006)

Species of amphibian

Exedrobatrachus biakensis is a monotypic species of frog in the family Pelodryadidae. It is endemic to Biak Island 120 km off the north-western coast of New Guinea, Indonesia, where it has been found in two locations.

A comprehensive study of Pelodryadidae found that its isolation on Biak has led to Exedrobatrachus being phylogenetically isolated from any closely related species. This led to its name Exedrobatrachus, which comes from the Greek for "away from home frog". This is in reference to both its phylogenetic isolation, and its isolation on Biak Island.
