= Nyctimystes persimilis =

Conservation status
- Least Concern (IUCN 3.1)

Scientific classification
- Kingdom: Animalia
- Phylum: Chordata
- Class: Amphibia
- Order: Anura
- Family: Hylidae
- Genus: Nyctimystes
- Species: N. persimilis

Binomial name
- Nyctimystes persimilis Zweifel, 1958

Synonyms
- Litoria persimilis (Zweifel, 1958)

Species of amphibian

Nyctimystes persimilis, also known as the Milne big-eyed treefrog, is a species of frog in the subfamily Pelodryadinae of the family Hylidae. It is endemic to Papua New Guinea and known from Mount Dayman and Mount Simpson in the Owen Stanley Range.

== Description ==
The type series consists of two adult males measuring 37 and 40 mm (1.5 and 1.6 in) in snout–vent length; the maximum male length in a larger material is 50 mm (2.0 in). The head is relatively broad and the snout short. The tympanum is distinct; supratympanic fold is present. The canthus rostralis is slightly curved. The palpebral venation consists of largely oblique lines, with only few horizontal interconnections, or are partly networked. The fingers are lightly webbed (basal webbing on the outer fingers), whereas the toes are more webbed, but without the webbing reaching the base of the discs. Skin is slightly roughened to rugose dorsally and coarsely granulated ventrally. Colouration of living specimens is variable but usually they are light golden brown with green or brown blotches, or plain or greyish olive with bold dark spots, or entirely darker brown. The flanks are dark with white speckling.

== Habitat and conservation ==
Nyctimystes persimilis occurs along small (about 2–5 m wide) streams at elevations of 1,300–1,500 m (4,300–4,900 ft) above sea level in both primary forest and villages largely devoid of trees. Breeding probably occurs in streams where the tadpoles develop. On Mount Simpson, it is a common species in suitable habitat. There are no known major threats to this species; it appears to tolerate the degree of habitat degradation that is typically present in its range.
