= Nyctimystes trachydermis =

Conservation status
- Least Concern (IUCN 3.1)

Scientific classification
- Kingdom: Animalia
- Phylum: Chordata
- Class: Amphibia
- Order: Anura
- Family: Hylidae
- Genus: Nyctimystes
- Species: N. trachydermis

Binomial name
- Nyctimystes trachydermis Zweifel, 1983

Synonyms
- Litoria trachydermis (Zweifel, 1983)

Species of amphibian

Nyctimystes trachydermis, also known as the Morobe big-eyed treefrog, is a species of frog in the subfamily Pelodryadinae of the family Hylidae. It is endemic to Papua New Guinea and occurs in the mountains of southern eastern New Guinea. Its type locality (which it shares with Nyctimystes tyleri) is Gapaia Creek, at 1,280 m (4,200 ft) asl between Garaina and Saureli, in the Morobe Province. The specific name trachydermis means "rough skinned", derived from the Greek words trachys and derma.

== Description ==
Nyctimystes trachydermis are relative large frogs, with adult males measuring 72–88 mm (2.8–3.5 in) in snout–vent length. One gravid female measured 76 mm (3.0 in). Dorsal surfaces are roughed throughout with small, mostly conical and white-tipped asperities. Dorsal ground colour varies from dark greenish brown to gray. Some specimens have lighter blotches. Iris is reddish brown with distinct vertical pupil. Tympanum is completely concealed. Vocal sac is absent.

== Habitat and conservation ==
Nyctimystes trachydermis live along small streams in montane rainforests at elevations of 1,280–2,480 m (4,200–8,140 ft) above sea level. Development is presumably direct (i.e., there is no free-living larval stage), as in other species in the genus.

This species is locally common. Sedimentation of streams because of mining is a localized threat to it. It is also collected for food, although it is not known whether this is a threat at present. Its range overlaps with the Mount Kaindi Wildlife Management Area.
