= Nyctimystes papua =

Conservation status
- Least Concern (IUCN 3.1)

Scientific classification
- Kingdom: Animalia
- Phylum: Chordata
- Class: Amphibia
- Order: Anura
- Family: Hylidae
- Genus: Nyctimystes
- Species: N. papua

Binomial name
- Nyctimystes papua (Boulenger, 1897)

Species of amphibian

Nyctimystes papua, the Papua big-eyed tree frog, is a species of frog in the subfamily Pelodryadinae, endemic to Papua New Guinea. Its natural habitats are subtropical or tropical moist montane forests and rivers.
