= Nyctimystes calcaratus =

Conservation status
- Near Threatened (IUCN 3.1)

Scientific classification
- Kingdom: Animalia
- Phylum: Chordata
- Class: Amphibia
- Order: Anura
- Family: Pelodryadidae
- Genus: Nyctimystes
- Species: N. calcaratus

Binomial name
- Nyctimystes calcaratus Menzies, 2014

Species of amphibian

Nyctimystes calcaratus is a species of frog in the subfamily Pelodryadinae, endemic to New Guinea. Scientists observed it about 1230 meters above sea level near a forest stream.

The name calcaratus comes from the Latin word for spur. The frogs are named after the bump on their hind foot.

The male frog measures about 4.3 to 5.2 cm in snout-vent length and the adult female frog 5.6 to 6.3 cm. This frog has thin, angled lines on its lower eyelids and gold irises in its eyes. This frog is light brown to dark brown in color with darker marks.
