= Nyctimystes disruptus =

Conservation status
- Least Concern (IUCN 3.1)

Scientific classification
- Kingdom: Animalia
- Phylum: Chordata
- Class: Amphibia
- Order: Anura
- Family: Pelodryadidae
- Genus: Nyctimystes
- Species: N. disruptus

Binomial name
- Nyctimystes disruptus Tyler, 1963

Synonyms
- Nyctimystes oktediensis Richards & Johnston, 1993

Species of amphibian

Nyctimystes disruptus, also known the Madang big-eyed tree frog and Richard's big-eyed tree frog, is a species of frog in the subfamily Pelodryadinae, endemic to New Guinea. Its natural habitats are subtropical or tropical moist montane forests, rivers, rural gardens, and heavily degraded former forest.
