= Nyctimystes kuduki =

Conservation status
- Data Deficient (IUCN 3.1)

Scientific classification
- Kingdom: Animalia
- Phylum: Chordata
- Class: Amphibia
- Order: Anura
- Family: Pelodryadidae
- Genus: Nyctimystes
- Species: N. kuduki

Binomial name
- Nyctimystes kuduki Richards, 2007

Synonyms
- Litoria kuduki

Species of frog

Nyctimystes kuduki is a species of tree frog in the sub-family Pelodryadinae. It is endemic to Papua New Guinea and is found in montane rainforests in Southern Highlands Province.

The adult male frog measures 58.2 to 61.0 mm in snout-vent length, which is large for a frog in Nyctimystes. It has yellow or gold veins in its lower eyelids. It has very small ears for a Nyctimystes frog. It has very large, dark brown eyes. It has two groups of vomerine teeth in its upper jaw. This frog has dark brown and light brown skin. Some parts of its legs are yellow. It has a dull white belly. It has white spots on its back and eyelids.

During the mating season, the male frog perches on leaves over fast-flowing streams and sings for female frogs.

The species is named after Max Kuduk, who worked for the World Wide Fund for Nature.
