= Nyctimystes daymani =

Conservation status
- Least Concern (IUCN 3.1)

Scientific classification
- Kingdom: Animalia
- Phylum: Chordata
- Class: Amphibia
- Order: Anura
- Family: Hylidae
- Genus: Nyctimystes
- Species: N. daymani

Binomial name
- Nyctimystes daymani Zweifel, 1958
- Nyctimystes daymani is only known with certainty from Mount Dayman in the Milne Bay Province in Papua New Guinea

Synonyms
- Litoria daymani (Zweifel, 1958)

Species of amphibian

Nyctimystes daymani, also known as the Dayman big-eyed treefrog, is a species of frog in the subfamily Pelodryadinae. It is endemic to Papua New Guinea and known from its type locality, Mount Dayman in the Milne Bay Province, easternmost mainland New Guinea. Records from further west are uncertain.

== Description ==
Male Nyctimystes daymani grow to a snout–vent length of at least 42 mm (1.7 in). The snout is relatively long and narrow. The palpebral reticulum has very distinct, near-vertical veins. The tympanum is small but distinct and the supratympanic fold is strongly developed. The canthus rostralis is distinct. The outer fingers are about half-webbed, whereas the outermost toe is webbed to the base of the disc. The legs are comparatively short. Colouration is variable. Preserved specimens may be dorsally dark brown, with pale brown patches spotted with dark brown; some specimens are gray-brown and virtually patternless, while others are brown with white spots. Males have a vocal sac.

== Habitat and conservation ==
The type series was collected at the banks of a rocky stream in the forest at about 700 m (2,300 ft) above sea level. Breeding probably occurs in torrential streams where the tadpoles develop.

This species has probably not been observed after it was first described. The threats to it are unknown.
