= Vera's treefrog =

Conservation status
- Data Deficient (IUCN 3.1)

Scientific classification
- Kingdom: Animalia
- Phylum: Chordata
- Class: Amphibia
- Order: Anura
- Family: Pelodryadidae
- Genus: Lathrana
- Species: L. verae

Binomial name
- Lathrana verae (Günther, 2004)

Synonyms
- Litoria verae (Günther, 2004)

Species of amphibian

Vera's treefrog (Lathrana verae) is a species of frog in the family Pelodryadidae. It is endemic to West Papua, Indonesia. Its natural habitats are subtropical or tropical moist lowland forests, intermittent rivers, shrub-dominated wetlands, and swamps. It is threatened by habitat loss.
