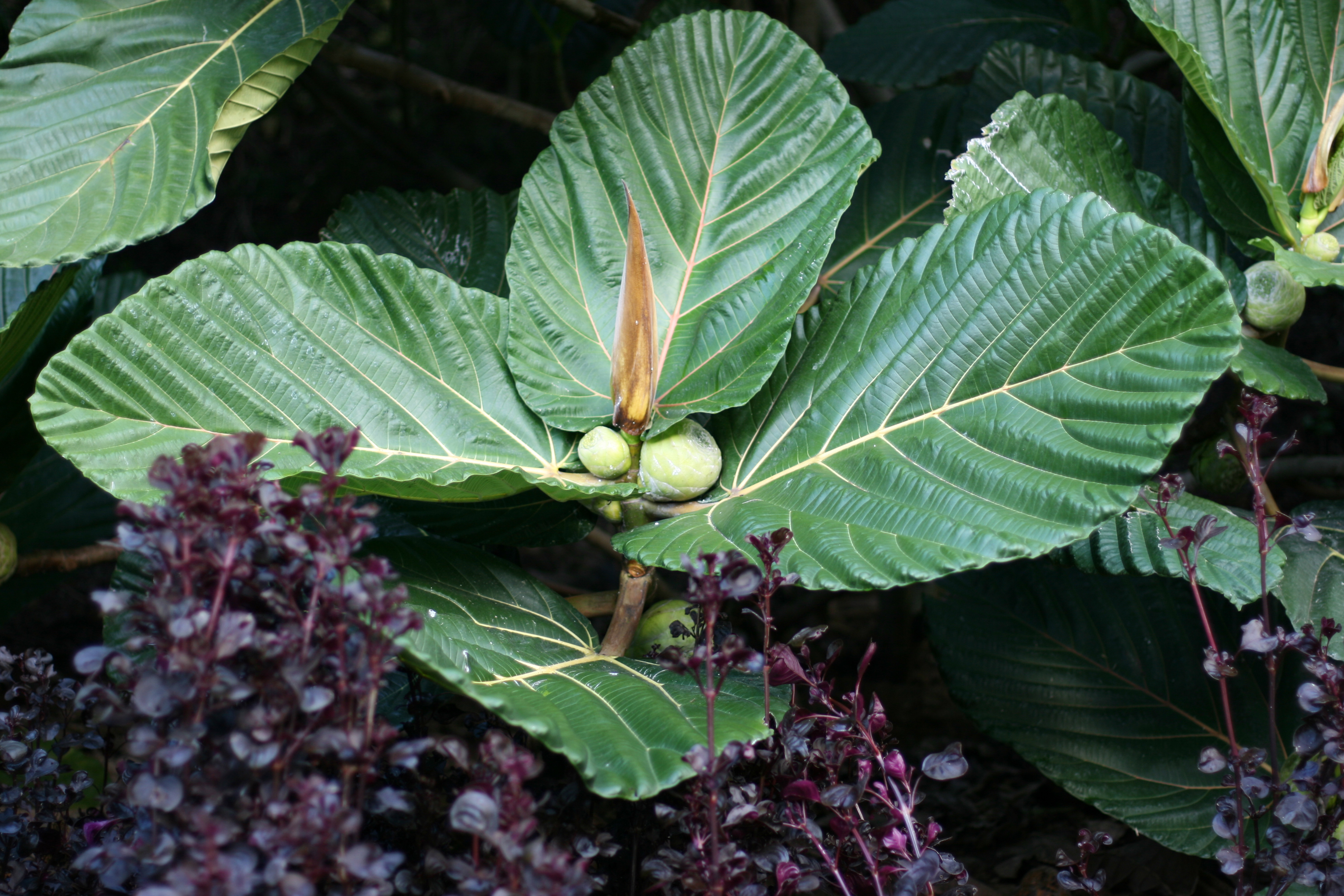
- Ficus dammaropsis showing large leaves and syconia (fruit of figs)

Conservation status
- Least Concern (IUCN 3.1)

Scientific classification
- Kingdom: Plantae
- Clade: Tracheophytes
- Clade: Angiosperms
- Clade: Eudicots
- Clade: Rosids
- Order: Rosales
- Family: Moraceae
- Genus: Ficus
- Subgenus: F. subg. Sycomorus
- Species: F. dammaropsis

Binomial name
- Ficus dammaropsis Diels

Synonyms
- Dammaropsis kingiana Warb.; Ficus dammaropsis var. obtusa Corner

= Ficus dammaropsis =

Species of tropical fig

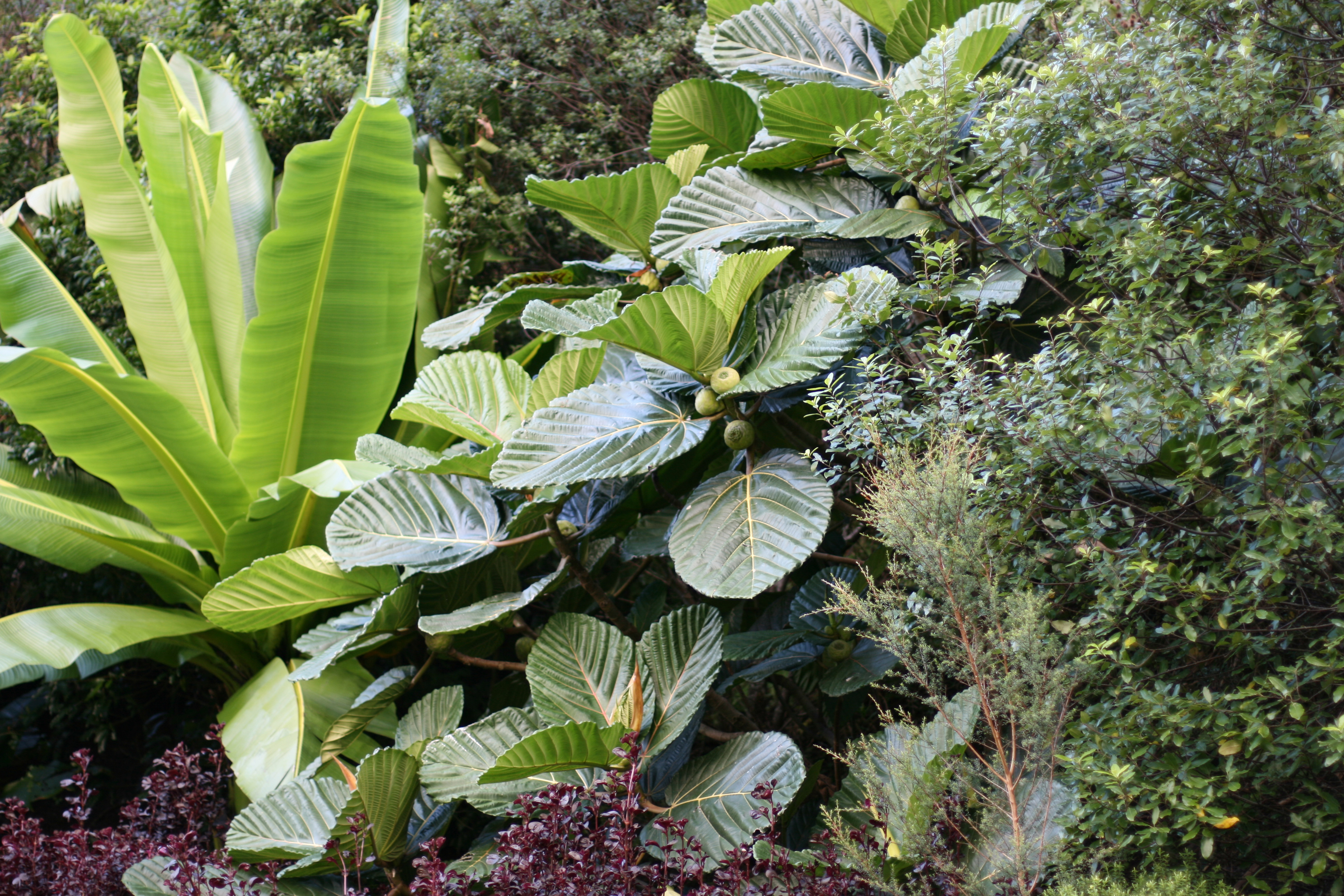
A young highland breadfruit, centre, in Whangārei, New Zealand

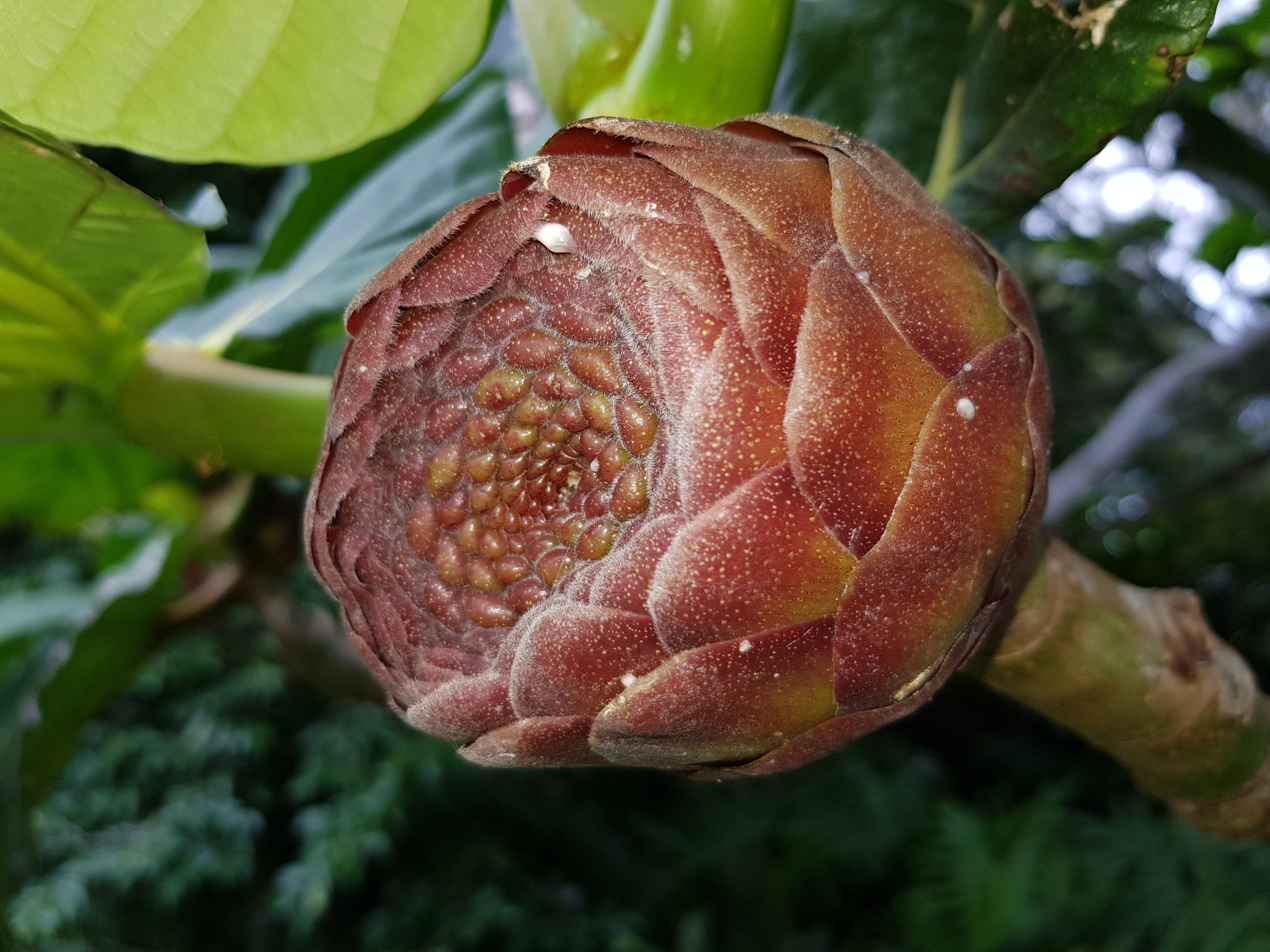
Immature fruits at Royal Botanic Gardens Victoria

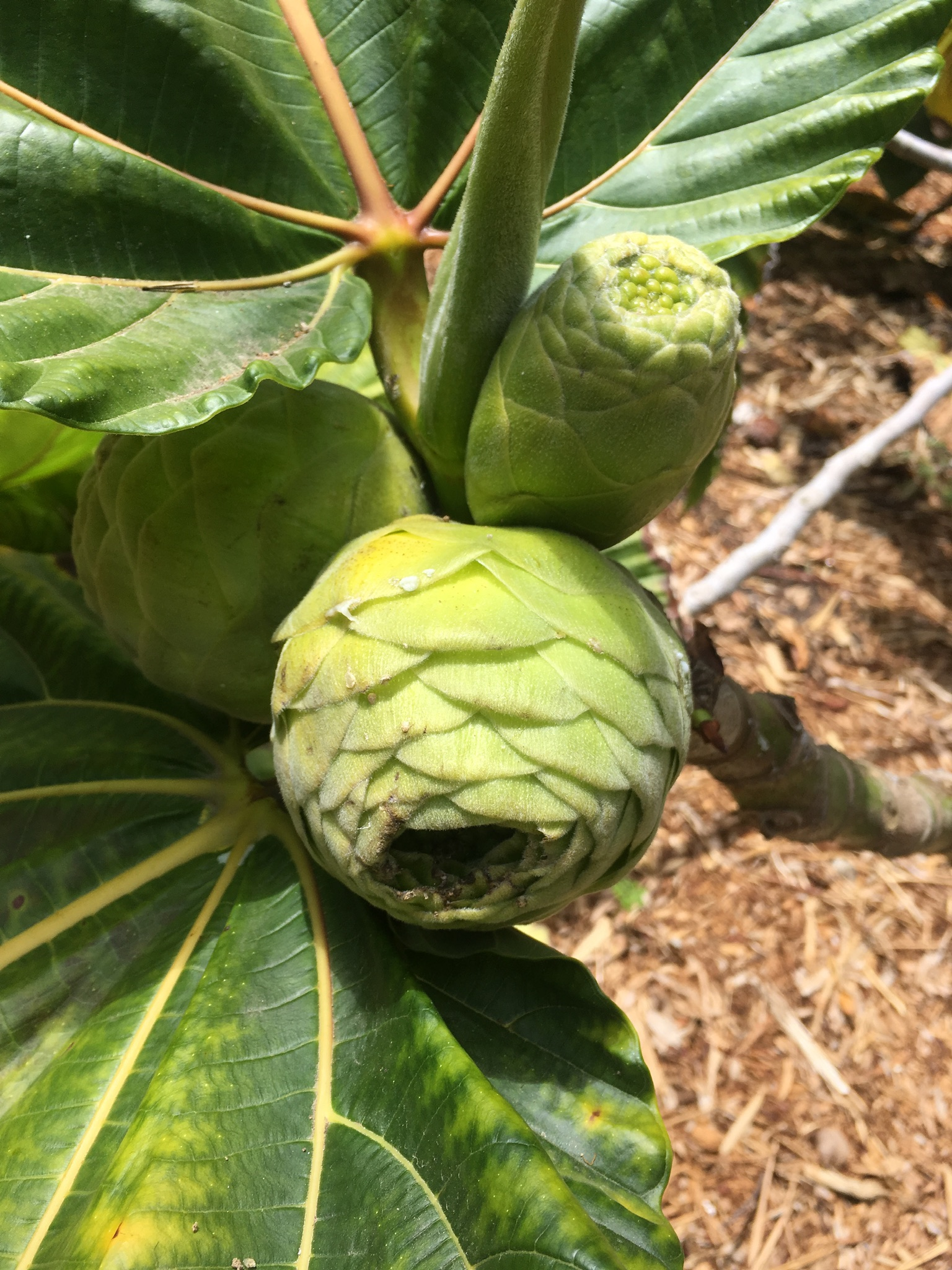
Syconia (fruit) of the plant Ficus dammaropsis

Ficus dammaropsis, the highland breadfruit, locally called kapiak in Tok Pisin, is a tropical dioecious evergreen fig (subgenus Sycamorus), of the family Moraceae, with huge pleated leaves 60 cm (24 in) across and up to 90 cm (3 ft) in length. on petioles as much as 32 cm (13 in) long and 2.5 cm (0.98 in) thick. These emerge from a stipular sheath up to 38 cm (15 in) long, the largest of any dicot. It is native to the highlands and highland fringe of New Guinea. It generally grows at elevations of between 850 and 2,750 metres (2,790 and 9,020 ft). Its fruit, the world's largest fig (syconium), up to 18 cm (7 in) in diameter are edible but rarely eaten except as an emergency food. There are two fruit colour variants in Ficus dammaropsis, red and green. They are pollinated by the tiny fig wasp Ceratosolen abnormis. The young leaves are pickled or cooked and eaten as a vegetable with pig meat by highlanders.

The lowland form of this species, with different and smaller flower form and less pleated leaves than Ficus dammaropsis, found commonly below 900 metres (2,950 ft) is recognized as a distinct species, Ficus brusii.

The species can be found at the Melbourne Botanic Gardens, located in the 'Yucca Bed'.

== Cultivation ==
With its bold tropical leaves and relative tolerance of cold, F. dammaropsis is cultivated as an ornamental tree in frost-free climates.
