= Nyctimystes narinosus =

Conservation status
- Least Concern (IUCN 3.1)

Scientific classification
- Kingdom: Animalia
- Phylum: Chordata
- Class: Amphibia
- Order: Anura
- Family: Hylidae
- Genus: Nyctimystes
- Species: N. narinosus

Binomial name
- Nyctimystes narinosus Zweifel, 1958

Synonyms
- Nyctimystes narinosa Zweifel, 1958; Litoria narinosa (Zweifel, 1958)

Species of amphibian

Nyctimystes narinosus, the common big-eyed treefrog, is a species of frog in the subfamily Pelodryadinae of the family Hylidae. It is endemic to New Guinea and occurs in the Wahgi-Sepik Dividing Range and the Schrader Mountains, on both sides of the border between Papua (Indonesia) and Papua New Guinea. There is, however, some uncertainty about the western limit of this species. Despite its vernacular name, Nyctimystes narinosus is not a common species.

== Description ==
The holotype, an adult female, measures 64 mm (2.5 in) in snout–vent length. Males measure 48–59 mm (1.9–2.3 in) in snout–urostyle length. The snout is high and blunt. The canthus rostralis is distinct. The tympanum is small but distinct, partly obscured by the prominent supratympanic fold. The palpebral reticulum forms an irregular broken network of brown lines. The fingers hava basal webbing whereas the toes are about three-quarters webbed. The dorsum is usually chocolate brown, sometimes paler. There is a varying amount of cream to bright orange decoration consisting of scattered blotches and broad dorsolateral bands that reach the lores; this color may occasionally cover the entire dorsum. The brown coloration fades on the flanks to an off-white belly with brown speckling, with denser speckling on the throat. The lips are spotted, The iris is mid-brown. Males have a subgular vocal sac.

The male advertisement call is a very loud "whistle". The tadpole is large and black or dark.

== Habitat and conservation ==
Ecology of Nyctimystes narinosus is poorly known. It is a high-altitude species, being found at elevations of 1,500–2,500 m (4,900–8,200 ft) above sea level or higher. In the Schrader Mountains, it only occurs in Nothofagus forest, living high in the trees. If similar to other Nyctimystes, the eggs are laid in torrential streams.

Nyctimystes narinosus is a low-density species. It is not known to occur in any protected areas. It is consumed locally.
