= Tree frog =

Type of amphibian

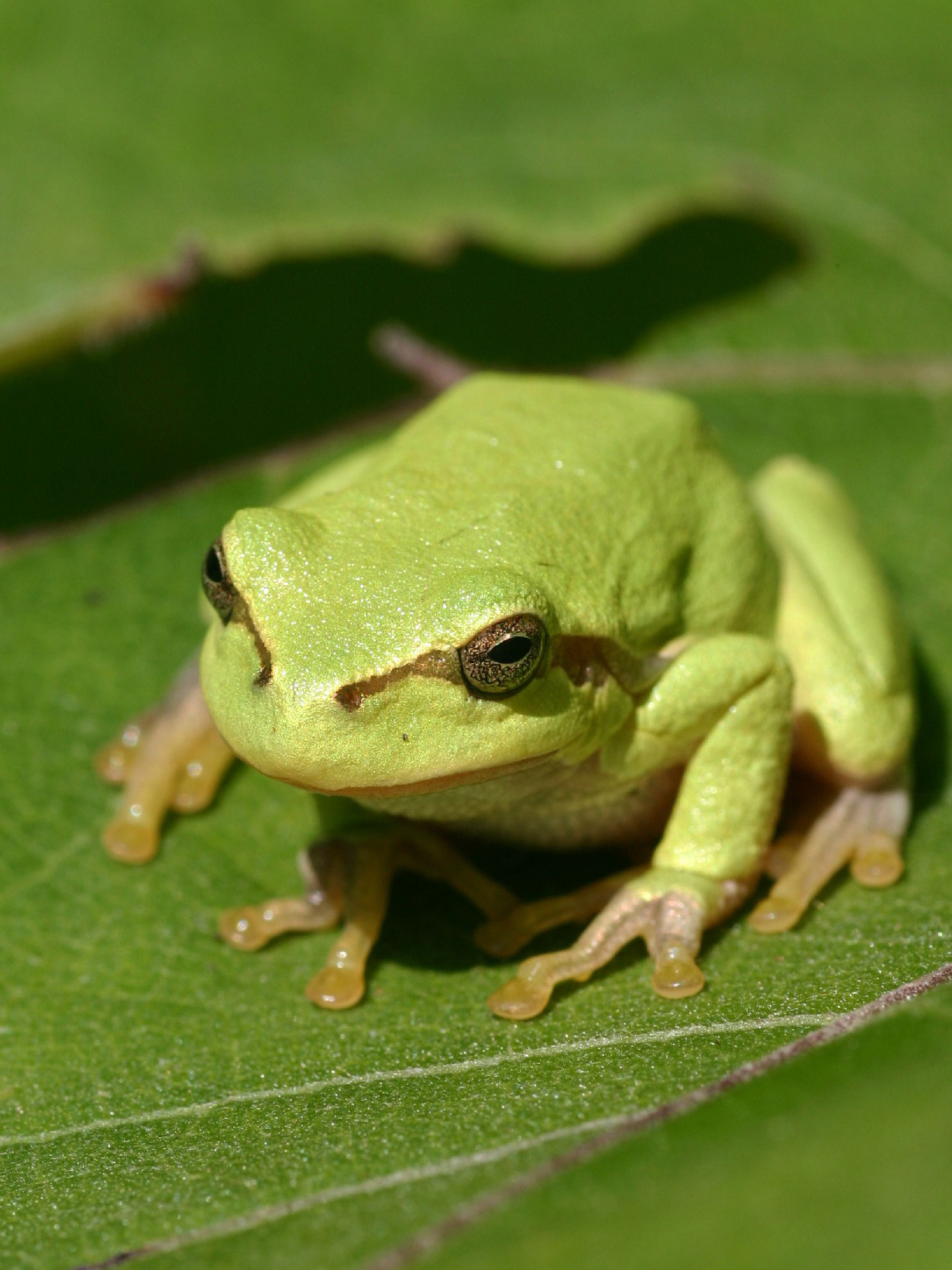
European treefrog (Hyla arborea)

A tree frog (or treefrog) is any species of frog that spends a major portion of its lifespan in trees, known as an arboreal state. Several lineages of frogs among the Neobatrachia suborder have given rise to treefrogs, although they are not closely related to each other.

Millions of years of convergent evolution have resulted in very similar morphology even in species that are not closely related. Furthermore, tree frogs in seasonally arid environments have adapted an extra-epidermal layer of lipid and mucus as an evolutionary convergent response to accommodate the periodic dehydration stress.

== Description ==
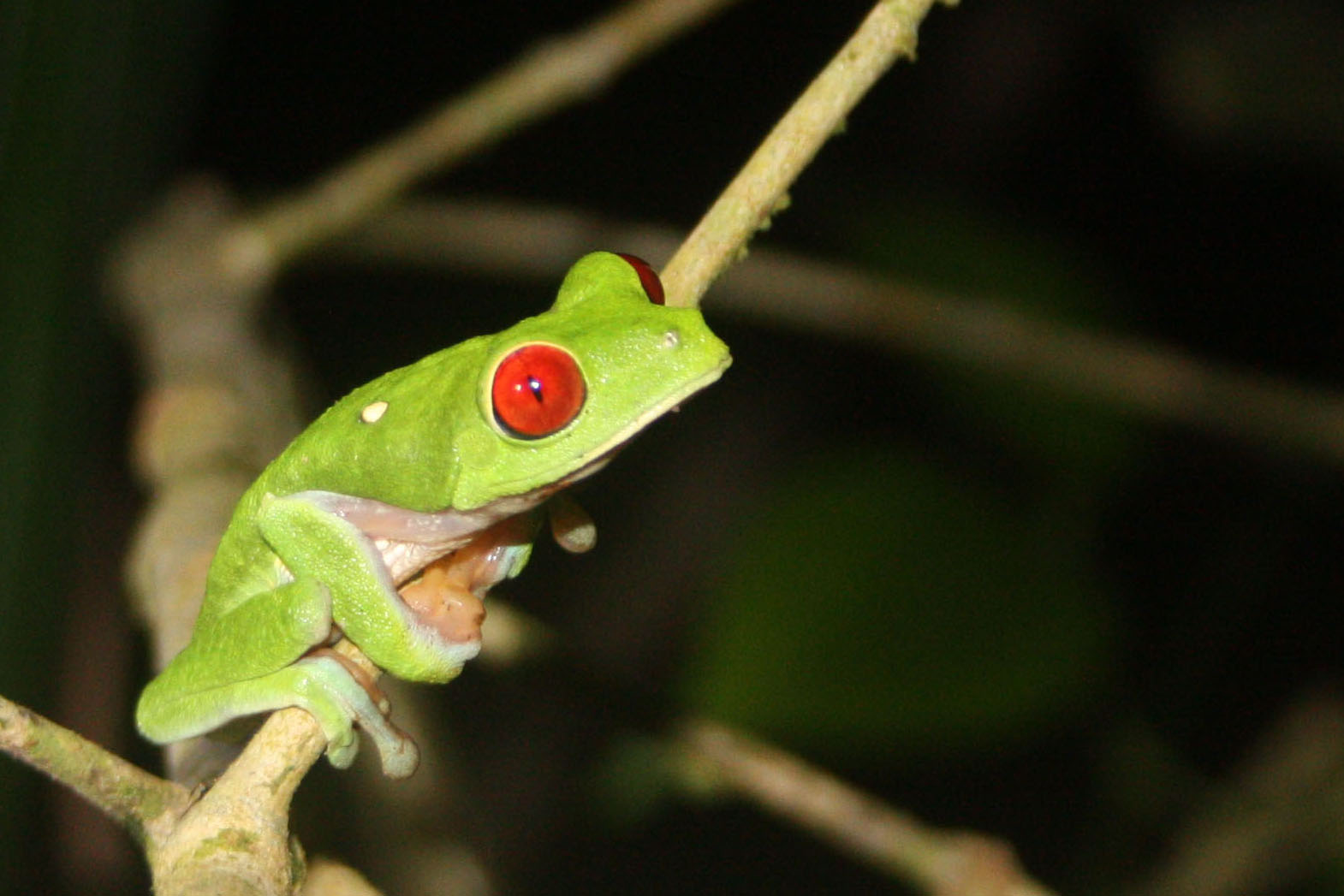
Red-eyed treefrog, Osa Peninsula, Costa Rica

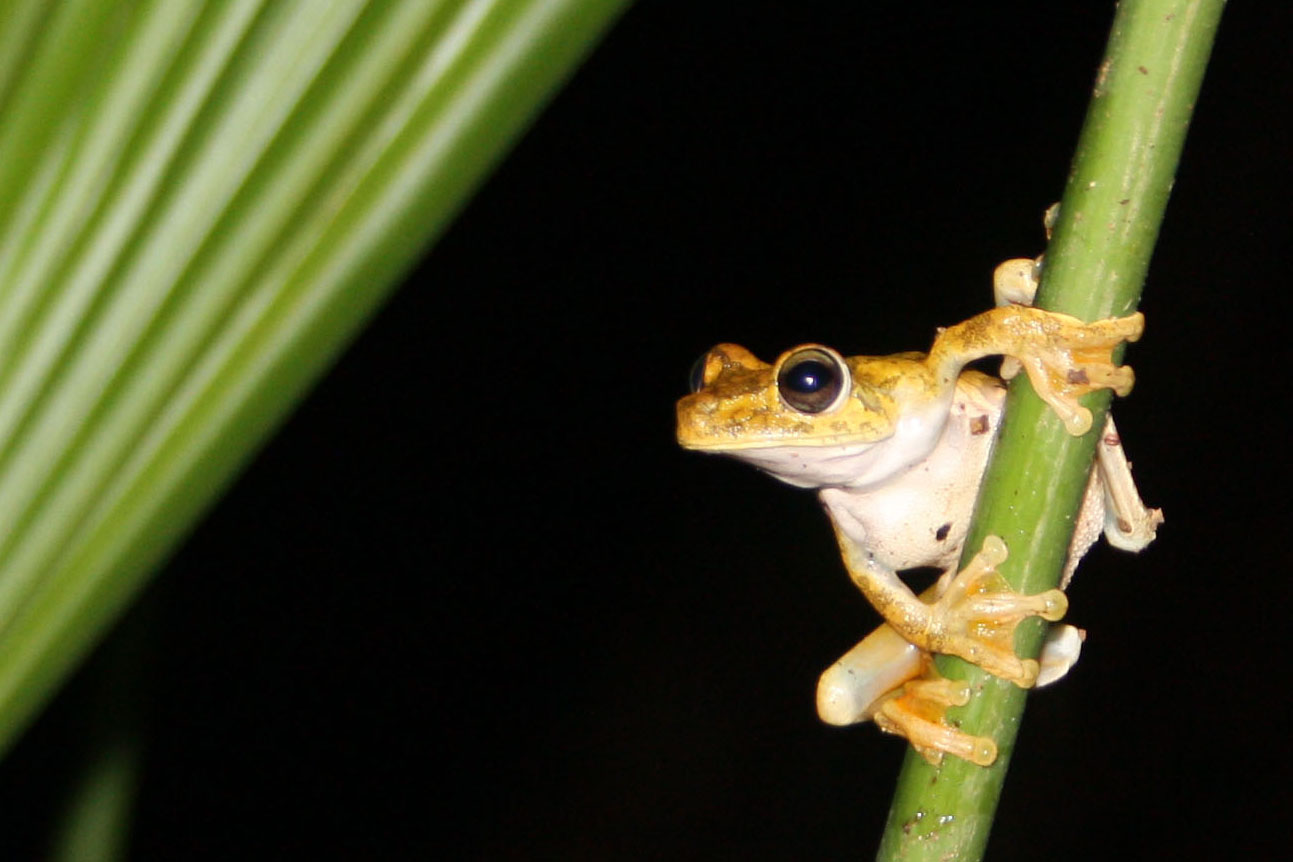
Gladiator treefrog (Hypsiboas rosenbergi), Osa Peninsula, Costa Rica

As the name implies, these frogs are typically found in trees or other high-growing vegetation. They do not normally descend to the ground, except to mate and spawn, though some build foam nests on leaves and rarely leave the trees at all as adults, and Eleutherodactylus has evolved direct development and therefore does not need water for a tadpole stage.

Tree frogs are usually tiny as their weight has to be carried by the branches and twigs in their habitats. While some reach 10 cm (4 in) or more, they are typically smaller and more slender than terrestrial frogs. Tree frogs typically have well-developed discs at the finger and toe tips, they rely on several attachment mechanisms that vary with circumstances, tree frogs require static, dynamic, adhesive, frictional, reversible and repeatable force generation; the fingers and toes themselves, as well as the limbs, tend to be rather small, resulting in a superior grasping ability. The genus Chiromantis of the Rhacophoridae is most extreme in this respect: it can oppose two fingers to the other two, resulting in a vise-like grip.

== Family ==
Tree frogs are members of these families or genera:

- Hylidae, or "true" treefrogs, occur in the temperate to tropical parts of Eurasia north of the Himalayas, Australia and the Americas.
- Rhacophoridae, or shrub frogs, are the treefrogs of tropical regions around the Indian Ocean: Africa, South Asia and Southeast Asia east to Lydekker's line. A few also occur in East Asia.
- Centrolenidae, or glass frogs, are potentially closely related to hylids; these translucent frogs are native to Central and South America.
- Hyperoliidae, or reed frogs, are closely related to the burrowing Microhylidae; these small frogs are native to sub-Saharan Africa.
- Boophis is a genus of highly arboreal frogs which evolved from the toxic terrestrial Mantellidae of Madagascar.

== Gallery ==
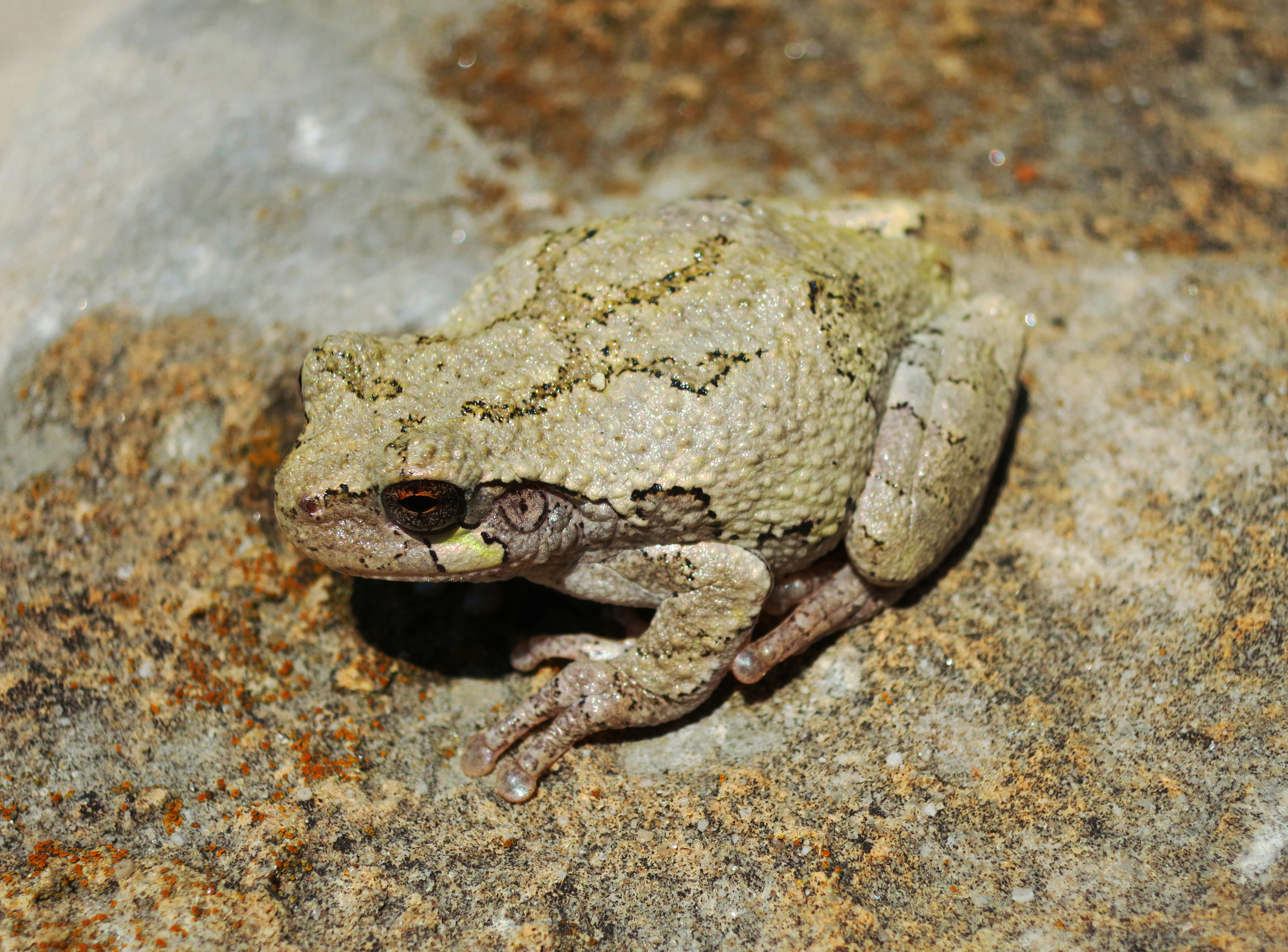
Gray tree frog, Hyla versicolor, Hylidae, eastern North America

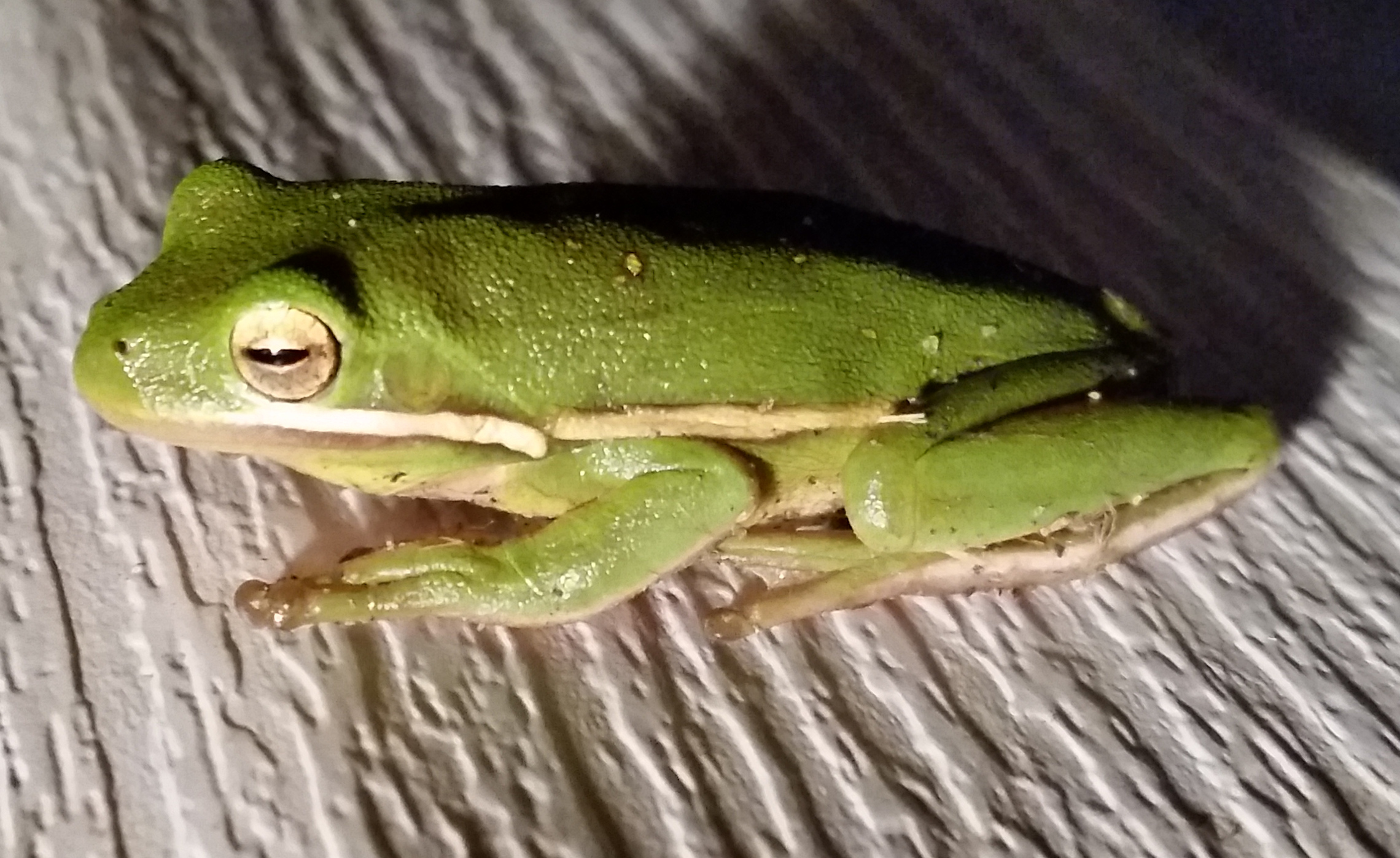
American green tree frog, Dryophytes cinereus or Hyla cinerea, Hylidae, central and southeastern United States

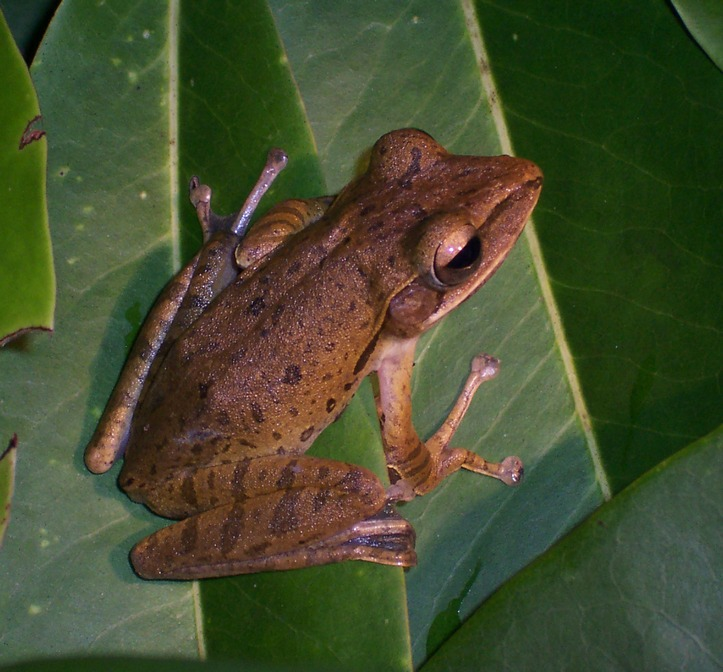
Common tree frog, Polypedates leucomystax, Rhacophoridae, southern to eastern Asia

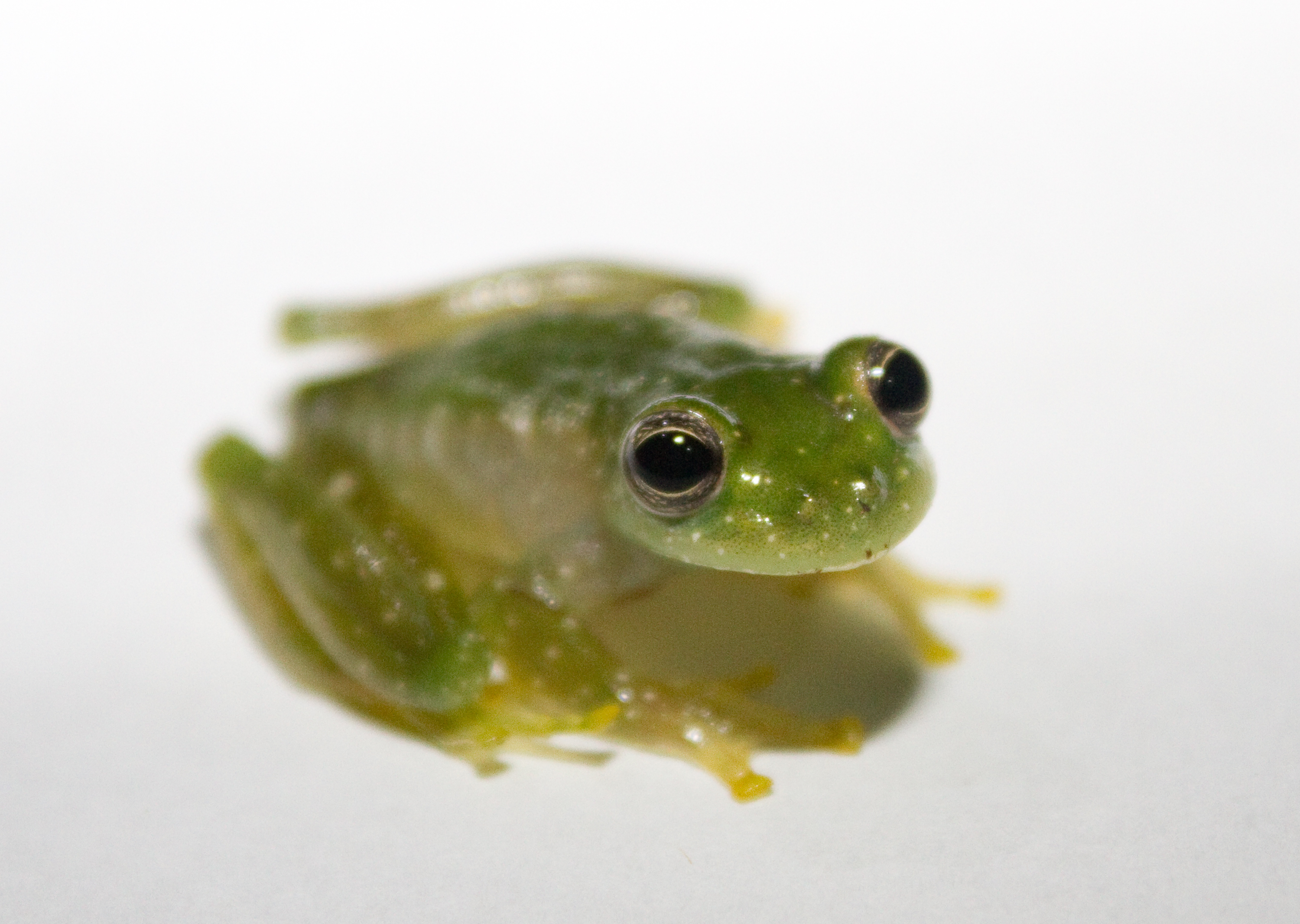
Powdered glass frog, Cochranella pulverata, Centrolenidae, Honduras to Ecuador

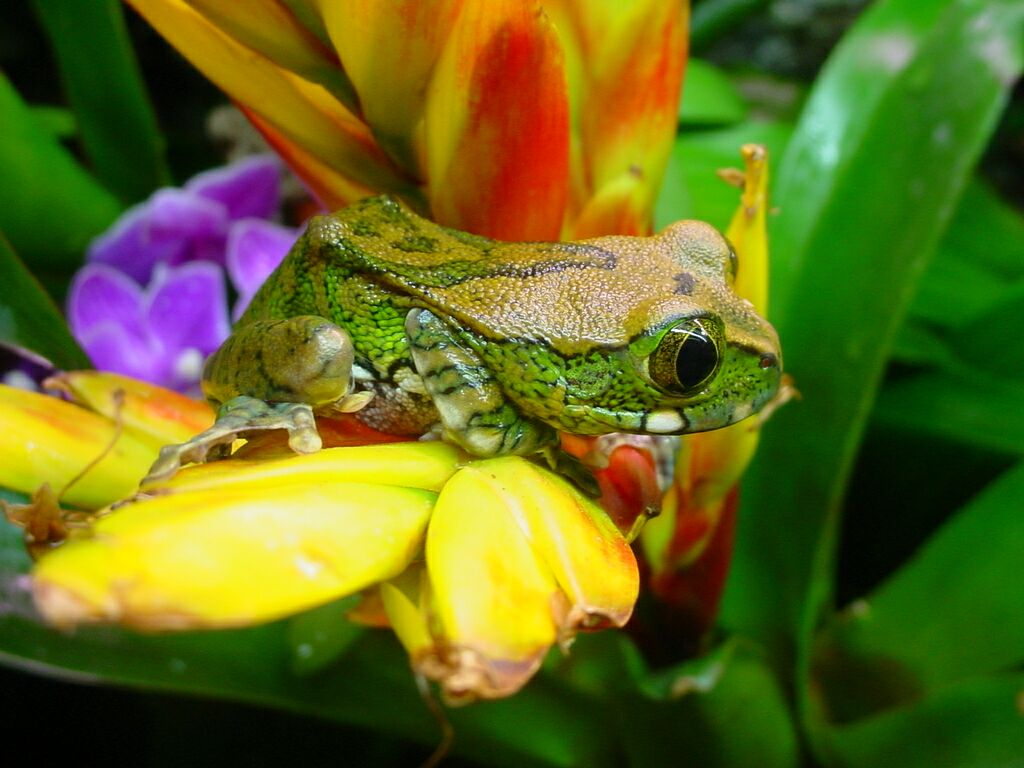
Big-eyed tree frog, Leptopelis vermiculatus, Hyperoliidae, Tanzania

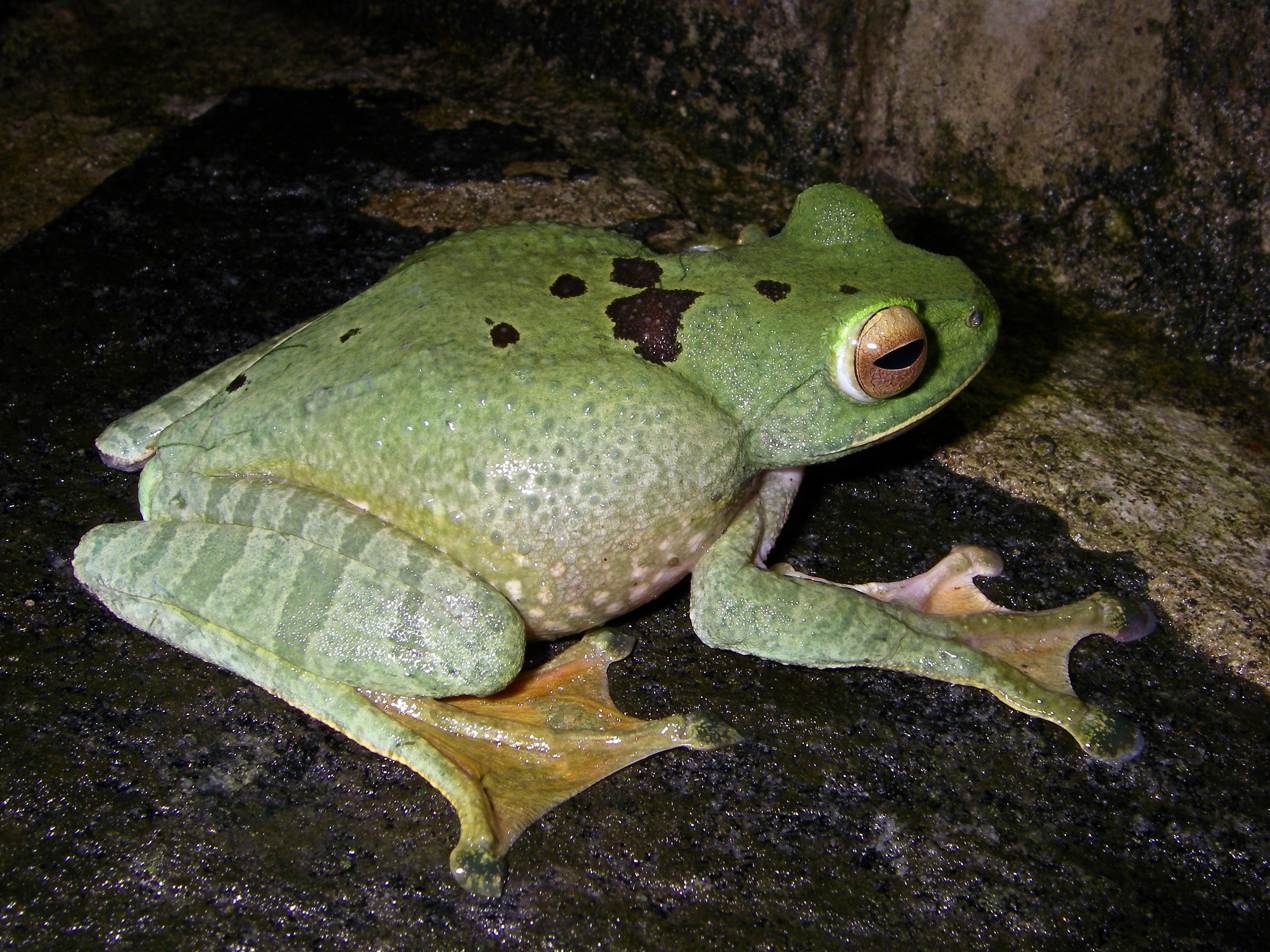
White-lipped bright-eyed frog, Boophis albilabris, Mantellidae, Madagascar

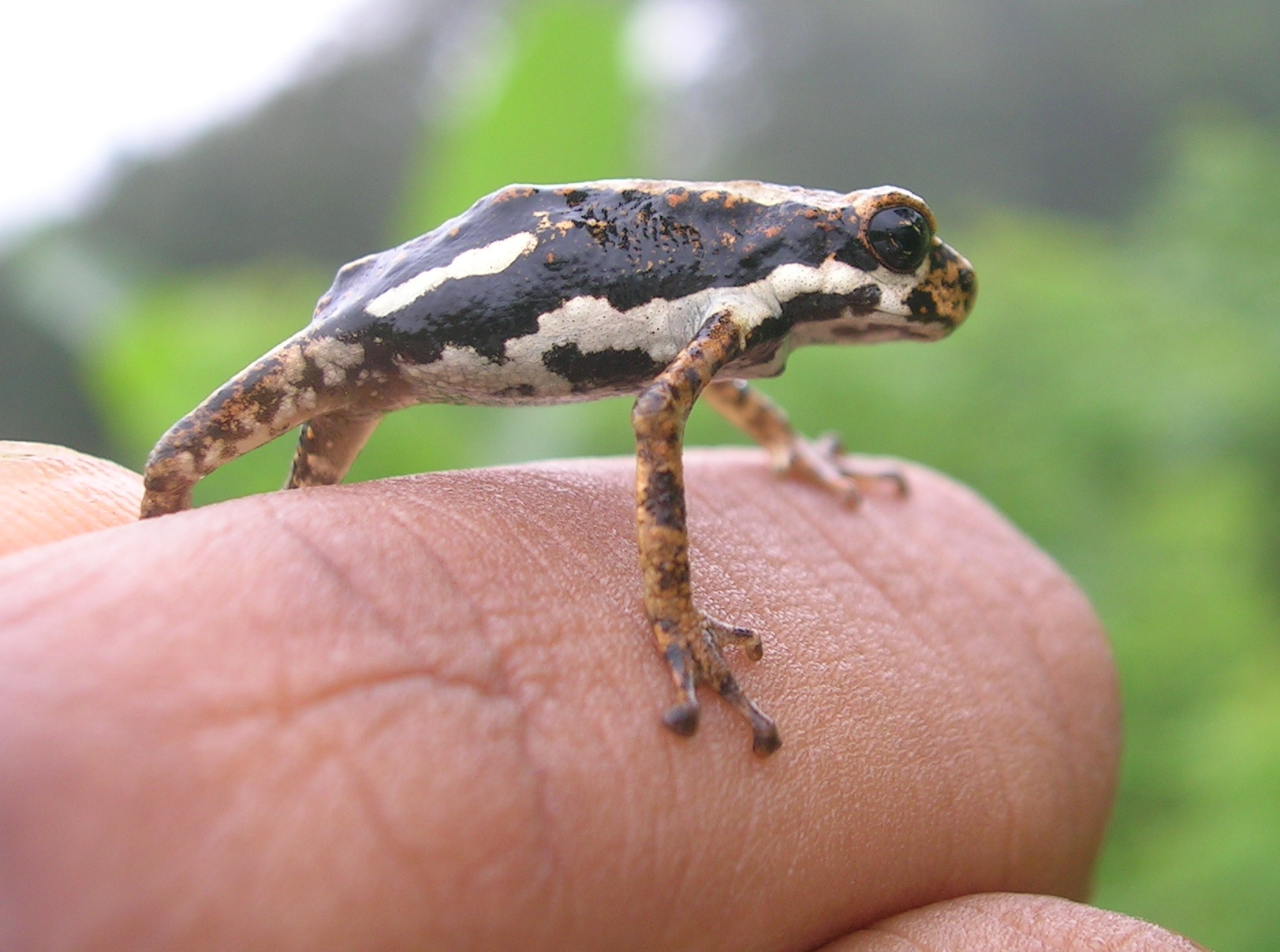
Malabar tree toad, Pedostibes tuberculosus, Hyperoliidae, India

Sound of treefrogs in south Georgia, US (78 seconds)

== Bibliography ==
- Langowski, J. K.; Dodou, D.; Kamperman, M.; van Leeuwen, J. L. (2018). "Tree frog attachment: Mechanisms, challenges, and perspectives". Frontiers in Zoology. 15 (1): 32. doi:10.1186/s12983-018-0273-x. PMC 6107968. PMID 30154908.
- Richardson, C.; Lengagne, T. (2009). "Multiple signals and male spacing affect female preference at cocktail parties in treefrogs". Proceedings of the Royal Society B: Biological Sciences. 277 (1685): 1247–1252. doi:10.1098/rspb.2009.1836. PMC 2842810. PMID 20018785.
