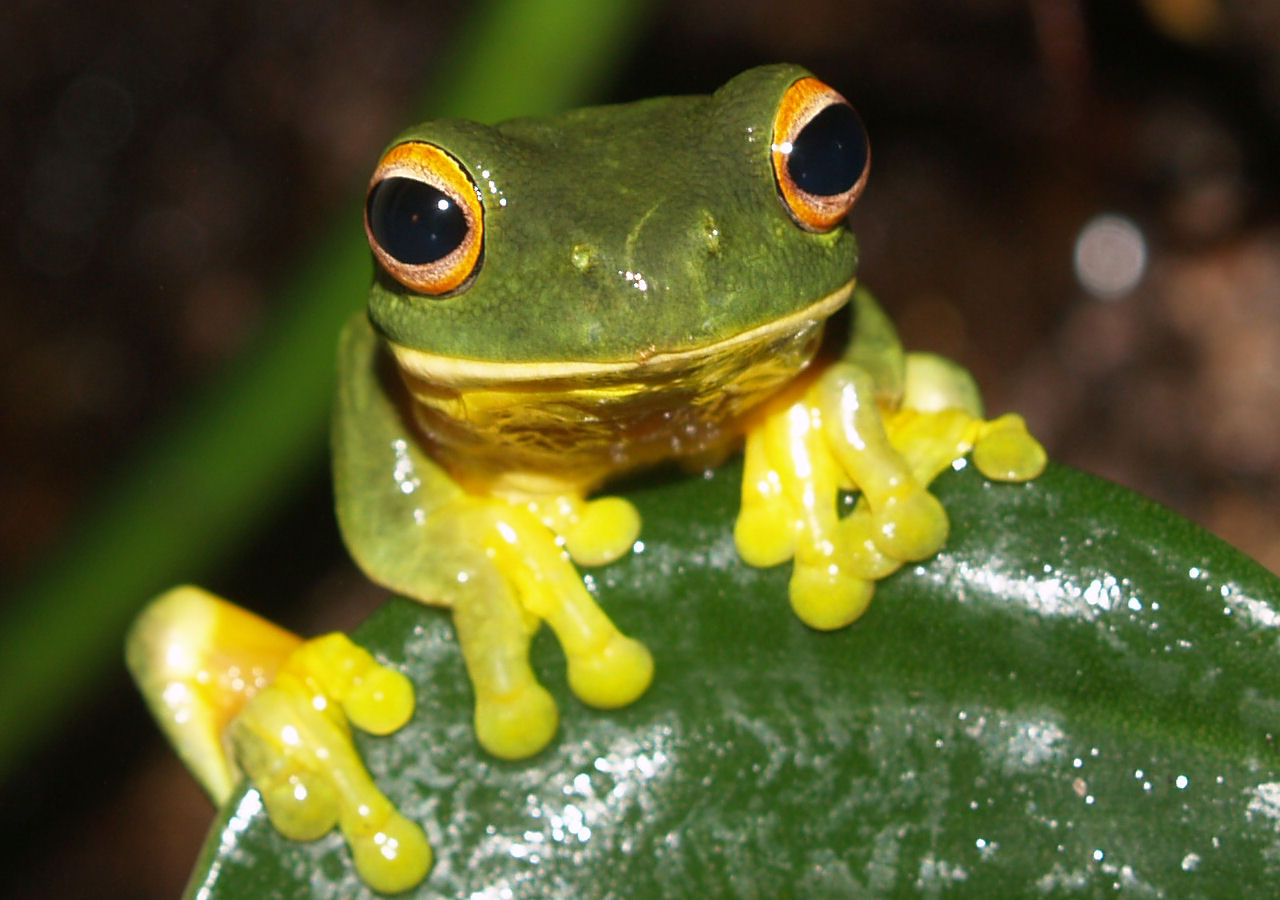
- Orange-thighed frog (Chlorohyla xanthomera)

Scientific classification
- Kingdom: Animalia
- Phylum: Chordata
- Class: Amphibia
- Order: Anura
- Superfamily: Hyloidea
- Family: Pelodryadidae; Günther, 1858

Type genus
- Pelodryas Günther, 1858
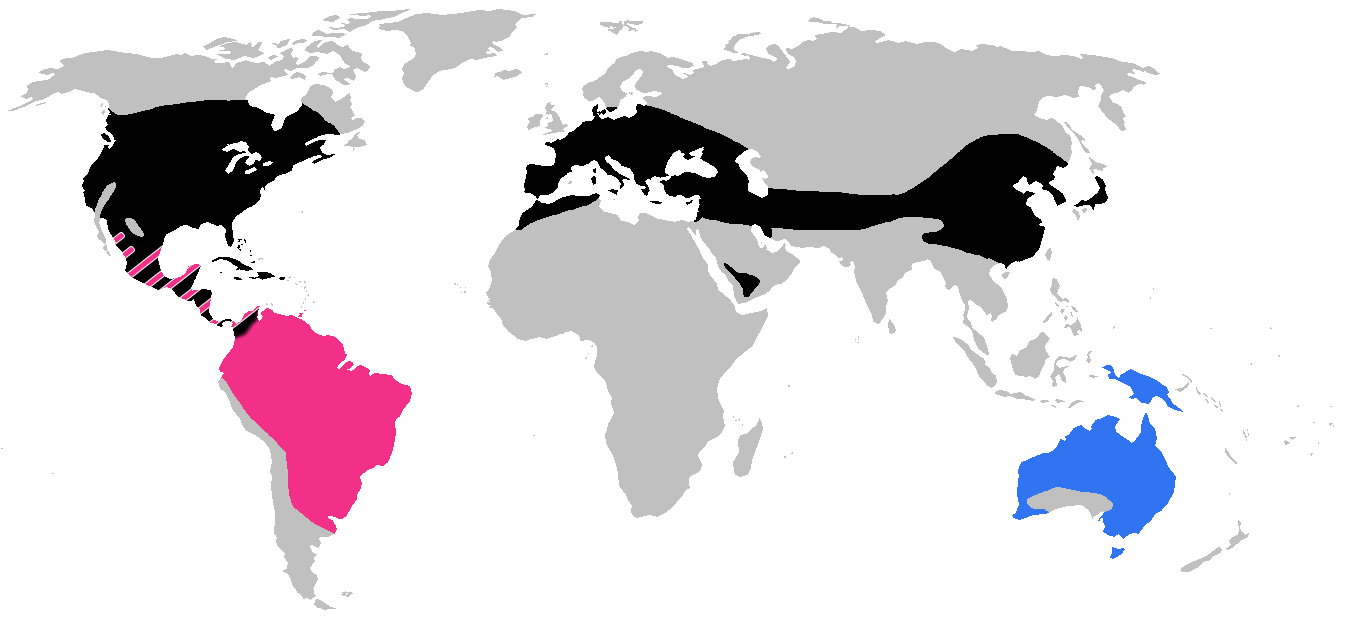
- Distribution of Pelodryadidae in blue, with other tree frog families: Hylidae in black and Phyllomedusidae in pink.

Synonyms
- Litoriinae Dubois and Frétey, 2016; Pelodryadinae Günther, 1858

= Pelodryadidae =

Pelodryadidae Temporal range: Early Eocene to present

Family of amphibians

Pelodryadidae, also known as Australian treefrogs (although not all members are arboreal), is a family of frogs found in Australia, New Guinea and their surrounding islands, and have also been introduced to Guam, New Caledonia, New Zealand, and Vanuatu.

Pelodryadidae is thought to be the sister group to the leaf frogs (Phyllomedusidae), a family of arboreal frogs known from the Neotropics. The common ancestor of both families is thought to have lived in the early Cenozoic South America, with the two subfamilies diverging from one another during the Eocene. The ancestors of the subfamily Pelodryadidae likely invaded Australasia via the Antarctic land bridge, which at the time was not yet frozen over, thus was hospitable for the dispersing frogs. The clade comprising both subfamilies is sister to the Hylinae, from which they diverged in the early Paleogene.

The oldest known fossil of a Pelodryadidae frog is of †Litoria tylerantiqua from 55 million years ago. This places a minimum age on the divergence of this group from the Phyllomedusidae, and confirms that these two groups likely diverged even earlier.

== Classification ==
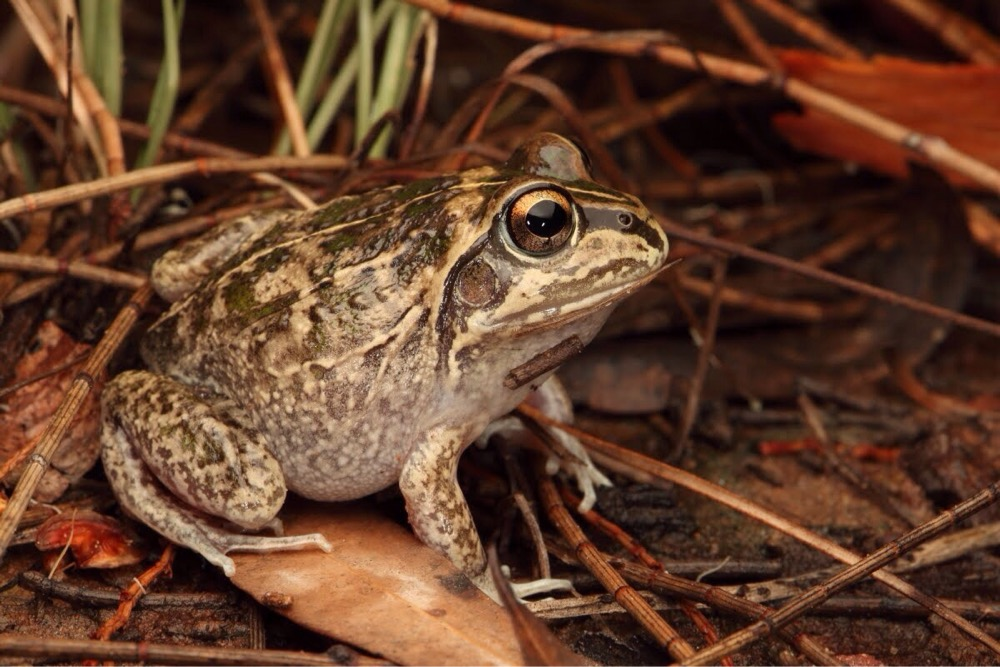
Rough frog (Cyclorana verrucosa)

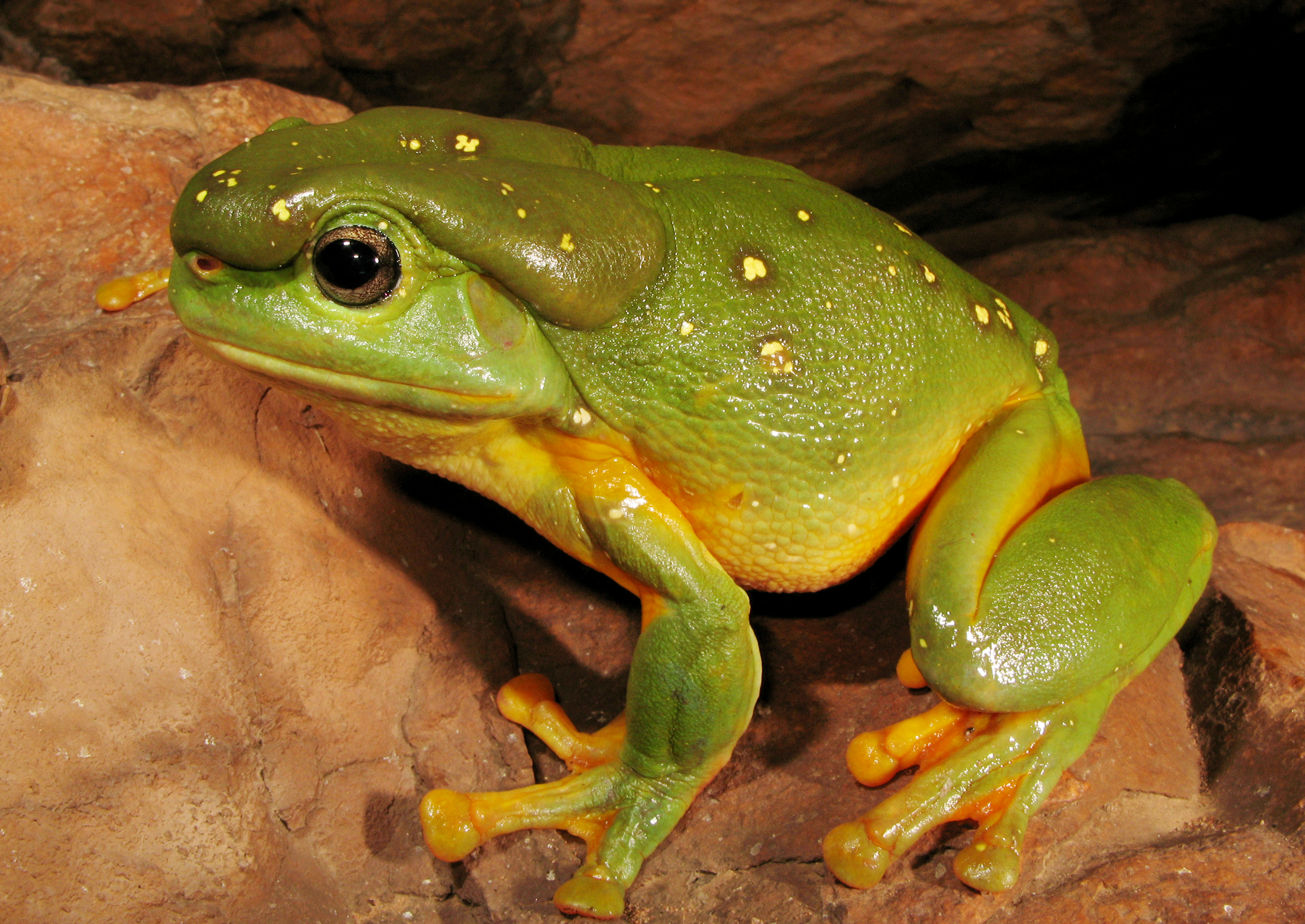
Magnificent tree frog (Pelodryas splendida)

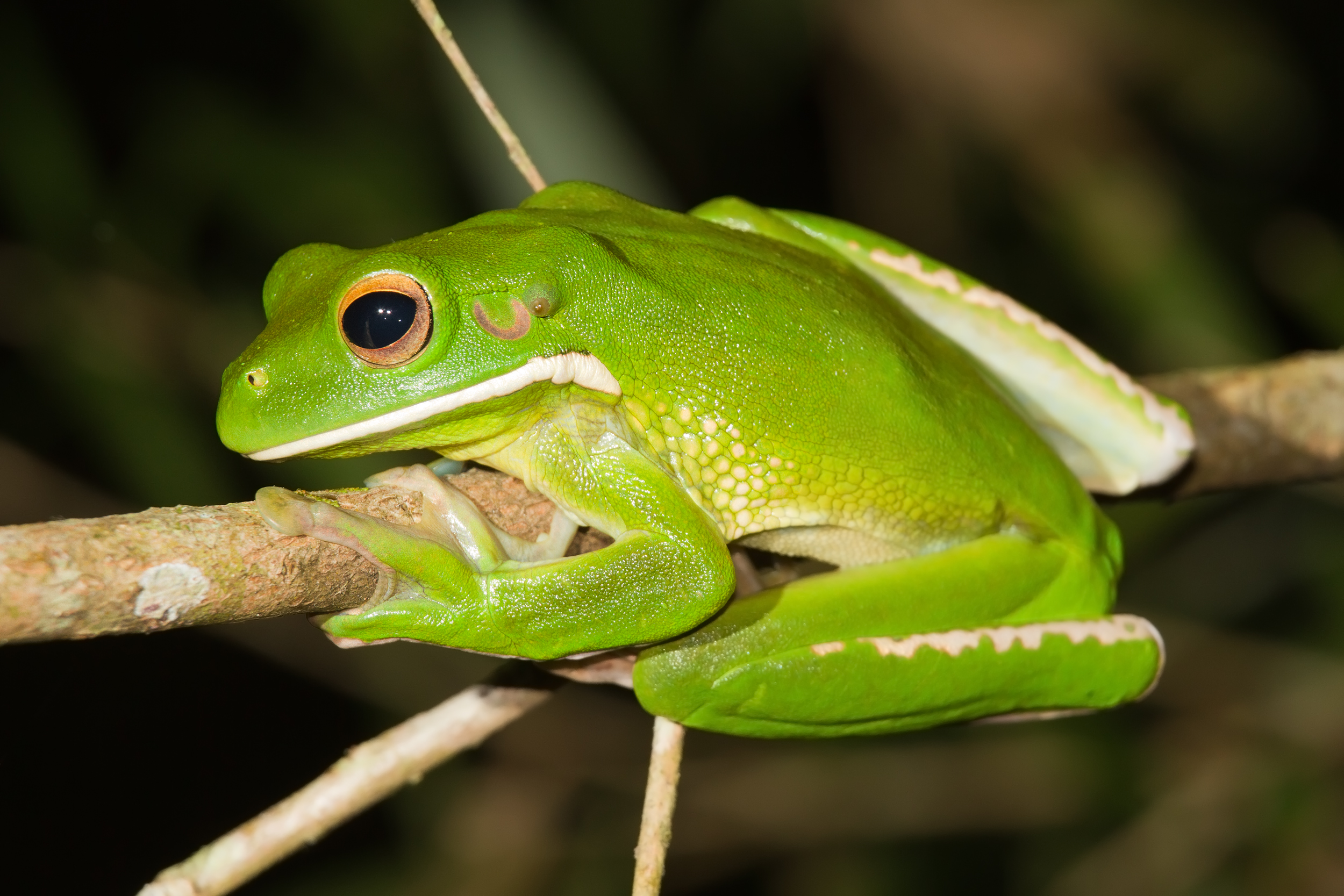
White-lipped tree frog (Sandyrana infrafrenata)

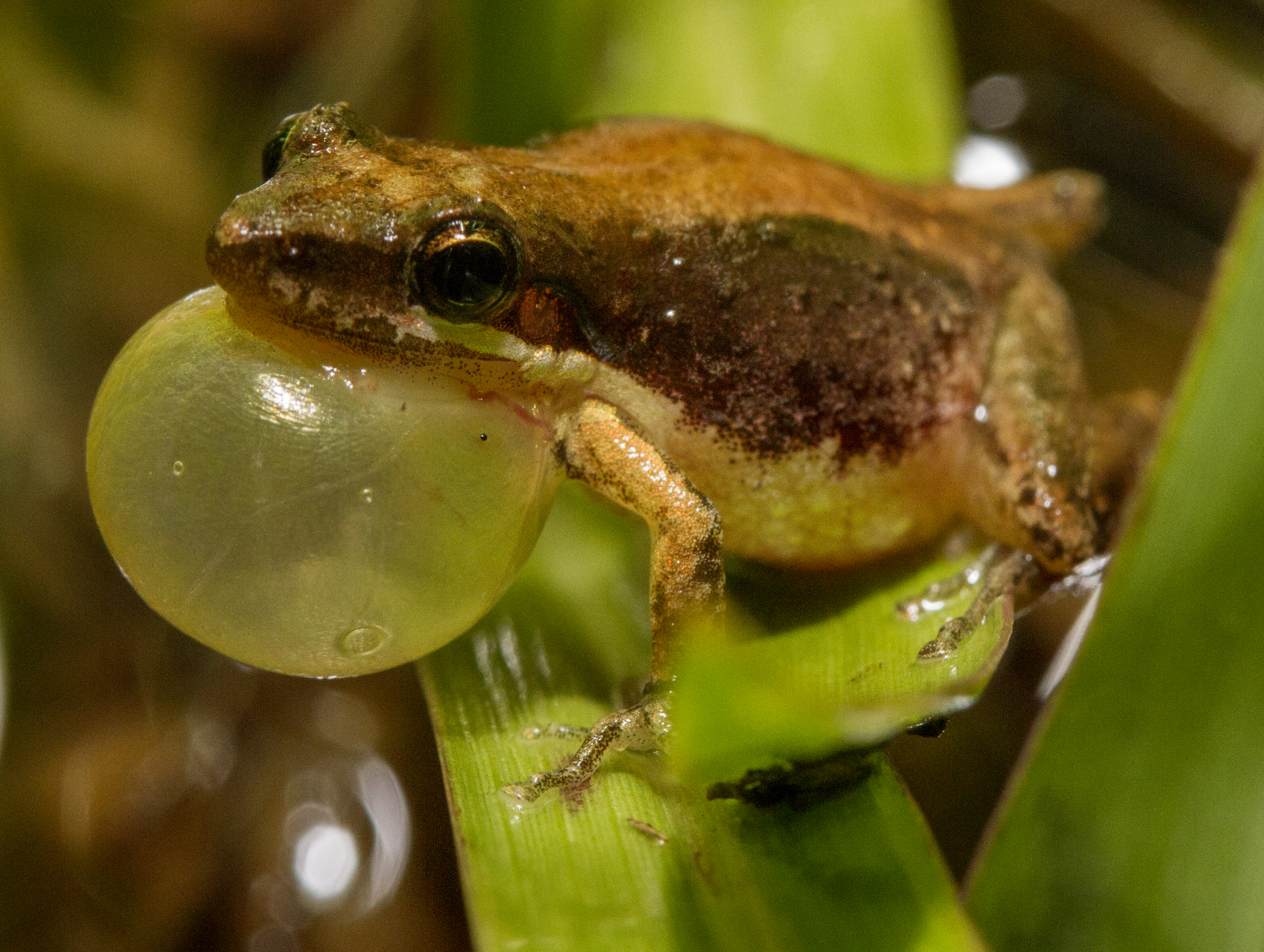
Javelin frog (Mahonabatrachus microbelos)

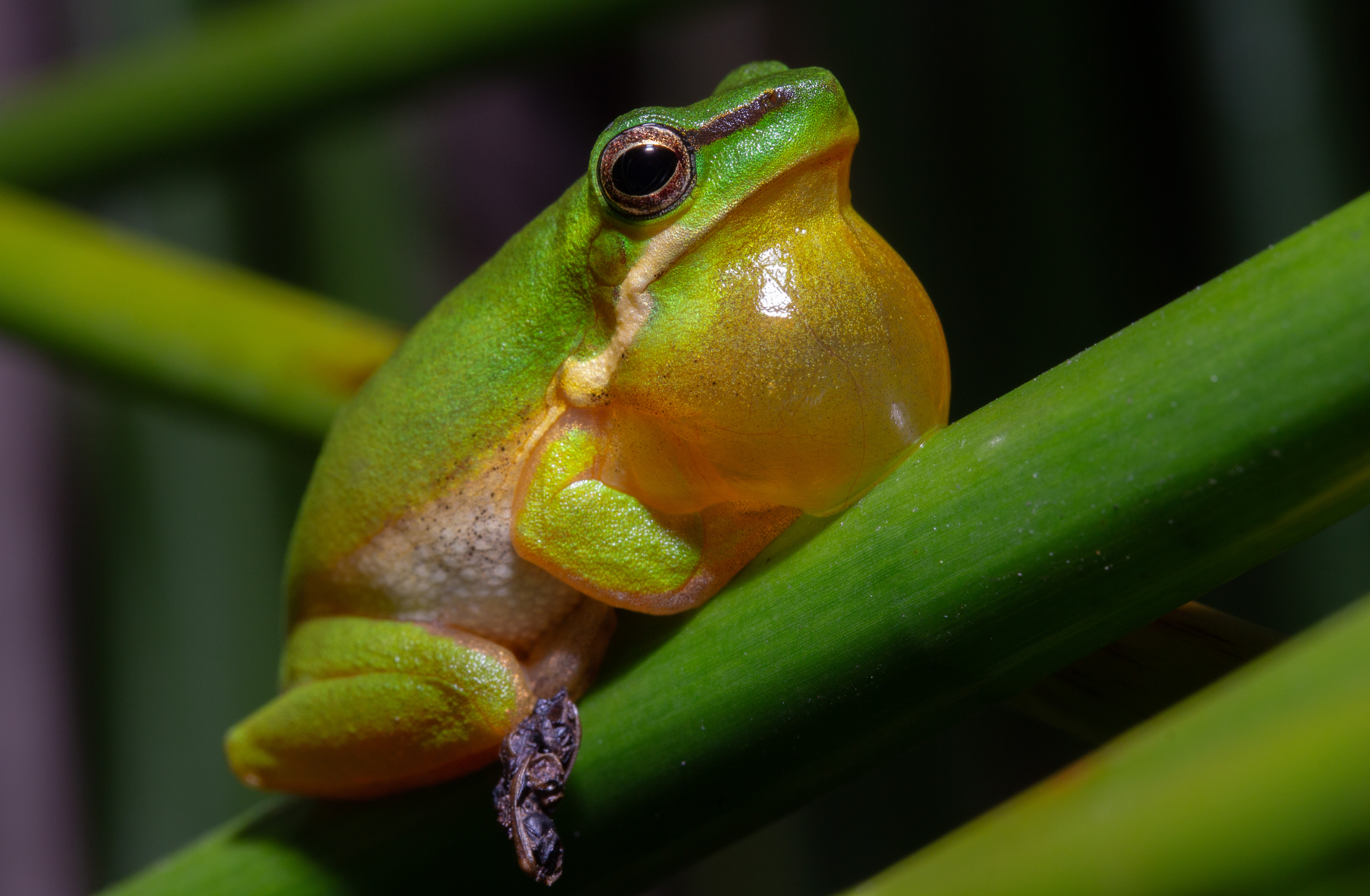
Eastern dwarf tree frog (Drymomantis fallax)

Pelodryadidae is sometimes considered a sub-family of Hylidae, but recent taxonomic papers have regarded it as a family. Prior to 2025, only three genera were used to describe the diversity of the family: Cyclorana for the burrowing species, Nyctimystes for the Papuan (and one Australian) species with laced lids, and Litoria, which became a wastebasket taxon for the remaining species. A comprehensive phylogenomic study in 2025 split the 246 species into 35 genera.

The cladogram below is based on this studies' analysis of nuclear DNA of frogs in Pelodryadidae, except Lathrana was not included so its position is based on their analysis of mitochondrial DNA:

- Pelodryadidae
  - - - - Eremnoculus
        - Mosleyia
      - - Dryopsophus
    - - - - Pelodryas
          - Chlorohyla
        - - - Melvillihyla
            - Rhyaconastes
          - Spicicalyx
      - - Ranoidea
        - - - Megatestis
            - Leptobatrachus
          - Cyclorana
  - - - Sylvagemma
      - - Sandyrana
        - Nyctimystes
    - - - - Saganura
          - Rawlinsonia
        - - Pengilleyia
          - Colleeneremia
      - - Mahonabatrachus
        - - - Coggerdonia
            - Litoria
          - - Drymomantis
            - - Carichyla
              - - - - Exedrobatrachus
                    - Papuahyla
                  - - Hyalotos
                    - - Ischnohyla
                      - Exochohyla
                - - - Nasutibatrachus
                    - - Viridihyla
                      - - Kallistobatrachus
                        - - K. chloronotus
                          - - Teretistes
                            - Lathrana
                  - Amnihyla

One species is regarded an incertae sedis:

- "Litoria" jeudii (Werner, 1901)

The following fossil genera are also known:

- †Australobatrachus Tyler, 1976 - Oligocene or Miocene of South Australia
- †Etnabatrachus Hocknull, 2003 - Pliocene or Pleistocene of Mount Etna, Queensland
