= Australian Frog Calls =

Recording by Songs of Disappearance
- Released: 2 December 2022
- Genre: Frog calls
- Length: 53:00
- Label: Bowerbird Collective
- Producer: Anthony Albrecht

Songs of Disappearance chronology
Australian Bird Calls (2021)	Australian Frog Calls (2022)	Australian Mammal Calls (2023)

Australian Frog Calls (also referred to as Songs of Disappearance: Australian Frog Calls) is an album of Australian frog calls, released on 2 December 2022 by the Bowerbird Collective and Australian Museum. The album debuted at number 3 on the ARIA Charts.

== Background ==
The album follows Australian Bird Calls, which was composed of endangered Australian bird calls and peaked at number 2 on the ARIA Charts in February 2022.

== Production ==
Australian Frog Calls was a collaboration between the Bowerbird Collective, Australian Museum FrogID project, Listening Earth and Mervyn Street of Mangkaja Arts. The album was produced by Anthony Albrecht.

== Description and impact ==
The album is a compilation of frog sounds from both biologist recordings and public submissions. Calls featured on the album date back to the 1970s from FrogID's database.

The project brings attention to FrogID Week, an annual event where the public are encouraged to download the free FrogID app and record the frogs they hear calling around them. The project also highlights that one in six Australian native frog species are currently threatened, with four already extinct. In addition to raising awareness, proceeds from the album are donated to the Australian Museum's national FrogID project. FrogID project coordinator Nadiah Roslan said "Frogs are amongst the most threatened groups of animals on the planet and declining more rapidly than any other animal group... This decline is concerning because we need frogs to be around—they play such an important role in healthy ecosystems and this role can't be filled by any other animal group."

== Release and reception ==
The album was released on 2 December 2022.

It debuted at number 3 on the ARIA Charts, and was nominated for ARIA Award for Best World Music Album at the 2023 ARIA Music Awards.

== Reception ==
A staff writer at The Music posted a review consisting entirely of frog noises.

The album debuted at number 3 on the ARIA charts behind Paul Kelly's Christmas Train and Taylor Swift's Midnights.

== Track listing ==
Australian Frog Calls track listing
No.	Title	Length
1.	"Songs of Disappearance"	3:31
2.	"Common eastern froglet"	0:49
3.	"Eastern Banjo Frog"	1:01
4.	"Littlejohns' Toadlet"	0:57
5.	"Desert Spadefoot Toad"	0:26
6.	"Tasmanian Tree Frog"	0:42
7.	"Motorbike Frog"	0:17
8.	"Magnificent Tree Frog"	0:15
9.	"Green Tree Frog"	0:25
10.	"Northern Snapping Frog"	0:36
11.	"Rattling Nursery Frog"	0:37
12.	"Flat-headed Frog"	0:17
13.	"Tusked Frog"	0:22
14.	"Sunset Frog"	0:35
15.	"Davies' tree frog"	0:27
16.	"Cave Frog"	0:15
17.	"Northern Flinders Ranges Froglet"	0:28
18.	"Moss Froglet"	0:19
19.	"Wallum sedge frog"	0:36
20.	"Howard Springs toadlet"	0:37
21.	"Green and Golden Bell Frog"	0:46
22.	"Southern Barred Frog"	0:43
23.	"Magnificent Brood Frog"	0:37
24.	"Southern Bell Frog"	0:37
25.	"Australian lace-lid"	0:32
26.	"Orange-bellied Froglet"	0:43
27.	"Tapping Nursery Frog"	0:46
28.	"Giant Burrowing Frog"	0:36
29.	"Booroolong Frog"	0:42
30.	"Mahony's Toadlet"	0:19
31.	"Southern Corroboree Frog"	0:17
32.	"Fleay's Barred Frog"	0:23
33.	"Northern Heath Frog"	0:26
34.	"Giant Barred Frog"	0:22
35.	"Baw Baw Frog"	0:22
36.	"Northern Corroboree Frog"	0:22
37.	"Southern Heath Frog"	0:22
38.	"Hosmer's Nursery Frog"	0:22
39.	"Richmond Mountain Frog"	0:21
40.	"Eungella Day Frog"	0:51
41.	"Sloane's froglet"	0:13
42.	"Mountain Frog"	0:28
43.	"Kroombit Tops Tinker Frog"	0:47
44.	"Mountain-Top Nursery Frog"	0:36
45.	"White-bellied Frog"	0:56
46.	"Mt Elliot Nursery Frog"	0:31
47.	"Bellenden Ker Nursery Frog"	0:49
48.	"Kuranda Tree Frog"	0:37
49.	"Beautiful Nursery Frog"	0:50
50.	"Spotted Tree Frog"	0:50
51.	"Northern Tinker Frog"	0:18
52.	"Mountain Mist Frog"	0:21
53.	"Yellow-spotted Bell Frog"	0:41
54.	"Sharp-snouted Day Frog"	0:21
55.	"Southern Gastric Frog"	1:05
56.	"Northern Gastric-brooding Frog"	1:10
57.	"Peppered Tree Frog"	0:18
58.	"Armoured Mist Frog"	0:17
59.	"Southern Day Frog"	0:18
60.	"Eastern Banjo Frog"	3:26
61.	"Screaming Tree Frog"	3:23
62.	"Western Spotted Frog"	3:21
63.	"Eastern Dwarf Tree frog"	3:19
64.	"Spotted March Frog"	3:17
Total length:		53:00

== Charts ==
Chart performance for Australian Frog Calls
Chart (2022)	Peak position
Australian Albums (ARIA)	3
