= Sphenophryne stenodactyla =

Conservation status
- Least Concern (IUCN 3.1)

Scientific classification
- Kingdom: Animalia
- Phylum: Chordata
- Class: Amphibia
- Order: Anura
- Family: Microhylidae
- Genus: Sphenophryne
- Species: S. stenodactyla

Binomial name
- Sphenophryne stenodactyla (Zweifel, 2000)

Synonyms
- Oxydactyla stenodactyla Zweifel, 2000

Species of frog

Sphenophryne stenodactyla is a species of frog in the family Microhylidae. It is endemic to Papua New Guinea and known from the New Guinea Highlands in the Western Highlands, Chimbu, Eastern Highlands Provinces at elevations between 2,490 and 4,000 m (8,170 and 13,120 ft) above sea level. The specific name stenodactyla is derived from the Greek words stenos meaning "narrow" and dactylos meaning "digit".

== Description ==
Adult males measure 22–31 mm (0.87–1.22 in) and females 25–32 mm (0.98–1.26 in) in snout–vent length. The head is narrower than the plump body. The eyes are relatively small. The tympanum is barely visible. The dorsum is mottled in two shades of brown; small areas of paler ground color are occasionally showing through (coloration is highly variable between individuals and areas). Both the fingertips and toe tips are flattened but not disclike. There is no webbing between the fingers or the toes.

The male advertisement call has been variously described as "woodeny croaking", "soft chirping krrr, krrr not unlike that of a cricket", and "a single short enh, rapidly repeated".

== Habitat and conservation ==
Its natural habitats are alpine grassland with tree ferns. It is very common in suitable habitat. There are no known threats to this species, although it could be impacted by fires.
