= Cophixalus pipilans =

Conservation status
- Least Concern (IUCN 3.1)

Scientific classification
- Kingdom: Animalia
- Phylum: Chordata
- Class: Amphibia
- Order: Anura
- Family: Microhylidae
- Genus: Cophixalus
- Species: C. pipilans

Binomial name
- Cophixalus pipilans Zweifel, 1980

Species of frog

Cophixalus pipilans is a species of frog in the family Microhylidae. It is endemic to northern mainland Papua New Guinea and occurs between Lae (Morobe Province) and the Adelbert Mountains (Madang Province). The specific name pipilans is derived from the Latin verb pipilio and means "peeping". Common name Sempi rainforest frog has been coined for this species.

== Description ==
Adult males measure 16–19 mm (0.6–0.7 in) and adult females 18–22 mm (0.7–0.9 in) in snout–vent length. The head is moderately wide. The snout is obtusely pointed. The tympanum is obscure. The first finger is very short and without a disc, while the other fingers are larger and have well-developed discs. Toes have discs that are larger than the finger ones. No interdigital webbing is present. Dorsal colouration is brown to yellowish tan with black face mask. The middle of the back is sometimes much paler and clearly distinct from the sides. The groin, and anterior and posterior surfaces of the thighs, have a pink to reddish orange tinge. The throat and chest are gray with pale flecks.

The male advertisement call is a series of rather soft, high-pitched beeps that are emitted in groups of 20–33. The dominant frequency is about 4900–5300 Hz.

== Habitat and conservation ==
Cophixalus pipilans occurs in lowland rainforest at elevations up to 700 m (2,300 ft) above sea level. Specimens have been found in leaf litter in the daytime and on low shrubs (no more than 1 m (3 ft 3 in) above the ground) at night. Males typically call on humid nights after recent rain. Development is direct (i.e., there is no free-living larval stage).

It is a common species, but some populations could be threatened by logging. It is not known to occur in any protected areas.
