= Xenorhina zweifeli =

Conservation status
- Least Concern (IUCN 3.1)

Scientific classification
- Kingdom: Animalia
- Phylum: Chordata
- Class: Amphibia
- Order: Anura
- Family: Microhylidae
- Genus: Xenorhina
- Species: X. zweifeli

Binomial name
- Xenorhina zweifeli (Kraus and Allison, 2002)

Synonyms
- Xenobatrachus zweifeli Kraus and Allison, 2002

Species of frog

Xenorhina zweifeli is a species of frog in the family Microhylidae. It is endemic to New Guinea and is only known from the Bewani and Hunstein Mountains in northern Papua New Guinea. The species is named for American herpetologist Richard G. Zweifel, a specialist in New Guinean herpetology and microhylid frogs; he is also said to share "characteristically terse vocalizations" with this frog.

== Description ==
Adult measure 33–38 mm (1.3–1.5 in) in snout–vent length. The snout is truncate. The tympanic ring is indistinct and the supratympanic fold is not well-developed. The fingers have no discs while the toes bear expanded discs. No webbing is present. Dorsal surface is scattered with low, rounded tubercles, while the ventral surfaces are smooth. Dorsal coloration is variable and can be mostly uniform light chocolate-brown, but with a yellow vertebral stripe and darker on head and anterior part of body, or without a vertebral stripe but heavily mottled with tan and brown blotches overlaid with black specks and small black blotches.

The male advertisement call consists of a single note uttered irregularly but frequently during the day and early evening.

== Habitat and conservation ==
Xenorhina zweifeli is known from primary forest and forest clearings at elevations of about 900–1,920 m (2,950–6,300 ft) above sea level. These frogs are fossorial, with individuals occupying small cavities on the forest floor. Development is direct (i.e, there is no free-living larval stage).

There are no known threats to this species found in isolated areas. It is patchily distributed but can be locally common; it is uncommon in the Hunstein Mountains. It is not known to occur in any protected area.
