= Xenorhina obesa =

Conservation status
- Least Concern (IUCN 3.1)

Scientific classification
- Kingdom: Animalia
- Phylum: Chordata
- Class: Amphibia
- Order: Anura
- Family: Microhylidae
- Genus: Xenorhina
- Species: X. obesa

Binomial name
- Xenorhina obesa (Zweifel, 1960)

Synonyms
- Xenobatrachus obesus Zweifel, 1960

Species of frog

Xenorhina obesa is a species of frog in the family Microhylidae.

It is found in West Papua in Indonesia and Papua New Guinea. Its natural habitat is subtropical or tropical moist lowland forests.

It was first described, as Xenobatrachus obesus, in 1960 by Richard G. Zweifel, from a type specimen collected by Margaret and Ernest Gilliard.
