= Cophixalus cryptotympanum =

Conservation status
- Least Concern (IUCN 3.1)

Scientific classification
- Kingdom: Animalia
- Phylum: Chordata
- Class: Amphibia
- Order: Anura
- Family: Microhylidae
- Genus: Cophixalus
- Species: C. cryptotympanum

Binomial name
- Cophixalus cryptotympanum Zweifel, 1956

Species of frog

Cophixalus cryptotympanum (common name Zweifel's rainforest frog) is a species of frog in the family Microhylidae. It is endemic to Papua New Guinea. Its natural habitat is tropical moist montane forests.
