= Sphenophryne coggeri =

Conservation status
- Data Deficient (IUCN 3.1)

Scientific classification
- Kingdom: Animalia
- Phylum: Chordata
- Class: Amphibia
- Order: Anura
- Family: Microhylidae
- Genus: Sphenophryne
- Species: S. coggeri

Binomial name
- Sphenophryne coggeri (Zweifel, 2000)

Synonyms
- Oxydactyla coggeri Zweifel, 2000

Species of frog

Sphenophryne coggeri is a species of frog in the family Microhylidae. It is endemic to New Guinea and known from two regions in Papua New Guinea, one in the Madang Province and the other in the Southern Highlands Province (the intervening areas have seen little survey work). The specific name coggeri honors Harold Cogger, a herpetologist from the Australian Museum.

== Description ==
Adult males measure 19–27 mm (0.75–1.06 in) and females 21–28 mm (0.83–1.10 in) in snout–vent length. The head is slightly narrower than the body. The eyes are relatively large. The tympanum is indistinct. The fingertips are flattened but not disc-like; the toe tips are disc-like. There is no webbing between the fingers or the toes.

The male advertisement call is a single-note call, consisting of several notes uttered in rapid succession.

== Habitat and conservation ==
Its natural habitats are montane forests and it has been found under logs and in leaf litter. It has been collected at elevations between 2,000 and 2,400 m (6,600 and 7,900 ft) above sea level. There is no information about threats to this little known species.
