= Cophixalus nubicola =

Conservation status
- Vulnerable (IUCN 3.1)

Scientific classification
- Kingdom: Animalia
- Phylum: Chordata
- Class: Amphibia
- Order: Anura
- Family: Microhylidae
- Genus: Cophixalus
- Species: C. nubicola

Binomial name
- Cophixalus nubicola Zweifel, 1962
- Cophixalus nubicola is only known from Mount Michael in Papua New Guinea

Species of frog

Cophixalus nubicola is a species of frog in the family Microhylidae. It is endemic to Papua New Guinea and only known from its type locality, Mount Michael in the Eastern Highlands Province. The specific name nubicola refers to its cloud-swept habitat. Common name Michael rainforest frog has been coined for this species.

== Description ==
Adult males measure 22–24 mm (0.87–0.94 in) and adult females up to 29 mm (1.1 in) in snout–vent length. The snout is bluntly rounded. The tympanum is visible but not prominent, and it is partially hidden by a weak supratympanic fold. The fingers and toes bear discs that are better developed on the former. No webbing is present. The body is dorsally slightly rugose and ventrally granular. The dorsal color is reddish brown. A fine vertebral line and light spots may be present. Ventral surfaces are lightly mottled.

Cophixalus nubicola is similar to Cophixalus parkeri but has shorter legs and less well-developed finger discs.

== Habitat and conservation ==
The type series was collected from montane rainforest and alpine grassland on a cloud-swept ridge of Mount Michael at an elevation of 3,100 m (10,200 ft) above sea level.

Cophixalus nubicola has not been collected after its description, but there have been no surveys either. The forests at higher elevations of Mount Michael experience pressure from the high human population density in the adjacent lowlands, constituting a threat. Furthermore, the species is only known from a single location, which is not protected.
