= Cophixalus shellyi =

Conservation status
- Least Concern (IUCN 3.1)

Scientific classification
- Kingdom: Animalia
- Phylum: Chordata
- Class: Amphibia
- Order: Anura
- Family: Microhylidae
- Genus: Cophixalus
- Species: C. shellyi

Binomial name
- Cophixalus shellyi Zweifel, 1956

Species of frog

Cophixalus shellyi is a species of frog in the family Microhylidae. It is endemic to Papua New Guinea and occurs in the New Guinea Highlands as well as in the Adelbert Range and on the Huon Peninsula. The specific name shellyi honors Father Otto Schellenberger ("Shelly"), an American missionary and former professor in mathematics who collected the type series.

== Common names ==
The common name Shelly's rainforest frog has been coined for this species.

It is known as gwnm sbmganpygak in the Kalam language of Papua New Guinea.

== Description ==
Adult males grow to at least 17 mm (0.7 in) and adult females to 20 mm (0.8 in) in snout–vent length; females appear to reach maturity at 16 mm (0.6 in). The snout is obtusely pointed. The tympanum is very indistinct, and the supratympanic fold is very faint. The legs are relatively long. The fingers and toes bear discs that are relatively small. The first finger is very short and bears no distinctly enlarged disc. Preserved specimens are grayish brown dorsally. The side of the head is black. A faint, light mid-vertebral line may be present.

== Habitat and conservation ==
Cophixalus shellyi occurs in low vegetation of hill and montane rainforests, including formerly logged forests, at elevations of 1,100–2,900 m (3,600–9,500 ft) above sea level. Specimens have also been found in landslides, rockslides, and rocky areas. Development is presumably direct (i.e., no free-living larval stage).

It is a locally common species that is not facing known threats. It is not known from protected areas.
