= Cophixalus humicola =

Conservation status
- Least Concern (IUCN 3.1)

Scientific classification
- Kingdom: Animalia
- Phylum: Chordata
- Class: Amphibia
- Order: Anura
- Family: Microhylidae
- Genus: Cophixalus
- Species: C. humicola

Binomial name
- Cophixalus humicola Günther, 2006

Species of microhylid frog

Cophixalus humicola is a species of microhylid frog endemic to the Papua Province in New Guinea. It was described by Rainer Günther in 2006.

== Taxonomy and systematics ==
Cophixalus humicola was described by Rainer Günther in 2006, on the basis of an adult male specimen collected at an altitude of 670 m (2,200 ft) on Waira Mountain on Yapen Island. The specific name humicola is from the Latin words humus, meaning soil, and colere, meaning to inhabit. It refers to the terrestrial lifestyle of the species, as most species in the genus Cophixalus are arboreal.

The species is most closely related to Cophixalus tridactylus and C. bewaniensis.

== Description ==
It is light brown to cream with darkish marks.

== Distribution and habitat ==
Cophixalus humicola has been reported from the Waira and Amoman Mountains on Yapen Island, the Foja Mountains in northern New Guinea, and along the Nabire-Mapia road on mainland New Guinea. It probably also occurs in areas between its known locations. It is found at elevations of 500–1,150 m (1,640–3,770 ft).

It is a terrestrial species that lives on the ground in primary and secondary forest, along with montane rainforest. It perches on humus and on or between leaf litter. It probably can not survive in open habitats.

== Breeding ==
The species breeds through direct development by laying its eggs on damp terrestrial habitats.

== Status ==
Cophixalus humicola is listed as least concern by the IUCN due to its large range and presumed large population. However, the species is locally rare where it occurs. It may be threatened by selective logging and clearcutting in parts of its range. It may also be threatened by the introduction of chytrid fungus.
