= Cophixalus verecundus =

Conservation status
- Least Concern (IUCN 3.1)

Scientific classification
- Kingdom: Animalia
- Phylum: Chordata
- Class: Amphibia
- Order: Anura
- Family: Microhylidae
- Genus: Cophixalus
- Species: C. verecundus

Binomial name
- Cophixalus verecundus Zweifel & Parker, 1989

Species of frog

Cophixalus verecundus is a species of frog in the family Microhylidae. It is endemic to New Guinea in Papua New Guinea, where it is only known around Mt. Bellamy in Owen Stanley Mountains though it may more widely distributed.

Cophixalus verecundus was described by Richard G. Zweifel and Fred Parker in 1989. It is a brown frog with grey underside; the eyelids, middle of the back and snout are redder than the sides. In size the species is small, with snout-to-vent body length around 15–19 mm; females are slightly larger on average than males. Compared to the most other Cophixalus species in New Guinea it has poorly developed digital disks and the third toe is longer than the fifth. The species has been found in montane forest at an altitude of around 2000 metres, where the frogs hide under surface leaf-litter during daytime. Males call during night-time from cover; the specific name of the species verecundus, meaning 'shy' in Latin, refers to this behaviour.
