= Cape York frog =

Conservation status
- Data Deficient (IUCN 3.1)

Scientific classification
- Kingdom: Animalia
- Phylum: Chordata
- Class: Amphibia
- Order: Anura
- Family: Microhylidae
- Genus: Cophixalus
- Species: C. peninsularis

Binomial name
- Cophixalus peninsularis Zweifel, 1985

Species of amphibian

The Cape York frog or peninsula frog (Cophixalus peninsularis) is a species of frog in the family Microhylidae. It is endemic to Australia. Its natural habitat is subtropical or tropical moist lowland forests.
