= Cophixalus balbus =

Conservation status
- Least Concern (IUCN 3.1)

Scientific classification
- Kingdom: Animalia
- Phylum: Chordata
- Class: Amphibia
- Order: Anura
- Family: Microhylidae
- Genus: Cophixalus
- Species: C. balbus

Binomial name
- Cophixalus balbus Günther, 2003

Species of amphibian

Cophixalus balbus is a species of frogs in the family Microhylidae. Molecular data suggest that it might belong to the genus Oreophryne. It is known from the vicinity of its type locality in Yapen island, Papua Province, Indonesia, as well as from the Hunstein Mountains (East Sepik Province) and Bewani and Torricelli Mountains (West Sepik Province) in Papua New Guinea.

== Etymology ==
The specific name balbus is Latin for "stuttering". This refers to its advertisement call: the first part of the call consists of single notes at relative longer intervals, followed by the second part where intervals are shorter and notes come in groups—this gives an impression of stuttering.

== Description ==
Cophixalus balbus are small frogs, though relatively large among Cophixalus: adult males measure 26–28 mm (1.0–1.1 in) in snout–vent length. Head is large and as wide as long. Ground colour is yellowish-brownish, with dorsal surfaces covered with small warts. There is a conspicuous, dark grey W-shaped mark in the scapular region.

== Habitat and conservation ==
Its natural habitat are patches of primary and secondary rainforest. The Yapen island records are from elevations of 600–700 m (2,000–2,300 ft) above sea level, with uncertain records from lower elevations. All specimens were found perched on fern fronds or on shrubs up to 3 m above the ground. The New Guinean records are from 210–1,000 m (690–3,280 ft) a.s.l.

There are no known threats to this species.
