= Cophixalus sphagnicola =

Conservation status
- Endangered (IUCN 3.1)

Scientific classification
- Kingdom: Animalia
- Phylum: Chordata
- Class: Amphibia
- Order: Anura
- Family: Microhylidae
- Genus: Cophixalus
- Species: C. sphagnicola

Binomial name
- Cophixalus sphagnicola Zweifel & Allison, 1982

Species of frog

Cophixalus sphagnicola is a species of frog in the family Microhylidae. It is endemic to Papua New Guinea. Its natural habitats are subtropical or tropical moist montane forests and subtropical or tropical high-altitude grassland.
