= Sphenophryne crassa =

Conservation status
- Least Concern (IUCN 3.1)

Scientific classification
- Kingdom: Animalia
- Phylum: Chordata
- Class: Amphibia
- Order: Anura
- Family: Microhylidae
- Genus: Sphenophryne
- Species: S. crassa

Binomial name
- Sphenophryne crassa Zweifel, 1956

Synonyms
- Oxydactyla crassa (Zweifel, 1956)

Species of frog

Sphenophryne crassa is a species of frog in the family Microhylidae. It is endemic to eastern New Guinea and is known from the Mount Dayman and Mount Simpson in the Owen Stanley Range, Papua New Guinea. Common name Papua land frog has been proposed for it.

Sphenophryne crassa is fossorial frog that occurs in open tussock grass and shrublands, and sometimes, in montane closed-canopy forest, at elevations of 2,050–2,600 m (6,730–8,530 ft) above sea level. It is a common species in suitable habitat. It is probably not facing any significant threats in its remote habitats.
