= Xenorhina similis =

Conservation status
- Least Concern (IUCN 3.1)

Scientific classification
- Kingdom: Animalia
- Phylum: Chordata
- Class: Amphibia
- Order: Anura
- Family: Microhylidae
- Genus: Xenorhina
- Species: X. similis

Binomial name
- Xenorhina similis (Zweifel, 1956)

Species of frog

Xenorhina similis is a species of frog in the family Microhylidae. It is found in New Guinea. Its natural habitat is subtropical or tropical moist montane forests. It is threatened by habitat loss.
