= Nubeoscincus =

Scientific classification
- Kingdom: Animalia
- Phylum: Chordata
- Class: Reptilia
- Order: Squamata
- Family: Scincidae
- Subfamily: Eugongylinae
- Genus: Nubeoscincus; Slavenko, Tamar, Tallowin, Kraus, Allison, Carranza, & Meiri, 2021

Species
- 2, see text.

Genus of reptiles

Nubeoscincus is a genus of skinks in the subfamily Eugongylinae. The genus Nubeoscincus is endemic to New Guinea. The genus name, derived from Latin nubes (=cloud) and scincus, refers to high elevations at which species in this genus occur.

Nubeoscincus are medium-sized terrestrial skinks with short limbs and adults measuring 47–64 mm (1.9–2.5 in) in snout–vent length.

== Species ==
There are 2 species:

- Nubeoscincus glacialis (Greer, Allison & Cogger, 2005)
- Nubeoscincus stellaris (Greer, Allison & Cogger, 2005)

Nota bene: A binomial authority in parentheses indicates that the species was originally described in a genus other than Nubeoscincus.
