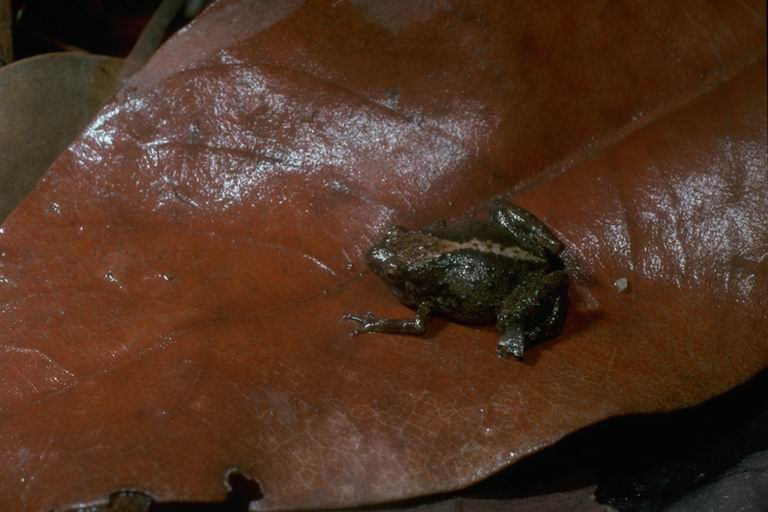

Conservation status
- Least Concern (IUCN 3.1)

Scientific classification
- Kingdom: Animalia
- Phylum: Chordata
- Class: Amphibia
- Order: Anura
- Family: Microhylidae
- Genus: Cophixalus
- Species: C. infacetus

Binomial name
- Cophixalus infacetus Zweifel, 1985

= Inelegant frog =

Species of amphibian

The inelegant frog (Cophixalus infacetus) is a species of frog in the family Microhylidae. It is also known as the creaking frog or the creaking nursery frog due to its singular call. It is endemic to Australia. Its natural habitat is subtropical or tropical moist lowland forests. It is threatened by habitat loss.
