= Sphenophryne similis =

Conservation status
- Data Deficient (IUCN 3.1)

Scientific classification
- Kingdom: Animalia
- Phylum: Chordata
- Class: Amphibia
- Order: Anura
- Family: Microhylidae
- Genus: Sphenophryne
- Species: S. similis

Binomial name
- Sphenophryne similis (Zweifel, 2000)
- Sphenophryne similis is only known from near the Myola Guest House in eastern Papua New Guinea

Synonyms
- Liophryne similis Zweifel, 2000

Species of frog

Sphenophryne similis is a species of frog in the family Microhylidae. It is endemic to New Guinea and is only known from its type locality in the Owen Stanley Range, Northern Province, Papua New Guinea.

Sphenophryne similis is known from leaf litter on the forest floor in lower montane forest at an elevation of 2,080 m (6,820 ft) above sea level. It was relatively common. There are no known threats facing it.
