= Neglected frog =

Conservation status
- Critically Endangered (IUCN 3.1)

Scientific classification
- Kingdom: Animalia
- Phylum: Chordata
- Class: Amphibia
- Order: Anura
- Family: Microhylidae
- Genus: Cophixalus
- Species: C. neglectus

Binomial name
- Cophixalus neglectus Zweifel, 1962

Species of frog

The neglected frog (Cophixalus neglectus) is a species of frog in the family Microhylidae. It is endemic to Australia. Its natural habitats are subtropical or tropical moist montane forests. It is threatened by habitat loss.
