= Austrochaperina septentrionalis =

Conservation status
- Least Concern (IUCN 3.1)

Scientific classification
- Kingdom: Animalia
- Phylum: Chordata
- Class: Amphibia
- Order: Anura
- Family: Microhylidae
- Genus: Austrochaperina
- Species: A. septentrionalis

Binomial name
- Austrochaperina septentrionalis Allison & Kraus, 2003

Species of frog

Austrochaperina septentrionalis is a species of frog in the family Microhylidae endemic to Papua New Guinea.

== Distribution and habitat ==
Austrochaperina septentrionalis is only known to live in the Bewani Mountains, but it may also exist in mountains north of Sepik River such as Torricelli Mountains and Cyclops Mountains. The population of the species is unknown, but it is considered to be uncommon.

Its natural habitats are subtropical or tropical moist lowland forests and subtropical or tropical moist montane forests. Specimens have been found from heights of 950 – 1200 meters (about 3,100 - 3,950 feet).
