= Xenorhina parkerorum =

Conservation status
- Least Concern (IUCN 3.1)

Scientific classification
- Kingdom: Animalia
- Phylum: Chordata
- Class: Amphibia
- Order: Anura
- Family: Microhylidae
- Genus: Xenorhina
- Species: X. parkerorum

Binomial name
- Xenorhina parkerorum Zweifel, 1972

Species of frog

Xenorhina parkerorum is a species of frog in the family Microhylidae. It is endemic to New Guinea Highlands and occurs in both eastern Western New Guinea (Indonesia) and western Papua New Guinea. Common name Imigabip snouted frog has been proposed for it. The specific name parkerorum honours herpetologists Fred Parker and Hampton Wildman Parker.

== Description ==
This species can reach 68 mm (2.7 in) in snout–vent length. The body is broad and tapers to a relatively narrow head with a pointed snout. The eyes are small. The tympanum is indistinct, but the supratympanic fold is well-developed. Low dorsolateral folds are present. Skin is dorsally pustulose and laterally more prominently so. The finger and toe tips bear distinct but only slightly enlarged discs. No webbing is present. The dorsum is brown, becoming noticeably darker on the top and sides of the head and tympanum. The sides of the head are flecked with white. The dorsolateral folds are darker brown than the surroundings, as are the low pustules of the back and sides. The groin is dark brown. The ventral surfaces are brown with faint lighter mottling and spots. The throat is darker than the abdomen. Males have a single singular vocal sac.

== Habitat and conservation ==
Xenorhina parkerorum occurs at elevations of 1,280–2,000 m (4,200–6,560 ft) above sea level. It is uncommon and difficult to find; its specific habitat is unknown, but it is believed to live on the tropical rainforest floor. There are also records from rural gardens and other degraded areas. It presumably breeds by direct development (i.e, there is no free-living larval stage).

Threats to this species are unknown, but it occurs in an area where large tracts of suitable habitat exist; it also appears to adapt to habitat modification. It is present in the Kikori Integrated Conservation and Development Project Area.
