= Dainty frog (disambiguation) =

The dainty frog (Cacosternum) is a genus of frogs in the family Pyxicephalidae found in southern and eastern Africa.

Dainty frog may also refer to:

- Dainty green tree frog (Litoria gracilenta), a frog in the family Hylidae native to eastern Queensland and northeastern New South Wales, Australia
- Dainty nursery frog (Cophixalus exiguus), a frog in the family Microhylidae found in northeast Queensland, Australia
