= McDonald's frog =

Conservation status
- Critically Endangered (IUCN 3.1)

Scientific classification
- Kingdom: Animalia
- Phylum: Chordata
- Class: Amphibia
- Order: Anura
- Family: Microhylidae
- Genus: Cophixalus
- Species: C. mcdonaldi

Binomial name
- Cophixalus mcdonaldi Zweifel, 1985

Species of amphibian

Mcdonald's frog (Cophixalus mcdonaldi) is a species of frog in the family Microhylidae. It is endemic to Australia. Its natural habitat is subtropical or tropical moist lowland forests. It is threatened by habitat loss.
