= Sphenophryne rubra =

Conservation status
- Data Deficient (IUCN 3.1)

Scientific classification
- Kingdom: Animalia
- Phylum: Chordata
- Class: Amphibia
- Order: Anura
- Family: Microhylidae
- Genus: Sphenophryne
- Species: S. rubra

Binomial name
- Sphenophryne rubra (Zweifel, 2000)

Synonyms
- Liophryne rubra Zweifel, 2000

Species of frog

Sphenophryne rubra is a species of frog in the family Microhylidae. It is endemic to New Guinea and is only known from the Kubor and Bismarck Ranges in the New Guinea Highlands, Papua New Guinea. The habitat and ecology of this species, that has been observed from very few specimens, are unknown.
