= Buzzing frog =

Conservation status
- Least Concern (IUCN 3.1)

Scientific classification
- Kingdom: Animalia
- Phylum: Chordata
- Class: Amphibia
- Order: Anura
- Family: Microhylidae
- Genus: Cophixalus
- Species: C. bombiens

Binomial name
- Cophixalus bombiens Zweifel, 1985

Species of amphibian

The buzzing frog (Cophixalus bombiens) is a species of frog in the family Microhylidae. It is endemic to Australia. Its natural habitats are subtropical or tropical moist lowland forests and subtropical or tropical moist montane forests. It is threatened by habitat loss.
