= Alpinoscincus =

Scientific classification
- Kingdom: Animalia
- Phylum: Chordata
- Class: Reptilia
- Order: Squamata
- Family: Scincidae
- Subfamily: Eugongylinae
- Genus: Alpinoscincus; Slavenko, Tamar, Tallowin, Kraus, Allison, Carranza, & Meiri, 2021

Species
- 2, see text.

Genus of reptiles

Alpinoscincus is a genus of skinks in the subfamily Eugongylinae. The genus Alpinoscincus is endemic to New Guinea.

== Species ==
There are 2 species:

- Alpinoscincus alpinus Greer, Allison & Cogger, 2005
- Alpinoscincus subalpinus Greer, Allison & Cogger, 2005

Nota bene: A binomial authority in parentheses indicates that the species was originally described in a genus other than Alpinoscincus.
