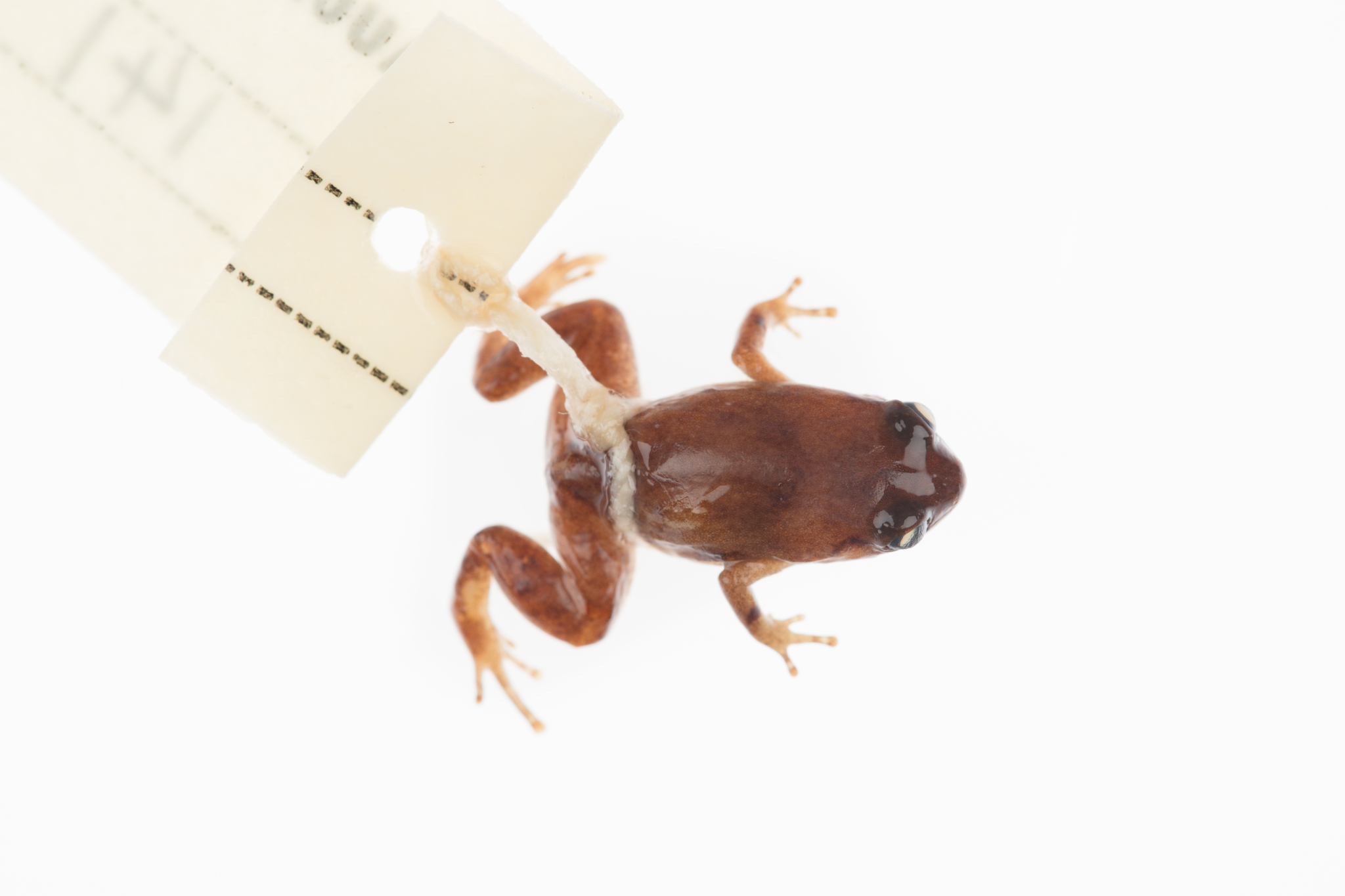

Conservation status
- Endangered (IUCN 3.1)

Scientific classification
- Kingdom: Animalia
- Phylum: Chordata
- Class: Amphibia
- Order: Anura
- Family: Microhylidae
- Genus: Cophixalus
- Species: C. hosmeri

Binomial name
- Cophixalus hosmeri Zweifel, 1985

= Hosmer's frog =

Species of amphibian

Hosmer's frog (Cophixalus hosmeri) is a species of frog in the family Microhylidae. Also known as the Rattling nursery-frog or Pipping nursery-frog, it is endemic to Queensland, Australia. Its natural habitats are subtropical or tropical moist lowland forests and subtropical or tropical moist montane forests. It has previously been threatened by habitat loss but is now endangered.

The female has a snout–vent length of 17 mm (0.67 in).

== Conservation status ==
Cophixalus hosmeri was listed as endangered on the IUCN Red List in 2022. As of July 2019, it was classified as critically endangered under the Australian Environment Protection and Biodiversity Conservation Act 1999.
