= Cophixalus kaindiensis =

Conservation status
- Near Threatened (IUCN 3.1)

Scientific classification
- Kingdom: Animalia
- Phylum: Chordata
- Class: Amphibia
- Order: Anura
- Family: Microhylidae
- Genus: Cophixalus
- Species: C. kaindiensis

Binomial name
- Cophixalus kaindiensis Zweifel, 1979

Species of frog

Cophixalus kaindiensis is a species of frog in the family Microhylidae. It is endemic to Papua New Guinea. Its natural habitat is subtropical or tropical moist montane forests. It is threatened by habitat loss.
