= Hinchinbrook nursery frog =

Scientific classification
- Kingdom: Animalia
- Phylum: Chordata
- Class: Amphibia
- Order: Anura
- Family: Microhylidae
- Genus: Cophixalus
- Species: C. hinchinbrookensis

Binomial name
- Cophixalus hinchinbrookensis Hoskin, 2012

Species of Australian frog

The Hinchinbrook nursery frog (Cophixalus hinchinbrookensis), or Hinchinbrook Island nursery frog, is a species of small rainforest frog that is endemic to Australia.

== Description ==
The species grows up to about 25 mm in length (SVL). Colouration is brown on the back with black or pale yellow markings; the belly is paler, cream or light brown, flecked white. There are dark stripes behind the eyes, a dark W-shaped marking on the upper back and pale yellow spots on the lower back.

== Behaviour ==
The species breeds on land, in spring or summer after rain, with eggs laid in small clusters in nests beneath rocks, logs or vegetation. The nest is guarded by the male. The tadpoles develop entirely within the eggs and hatch as small frogs.

== Distribution and habitat ==
The species is found only on Hinchinbrook Island, a large forested island separated from the tropical north-eastern coast of Queensland by the narrow Hinchinbrook Channel.
