= Sphenophryne magnitympanum =

Scientific classification
- Kingdom: Animalia
- Phylum: Chordata
- Class: Amphibia
- Order: Anura
- Family: Microhylidae
- Genus: Sphenophryne
- Species: S. magnitympanum

Binomial name
- Sphenophryne magnitympanum (Kraus and Allison, 2009)

Synonyms
- Liophryne magnitympanum Kraus and Allison, 2009

Species of frog

Sphenophryne magnitympanum is a species of frog in the family Microhylidae. It is endemic to Papua New Guinea and only known from the vicinity of its type locality on the western slope of Mount Obree, Central Province.

Sphenophryne magnitympanum is only known from the western slope of Mount Obree, Papua New Guinea

== Etymology ==
The specific name magnitympanum is derived from Latin magnus meaning "large" and tympanum meaning "drum", in reference to the large tympanum.

== Description ==
Based on the type series consisting of 14 adult males and a female, males measure 17–27 mm (0.7–1.1 in) and females about 27 mm (1.1 in) in snout–vent length. The snout is gently angulate. The eyes are moderately large. The tympanum is distinct and large. The canthus is rounded but distinct. A pair of angular dermal ridges runs in the scapular region. The fingers have small discs, those of the toes are much larger. No webbing is present. The dorsum is tan, light yellow-brown, or pink brown stippled with black. There is a pair of vague, pale lumbar ocelli. The venter varies from deep, dark yellow to pale yellow. The iris is dark brown.

The male advertisement call is a single-note "boop" lasting about 0.5 seconds. The call is emitted intermittently (maximum three calls per minute, but often only about once per five minutes).

== Habitat and conservation ==
The type series was collected from lower montane rainforest at 1,640–1,840 m (5,380–6,040 ft) above sea level. Males call at night from under leaf litter, or from within shallow burrows in the soil or compacted leaf litter. The species was relatively common, but difficult to collect because of its cryptic habits; a few animals were active on the forest floor at night. As of late 2020, this species has not been assessed for the IUCN Red List of Threatened Species.
