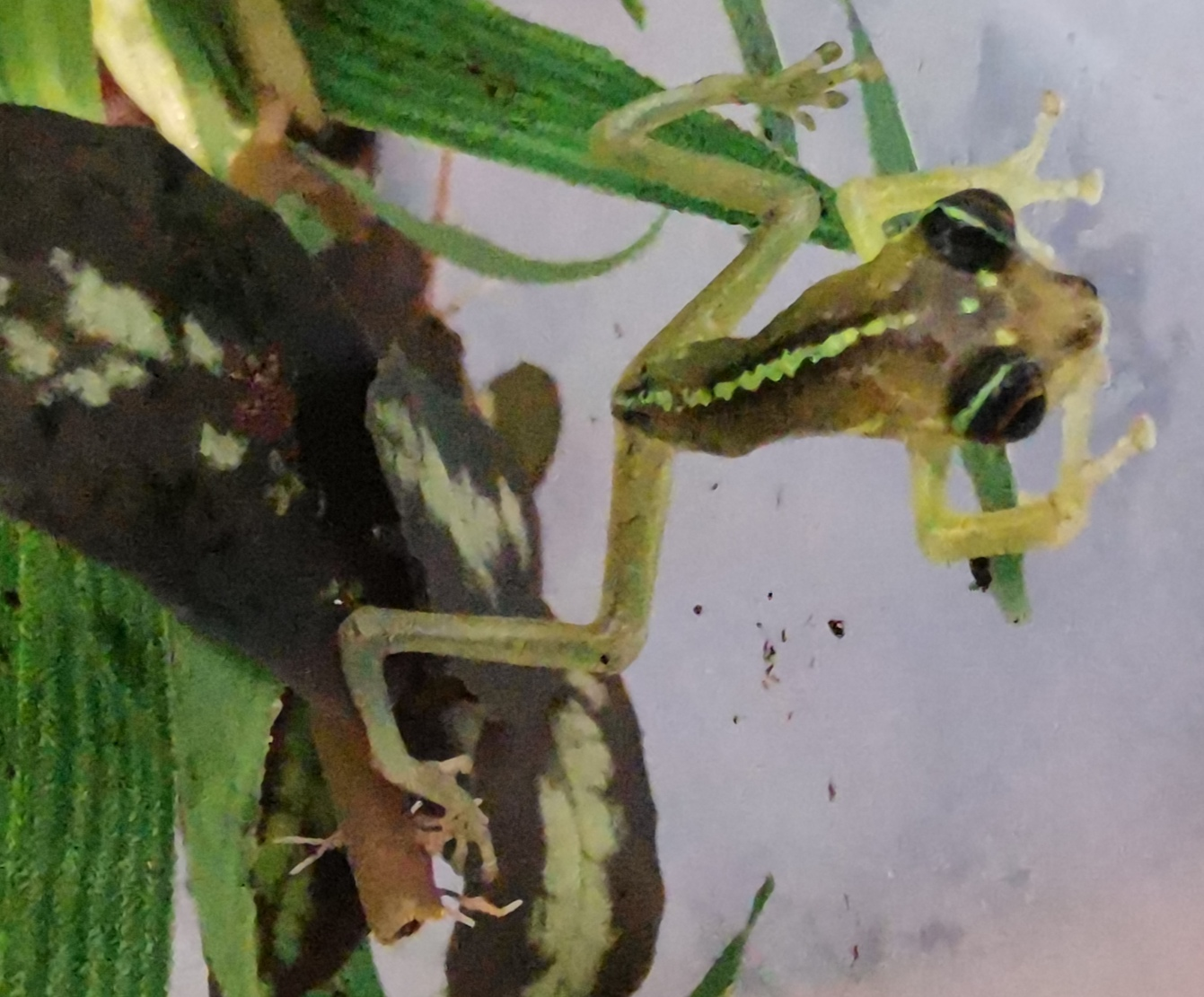

Conservation status
- Least Concern (IUCN 3.1)

Scientific classification
- Kingdom: Animalia
- Phylum: Chordata
- Class: Amphibia
- Order: Anura
- Family: Pelodryadidae
- Genus: Leptobatrachus
- Species: L. thesaurensis

Binomial name
- Leptobatrachus thesaurensis (Peters, 1877)

Synonyms
- Hyla thesaurensis Peters, 1877; Litoria thesaurensis (Peters, 1877); Ranoidea thesaurensis (Peters, 1877)

= Treasury Island tree frog =

Species of amphibian

The Treasury Island tree frog (Leptobatrachus thesaurensis) is a species of frog in the subfamily Pelodryadinae. It is found in New Guinea and the Solomon Islands in subtropical or tropical moist lowland forests, subtropical or tropical moist montane forests, swamps, freshwater marshes, intermittent freshwater marshes, rural gardens, heavily degraded former forests, and canals and ditches.
