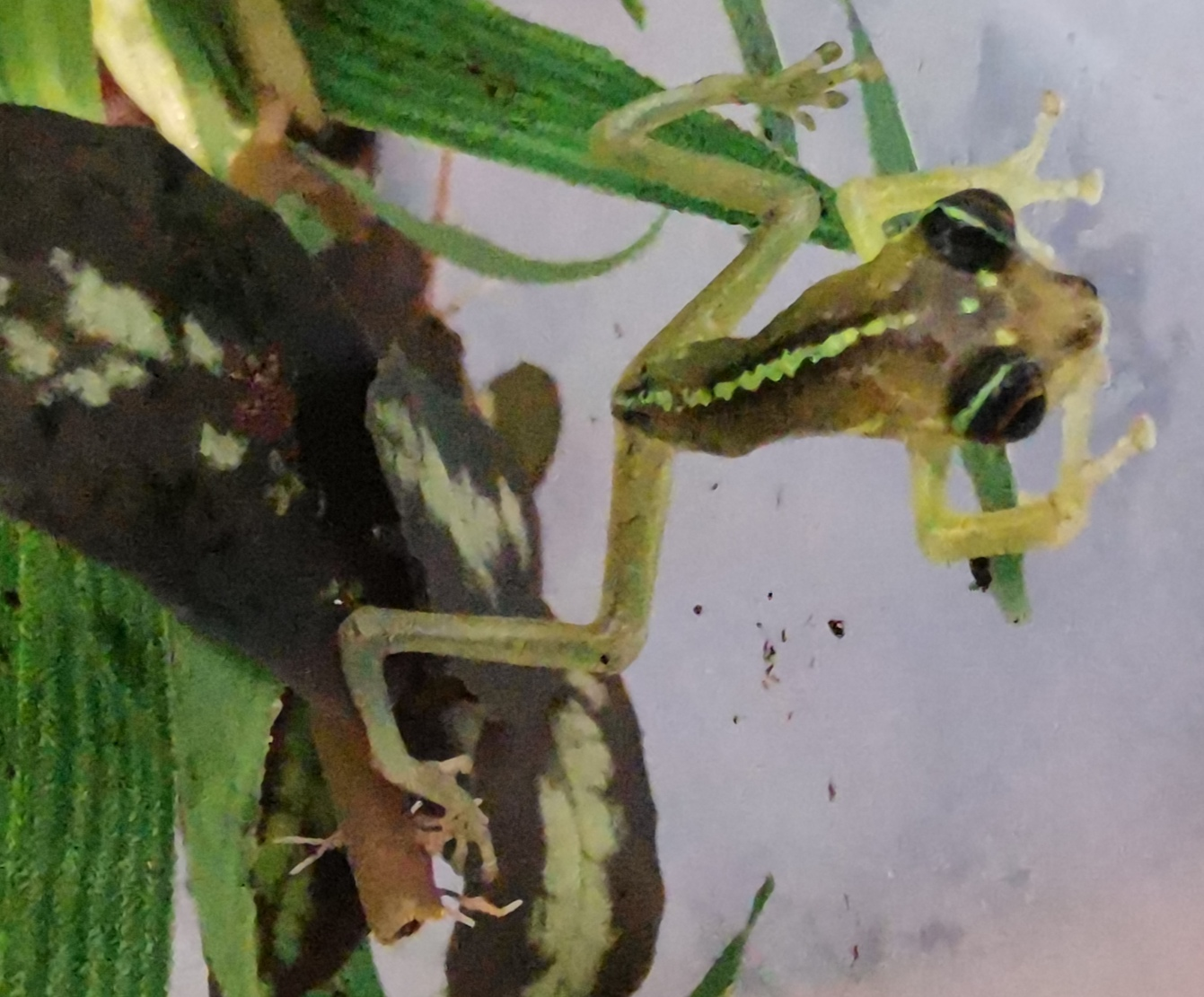
- Leptobatrachus thesaurensis in captivity.

Scientific classification
- Kingdom: Animalia
- Phylum: Chordata
- Class: Amphibia
- Order: Anura
- Family: Pelodryadidae
- Genus: Leptobatrachus; Richards, Donnellan, and Mahony, 2025

Species
- Leptobatrachus flavescens (Kraus and Allison, 2004); Leptobatrachus impurus (Peters and Doria, 1878); Leptobatrachus insularis (Richards and Oliver, 2022); Leptobatrachus luteus (Boulenger, 1887); Leptobatrachus thesaurensis (Peters, 1877)

= Leptobatrachus =

Genus of amphibians

Leptobatrachus is a genus of arboreal frogs in the family Pelodryadidae. These frogs are native to the New Guinea and its surrounding islands, the Bismark Archipelago and Solomon Islands. Species in the genus were previously included within the wastebasket genus Litoria, but were separated into a new genus in 2025. They are small-to-medium sized frogs, and highly variable in colour. The name Leptobatrachus is a hybrid Latin and Greek word meaning slender frog.
