= Leptobatrachus flavescens =

Scientific classification
- Kingdom: Animalia
- Phylum: Chordata
- Class: Amphibia
- Order: Anura
- Family: Pelodryadidae
- Genus: Leptobatrachus
- Species: L. flavescens

Binomial name
- Leptobatrachus flavescens (Kraus & Allison, 2004)

Species of frog

Leptobatrachus flavescens is a species of frog in the family Pelodryadidae. It is endemic to Papua New Guinea.
