= Xenorhina multisica =

Conservation status
- Least Concern (IUCN 3.1)

Scientific classification
- Kingdom: Animalia
- Phylum: Chordata
- Class: Amphibia
- Order: Anura
- Family: Microhylidae
- Genus: Xenorhina
- Species: X. multisica

Binomial name
- Xenorhina multisica (Blum & Menzies, 1989)

Synonyms
- Xenobatrachus multisica Blum & Menzies, 1989

Species of frog

Xenorhina multisica is a species of frog in the family Microhylidae. It is endemic to West Papua, Indonesia. Its natural habitats are subtropical or tropical moist montane forests, subtropical or tropical high-altitude grassland, rural gardens, and heavily degraded former forest.
