= Cophixalus biroi =

Conservation status
- Least Concern (IUCN 3.1)

Scientific classification
- Kingdom: Animalia
- Phylum: Chordata
- Class: Amphibia
- Order: Anura
- Family: Microhylidae
- Genus: Cophixalus
- Species: C. biroi

Binomial name
- Cophixalus biroi (Méhelÿ, 1901)

Species of frog

Cophixalus biroi is a species of frog in the family Microhylidae found in New Guinea. Its natural habitats are subtropical or tropical moist lowland forests and subtropical or tropical moist montane forests.
