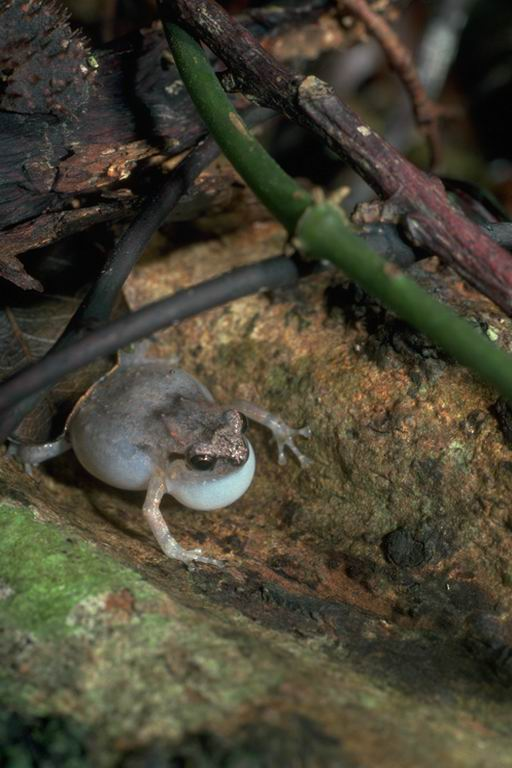

Conservation status
- Least Concern (IUCN 3.1)

Scientific classification
- Kingdom: Animalia
- Phylum: Chordata
- Class: Amphibia
- Order: Anura
- Family: Microhylidae
- Genus: Cophixalus
- Species: C. ornatus

Binomial name
- Cophixalus ornatus (Fry, 1912)

= Cophixalus ornatus =

Species of frog

Cophixalus ornatus, commonly known as the ornate nursery-frog, is a species of frog in the family Microhylidae. It is endemic to north-eastern Queensland, Australia.
