= Allen Allison =

American herpetologist (born 1950)

- Born: 1950
- Education: University of California, Davis
- Known for: Studies of New Guinea herpetofauna, taxon descriptions
- Scientific career
- Fields: Herpetology
- Institutions: Bishop Museum, Hawaii

Allen Allison (born 1950) is an American herpetologist.

He specializes in the herpetofauna of New Guinea. Two taxa are named after him. Allison described first 50 different taxa.

He graduated from the University of California, Davis and has worked at the Bishop Museum in Hawaii since 1983. He served as the Vice President for Science from 1998 to 2012.

== Taxa named in his honor ==
- Choerophryne allisoni Richards & Burton, 2003
- Liophryne allisoni Zweifel, 2000

== Selected taxa described ==
- Albericus exclamitans Kraus & Allison, 2005
- Albericus murritus Kraus & Allison, 2009
- Albericus sanguinopictus Kraus & Allison, 2005
- Austrochaperina septentrionalis Allison & Kraus, 2003
- Callulops eremnosphax Kraus & Allison, 2009
- Callulops marmoratus Kraus & Allison, 2003
- Callulops omnistriatus Kraus & Allison, 2009
- Carlia bomberai Zug & Allison, 2006
- Carlia caesius Zug & Allison, 2006
- Choerophryne longirostris Kraus & Allison, 2001
- Cophixalus bewaniensis Kraus & Allison, 2000
- Cophixalus caverniphilus Kraus & Allison, 2009
- Cophixalus cupricarenus Kraus & Allison, 2009
- Cophixalus desticans Kraus & Allison, 2009
- Cophixalus interruptus Kraus & Allison, 2009
- Cophixalus iovaorum Kraus & Allison, 2009
- Cophixalus kethuk Kraus & Allison, 2009
- Cophixalus linnaeus Kraus & Allison, 2009
- Cophixalus melanops Kraus & Allison, 2009
- Cophixalus phaeobalius Kraus & Allison, 2009
- Cophixalus pulchellus Kraus & Allison, 2000
- Cophixalus sisyphus Kraus & Allison, 2006
- Cophixalus sphagnicola Zweifel & Allison, 1982
- Cophixalus timidus Kraus & Allison, 2006
- Cophixalus tomaiodactylus Kraus & Allison, 2009
- Cophixalus variabilis Kraus & Allison, 2006
- Cyrtodactylus murua Kraus & Allison, 2006
- Emoia guttata Brown & Allison, 1986
- Hylarana waliesa (Kraus & Allison, 2007)
- Hylophorbus proekes Kraus & Allison, 2009
- Liophryne magnitympanum Kraus & Allison, 2009
- Litoria bibonius Kraus & Allison, 2004
- Litoria eschata Kraus & Allison, 2009
- Litoria flavescens Kraus & Allison, 2004
- Litoria rubrops Kraus & Allison, 2004
- Lobulia alpina Greer, Allison & Cogger, 2005
- Lobulia glacialis Greer, Allison & Cogger, 2005
- Lobulia stellaris Greer, Allison & Cogger, 2005
- Lobulia subalpina Greer, Allison & Cogger, 2005
- Mantophryne axanthogaster Kraus & Allison, 2009
- Oreophryne anamiatoi Kraus & Allison, 2009
- Oreophryne ezra Kraus & Allison, 2009
- Paedophryne amauensis Rittmeyer, Allison, Gründler, Thompson & Austin, 2012
- Platymantis browni Allison & Kraus, 2001
- Platymantis bufonulus Kraus & Allison, 2007
- Platymantis caesiops Kraus & Allison, 2009
- Platymantis manus Kraus & Allison, 2009
- Platymantis sulcatus Kraus & Allison, 2007
- Tropidonophis dolasii Kraus & Allison, 2004
- Xenorhina adisca Kraus & Allison, 2003
- Xenorhina arboricola Allison & Kraus, 2000
- Xenorhina zweifeli (Kraus & Allison, 2002)
