= Sphenophryne miniafia =

Scientific classification
- Kingdom: Animalia
- Phylum: Chordata
- Class: Amphibia
- Order: Anura
- Family: Microhylidae
- Genus: Sphenophryne
- Species: S. miniafia

Binomial name
- Sphenophryne miniafia (Kraus, 2014)

Synonyms
- Liophryne miniafia Kraus, 2014

Species of frog

Sphenophryne miniafia is a species of frog in the family Microhylidae. It is endemic to Papua New Guinea. Its natural habitat is mid montane wet forest.

== Description ==
Juveniles of this species have relatively longer snout, larger eyes, and broader heads than adults.
