= Nubeoscincus glacialis =

Conservation status
- Data Deficient (IUCN 3.1)

Scientific classification
- Kingdom: Animalia
- Phylum: Chordata
- Class: Reptilia
- Order: Squamata
- Family: Scincidae
- Genus: Nubeoscincus
- Species: N. glacialis

Binomial name
- Nubeoscincus glacialis (Allen Eddy Greer, Allison, & Cogger, 2005)
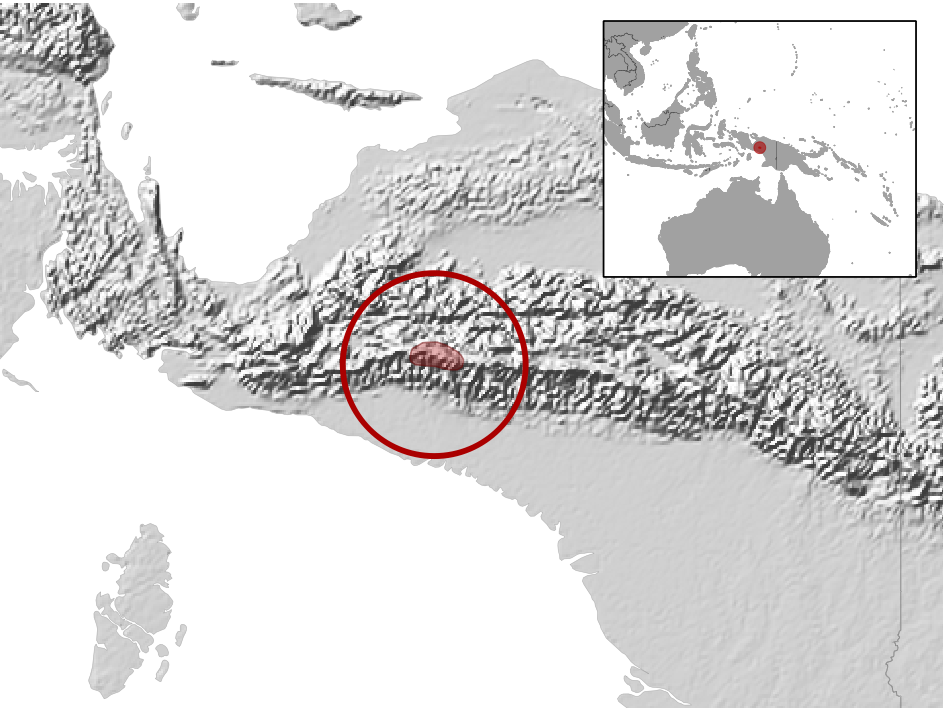

Synonyms
- Lobulia glacialis Greer, Allison, & Cogger, 2005

Species of lizard

Nubeoscincus glacialis is a species of skink. It is endemic to Papua Province, Indonesian New Guinea, where it is known from elevations of 3,510 to 4,050 m (11,520 to 13,290 ft) above sea level. The species was named after the distribution found close to the glacier in an Indonesian mountain range. It was most recently assessed for the IUCN Red List in 2013.
