= Nubeoscincus stellaris =

Conservation status
- Least Concern (IUCN 3.1)

Scientific classification
- Kingdom: Animalia
- Phylum: Chordata
- Class: Reptilia
- Order: Squamata
- Family: Scincidae
- Genus: Nubeoscincus
- Species: N. stellaris

Binomial name
- Nubeoscincus stellaris (Allen Eddy Greer, Allison, & Cogger, 2005)

Synonyms
- Lobulia stellaris Greer, Allison, & Cogger, 2005

Species of lizard

Nubeoscincus stellaris is a species of skink. It is endemic to New Guinea and is known from both Indonesian and Papua New Guinean parts of the island with records from elevations of 3,040 to 3,200 m (9,970 to 10,500 ft) above sea level.
