= Sphenophryne rhododactyla =

Conservation status
- Vulnerable (IUCN 3.1)

Scientific classification
- Kingdom: Animalia
- Phylum: Chordata
- Class: Amphibia
- Order: Anura
- Family: Microhylidae
- Genus: Sphenophryne
- Species: S. rhododactyla

Binomial name
- Sphenophryne rhododactyla (Boulenger, 1897)

Synonyms
- Liophryne rhododactyla Boulenger, 1897

Species of frog

Sphenophryne rhododactyla is a species of frog in the family Microhylidae. It is endemic to Papua New Guinea. Its natural habitat is subtropical or tropical moist montane forests. It is threatened by habitat loss.
