= Xenorhina macrops =

Conservation status
- Least Concern (IUCN 3.1)

Scientific classification
- Kingdom: Animalia
- Phylum: Chordata
- Class: Amphibia
- Order: Anura
- Family: Microhylidae
- Genus: Xenorhina
- Species: X. macrops

Binomial name
- Xenorhina macrops van Kampen, 1913

Synonyms
- Xenobatrachus macrops — van Kampen, 1915

Species of amphibian

Xenorhina macrops is a species of frog in the family Microhylidae. It is endemic to West Papua, Indonesia. Its natural habitat is subtropical or tropical moist montane forests.
