= Sphenophryne allisoni =

Conservation status
- Least Concern (IUCN 3.1)

Scientific classification
- Kingdom: Animalia
- Phylum: Chordata
- Class: Amphibia
- Order: Anura
- Family: Microhylidae
- Genus: Sphenophryne
- Species: S. allisoni

Binomial name
- Sphenophryne allisoni (Zweifel, 2000)

Synonyms
- Liophryne allisoni Zweifel, 2000

Species of frog

Sphenophryne allisoni is a species of frog in the family Microhylidae. It is endemic to Papua New Guinea. Its natural habitat is subtropical or tropical moist montane forests.
