= Faro Island tree frog =

Conservation status
- Least Concern (IUCN 3.1)

Scientific classification
- Kingdom: Animalia
- Phylum: Chordata
- Class: Amphibia
- Order: Anura
- Family: Pelodryadidae
- Genus: Leptobatrachus
- Species: L. luteus

Binomial name
- Leptobatrachus luteus (Boulenger, 1887)

Synonyms
- Hyla lutea Boulenger, 1887; Litoria lutea (Boulenger, 1887); Ranoidea lutea (Boulenger, 1887)

Species of amphibian

The Faro Island tree frog (Leptobatrachus luteus), also known as Solomon Islands treefrog, is a species of frog in the family Pelodryadidae. It is found in Papua New Guinea and Solomon Islands. Its natural habitat is subtropical or tropical moist lowland forests. It is threatened by habitat loss.
