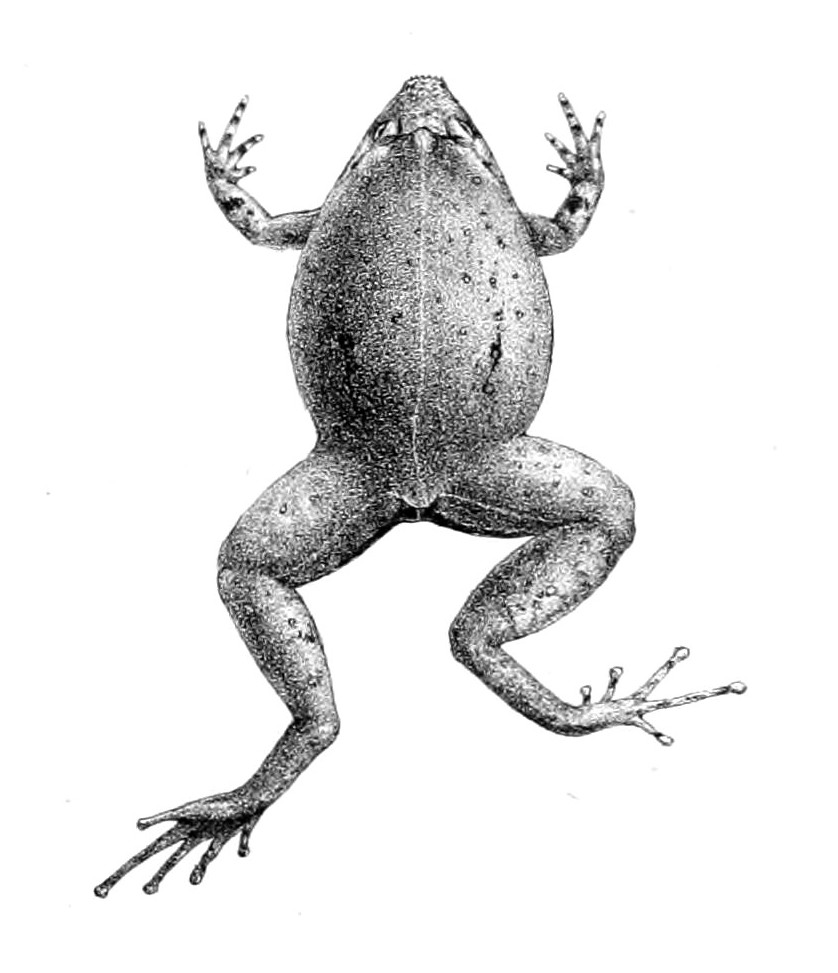

Conservation status
- Least Concern (IUCN 3.1)

Scientific classification
- Kingdom: Animalia
- Phylum: Chordata
- Class: Amphibia
- Order: Anura
- Family: Microhylidae
- Genus: Xenorhina
- Species: X. mehelyi

Binomial name
- Xenorhina mehelyi (Boulenger, 1898)

Synonyms
- Choanacantha mehelyi Boulenger, 1898; Xenobatrachus mehelyi — Zweifel, 1972

= Xenorhina mehelyi =

Species of frog

Xenorhina mehelyi is a species of frog in the family Microhylidae. It is found in Papua New Guinea and possibly Indonesia. Its natural habitats are subtropical or tropical moist lowland forests and subtropical or tropical moist montane forests.
