= Sphenophryne cornuta =

Conservation status
- Least Concern (IUCN 3.1)

Scientific classification
- Kingdom: Animalia
- Phylum: Chordata
- Class: Amphibia
- Order: Anura
- Family: Microhylidae
- Genus: Sphenophryne
- Species: S. cornuta

Binomial name
- Sphenophryne cornuta Peters and Doria, 1878

Synonyms
- Chaperina ceratophthalmus van Kampen, 1909

Species of amphibian

Sphenophryne cornuta is a species of frogs in the family Microhylidae. It is endemic to New Guinea where it is widespread and found both in the Western New Guinea (Indonesia) and Papua New Guinea. Common name horned land frog has been proposed for it.

== Description ==
Adult males measure 28–37 mm (1.1–1.5 in) and females 29–42 mm (1.1–1.7 in) in snout–vent length. Each eyelid bears a small but distinct, pointed tubercle, making this species easy to recognize. The fingers have enlarged discs that are larger than those on the toes. The loreal region is flat and vertical, distinct from the flat upper surface of the pointed snout.

Sphenophryne cornuta breeds by direct development, and the male carries its babies on its back.

== Habitat and conservation ==
Sphenophryne cornuta inhabits tropical rainforests at elevations below 1,500 m (4,900 ft). It hides in leaf litter and under logs during the day, and calls from bushes and saplings in understorey at night. It also lives in disturbed habitats including gardens and degraded forests.

Sphenophryne cornuta is a common and very widespread species. It faces no known threats.
