= Xenorhina anorbis =

Conservation status
- Data Deficient (IUCN 3.1)

Scientific classification
- Kingdom: Animalia
- Phylum: Chordata
- Class: Amphibia
- Order: Anura
- Family: Microhylidae
- Genus: Xenorhina
- Species: X. anorbis

Binomial name
- Xenorhina anorbis (Blum & Menzies, 1989)

Synonyms
- Xenobatrachus anorbis Blum & Menzies, 1989

Species of frog

Xenorhina anorbis is a species of frog in the family Microhylidae. It is found in West Papua in Indonesia and Papua New Guinea. Its natural habitats are subtropical or tropical moist montane forests, swamps, and rural gardens. It is threatened by habitat loss.
