= Xenorhina eiponis =

Conservation status
- Data Deficient (IUCN 3.1)

Scientific classification
- Kingdom: Animalia
- Phylum: Chordata
- Class: Amphibia
- Order: Anura
- Family: Microhylidae
- Genus: Xenorhina
- Species: X. eiponis

Binomial name
- Xenorhina eiponis Blum & Menzies, 1989

Species of frog

Xenorhina eiponis is a species of frog in the family Microhylidae. It is endemic to West Papua, Indonesia. Its natural habitats are subtropical or tropical moist montane forests and rural gardens.
