= Sphenophryne schlaginhaufeni =

Conservation status
- Least Concern (IUCN 3.1)

Scientific classification
- Kingdom: Animalia
- Phylum: Chordata
- Class: Amphibia
- Order: Anura
- Family: Microhylidae
- Genus: Sphenophryne
- Species: S. schlaginhaufeni

Binomial name
- Sphenophryne schlaginhaufeni Wandollek, 1911

Synonyms
- Liophryne schlaginhaufeni (Wandollek, 1911)

Species of frog

Sphenophryne schlaginhaufeni is a species of frog in the family Microhylidae. It is found in New Guinea.

Its natural habitats are subtropical or tropical moist lowland forests and subtropical or tropical moist montane forests.

As part of its mating habits, the male excretes a hormone on an unsuspecting female, rendering it unconscious before copulation.
