= Xenorhina bidens =

Conservation status
- Least Concern (IUCN 3.1)

Scientific classification
- Kingdom: Animalia
- Phylum: Chordata
- Class: Amphibia
- Order: Anura
- Family: Microhylidae
- Genus: Xenorhina
- Species: X. bidens

Binomial name
- Xenorhina bidens Van Kampen, 1909

Synonyms
- Xenobatrachus bidens (Van Kampen, 1909)

Species of frog

Xenorhina bidens is a species of frog in the family Microhylidae. It is endemic to New Guinea and found between Lorentz River in the west and Fly River in the east, thus being present in both West Papua (Indonesia) and Papua New Guinea. Common name Digul River fanged frog has been coined for it, in reference to Digul River where the type series was collected in 1904 or 1905.

== Description ==
Adult females grow to at least 29 mm (1.1 in) in snout–vent length. The body is stout. The head is moderately narrow but broader than it is long. The snout is pointed and projecting, with slightly warty point; skin is smooth elsewhere. The eyes are small. The tympanum is visible. The fingers have no discs but the toes are slightly dilated terminally and could be interpreted as having small discs. Colouration is brown above, with some patterning: a few darker markings on the back and legs, and some mottling in the upper lip. A light vertebral stripe may also be present. The ventral surfaces are mottled with dark and light brown.

== Habitat and conservation ==
There is little specific information about ecology of this species, but its natural habitat is presumably lowland rainforest where it lives on the forest floor, probably at elevations of no more than 500 m (1,600 ft). The diet includes ants.

Threats to this species are unknown. It is also unknown whether it is present in any protected areas.
