= Xenorhina arfakiana =

Conservation status
- Least Concern (IUCN 3.1)

Scientific classification
- Kingdom: Animalia
- Phylum: Chordata
- Class: Amphibia
- Order: Anura
- Family: Microhylidae
- Genus: Xenorhina
- Species: X. arfakiana

Binomial name
- Xenorhina arfakiana (Blum & Menzies, 1989)

Synonyms
- Xenobatrachus arfakianus Blum & Menzies, 1989

Species of frog

Xenorhina arfakiana is a species of frog in the family Microhylidae. It is endemic to West Papua, Indonesia. Its natural habitat is subtropical or tropical moist montane forests.
