= Cophixalus cheesmanae =

Conservation status
- Least Concern (IUCN 3.1)

Scientific classification
- Kingdom: Animalia
- Phylum: Chordata
- Class: Amphibia
- Order: Anura
- Family: Microhylidae
- Genus: Cophixalus
- Species: C. cheesmanae

Binomial name
- Cophixalus cheesmanae Parker, 1934

Species of frog

Cophixalus cheesmanae is a species of frog in the family Microhylidae. It is endemic to Papua New Guinea. Its natural habitats are subtropical or tropical moist lowland forests and subtropical or tropical moist montane forests.
