= Xenorhina schiefenhoeveli =

Conservation status
- Least Concern (IUCN 3.1)

Scientific classification
- Kingdom: Animalia
- Phylum: Chordata
- Class: Amphibia
- Order: Anura
- Family: Microhylidae
- Genus: Xenorhina
- Species: X. schiefenhoeveli

Binomial name
- Xenorhina schiefenhoeveli (Blum & Menzies, 1989)

Synonyms
- Xenobatrachus schiefenhoeveli Blum & Menzies, 1989

Species of frog

Xenorhina schiefenhoeveli is a species of frog in the family Microhylidae. It is endemic to West Papua, Indonesia. Its natural habitats are rocky areas, pastureland, and rural gardens.

== Sources ==
- IUCN SSC Amphibian Specialist Group (2020). "Xenorhina ocellata". IUCN Red List of Threatened Species. 2020 e.T58034A152554335. doi:10.2305/IUCN.UK.2020-3.RLTS.T58034A152554335.en.
