= Xenorhina ocellata =

Conservation status
- Least Concern (IUCN 3.1)

Scientific classification
- Kingdom: Animalia
- Phylum: Chordata
- Class: Amphibia
- Order: Anura
- Family: Microhylidae
- Genus: Xenorhina
- Species: X. ocellata

Binomial name
- Xenorhina ocellata van Kampen, 1913

Synonyms
- Xenobatrachus ocellatus — van Kampen, 1919

Species of frog

Xenorhina ocellata is a species of frog in the family Microhylidae. It is endemic to West Papua, Indonesia. Its natural habitat is subtropical or tropical moist montane forests.
