= Xenorhina subcrocea =

Conservation status
- Data Deficient (IUCN 3.1)

Scientific classification
- Kingdom: Animalia
- Phylum: Chordata
- Class: Amphibia
- Order: Anura
- Family: Microhylidae
- Genus: Xenorhina
- Species: X. subcrocea

Binomial name
- Xenorhina subcrocea (Menzies and Tyler, 1977)

Synonyms
- Xenobatrachus subcroceus Menzies and Tyler, 1977

Species of frog

Xenorhina subcrocea is a species of frog in the family Microhylidae. It is endemic to Papua New Guinea and is known from the New Guinean north coast, including coastal ranges between Vanimo and Lae. Common name Lae fanged frog has been coined for it.

== Description ==
Adult males in the type series measure 31–33 mm (1.2–1.3 in) and the sole female 32 mm (1.3 in) in snout–vent length. The body is obese. The head tapers evenly to the smoothly pointed snout. The eyes are small. The tympanum is visible and relatively large but not very distinct. The fingers have no discs whereas the toes have very small, slightly grooved discs. The legs are relatively long. Skin is warty on the flanks but smooth or warty elsewhere, depending on the specimen. Dorsal colouration is variable, from light greyish or light brown to dark brown with vague dark mottling. The colouring becomes paler on the flanks. The ventral surfaces are white with dark brown and orange reticulation.

The male advertisement call is a series of approximately 15 clear notes lasting about 0.06 seconds each, with pauses of 0.15 seconds. The call gives an overall impression of very clear, low-pitched piping.

== Habitat and conservation ==
Xenorhina subcrocea occurs beneath leaf-litter in rainforests at elevations below 1,000 m (3,300 ft). All the males in the type series were located by their calling and then excavated from beneath the leaf litter from holes or open spaces among plant roots. The female type was found incidentally when searching below the leaf litter. Reproduction is through direct development (no free-living larval stage).

The forest at the type locality has been destroyed by infrastructure development, but intact habitat remains nearby. This species might be able to adapt to degraded habitats. It is not known to occur in any protected areas.
