= Xenorhina tumulus =

Conservation status
- Least Concern (IUCN 3.1)

Scientific classification
- Kingdom: Animalia
- Phylum: Chordata
- Class: Amphibia
- Order: Anura
- Family: Microhylidae
- Genus: Xenorhina
- Species: X. tumulus

Binomial name
- Xenorhina tumulus (Blum & Menzies, 1989)

Synonyms
- Xenobatrachus tumulus Blum & Menzies, 1989

Species of frog

Xenorhina tumulus is a species of frog in the family Microhylidae. It is endemic to Papua New Guinea. Its natural habitats are subtropical or tropical moist montane forests, rural gardens, and heavily degraded former forest.
