= Xenorhina ophiodon =

Conservation status
- Data Deficient (IUCN 3.1)

Scientific classification
- Kingdom: Animalia
- Phylum: Chordata
- Class: Amphibia
- Order: Anura
- Family: Microhylidae
- Genus: Xenorhina
- Species: X. ophiodon

Binomial name
- Xenorhina ophiodon (Peters & Doria, 1878)

Synonyms
- Xenobatrachus ophiodon Peters & Doria, 1878

Species of frog

Xenorhina ophiodon is a species of frog in the family Microhylidae. It is endemic to West Papua, Indonesia. Its natural habitat is subtropical or tropical moist montane forests. It is threatened by habitat loss.
