= Southern New Guinea tree frog =

Conservation status
- Least Concern (IUCN 3.1)

Scientific classification
- Kingdom: Animalia
- Phylum: Chordata
- Class: Amphibia
- Order: Anura
- Family: Pelodryadidae
- Genus: Leptobatrachus
- Species: L. impurus

Binomial name
- Leptobatrachus impurus (Peters & Doria, 1878)

Synonyms
- Litoria impura (Peters & Doria, 1878); Ranoidea impura

Species of amphibian

The southern New Guinea tree frog (Leptobatrachus impurus) is a species of frog in the family Pelodryadidae. It is endemic to the Bird's Tail Peninsula. Its natural habitats are moist savanna, freshwater marshes, and intermittent freshwater marshes.
