= Xenorhina fuscigula =

Conservation status
- Least Concern (IUCN 3.1)

Scientific classification
- Kingdom: Animalia
- Phylum: Chordata
- Class: Amphibia
- Order: Anura
- Family: Microhylidae
- Genus: Xenorhina
- Species: X. fuscigula

Binomial name
- Xenorhina fuscigula (Blum & Menzies, 1989)

Synonyms
- Xenobatrachus fuscigula Blum & Menzies, 1989

Species of frog

Xenorhina fuscigula is a species of frog in the family Microhylidae. It is endemic to Papua New Guinea. Its natural habitats are subtropical or tropical moist montane forests and rural gardens.
