= Cophixalus tetzlaffi =

Conservation status
- Data Deficient (IUCN 3.1)

Scientific classification
- Kingdom: Animalia
- Phylum: Chordata
- Class: Amphibia
- Order: Anura
- Family: Microhylidae
- Genus: Cophixalus
- Species: C. tetzlaffi

Binomial name
- Cophixalus tetzlaffi Günther, 2003

Species of amphibian

Cophixalus tetzlaffi is a species of frogs in the family Microhylidae. It is endemic to West Papua, Indonesia, where it is only known from near its type locality, Fakfak Mountains near the town of Fakfak.

== Etymology ==
The specific name tetzlaffi honours Immo Tetzlaff, whom Günther, the scientist who described the species, thanks for help in both New Guinea and Germany.

== Description ==
Cophixalus tetzlaffi are small frogs, though medium-sized among Cophixalus: adult males measure 20–22 mm (0.79–0.87 in) in snout–vent length. Head is broader than long, and males have a large vocal sac. Ground colour is yellowish-grey during day, getting light grey at night. There are conspicuous blackish dorsolateral stripes, and a cream-coloured stripe running from tip of the snout to the anus.

Cophixalus tetzlaffi is only known from the Fakfak Mountains, West Papua, Indonesia.

== Habitat and conservation ==
The type locality is tropical primary forest at an elevation of 860 m (2,820 ft) above sea level. Males were found perched on herbaceous vegetation, shrubs, and leaf litter. The species can attain locally high densities.

As it is not known whether the species can adapt to secondary habitats, it is potentially threatened by habitat loss caused by logging and establishment of plantations.
