= Rattling frog =

Conservation status
- Least Concern (IUCN 3.1)

Scientific classification
- Kingdom: Animalia
- Phylum: Chordata
- Class: Amphibia
- Order: Anura
- Family: Microhylidae
- Genus: Cophixalus
- Species: C. crepitans

Binomial name
- Cophixalus crepitans Zweifel, 1985

Species of amphibian

The rattling frog (Cophixalus crepitans) is a species of frog in the family Microhylidae. It is endemic to Australia. Its natural habitat is subtropical or tropical moist lowland forests. It is threatened by habitat loss.
