= Cophixalus linnaeus =

Conservation status
- Least Concern (IUCN 3.1)

Scientific classification
- Kingdom: Animalia
- Phylum: Chordata
- Class: Amphibia
- Order: Anura
- Family: Microhylidae
- Genus: Cophixalus
- Species: C. linnaeus

Binomial name
- Cophixalus linnaeus Kraus and Allison, 2009

Species of amphibian

Cophixalus linnaeus is a species of frog in the family Microhylidae, the binomial honours Swedish botanist Carl Linnaeus. It is found in New Guinea.
