= Southern ornate nursery frog =

Scientific classification
- Kingdom: Animalia
- Phylum: Chordata
- Class: Amphibia
- Order: Anura
- Family: Microhylidae
- Genus: Cophixalus
- Species: C. australis

Binomial name
- Cophixalus australis Hoskin, 2012

Species of Australian frog

The southern ornate nursery frog (Cophixalus australis) is a species of small rainforest frog that is endemic to Australia.

== Description ==
The species grows up to about 30 mm in length (SVL). Colouration varies through cream, grey and brown, with paler underparts. There are dark stripes through the eyes, a dark W-shaped marking on the upper back and yellow spots on the lower back.

== Behaviour ==
The species breeds on land, in spring or summer after rain, with eggs laid in small clusters in nests among rocks, in soil burrows or beneath leaf litter. The nest is guarded by the male. The tadpoles develop entirely within the eggs and hatch as small frogs.

== Distribution and habitat ==
The species’ distribution is restricted to the Wet Tropics of Queensland in north-eastern Australia, where it has been recorded from the area encompassing the southern Atherton Tableland, Mount Bellenden Ker, Mount Bartle Frere, Tully and Innisfail.
