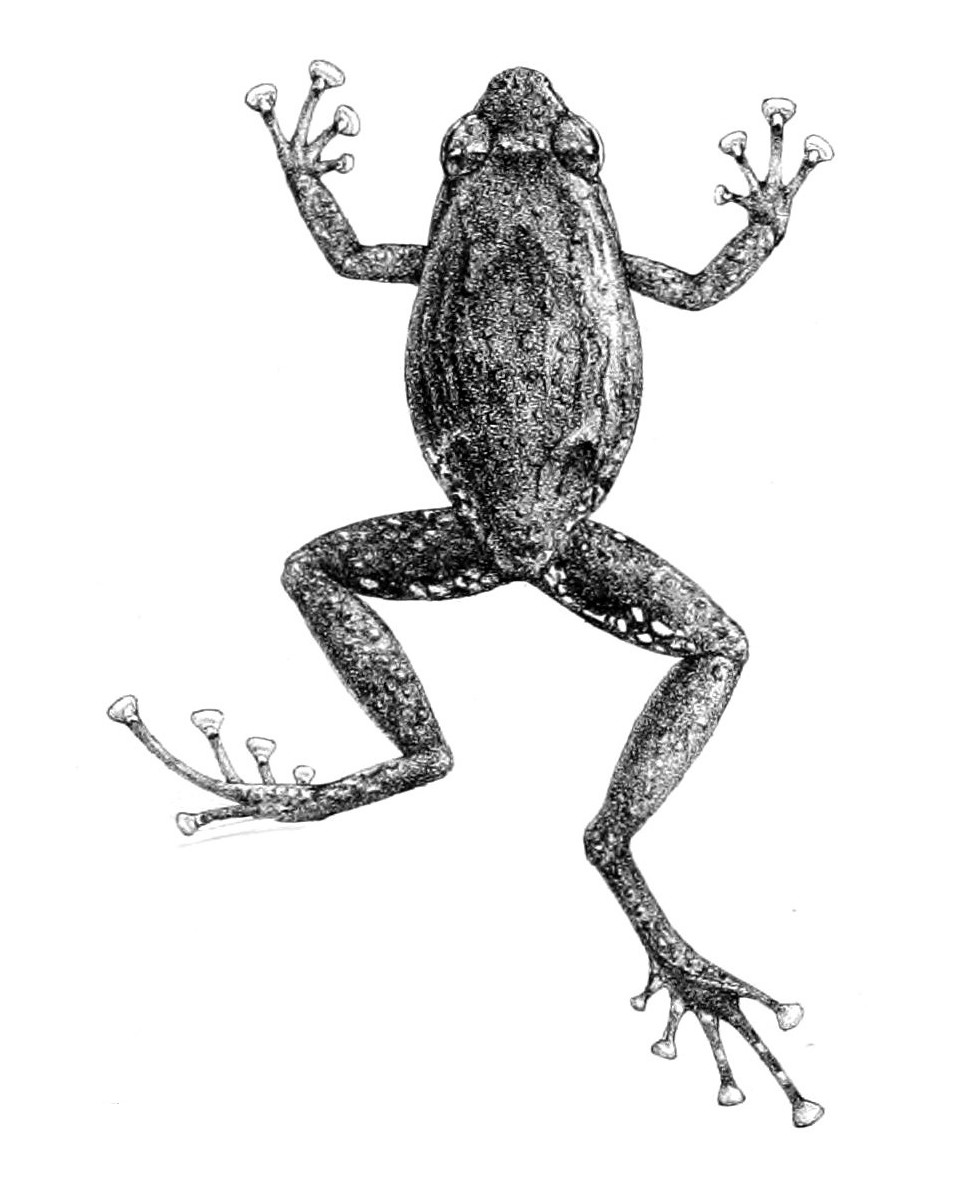

Conservation status
- Least Concern (IUCN 3.1)

Scientific classification
- Kingdom: Animalia
- Phylum: Chordata
- Class: Amphibia
- Order: Anura
- Family: Microhylidae
- Genus: Cophixalus
- Species: C. verrucosus

Binomial name
- Cophixalus verrucosus (Boulenger, 1898)

Synonyms
- Cophixalus aimbensis Hiaso, 2002

= Cophixalus verrucosus =

Species of frog

Cophixalus verrucosus (common name: Moroke rainforest frog) is a species of frog in the family Microhylidae. It is endemic to Papua New Guinea. Its natural habitats are tropical moist lowland forests, moist montane forests, and heavily degraded former forest.
