= Songs of Disappearance =

- Website: songsofdisappearance.com

Songs of Disappearance is a series of albums by Bowerbird Collective.

== Discography ==
List of albums, with selected chart positions
Title	Album details	Peak chart positions
Title	Album details	AUS
Australian Bird Calls	Released: 3 December 2021; Format: digital, CD; Label: Bowerbird Collective	2
Australian Frog Calls	Released: 2 December 2022; Format: digital, CD; Label: Bowerbird Collective	3
Australian Mammal Calls	Released: 1 December 2023; Format: digital, CD; Label: Bowerbird Collective	— (Note: Australian Mammal Calls did not enter the ARIA Top 100 Albums Chart, but peaked at number 5 on the Australian Artists Album Chart.)

== Awards and nominations ==
=== ARIA Music Awards ===
The ARIA Music Awards is an annual award ceremony event celebrating the Australian music industry.

Year	Nominee / work	Award	Result	Ref.
2023	Australian Frog Calls	Best World Music Album	Nominated	
