= Alpinoscincus subalpinus =

Conservation status
- Least Concern (IUCN 3.1)

Scientific classification
- Kingdom: Animalia
- Phylum: Chordata
- Class: Reptilia
- Order: Squamata
- Family: Scincidae
- Subfamily: Eugongylinae
- Genus: Alpinoscincus
- Species: A. subalpinus

Binomial name
- Alpinoscincus subalpinus Greer, Allison, & Cogger, 2005

Synonyms
- Lobulia subalpina

Species of lizard

Alpinoscincus subalpinus is a species of skink found in Papua New Guinea.
