= Golden-capped boulder frog =

Scientific classification
- Kingdom: Animalia
- Phylum: Chordata
- Class: Amphibia
- Order: Anura
- Family: Microhylidae
- Genus: Cophixalus
- Species: C. pakayakulangun

Binomial name
- Cophixalus pakayakulangun Hoskin & Aland, 2011

Species of Australian frog

The golden-capped boulder frog (Cophixalus pakayakulangun) is a species of rainforest frog that is endemic to Australia.

== Etymology ==
The specific epithet pakayakulangun has the approximate meaning of ‘belonging among the boulders’, from a local term in Kuuku Ya’u, a language of the Pakadji, or Sandbeach People, of eastern Cape York.

== Description ==
The species grows up to about 55 mm in length (SVL). Colouration is grey or brown on the back; the belly is pale grey; there is often a yellow patch over the snout and eyelids. There are dark stripes from the snout to behind the eyes; the groin and backs of the thighs are pale orange-pink. The fingers and toes are unwebbed.

== Behaviour ==
The frogs feed primarily on ants.

== Distribution and habitat ==
The species is only known from the type locality, just south of Stanley Hill and north of the Pascoe River, on the Cape York Peninsula of tropical Far North Queensland. There the frogs inhabit deeply piled granite boulder fields festooned with tropical rainforest vegetation.
