= Xenorhina gigantea =

Conservation status
- Data Deficient (IUCN 3.1)

Scientific classification
- Kingdom: Animalia
- Phylum: Chordata
- Class: Amphibia
- Order: Anura
- Family: Microhylidae
- Genus: Xenorhina
- Species: X. gigantea

Binomial name
- Xenorhina gigantea van Kampen, 1915

Synonyms
- Xenobatrachus gigantea — van Kampen, 1915

Species of frog

Xenorhina gigantea is a species of frog in the family Microhylidae. It is endemic to Indonesia. Its natural habitats are subtropical or tropical moist montane forests and subtropical or tropical high-altitude grassland. It is threatened by habitat loss.
