= Cophixalus pulchellus =

Conservation status
- Data Deficient (IUCN 3.1)

Scientific classification
- Kingdom: Animalia
- Phylum: Chordata
- Class: Amphibia
- Order: Anura
- Family: Microhylidae
- Genus: Cophixalus
- Species: C. pulchellus

Binomial name
- Cophixalus pulchellus Kraus and Allison, 2000
- Cophixalus pulchellus is only known from Mount Hunstein in Papua New Guinea

Species of frog

Cophixalus pulchellus is a species of frog in the family Microhylidae. It is endemic to mainland Papua New Guinea and only known from its type locality in the Hunstein Mountains (East Sepik Province); a northern offshoot of the Central Dividing Range. The specific name pulchellus is diminutive of Latin pulcher, meaning "beautiful".

== Description ==
The only known specimen, the holotype, is an adult female measuring 19 mm (0.7 in) in snout–vent length. The snout is truncate. The tympanum is partly distinct. The eyes are moderately large. The fingers and the toes bear discs, but the one on the first finger is very reduced. No webbing is present. The dorsum has yellowish-grey ground color and is decorated with black blotches. The area between the eyes is yellowish.

== Habitat and conservation ==
The holotype was collected from shrubs in closed-canopy rainforest at 1,000 m (3,300 ft) above sea level. It has been classified in 2004 as "data deficient" on the IUCN Red List because it was only recently discovered, and there was very little information on the extent of its occurrence, status, and ecological requirements. Its population trend was unknown at its last assessment. Its population is known only from a single, discovered specimen. There are no known threats to this species, and its location probably safe from human disturbance at the time.
