= Cophixalus montanus =

Conservation status
- Data Deficient (IUCN 3.1)

Scientific classification
- Kingdom: Animalia
- Phylum: Chordata
- Class: Amphibia
- Order: Anura
- Family: Microhylidae
- Genus: Cophixalus
- Species: C. montanus

Binomial name
- Cophixalus montanus (Boettger, 1895)

Synonyms
- Phrynixalus montanus Boettger, 1895

Species of frog

Cophixalus montanus is a species of frog in the family Microhylidae. It is endemic to Halmahera in the Maluku Islands, Indonesia; record from New Guinea was based on misidentification.

Its natural habitat is unknown but presumably is rainforest.
