= Kutini boulder frog =

Conservation status
- Least Concern (IUCN 3.1)

Scientific classification
- Kingdom: Animalia
- Phylum: Chordata
- Class: Amphibia
- Order: Anura
- Family: Microhylidae
- Genus: Cophixalus
- Species: C. kulakula

Binomial name
- Cophixalus kulakula Hoskin & Aland, 2011
- Approximate distribution (Northeastern Australia) Range

Species of Australian frog

The Kutini boulder frog (Cophixalus kulakula) is a species of rainforest frog that is endemic to Australia.

== Etymology ==
The specific epithet kulakula comes from the local term meaning ‘rocky place’ in Kuuku Ya’u, a language of the Pakadji, or Sandbeach People, of eastern Cape York.

== Description ==
The species grows up to about 50 mm in length (SVL). Colouration is grey or brown on the back; the belly is pale grey. There are dark stripes from the snout to behind the eyes; the groin and backs of the thighs are orange-red. The fingers and toes are unwebbed.

== Behaviour ==
The frogs feed primarily on ants. They breed on land, in summer after rain, with eggs laid in small clusters in nests beneath boulders. The nest is guarded by the male. The tadpoles develop entirely within the eggs and hatch as small frogs.

== Distribution and habitat ==
The species is found only in the vicinity of Mount Tozer in the Iron Range area of the Cape York Peninsula of Far North Queensland. The frogs inhabit boulder fields or piles of granite rocks in tropical rainforest gullies.
