= Xenorhina adisca =

Conservation status
- Data Deficient (IUCN 3.1)

Scientific classification
- Kingdom: Animalia
- Phylum: Chordata
- Class: Amphibia
- Order: Anura
- Family: Microhylidae
- Genus: Xenorhina
- Species: X. adisca

Binomial name
- Xenorhina adisca Kraus and Allison, 2003

Species of amphibian

Xenorhina adisca is a species of frogs in the family Microhylidae. It is endemic to West Papua, Indonesia. It is only known from its type locality, Tembagapura, in the Sudirman Range. The specific name adisca refers to the absence of digital discs, a defining feature of the species.

Type locality of Xenorhina adisca in the Sudirman Range of New Guinea

== Description ==
This species is only known from the type series consisting of two females and a juvenile of unknown sex. The adult females measured 23.5–23.6 mm (0.93–0.93 in) and the juvenile 18.8 mm (0.74 in) in snout–vent length. The head is moderately wide. The dorsum is dark brown and the venter bright red; dorsal and lateral surfaces have scattered low and rounded tubercles. The fingers and toes are unwebbed and lack digital discs.

== Habitat and conservation ==
Xenorhina adisca is known from a very mossy montane closed-canopy forest at an elevation of 2,200 m (7,200 ft) above sea level. The site is a steep, south-west facing slope drained by a small stream. Xenorhina adisca is fossorial, and the types were collected from within the surface litter during the day. No threats to this species are known.
