= Sphenophryne =

Scientific classification
- Kingdom: Animalia
- Phylum: Chordata
- Class: Amphibia
- Order: Anura
- Family: Microhylidae
- Subfamily: Asterophryinae
- Genus: Sphenophryne; Peters and Doria, 1878

Type species
- Sphenophryne cornuta Peters and Doria, 1878

Synonyms
- Genyophryne Boulenger, 1890; Liophryne Boulenger, 1897; Oxydactyla van Kampen, 1913

Genus of amphibians

Sphenophryne is a genus of frogs in the family Microhylidae from New Guinea. It reached its current composition in 2017 when Rivera and colleagues brought the genera Genyophryne, Liophryne, and Oxydactyla into synonymy of the then-monotypic Sphenophryne. However, the AmphibiaWeb continues to recognize these genera as valid.

== Species ==
There are 14 species:

- Sphenophryne allisoni (Zweifel, 2000)
- Sphenophryne brevicrus (Van Kampen, 1913)
- Sphenophryne coggeri (Zweifel, 2000)
- Sphenophryne cornuta Peters and Doria, 1878
- Sphenophryne crassa Zweifel, 1956
- Sphenophryne dentata Tyler and Menzies, 1971
- Sphenophryne magnitympanum (Kraus and Allison, 2009)
- Sphenophryne miniafia (Kraus, 2014)
- Sphenophryne rhododactyla (Boulenger, 1897)
- Sphenophryne rubra (Zweifel, 2000)
- Sphenophryne schlaginhaufeni Wandolleck, 1911
- Sphenophryne similis (Zweifel, 2000)
- Sphenophryne stenodactyla (Zweifel, 2000)
- Sphenophryne thomsoni (Boulenger, 1890)
