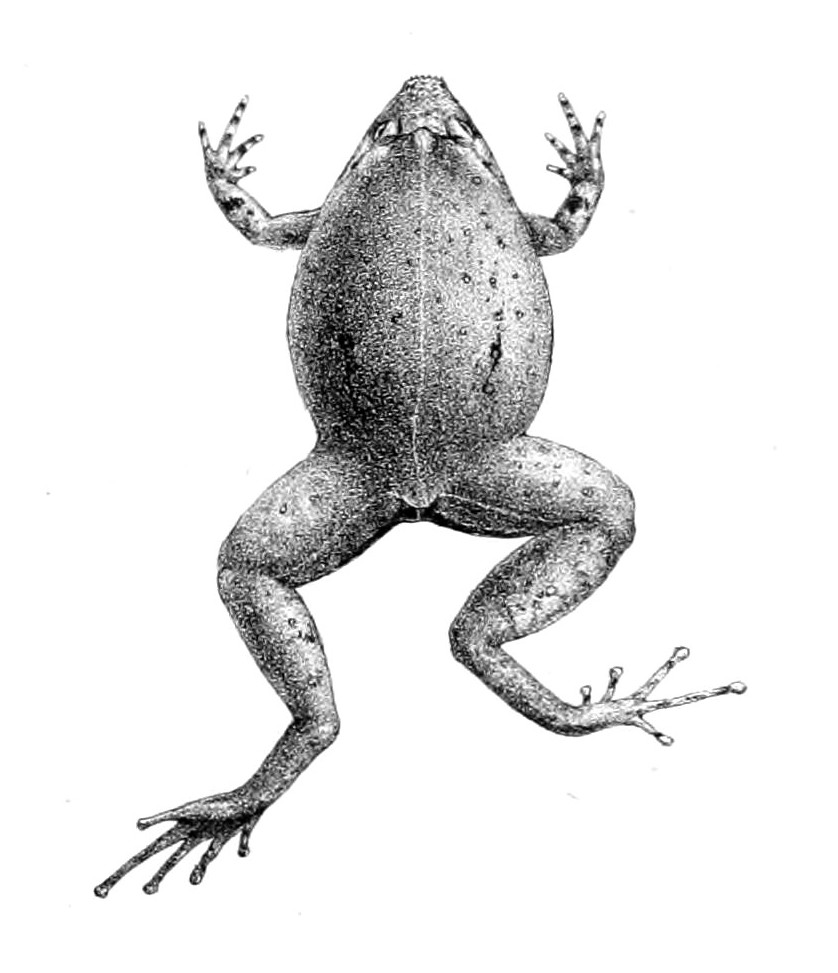
- Xenorhina mehelyi

Scientific classification
- Kingdom: Animalia
- Phylum: Chordata
- Class: Amphibia
- Order: Anura
- Family: Microhylidae
- Subfamily: Asterophryinae
- Genus: Xenorhina; Peters, 1863

Type species
- Bombinator oxycephalus Schlegel, 1858

Species
- 40 species (see text)

Synonyms
- Xenobatrachus Peters and Doria, 1878; Choanacantha Méhely, 1898; Pseudengystoma De Witte, 1930 "1929"

= Xenorhina =

Genus of amphibians

Xenorhina is a genus of microhylid frogs. The genus is endemic to New Guinea. They are sometimes known as the snouted frogs or fanged frogs, the latter referring to the now-synonymized genus Xenobatrachus.

== Species ==
There are 40 species:

- Xenorhina adisca Kraus and Allison, 2003
- Xenorhina anorbis (Blum and Menzies, 1989)
- Xenorhina arboricola Allison and Kraus, 2000
- Xenorhina arfakiana (Blum and Menzies, 1989)
- Xenorhina arndti Günther, 2010
- Xenorhina bidens Van Kampen, 1909
- Xenorhina bouwensi (De Witte, 1930)
- Xenorhina brachyrhyncha Kraus, 2011
- Xenorhina eiponis Blum and Menzies, 1989
- Xenorhina fuscigula (Blum and Menzies, 1989)
- Xenorhina gigantea Van Kampen, 1915
- Xenorhina huon (Blum and Menzies, 1989)
- Xenorhina lacrimosa Günther and Richards, 2021
- Xenorhina lanthanites (Günther and Knop, 2006)
- Xenorhina macrodisca Günther and Richards, 2005
- Xenorhina macrops Van Kampen, 1913
- Xenorhina mehelyi (Boulenger, 1898)
- Xenorhina minima (Parker, 1934)
- Xenorhina multisica (Blum and Menzies, 1989)
- Xenorhina obesa (Zweifel, 1960)
- Xenorhina ocellata Van Kampen, 1913
- Xenorhina ophiodon (Peters and Doria, 1878)
- Xenorhina oxycephala (Schlegel, 1858)
- Xenorhina parkerorum Zweifel, 1972
- Xenorhina perexigua Günther and Richards, 2021
- Xenorhina pohleorum Günther and Richards, 2021
- Xenorhina rostrata (Méhely, 1898)
- Xenorhina salawati Günther, Richards, Tjaturadi, and Krey, 2020
- Xenorhina scheepstrai (Blum and Menzies, 1989)
- Xenorhina schiefenhoeveli (Blum and Menzies, 1989)
- Xenorhina similis (Zweifel, 1956)
- Xenorhina subcrocea (Menzies and Tyler, 1977)
- Xenorhina thiekeorum Günther and Richards, 2021
- Xenorhina tillacki Günther, Richards, and Dahl, 2014
- Xenorhina tumulus (Blum and Menzies, 1989)
- Xenorhina varia Günther and Richards, 2005
- Xenorhina waigeo Günther, Richards, Tjaturadi, and Krey, 2020
- Xenorhina wiegankorum Günther and Richards, 2021
- Xenorhina woxvoldi Günther and Richards, 2021
- Xenorhina zweifeli (Kraus and Allison, 2002)
