= Sphenophryne dentata =

Conservation status
- Least Concern (IUCN 3.1)

Scientific classification
- Kingdom: Animalia
- Phylum: Chordata
- Class: Amphibia
- Order: Anura
- Family: Microhylidae
- Genus: Sphenophryne
- Species: S. dentata

Binomial name
- Sphenophryne dentata Tyler & Menzies, 1971

Synonyms
- Liophryne dentata (Tyler & Menzies, 1971)

Species of frog

Sphenophryne dentata is a species of frog in the family Microhylidae. It is endemic to Papua New Guinea. Its natural habitats are subtropical or tropical moist lowland forests and subtropical or tropical moist montane forests.
