= Cophixalus timidus =

Conservation status
- Critically Endangered (IUCN 3.1)

Scientific classification
- Kingdom: Animalia
- Phylum: Chordata
- Class: Amphibia
- Order: Anura
- Family: Microhylidae
- Genus: Cophixalus
- Species: C. timidus

Binomial name
- Cophixalus timidus Kraus and Allison, 2006
- Cophixalus timidus is only known from Mount Simpson, Papua New Guinea

Synonyms
- Asterophrys timida — Dubois et al., 2021

Species of frog

Cophixalus timidus is a species of frog in the family Microhylidae. It is endemic to New Guinea and only known from the northern slope of Mount Simpson in the Milne Bay Province, southeastern Papua New Guinea.

== Description ==
Adult males measure 13.5–17.5 mm (0.5–0.7 in) and adult females 14.4–21.1 mm (0.6–0.8 in) in snout–vent length. The snout is slightly projecting in lateral view but shallowly angulate when viewed from above. The tympanum is indistinct and small. The supratympanic fold is weakly developed. The fingers and toes are unwebbed. All fingers and toes except the first finger have discs with well-defined terminal grooves; the first finger has at most weakly developed terminal groove. The dorsum is typically dark brown but also be ochre. Most individuals have yellow markings such as lumbar ocelli and patches in the groin. The flanks and the limbs can have black flecks. The venter is light yellow with gray dusting or dark gray with light gray flecks. The iris is bronze with black horizontal streaks or tan.

== Habitat and conservation ==
Cophixalus timidus occurs in closed-canopy mid-elevation rainforest, montane cloud forest, and open montane mixed shrub-grassland at elevations of 1,400–2,500 m (4,600–8,200 ft) above sea level. Males call from the stems and leaves of shrubs, from within Pandanus leaf axil, and – at higher elevations – from low grass tussocks adjacent to the forest edge. Development presumably is direct (i.e., there is no free-living larval stage).

Cophixalus timidus appears to be common in its small known range. It is threatened by frequent fires set in its habitat. It could become threatened by chytridiomycosis.
