= Xenorhina oxycephala =

Conservation status
- Least Concern (IUCN 3.1)

Scientific classification
- Kingdom: Animalia
- Phylum: Chordata
- Class: Amphibia
- Order: Anura
- Family: Microhylidae
- Genus: Xenorhina
- Species: X. oxycephala

Binomial name
- Xenorhina oxycephala (Schlegel, 1858)

Species of frog

Xenorhina oxycephala is a species of frog in the family Microhylidae. It is found in New Guinea. Its natural habitats are subtropical or tropical moist lowland forests, rural gardens, urban areas, and heavily degraded former forest.
