= Choerophryne longirostris =

Conservation status
- Near Threatened (IUCN 3.1)

Scientific classification
- Kingdom: Animalia
- Phylum: Chordata
- Class: Amphibia
- Order: Anura
- Family: Microhylidae
- Genus: Choerophryne
- Species: C. longirostris

Binomial name
- Choerophryne longirostris Kraus & Allison, 2001

Species of frog

Choerophryne longirostris is a species of frog in the family Microhylidae. It is endemic to Mount Menawa in the Bewani Mountains of Papua New Guinea. It inhabits the interior and edges of closed-canopy rainforest.
