= Cophixalus variabilis =

Conservation status
- Least Concern (IUCN 3.1)

Scientific classification
- Kingdom: Animalia
- Phylum: Chordata
- Class: Amphibia
- Order: Anura
- Family: Microhylidae
- Genus: Cophixalus
- Species: C. variabilis

Binomial name
- Cophixalus variabilis Kraus and Allison, 2006

Species of frog

Cophixalus variabilis is a species of frog in the family Microhylidae. It is endemic to Papua New Guinea.
