= Scanty frog =

Conservation status
- Least Concern (IUCN 3.1)

Scientific classification
- Kingdom: Animalia
- Phylum: Chordata
- Class: Amphibia
- Order: Anura
- Family: Microhylidae
- Genus: Cophixalus
- Species: C. exiguus

Binomial name
- Cophixalus exiguus (Zweifel & F. Parker, 1969)
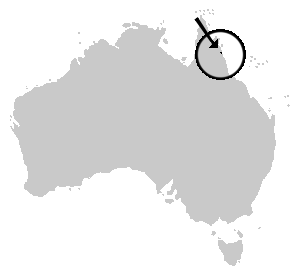
- Range of the Scanty Frog

Species of amphibian

The scanty frog (Cophixalus exiguus), also known as the dainty nursery frog, is a Microhylid frog found in a restricted area of rainforest in north-east Queensland. It is the smallest frog species in Australia.

== Description ==
The scanty frog is a very small frog, reaching a size of 16-19 millimetres (0.6-0.7 in). The dorsal surface is grey-brown, with random pale sections. In some specimens, a broad vertebral line is present, which broadens towards the eyes. It has a deep red patch on the groin. A faint "H" shape is present on the shoulders, and a V shape between the eyes. Toe pads are present, and webbing between toes and fingers are absent.

== Ecology and behaviour ==
The scanty frog is a semi-arboreal species, usually found on the ground, beneath logs and leaf litter. It will call during mating season, from within the trees, as high as 1.5 metres. The mating call is a series of fast clicks. Its habitat is vine rainforests, which can include Acacia. The scanty frog is found in northern Queensland, south of Cooktown. It is geographically isolated from most species within its genus.
