= Xenorhina huon =

Conservation status
- Data Deficient (IUCN 3.1)

Scientific classification
- Kingdom: Animalia
- Phylum: Chordata
- Class: Amphibia
- Order: Anura
- Family: Microhylidae
- Genus: Xenorhina
- Species: X. huon

Binomial name
- Xenorhina huon (Blum & Menzies, 1989)

Synonyms
- Xenobatrachus huon Blum & Menzies, 1989

Species of frog

Xenorhina huon is a species of frog in the family Microhylidae. It is endemic to Papua New Guinea. Its natural habitat is subtropical or tropical moist montane forests.
