= Australian Bird Calls =

Recording by Songs of Disappearance
- Released: 3 December 2021
- Genre: Bird calls
- Length: 25:00
- Label: Bowerbird Collective
- Producers: Anthony Albrecht; Simone Slattery; David Stewart

Songs of Disappearance chronology
Australian Bird Calls (2021)	Australian Frog Calls (2022)

Australian Bird Calls (also referred to as Songs of Disappearance: Australian Bird Calls and just Songs of Disappearance) is an album of Australian bird calls, released on 3 December 2021 by the Bowerbird Collective and BirdLife Australia. It was created to bring attention to endangered and threatened species of Australian birds. The recordings were made by nature recordist David Stewart and Nature Sound.

Following its physical release, Australian Bird Calls peaked at number two on the Australian ARIA Charts.

Although the title initially appeared as Songs of Disappearance, this later became the de facto "artist" name for the Bowerbird Collective's effort to bring attention to threatened and endangered Australian species, with the album itself then taking on the title of Australian Bird Calls as a "sequel" album of frog calls titled Australian Frog Calls, attributed to Songs of Disappearance, was released on 2 December 2022.

== Background ==
The album came from an idea by Anthony Albrecht, a PhD student at Charles Darwin University and co-founder of the Bowerbird Collective, and his supervisor Stephen Garnett, who wrote the report The Action Plan for Australian Birds 2020, published in December 2021, which found one in six (216 out of 1,299) Australian bird species are threatened. Garnett's report, released in collaboration with BirdLife Australia, further identified 50 species of Australian birds closest to "facing extinction due to lack of policy support and rampant climate change".

Violinist Simone Slattery, the other co-founder of Bowerbird Collective, arranged the first track, a collage of the 53 bird songs recorded by David Stewart over four decades. Slattery said she kept listening to the isolated bird calls until a structure came to mind "like a quirky dawn chorus. Some of these sounds will shock listeners because they're extremely percussive, they're not melodious at all. They're clicks, they're rattles, they're squawks and deep bass notes." The Guardian noted the "morse code-like song" of the night parrot, which had not been heard until 2013, as well as the call of the regent honeyeater, a bird now considered "so rare that it is literally losing its own voice out of loneliness".

BirdLife Australia CEO Paul Sullivan called the album "some rare recordings of birds that may not survive if we don't come together to protect them. While this campaign is fun, there's a serious side to what we're doing, and it's been heartening to see bird enthusiasts showing governments and businesses that Australians care about these important birds."

== Reception ==
Professional ratings
Review scores
Source	Rating
The Music	4.5/5 stars

A staff writer at The Music gave the album four-and-a-half out of five stars and posted a review consisting entirely of bird noises.

== Commercial performance ==
The album debuted at number five on the Australian ARIA Albums Chart dated 13 December 2021, selling over 2,000 units, with 1,500 of those being pre-ordered copies. The following week, it ascended to number three. It later re-entered at number two.

== Track listing ==
Australian Bird Calls track listing
No.	Title	Length
1.	"Songs of Disappearance"	2:55
2.	"Fernwren"	0:33
3.	"Purple-crowned Fairy-wren"	0:41
4.	"Western Heath Whipbird"	0:27
5.	"Kangaroo Island Brown Thornbill"	0:15
6.	"Gang-gang Cockatoo"	0:32
7.	"Golden Bowerbird"	0:41
8.	"Western Boobook"	0:22
9.	"Black-eared Miner"	0:32
10.	"Noisy Scrub-bird"	0:26
11.	"Australian Palm Cockatoo"	0:32
12.	"Carpentarian Grasswren"	0:22
13.	"Australian Eclectus Parrot"	0:18
14.	"Grey-headed Robin"	0:28
15.	"Carnaby's Black-Cockatoo"	0:21
16.	"South-Eastern Red-tailed Black-Cockatoo"	0:21
17.	"Indian Ocean Red-tailed Tropicbird"	0:19
18.	"South-eastern Hooded Robin"	0:26
19.	"Lowland Pilotbird"	0:30
20.	"Scrubtit"	0:11
21.	"Satin Bowerbird"	0:31
22.	"Mallee Emu-wren"	0:31
23.	"Christmas Island Boobook"	0:20
24.	"Australasian Bittern"	0:10
25.	"Christmas Island Frigatebird"	0:19
26.	"Southern Royal Albatross"	0:20
27.	"Malleefowl"	0:15
28.	"Kangaroo Island Glossy Black-Cockatoo"	0:27
29.	"Latham's Snipe"	0:29
30.	"Far Eastern Curlew"	0:21
31.	"Great Knot"	0:19
32.	"Yakutian Bar-tailed Godwit"	0:11
33.	"Red Goshawk"	0:12
34.	"Southern Barking Owl"	0:28
35.	"Norfolk Island Green Parrot"	0:20
36.	"Southern Squatter Pigeon"	0:27
37.	"Lord Howe Woodhen"	0:22
38.	"Eastern Grey Plover"	0:15
39.	"Regent honeyeater"	0:30
40.	"Swift Parrot"	0:29
41.	"Christmas Island Imperial Pigeon"	0:21
42.	"Mallee Striated Grasswren"	0:31
43.	"Northern Eastern Bristlebird"	0:19
44.	"Princess Parrot"	0:31
45.	"Western Bristlebird"	0:26
46.	"Plains-wanderer"	0:30
47.	"Mallee Whipbird"	0:25
48.	"Eastern Regent Parrot"	0:26
49.	"Flinders Ranges Thick-billed Grasswren"	0:20
50.	"Western Bassian Thrush"	0:28
51.	"Yellow Chat"	0:17
52.	"Western Ground Parrot"	0:51
53.	"Forty-spotted Pardalote"	0:26
54.	"Night Parrot"	0:29
Total length:		25:00

== Charts ==
Chart performance for Australian Bird Calls
Chart (2021)	Peak position
Australian Albums (ARIA)	2

== Release history ==
Release history for Australian Bird Calls
Region	Date	Format	Label
Various	3 December 2021	Digital download; streaming	The Bowerbird Collective
Australia	4 February 2022	CD	The Bowerbird Collective
