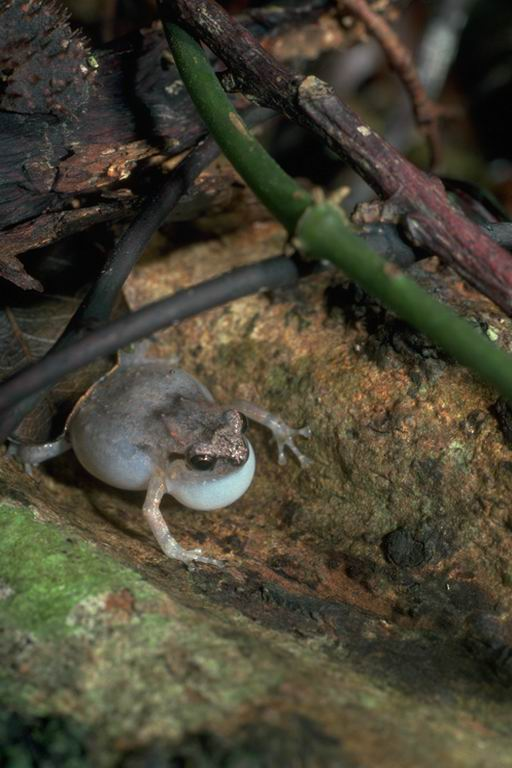
- Cophixalus ornatus

Scientific classification
- Kingdom: Animalia
- Phylum: Chordata
- Class: Amphibia
- Order: Anura
- Family: Microhylidae
- Subfamily: Asterophryinae
- Genus: Cophixalus; Boettger, 1892

Species
- See table.

= Cophixalus =

Genus of amphibians

Cophixalus (rainforest frogs or nursery frogs) is a genus of microhylid frogs. These are arboreal species with expanded toe-pads, endemic to Moluccan Islands, New Guinea and northeastern Queensland, Australia.

== Species ==
As of December 2019, Amphibian Species of the World assigns 67 species to the genus Cophixalus.

The source column gives direct links to the sources used:

- IUCN description of species at International Union for Conservation of Nature Red List of Threatened Species. IUCN Red List categories are:

EX - Extinct, EW - Extinct in the Wild
CR - Critically Endangered, EN - Endangered, VU - Vulnerable
NT - Near Threatened, LC - Least Concern
DD - Data Deficient, NE - Not Evaluated

- ASW description of species at Amphibian Species of the World.

Binomial name and authority	Common name	Geographic range	CS	Source
Cophixalus aenigma Hoskin, 2004	Thornton rainforest frog	north-eastern Queensland	VU	ASW IUCN
Cophixalus albolineatus Kraus, 2012		Mount Shungol, New Guinea		ASW
Cophixalus amabilis Kraus, 2012		Woodlark Island (PNG)		ASW
Cophixalus ateles (Boulenger, 1898)	Papua rainforest frog	Mount Obree (New Guinea, PNG); possibly widespread in south-eastern Papua New Guinea	DD	ASW IUCN
Cophixalus australis Hoskin, 2012	southern ornate nursery-frog	north-east Queensland		ASW
Cophixalus balbus Günther, 2003	Yapen rainforest frog	Yapen Island (Indonesia)	DD	ASW IUCN
Cophixalus bewaniensis Kraus & Allison, 2000	Menawa rainforest frog	Bewani Mountains (New Guinea, PNG)	DD	ASW IUCN
Cophixalus biroi (Méhely, 1901)	Sattelberg rainforest frog	northern New Guinea (Indonesia and Papua New Guinea)	LC	ASW IUCN
Cophixalus bombiens Zweifel, 1985	buzzing rainforest frog	north-eastern Queensland	NT	ASW IUCN
Cophixalus cateae Richards and Günther, 2019		Agogo Range in Southern Highlands Province, Papua New Guinea		ASW
Cophixalus caverniphilus Kraus and Allison, 2009		Muller Range (New Guinea, PNG)		ASW
Cophixalus cheesmanae Parker, 1934	Kokoda rainforest frog	eastern Papua New Guinea	LC	ASW IUCN
Cophixalus clapporum Kraus, 2012		Woodlark Island (PNG)		ASW
Cophixalus concinnus Tyler, 1979	rattling rainforest frog	north-eastern Queensland (Australia)	CR	ASW IUCN
Cophixalus crepitans Zweifel, 1985	rusty rainforest frog	eastern Cape York Peninsula (Queensland, Australia)	NT	ASW IUCN
Cophixalus cryptotympanum Zweifel, 1956	Zweifel's rainforest frog	Mount Dayman (New Guinea, PNG)	DD	ASW IUCN
Cophixalus cupricarenus Kraus and Allison, 2009		Rossel Island (PNG)		ASW
Cophixalus daymani Zweifel, 1956	Dayman rainforest frog	Mount Dayman (PNG)	DD	ASW IUCN
Cophixalus desticans Kraus and Allison, 2009		south-easternmost tip of New Guinea, Normanby Island (PNG)		ASW
Cophixalus exiguus Zweifel & Parker, 1969	Cooktown rainforest frog	north-eastern Queensland (Australia)	NT	ASW IUCN
Cophixalus hannahae Richards and Günther, 2019		central cordillera of Papua New Guinea		ASW
Cophixalus hinchinbrookensis Hoskin, 2012	Hinchinbrook Island nursery-frog	Hinchinbrook Island (Queensland, Australia)		ASW
Cophixalus hosmeri Zweifel, 1985	clicking rainforest frog	northern Queensland (Australia)	LC	ASW IUCN
Cophixalus humicola Günther, 2006	Waira rainforest frog	Yapen Island, northern New Guinea (Indonesia)	LC	ASW IUCN
Cophixalus infacetus Zweifel, 1985	chocolate rainforest frog	north-eastern Queensland (Australia)	LC	ASW IUCN
Cophixalus interruptus Kraus and Allison, 2009		Morobe Province (New Guinea, PNG)		ASW
Cophixalus iovaorum Kraus and Allison, 2009		Mount Obree (New Guinea, PNG)		ASW
Cophixalus kaindiensis Zweifel, 1979	Kaindi rainforest frog	Mount Kaindi and Mount Missim (New Guinea, PNG)	DD	ASW IUCN
Cophixalus kethuk Kraus and Allison, 2009		Rossel Island (PNG)		ASW
Cophixalus kulakula Hoskin and Aland, 2011		north-eastern Queensland (Australia)		ASW
Cophixalus linnaeus Kraus and Allison, 2009		Bowutu Mountains (New Guinea, PNG)		ASW
Cophixalus mcdonaldi Zweifel, 1985	Mcdonald's rainforest frog	north-eastern Queensland (Australia)	EN	ASW IUCN
Cophixalus melanops Kraus and Allison, 2009		Tagula Island (PNG)		ASW
Cophixalus misimae Richards & Oliver, 2007	Misima rainforest frog	Misima Island (PNG)	CR	ASW IUCN
Cophixalus monosyllabus Günther, 2010		southern Fakfak Mountains (New Guinea, Indonesia)		ASW
Cophixalus montanus (Boettger, 1895)	mountain rainforest frog	Halmahera Island (Indonesia)	DD	ASW IUCN
Cophixalus monticola Richards, Dennis, Trenerry, & Werren, 1994	carbine rainforest frog	northern Queensland (Australia)	EN	ASW IUCN
Cophixalus neglectus Zweifel, 1962	brown rainforest frog	northern Queensland (Australia)	EN	ASW IUCN
Cophixalus nexipus Kraus, 2012		Mount Obree (New Guinea, PNG)		ASW
Cophixalus nubicola Zweifel, 1962	Michael rainforest frog	Mount Michael (New Guinea, PNG)	VU	ASW IUCN
Cophixalus ornatus (Fry, 1912)	ornate rainforest frog	mid-eastern Queensland, Hinchinbrook (Australia)	LC	ASW IUCN
Cophixalus pakayakulangun Hoskin and Aland, 2011		north-eastern Queensland (Australia)		ASW
Cophixalus parkeri Loveridge, 1948	Parker's rainforest frog	central mountainous region of Papua New Guinea	LC	ASW IUCN
Cophixalus peninsularis Zweifel, 1985	peninsula rainforest frog	northern Queensland (Australia)	DD	ASW IUCN
Cophixalus petrophilus Hoskin, 2013	blotched boulder-frog			
Cophixalus phaeobalius Kraus and Allison, 2009		Bowutu Mountains (New Guinea, PNG)		ASW
Cophixalus pictus Kraus, 2012		West Papua Province (New Guinea, Indonesia)		ASW
Cophixalus pipilans Zweifel, 1980	Sempi rainforest frog	from Lae to the Adelbert Mountains (New Guinea, PNG)	LC	ASW IUCN
Cophixalus pulchellus Kraus & Allison, 2000	pretty rainforest frog	Mount Hunstein (New Guinea, PNG)	DD	ASW IUCN
Cophixalus rajampatensis Günther, Richards, Tjaturadi, and Krey, 2015		Raja Ampat Island group off of western New Guinea (Indonesia)		ASW
Cophixalus riparius Zweifel, 1962	Wilhelm rainforest frog	central mountain ranges of Papua Guinea (PNG)	LC	ASW IUCN
Cophixalus salawatiensis Günther, Richards, Tjaturadi, and Krey, 2015		Raja Ampat Island group off of western New Guinea (Indonesia)		ASW
Cophixalus saxatilis Zweifel & Parker, 1977	Black Mountain rainforest frog	northern Queensland (Australia)	VU	ASW IUCN
Cophixalus shellyi Zweifel, 1956	Shelly's rainforest frog	central mountain ranges of Papua New Guinea, Adelbert Mountains, Huon Peninsula	LC	ASW IUCN
Cophixalus sphagnicola Zweifel & Allison, 1982	Morobe rainforest frog	Mount Amungwiwa, Mount Kaini, and Mount Missim (New Guinea, PNG)	LC	ASW IUCN
Cophixalus tagulensis Zweifel, 1963	Tagula rainforest frog	Tagula Island (PNG)	DD	ASW IUCN
Cophixalus tenuidactylus Günther and Richards, 2012		Kaijende Highlands (New Guinea, PNG)		ASW
Cophixalus tetzlaffi Günther, 2003	Bomberai rainforest frog	Bomberai Peninsula (New Guinea, Indonesia)	DD	ASW IUCN
Cophixalus timidus Kraus & Allison, 2006	Simpson rainforest frog	Mount Simpson (New Guinea, PNG)	DD	ASW IUCN
Cophixalus tomaiodactylus Kraus and Allison, 2009		Bowutu Mountains (New Guinea, PNG)		ASW
Cophixalus tridactylus Günther, 2006	Wondiwoi rainforest frog	Wondiwoi Mountains (New Guinea, Indonesia)	DD	ASW IUCN
Cophixalus variabilis Kraus & Allison, 2006	Pekopekowana rainforest frog	south-eastern Papua New Guinea	LC	ASW IUCN
Cophixalus verecundus Zweifel & Parker, 1989	Myola rainforest frog	Mount Bellamy (New Guinea, PNG); presumably more widely distributed	DD	ASW IUCN
Cophixalus verrucosus (Boulenger, 1898)	Moroke rainforest frog	southern and eastern Papua New Guinea	LC	ASW IUCN
Cophixalus viridis Günther, Richards, and Dahl, 2014	Green rainforest frog	Muller Range, Western Province, Papua New Guinea		ASW
Cophixalus wempi Richards and Oliver, 2010		Southern Highlands Province (New Guinea, PNG)		ASW
Cophixalus zweifeli Davies & McDonald, 1998	Cape Melville rainforest frog	northern Queensland (Australia)	DD	ASW IUCN
