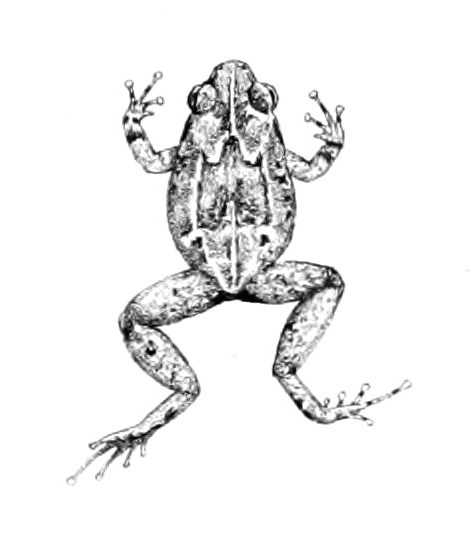

Conservation status
- Least Concern (IUCN 3.1)

Scientific classification
- Kingdom: Animalia
- Phylum: Chordata
- Class: Amphibia
- Order: Anura
- Family: Microhylidae
- Genus: Cophixalus
- Species: C. ateles

Binomial name
- Cophixalus ateles (Boulenger, 1898)

Synonyms
- Cophixalus sisyphus Kraus and Allison, 2006

= Cophixalus ateles =

Species of frog

Cophixalus ateles (common name: Papua rainforest frog) is a species of frog in the family Microhylidae. It is endemic to Papua New Guinea. Its natural habitat is tropical moist lowland forests.
