= Mountain-top nursery frog =

Conservation status
- Critically Endangered (IUCN 3.1)

Scientific classification
- Kingdom: Animalia
- Phylum: Chordata
- Class: Amphibia
- Order: Anura
- Family: Microhylidae
- Genus: Cophixalus
- Species: C. monticola

Binomial name
- Cophixalus monticola Richards, Dennis, Trenerry & Werren, 1994

Species of amphibian

The mountain-top nursery-frog (Cophixalus monticola) is a species of frog in the family Microhylidae. It is endemic to Australia. Its natural habitat is subtropical or tropical moist montane forests. It is threatened by habitat loss.
