= Tapping nursery frog =

Conservation status
- Vulnerable (IUCN 3.1)

Scientific classification
- Kingdom: Animalia
- Phylum: Chordata
- Class: Amphibia
- Order: Anura
- Family: Microhylidae
- Genus: Cophixalus
- Species: C. aenigma

Binomial name
- Cophixalus aenigma Hoskin, 2004

Species of amphibian

The tapping nursery frog (Cophixalus aenigma) is a species of frog in the family Microhylidae.

It is endemic to Australia. Its natural habitats are subtropical or tropical moist lowland forests and subtropical or tropical moist montane forests.
