= Cophixalus bewaniensis =

Conservation status
- Data Deficient (IUCN 3.1)

Scientific classification
- Kingdom: Animalia
- Phylum: Chordata
- Class: Amphibia
- Order: Anura
- Family: Microhylidae
- Genus: Cophixalus
- Species: C. bewaniensis

Binomial name
- Cophixalus bewaniensis Kraus and Allison, 2000
- Cophixalus bewaniensis is only known from the Bewani Mountains in Papua New Guinea

Species of frog

Cophixalus bewaniensis is a species of frog in the family Microhylidae. It is endemic to Mount Menawa in the Bewani Mountains, West Sepik Province, mainland Papua New Guinea. The specific name refers to its type locality.

== Description ==
The type series consists of two adult males measuring 15 and 17 mm (0.6 and 0.7 in) in snout–vent length. No other specimens are known. The snout is truncate. The tympanum is very indistinct and there is a weak supratympanic fold. The eyes are moderately large. The fingers and the toes bear small discs, except for the first finger that is greatly reduced and lacks a disc. The first toe is also reduced but bears a tiny disc. No webbing is present. The dorsum has reddish-tan ground color. There is a large, black blotch behind the forearm.

== Habitat and conservation ==
The types were found among shrubs in closed-canopy rainforest at 950 m (3,120 ft) above sea level. There are no known threats to this little known species. The type locality is outside protected areas.
