= Elegant frog =

Conservation status
- Critically Endangered (IUCN 3.1)

Scientific classification
- Kingdom: Animalia
- Phylum: Chordata
- Class: Amphibia
- Order: Anura
- Family: Microhylidae
- Genus: Cophixalus
- Species: C. concinnus

Binomial name
- Cophixalus concinnus Tyler, 1979.

Species of amphibian

The elegant frog or beautiful nursery-frog (Cophixalus concinnus) is a critically endangered species of amphibian. This particular frog species is found in Australia's montane rainforests, usually under logs and in leaf litter. Their geographic range within Australia is less than 100 km^{2}.

== Characteristics ==
These frogs are grey on their backs with pale or orange patches. The belly is usually white, yellow or brown. Their size is usually around 25 mm. The texture of the entire frog is smooth. The fingers and toes are large pads but they are not webbed. Their call sounds like a number of clicks or a rattle that lasts for a few seconds.

== Ecology ==
This species is often located in Australian rainforests at high elevations. They are usually found on the forest floor in leaf litter. Their mating calls occur on tree trunks, logs and bushes. They are Terrestrial breeders. Their unpigmented eggs are laid underneath rocks or logs with moist soil. They are laid in a string. The average number of eggs deposited per year is 1–50 eggs per female.

== Conservation ==
This species is listed as critically endangered because its occurrence is less than 100 km^{2}, and its area occupancy is less than 10 km^{2}. The individuals are located in a single location, and there is also a prediction that a decline in the frog's mature species will occur because of Global warming. Other threats often occur in Australian National Parks that are, and the development of walking tracks and other facilities designed for tourists. In addition to its IUCN listing, it has been certified critically endangered under the EPBC Act since July 2019.
