= Bewani Mountains =

Mountain range in northwestern Papua New Guinea

- Location within Papua New Guinea

Highest point
- Elevation: 1,960 m (6,430 ft)
- Coordinates: 3°10′00″S 141°15′00″E

Geology
- Rock age: Late Eocene-Early Oligocene
- Mountain type: Mountain range

The Bewani Mountains form a mountain range in northwestern Papua New Guinea. Together with the Torricelli Mountains and Prince Alexander Mountains it forms the North Coastal Range of Papua New Guinea. The highest point of the mountains is at 1,960 m.

The Bewani languages and various other Papuan languages are spoken in the region.

== Geology ==
The Bewani-Torricelli-Prince Alexander Mountains, are presumed to have been formed as an island arc in the Late Eocene-Early Oligocene.

== Ecology ==
As with other mountain ranges in Papua New Guinea, the Bewani Mountains are home to many rare species of fauna and flora and is highly biodiverse. The black sicklebill (Epimachus fastuosus) is a threatened species which is known from a few localities in the Bewani and Torricelli mountains. Fiwo, a subspecies of the tenkile (Dendrolagus scottae) tree-kangaroo, is thought to be endemic to the Bewani Mountains. Two frog species described in 2000/2001, Cophixalus bewaniensis and Choerophryne longirostris, are so far only known from the Bewani Mountains.

== See also ==
- Bewani Range languages
- Bewani River
- Bewani-Wutung Onei Rural LLG
