= Richard G. Zweifel =

American herpetologist (1926–2019)

Richard George Zweifel (November 5, 1926, in Los Angeles – November 25, 2019) was an American herpetologist, who classified several species in the American Southwest and in Australia, including the rattling frog. Zweifel contributed immensely to the documentation of the nowadays Aspidoscelis costatus species. Out of the eight costata subspecies, Dr. Zweifel reported and named five of them. Zweifel worked at the American Museum of Natural History from 1954 to 1989, and was Herpetology Department Chairman from 1968 to 1980.

Zweifel was a resident of Northvale, New Jersey, and in Arizona.

== Bibliography ==
- Zweifel RG (1955). "Ecology, distribution and systematics of frogs of the Rana boylei group". Univ. California Pub. Zool. 54 (4): 207–292.
- Zweifel RG (1985). Australian Frogs of the Family Microhylidae. ISBN 99953-48-60-8.
- Zweifel RG (1998). Encyclopedia of Reptiles & Amphibians. (with Harold George Cogger and David Kirshner) ISBN 0-12-178560-2.
- Zweifel RG (2001). Encyclopedia of Animals: Mammals, Birds, Reptiles, Amphibians. (with Harold George Cogger, Joseph Forshaw, Edwin Gould, and George McKay) ISBN 1-875137-99-8.

== Legacy ==
In 1984, he was honored by the naming of "Zweifel's frog" (Lithobates zweifeli ), found in Mexico, and in 1998 a microhylid frog Cophixalus zweifeli was named after him. Several other amphibians have been named for him: Nyctimystes zweifeli, Xenorhina zweifeli, and Oscaecilia zweifeli, as is the proposed (sub)genus Zweifelia.
