= Choerophryne swanhildae =

Conservation status
- Least Concern (IUCN 3.1)

Scientific classification
- Kingdom: Animalia
- Phylum: Chordata
- Class: Amphibia
- Order: Anura
- Family: Microhylidae
- Genus: Choerophryne
- Species: C. swanhildae

Binomial name
- Choerophryne swanhildae (Menzies, 1999)

Synonyms
- Albericus swanhildae Menzies, 1999

Species of frog

Choerophryne swanhildae is a species of frog in the family Microhylidae. It is endemic to Papua New Guinea and is known from the Hagen and Kubor ranges.

== Etymology ==
This species was originally described in the genus Albericus, named for Alberich, the dwarf in Scandinavian mythology and Richard Wagner's opera cycle Der Ring des Nibelungen. Menzies named the species he described after Alberich's companions in the mythodology, in this case Swanhild.

== Description ==
The type series consists of eight unsexed individuals measuring 14–15 mm (0.55–0.59 in) in snout–urostyle length. Later examination of six of these has revealed them all as males, measuring 14–16 mm (0.55–0.63 in) in snout–vent length. The dorsum is exceptionally warty. The throat is black whereas the belly is grey or spotted. No bright colours are present.

The male advertisement call is a series of very short, bell-like notes. The dominant frequency is about 4 kHz.

== Habitat and conservation ==
Choerophryne swanhildae occurs in mid-montane rainforest at 1,920–2,500 m (6,300–8,200 ft) above sea level. The type locality is a Pandanus grove. Development is presumably direct; i.e., there is no free-living larval stage.

This species is quite common. Threats to it are poorly known, but it appears to tolerate some habitat modification from logging. It is not known to occur in any protected area.
