= Choerophryne fafniri =

Conservation status
- Least Concern (IUCN 3.1)

Scientific classification
- Kingdom: Animalia
- Phylum: Chordata
- Class: Amphibia
- Order: Anura
- Family: Microhylidae
- Genus: Choerophryne
- Species: C. fafniri

Binomial name
- Choerophryne fafniri (Menzies, 1999)

Synonyms
- Albericus fafniri Menzies, 1999

Species of frog

Choerophryne fafniri is a species of frog in the family Microhylidae. It is endemic to Papua New Guinea and is only known from the north-western slopes of Mount Giluwe and south-east of Mount Hagen in the Southern Highlands Province.

== Etymology ==
This species was originally described in the genus Albericus, named for Alberich, the dwarf in Scandinavian mythology and Richard Wagner's opera cycle Der Ring des Nibelungen. Menzies named the species he described after Alberich's companions in the mythodology. The specific name fafniri is derived from Fafnir.

== Description ==
Choerophryne fafniri is a comparatively large species: six unsexed individuals in the type series measure 21.0–22.2 mm (0.83–0.87 in) in snout–urostyle length. Later examination of five of these has revealed them to be males measuring 21.0–23.1 mm (0.83–0.91 in) in snout–vent length. It is very similar to Choerophryne darlingtoni. The flanks and belly are orange to dark red and heavily blotched with brown. There are usually vague lumbar ocelli.

The male advertisement call has been described as a "slow buzz". Note length is comparatively long at about 650 ms. Pulse rate starts slow, then increases abruptly, before slowing again.

== Habitat and conservation ==
Choerophryne fafniri lives in mid-altitude montane rainforest at an elevation of about 2,400 m (7,900 ft) above sea level. It is locally common. No major threats to it are known, although selective logging is a possible threat.
