= Choerophryne nigrescens =

Scientific classification
- Kingdom: Animalia
- Phylum: Chordata
- Class: Amphibia
- Order: Anura
- Family: Microhylidae
- Genus: Choerophryne
- Species: C. nigrescens

Binomial name
- Choerophryne nigrescens Günther, 2008

Species of amphibian

Choerophryne nigrescens is a species of frogs in the family Microhylidae. It is endemic to the Papua Province, Indonesia, and is known from its type locality and two other localities on the island of Yapen (Papua Province), off the north-western coast of New Guinea, as well as from one record from Foja Mountains in New Guinea. Common name blackish choerophryne has been suggested for it.

== Description ==
Three adult males in the type series measure 17–18 mm (0.67–0.71 in) in snout–urostyle length, making it a relatively large Choerophryne; females are unknown. The snout is moderately long (20–21% of the body length). The eyes are moderately-sized. The tympanum is small. All fingers and toes bear large and conspicuous discs. The dorsum is reddish brown, with blackish blotches. There are also blackish bands in the limbs. There are small whitish spots allover. The ventrum is white with dense, blackish reticulations.

The male advertisement call is a series of distinctly pulsed notes, but in tight succession so as to give an impression of a single, modulated note. The dominant frequency is at 2.9 kHz.

Most records of Choerophryne nigrescens are from the island of Yapen (circle). There is also a record from the Foja Mountains (triangle). Both are in Papua Province, Indonesia.

== Habitat and ecology ==
At Yapen, Choerophryne nigrescens inhabits primary and secondary rain forest at elevations of 5–850 m (16–2,789 ft) above sea level. At sites where Choerophryne nigrescens co-occurs with Choerophryne arndtorum, it is much less abundant than the latter species. Males call from hollows and crevices of large, rotting logs on the ground, sometimes higher from the ground (to 2.5 m) on plant stems. One specimen was found on top of a pile of logs.
