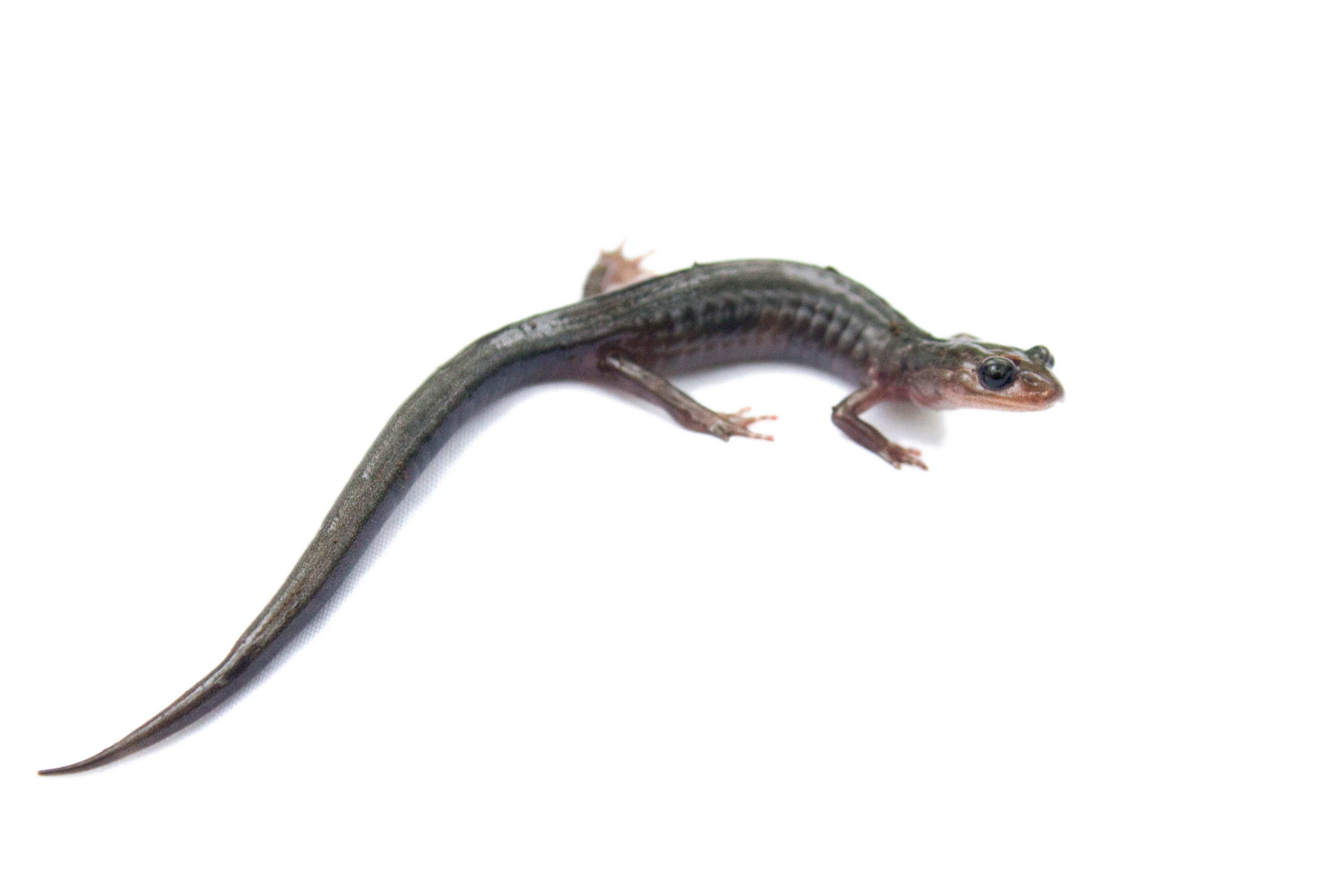

Conservation status
- Least Concern (IUCN 3.1)

Scientific classification
- Kingdom: Animalia
- Phylum: Chordata
- Class: Amphibia
- Order: Urodela
- Family: Plethodontidae
- Genus: Plethodon
- Species: P. montanus

Binomial name
- Plethodon montanus Highton & Peabody, 2000

= Northern gray-cheeked salamander =

Species of amphibian

The northern gray-cheeked salamander (Plethodon montanus) is a species of salamander in the family Plethodontidae and endemic to the Blue Ridge Mountains and Appalachian Mountains in the eastern United States. It is closely related to the Red-cheeked salamander and the Red-legged salamander. Its natural habitat is temperate forests. It is found under moss, rocks, logs, and bark in cool, moist forests above 2500 feet. Especially found in spruce-fir forests. The Gray-cheeked Salamander commonly eats millipedes, earthworms, crane flies, spiders, and centipedes and less commonly eats ants, mites, and springtails. They eat spiders, moths, flies, beetles, bees, and snails. The male and female perform a courtship, where the male nudges the female with his snout, does a foot dance, then circles under the female and the two then walk together. Like other salamanders, they do not migrate or aggregate during breeding season. It is threatened by habitat loss.
