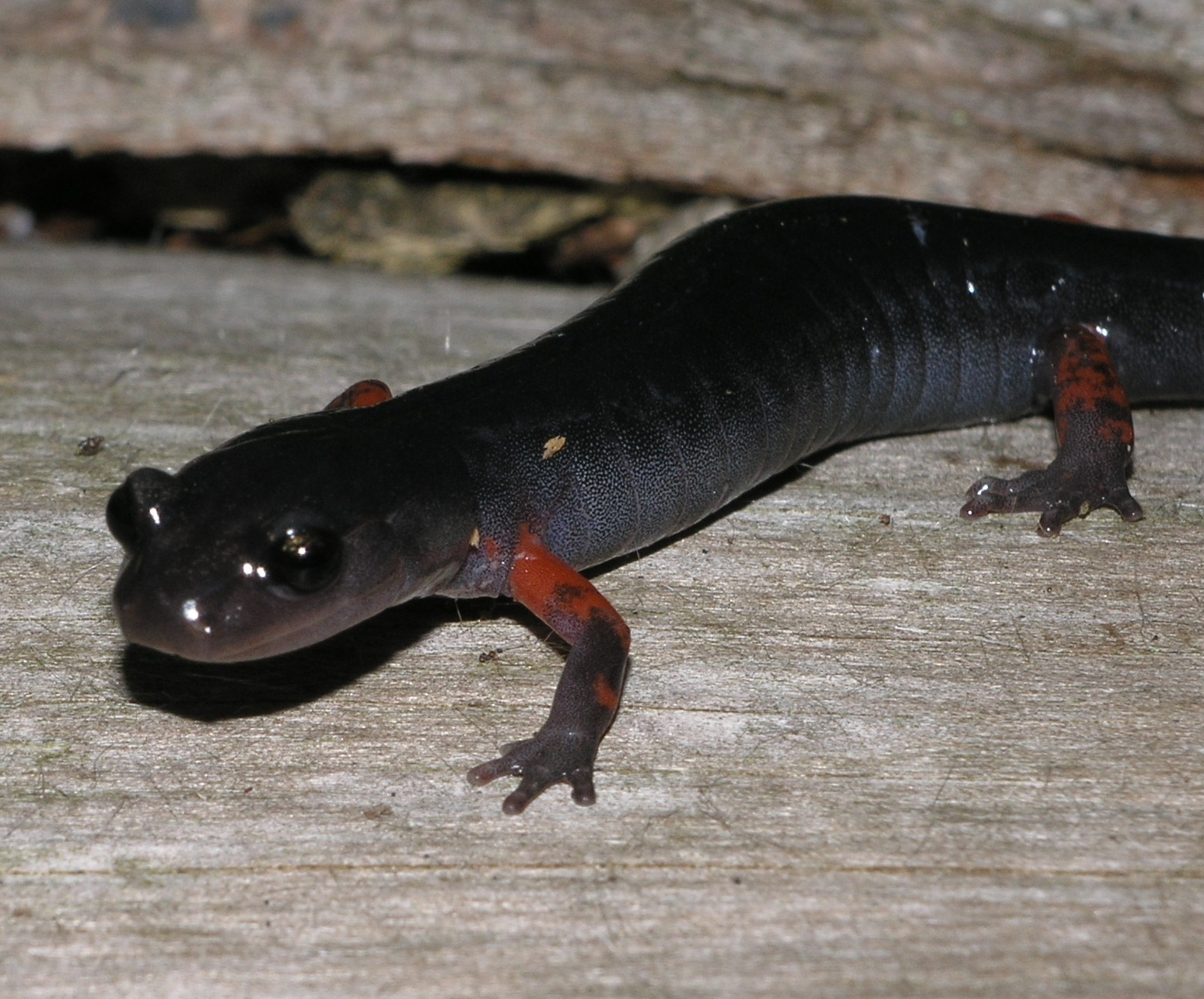

Conservation status
- Vulnerable (IUCN 3.1)

- Critically Imperiled (NatureServe)

Scientific classification
- Kingdom: Animalia
- Phylum: Chordata
- Class: Amphibia
- Order: Urodela
- Family: Plethodontidae
- Genus: Plethodon
- Species: P. cheoah

Binomial name
- Plethodon cheoah Highton & Peabody, 2000

= Cheoah Bald salamander =

Species of amphibian

The Cheoah Bald salamander (Plethodon cheoah) is a species of salamander in the family Plethodontidae endemic to the state of North Carolina in the United States. It is found mostly in the southwestern part of the state due to its natural habitat in temperate forests and mountains.

The Cheoah Bald salamander faces threats to its population due to habitat loss caused by clearcutting. It was formerly considered a variant of the red-cheeked salamander until it was found to be a distinct species. It has not been known to hybridize with other species; however, it is closely related to the red-legged salamander.

== Description ==
Cheoah Bald salamanders are identified with dark grey bodies, cheeks with grey blotches, and red legs.

== Diet ==
The Cheoah Bald salamander has a varied diet, including small vertebrates that are located on forest floors.

== Range and habitat ==
The Cheoah Bald salamander has a narrow range and is only found in the southwestern region of North Carolina. In the state, most of the population remains at high points on a specific mountain. In forest locations, they tend to stay covered underneath objects.

== Taxonomy ==
=== Hybridization ===
There is little evidence that Cheoah Bald Salamanders have directly hybridized with other salamander species, suggesting they have their own distinct genetic history. In a 2005 study, researchers found that they are a close relative of the red-legged salamander, although there is no record of them transferring DNA to one another. The two species share the same haplotypes from a certain genetic group, which gives them their unique red legs. These two species are the only known eastern lungless salamanders to have red-colored legs.

== Threats ==
=== Population Decline ===
Cheoah Bald salamanders underwent a great decline in their population during the 1990s, most notably in Graham, North Carolina. Researchers made various visits to their habitats in Graham and noticed a drop in their numbers compared to previous years. Before the 1990s, they reported a mean number of 8.5 salamanders across the visits they made during the study. But in the 1990s, they identified a mean of only 6.7 salamanders during their visits in Graham.

=== Habitat Loss ===
Cheoah Bald salamanders, along with other salamander species located in the southern Appalachian forests of North Carolina, suffer from habitat loss due to clearcutting. When trees are removed for logging, it disrupts the Cheoah Bald salamander's natural environment. They are sensitive to disturbances in their habitat, which can further cause psychological stress and eventually death.
