= Hagensberg =

Hagensberg may refer to:

- Āgenskalns, a district in Riga, Latvia
- Mount Hagen (volcano) (3,778 m), the second highest volcano in Papua New Guinea
