= Choerophryne tubercula =

Conservation status
- Data Deficient (IUCN 3.1)

Scientific classification
- Kingdom: Animalia
- Phylum: Chordata
- Class: Amphibia
- Order: Anura
- Family: Microhylidae
- Genus: Choerophryne
- Species: C. tubercula

Binomial name
- Choerophryne tubercula (Richards, Johnston, and Burton, 1992)

Synonyms
- Cophixalus tuberculus Richards, Johnston, and Burton, 1992; Albericus tuberculus (Richards, Johnston, and Burton, 1992)

Species of frog

Choerophryne tubercula is a species of frog in the family Microhylidae. It is endemic to Papua New Guinea and known from scattered locations in the New Guinea Highlands. However, the species is likely to occur also in the Indonesian part of New Guinea. Common name warty rainforest ground frog has been coined for it.

== Description ==
Adults measure 14–18 mm (0.55–0.71 in) in snout–urostyle length. Skin is warty. The dorsal ground colour is variable and ranges from pale fawn to very dark brown. Some individuals have a light mid-dorsal line and most have a dark hour-glass mark commencing between the eyes. The iris is gold with dark marks.

The male advertisement call is a series of nasal squeaks. Each note lasts 250–350 ms.

== Habitat and conservation ==
Its natural habitats are lower montane rainforests at elevations of 1,000–1,900 m (3,300–6,200 ft) above sea level. It also occurs in disturbed forest habitats. No significant threats affecting this locally abundant species that can tolerate some habitat modification are known.
