= Choerophryne valkuriarum =

Conservation status
- Least Concern (IUCN 3.1)

Scientific classification
- Kingdom: Animalia
- Phylum: Chordata
- Class: Amphibia
- Order: Anura
- Family: Microhylidae
- Genus: Choerophryne
- Species: C. valkuriarum

Binomial name
- Choerophryne valkuriarum (Menzies, 1999)

Synonyms
- Albericus valkuriarum Menzies, 1999

Species of frog

Choerophryne valkuriarum is a species of frog in the family Microhylidae. It is endemic to the eastern New Guinea in Papua New Guinea and is known from near Wau in the Ekuti Dividing Range south to Myola in the Owen Stanley Range. The nominal species might consist of more than one distinct species.

== Etymology ==
This species was originally described in the genus Albericus, named for Alberich, the dwarf in Scandinavian mythology and Richard Wagner's opera cycle Der Ring des Nibelungen. Menzies named the Albericus species he described after Alberich's companions in the mythodology, in this case the valkyries.

== Description ==
Choerophryne valkuriarum is similar to other former Albericus, although it is smaller than most others: the specimens in the type series measure 14–20 mm (0.55–0.79 in) in snout–urostyle length. Their sex was originally unspecified but later examination has shown all of them to be males. The limbs are relatively short. Some specimens have a mid-dorsal line or lumbar ocelli.

The male advertisement call consists of single "clicks", uttered once or in irregular series with rates up to 120 notes per minute. The call has no musical quality.

== Habitat and conservation ==
Choerophryne valkuriarum occurs in mid-montane rainforest and on the forest edge at elevations of 2,000–2,930 m (6,560–9,610 ft) above sea level. It has been found in a few rural gardens but does not tolerate severe habitat degradation. Development is presumably direct; i.e., there is no free-living larval stage.

This species is very abundant but can be locally threatened by habitat degradation. It occurs in the Mount Kaindi Wildlife Management Area.
