= Choerophryne microps =

Scientific classification
- Kingdom: Animalia
- Phylum: Chordata
- Class: Amphibia
- Order: Anura
- Family: Microhylidae
- Genus: Choerophryne
- Species: C. microps

Binomial name
- Choerophryne microps Günther, 2008

Species of amphibian

Choerophryne microps is a species of frogs in the family Microhylidae. It is endemic to Western New Guinea and known from the Wondiwoi Mountains, at the base of the Wandammen Peninsula. The common name "small-eyed choerophryne" has been suggested for it.

== Description ==
Adult males measure 15–17 mm (0.59–0.67 in) and females 18–20 mm (0.71–0.79 in) in snout–urostyle length. The snout is very long (21–25% of the body length) and pointed. The eyes are relatively small (hence the specific name microps, or "small-eyed", derived from Greek). The tympanum is small and partly covered by the supra-tympanic fold. The fingers and toes bear discs. Both dorsal and ventral surfaces have light to dark grey ground color, with dark brown markings. There is an hour-glass marking on the dorsum.

The male advertisement call is a series of distinctly pulsed notes, typically with 5–9 notes. Each note consists of 9 to 29 pulses, with dominant frequency at 4 kHz.

Choerophryne microps is only known from the area of its type locality, the Wondiwoi Mountains in West Papua, Indonesia

== Habitat and ecology ==
Choerophryne microps inhabits primary rain forest at elevations of 380–1,000 m (1,250–3,280 ft) above sea level. It was found to be locally very common, with highest abundance at intermediate altitudes (500–700 m). Males call from on or in leaf litter or rotting logs, sometimes higher from the ground (to 1 m) in the hollows of plant stems. The diet is dominated by small ants.
