= Rainforest toad =

Rainforest toad may refer to:

- Campbell's rainforest toad (Incilius campbelli), a frog in the family Bufonidae found in Belize, Guatemala, and Honduras
- Siegfried's rainforest toad (Albericus siegfriedi), a frog in the family Microhylidae endemic to Papua New Guinea
