= Choerophryne laurini =

Conservation status
- Least Concern (IUCN 3.1)

Scientific classification
- Kingdom: Animalia
- Phylum: Chordata
- Class: Amphibia
- Order: Anura
- Family: Microhylidae
- Genus: Choerophryne
- Species: C. laurini

Binomial name
- Choerophryne laurini (Günther, 2000)

Synonyms
- Albericus laurini Günther, 2000

Species of amphibian

Choerophryne laurini is a species of frogs in the family Microhylidae. It is endemic to Western New Guinea and known from the Wondiwoi Mountains, at the base of the Wandammen Peninsula. Common name Wandammen albericus frog has been suggested for it (it was formerly placed in the now-synonymized genus Albericus).

== Etymology ==
The specific name laurini refers to Laurin, a king of dwarves in the Nibelungenlied.

== Description ==
Adult males in the type series measure 16–17 mm (0.63–0.67 in) and the single female 19 mm (0.75 in) in snout–urostyle length. The snout is short and tapered. The fingers and toes bear relatively large discs. Skin has some warts. The dorsum is brownish with bright, yellowish spots and patches. There is a conspicuous yellow wart behind the mouth. The flanks are yellowish. The ventrum is blackish with many small whitish dots.

The male advertisement call is a pulsed note, uttered in long series. The dominant frequency is at 4–6 kHz.

Choerophryne laurini is only known from the area of its type locality, the Wondiwoi Mountains in West Papua, Indonesia

== Habitat and ecology ==
Choerophryne laurini inhabits dense primary rain forest at elevations of 800–960 m (2,620–3,150 ft) above sea level. Males call from trees and bushes some 1–3 m (3 ft 3 in – 9 ft 10 in) above the ground, either from inside curled leaves or on leaves.

This species can attain locally high densities, but its known range is very restricted. No threats to it have been identified. The species' range overlaps with the edge of Wandammen Nature Reserve.
