= Choerophryne brunhildae =

Conservation status
- Least Concern (IUCN 3.1)

Scientific classification
- Kingdom: Animalia
- Phylum: Chordata
- Class: Amphibia
- Order: Anura
- Family: Microhylidae
- Genus: Choerophryne
- Species: C. brunhildae

Binomial name
- Choerophryne brunhildae (Menzies, 1999)

Synonyms
- Albericus brunhildae Menzies, 1999

Species of frog

Choerophryne brunhildae is a species of frog in the family Microhylidae. It is endemic to Papua New Guinea and is known from the Adelbert Range, the Bewani Mountains, and the Hunstein Mountains.

== Etymology ==
This species was originally described in the genus Albericus, named for Alberich, the dwarf in Scandinavian mythology and Richard Wagner's opera cycle Der Ring des Nibelungen. Menzies named the species he described after Alberich's companions in the mythodology. The specific name brunhildae is derived from Brunhild.

== Description ==
Nine unsexed individuals in the type series measure 16.7–20.1 mm (0.66–0.79 in) in snout–urostyle length. Examination of six of these revealed one female and five males. For snout–vent length, their size range is 17.8–21.1 mm (0.70–0.83 in). Choerophryne brunhildae shares the general appearance of other former Albericus species: brown dorsum with lighter or darker irregular mottling, warty dorsal skin, and short and road head with blunt snout and relatively large eyes. Distinctive features of this species are conspicuous lumbar ocelli and ventrum that is densely stippled dark and light all over. One specimen was slightly greenish on the head.

The male advertisement call has been described as a "rubbery squeak". Note length is about 500 ms, and pulse rate varies within a note.

== Habitat and conservation ==
Choerophryne brunhildae lives in forest habitats and is sometimes seen in rural gardens. It has been recorded at elevations between 1,000–1,920 m (3,280–6,300 ft) above sea level. It can be locally common. No major threats to it are known as it seems to tolerate some habitat modification and plenty of suitable habitat remains.
