= Choerophryne exclamitans =

Conservation status
- Least Concern (IUCN 3.1)

Scientific classification
- Kingdom: Animalia
- Phylum: Chordata
- Class: Amphibia
- Order: Anura
- Family: Microhylidae
- Genus: Choerophryne
- Species: C. exclamitans

Binomial name
- Choerophryne exclamitans (Kraus and Allison, 2005)
- Choerophryne exclamitans was first found from slopes of Mount Shungol in the Morobe Province, Papua New Guinea.

Synonyms
- Albericus exclamitans Kraus and Allison, 2005

Species of amphibian

Choerophryne exclamitans is a species of frogs in the family Microhylidae. It is endemic to the Morobe Province of mainland Papua New Guinea and known from two locations on the slopes of Mount Shungol, its type locality, and from the Huon Peninsula.

== Description ==
Adult males measure 15–21 mm (0.59–0.83 in) and females 18–22 mm (0.71–0.87 in) in snout–vent length. The snout is bluntly rounded when viewed from above but truncate when viewed laterally. The eyes are moderately large. In males, the tympanum is hidden whereas it is visible in females. The dorsum and the sides are tan, mottled with dark brown or black. Females are generally lighter than most males. The venter is dark gray, peppered with light gray. The iris is bronze.

The male advertisement call is a rapid series of 3–48 peeping notes, emitted at an average rate of 4.7 notes per second. The dominant frequency is about 3.4 kHz.

== Habitat and conservation ==
Choerophryne exclamitans live in hill forests at elevations of 750–1,830 m (2,460–6,000 ft) above sea level. They have been observed on the upper leaf surfaces of shrubs or vines some 1 to 3 meters above the ground. Males call at night. Development is direct (i.e., there is no free-living larval stage).

No significant threats to this species are known. It is moderately common and occurs in the YUS Conservation Area.
