= Choerophryne gudrunae =

Conservation status
- Endangered (IUCN 3.1)

Scientific classification
- Kingdom: Animalia
- Phylum: Chordata
- Class: Amphibia
- Order: Anura
- Family: Microhylidae
- Genus: Choerophryne
- Species: C. gudrunae

Binomial name
- Choerophryne gudrunae (Menzies, 1999)

Synonyms
- Albericus gudrunae Menzies, 1999

Species of frog

Choerophryne gudrunae is a species of frog in the family Microhylidae. It is endemic to Papua New Guinea and is only known from its type locality near Kowat in the Adelbert Range, Madang Province.

== Etymology ==
This species was originally described in the genus Albericus, named for Alberich, the dwarf in Scandinavian mythology and Richard Wagner's opera cycle Der Ring des Nibelungen. Menzies named the species he described after Alberich's companions in the mythodology. The specific name gudrunae is derived from Gudrun.

== Description ==
Choerophryne gudrunae is a comparatively small species: three unsexed individuals in the type series measure 14.4–15.9 mm (0.57–0.63 in) in snout–urostyle length. Later examination of these has revealed them all as males, measuring 14.8–15.8 mm (0.58–0.62 in) in snout–vent length. Choerophryne gudrunae shares the general appearance of other former Albericus species: brown dorsum with lighter or darker irregular mottling, warty dorsal skin, and short and road head with blunt snout and relatively large eyes. Compared to other species with "click" calls, it has comparatively short forearms and long legs.

The male advertisement call is a short series of clicks (~10) emitted in rapid succession.

== Habitat and conservation ==
Choerophryne gudrunae is a poorly known species. The type locality is a hill forest at an elevation of about 900 m (3,000 ft) above sea level. Choerophryne gudrunae was quite common there. Shifting cultivation is a threat to its habitat.
