= Choerophryne gunnari =

Conservation status
- Least Concern (IUCN 3.1)

Scientific classification
- Kingdom: Animalia
- Phylum: Chordata
- Class: Amphibia
- Order: Anura
- Family: Microhylidae
- Genus: Choerophryne
- Species: C. gunnari

Binomial name
- Choerophryne gunnari (Menzies, 1999)

Synonyms
- Albericus gunnari Menzies, 1999

Species of frog

Choerophryne gunnari is a species of frog in the family Microhylidae. It is endemic to Papua New Guinea and is known from the area of its type locality in the Central Province, and from the western slopes of Mount Obree, also in the Central Province.

== Etymology ==
This species was originally described in the genus Albericus, named for Alberich, the dwarf in Scandinavian mythology and Richard Wagner's opera cycle Der Ring des Nibelungen. Menzies named the species he described after Alberich's companions in the mythodology. The specific name gunnari is derived from Gunnar.

== Description ==
Ten individuals in the type series measure 14.3–20.9 mm (0.56–0.82 in) in snout–urostyle length. The largest male was 16.4 mm (0.65 in) and the female was 21.2 mm (0.83 in) (reason for the discrepancy is unexplained). Six of the types were examined later and found to be males, measuring 15.4–21.7 mm (0.61–0.85 in) in snout–vent length. The dorsal surface has a large, dark hour-glass mark on a greyish background. The ventral ground colour is whitish, but the throat is dark in both males and females. The belly has a large, dark, intense blue blotch, and hind limbs are marked with blue blotches alternating between lighter and darker shades. This blue pigmentation is unique among all former Albericus species known at the time.

The male advertisement call is said to lack "musical quality". It is a series of "clicks" emitted at a mean rate of 240 min^{1}.

== Habitat and conservation ==
Choerophryne gunnari is a poorly known species. It has been found in foothill rainforest and undisturbed forest at elevations of 450–800 m (1,480–2,620 ft) above sea level. It can be quite common in undisturbed habitat but does not seem to tolerate habitat modification. Logging is a threat to its habitat, although there should still be plenty of suitable habitat available.
