= Choerophryne amomani =

Conservation status
- Data Deficient (IUCN 3.1)

Scientific classification
- Kingdom: Animalia
- Phylum: Chordata
- Class: Amphibia
- Order: Anura
- Family: Microhylidae
- Genus: Choerophryne
- Species: C. amomani

Binomial name
- Choerophryne amomani Günther, 2008
- Choerophryne amomani is only known from the island of Yapen, Indonesia.

Species of amphibian

Choerophryne amomani is a species of frogs in the family Microhylidae. It is endemic to the island of Yapen, off the north-western coast of New Guinea, and administratively a part of the Papua Province, Indonesia. The species is only known from the Amoman Mountain, its type locality, after which it is also named. Common name Amoman choerophryne has been suggested for it.

== Description ==
Adult males measure 12–15 mm (0.47–0.59 in) in snout–urostyle length; females are unknown. The snout is comparatively short (18–21% of the body length) and pointed. The eyes are relatively large. The tympanum is small. All fingers and toes bear discs. The overall ground colour is yellowish, greyish, or brownish, with brown, reddish or black markings and reticulations. Most specimens have an hour-glass marking on the dorsum, and many have a broad, light-coloured dorso-lateral stripe.

The male advertisement call consists of two, sometimes only one, long and rasping notes. The notes have two phases; first with low and then with high pulse repetition rate. The dominant frequency in some calls is at 4.1 kHz, while others have two dominant frequencies (at 3.5 and 4.4 kHz).

== Habitat and ecology ==
At the type locality, Choerophryne amomani inhabits primary and secondary rain forest at elevations of 1,050–1,200 m (3,440–3,940 ft) above sea level. It was found to be locally common. Males call from on or in leaf litter, rarely slightly higher (to 0.3 m above the ground) in hollow plant stems.

== Conservation ==
At lower altitudes of Yapen, this species is likely to be threatened by logging.
