= Choerophryne grylloides =

Scientific classification
- Kingdom: Animalia
- Phylum: Chordata
- Class: Amphibia
- Order: Anura
- Family: Microhylidae
- Genus: Choerophryne
- Species: C. grylloides

Binomial name
- Choerophryne grylloides Iannella, Oliver, and Richards, 2015
- Choerophryne grylloides is only known from the upper Sepik River basin, Papua New Guinea

Species of amphibian

Choerophryne grylloides is a small species of frog in the family Microhylidae. It is endemic to the upper Sepik River basin in the northern side of the New Guinea Highlands in Papua New Guinea. The specific name grylloides, from Latin gryllus ("cricket") and Greek suffix -oides ("resembles"), alludes to its cricket-like, high-pitched advertisement call.

== Description ==
This species is only known from two specimens: the holotype, an adult male, and other specimen that is tentatively (short of call or genetic data) assigned to this species. The holotype measures 12.5 mm (0.5 in) in snout–vent length, the other specimen is slightly smaller. The head is relatively narrow. The snout is slender with a rounded tip. The eyes are moderately small. The tympanic annulus is indistinct. All but the first finger have distinctly expanded discs. All toes have expanded terminal discs. Webbing is absent. Skin of the upper surfaces bear scattered low, rounded tubercules; the venter is smooth. The holotype, as seen at night, had black dorsal medial area, grading laterally to medium brown, and contrasting with the orangish-brown snout, thighs, and posterior of the dorsum. The flanks and limbs had extensive scattered pale grey-blue spots.

The male advertisement call is high-pitched, with dominant frequency of 4845–5115 Hz, giving it a cricket-like sound. Calls consist of 4–5 pulsed notes, the last of which has many more pulses than the previous notes.

== Habitat and conservation ==
Choerophryne grylloides is known from primary foothill rainforest at elevations of 440–900 m (1,440–2,950 ft) above sea level. The holotype was calling at night from the exposed surface of a leaf, about 30 cm (1 ft) above the ground.

Given the availability of suitable habitat, this species has probably a broad distribution along the northern slopes of the New Guinea Highlands. As of late 2019, it has not been assessed for the IUCN Red List of Threatened Species.
