= Choerophryne siegfriedi =

Conservation status
- Critically Endangered (IUCN 3.1)

Scientific classification
- Kingdom: Animalia
- Phylum: Chordata
- Class: Amphibia
- Order: Anura
- Family: Microhylidae
- Genus: Choerophryne
- Species: C. siegfriedi

Binomial name
- Choerophryne siegfriedi (Menzies, 1999)
- Choerophryne siegfriedi is only known from Mount Elimbari in the Simbu Province, Papua New Guinea.

Synonyms
- Albericus siegfriedi Menzies, 1999

Species of frog

Choerophryne siegfriedi is a species of frog in the family Microhylidae. It is endemic to Papua New Guinea and is only known from its type locality, Mount Elimbari in the Simbu Province.

== Etymology ==
This species was originally described in the genus Albericus, named for Alberich, the dwarf in Scandinavian mythology and Richard Wagner's opera cycle Der Ring des Nibelungen. Menzies named the species he described after Alberich's companions in the mythodology, in this case Siegfried.

== Description ==
The specimens in the type series (sex unspecified) were originally reported to measure 14–16 mm (0.55–0.63 in) in snout–urostyle length. Later examination of a subset of these, of which five are females and one is a male, gave much larger size, 18–21 mm (0.71–0.83 in) in snout–vent length. The reason for this large discrepancy is unknown. The ventral surface is reddish, yellowish, or whitish, with variable spotting or else uniformly dark.

Choerophryne siegfriedi is similar to Choerophryne darlingtoni, apart from the call that can be characterized as a "squeak", repeated in irregular series.

== Habitat and conservation ==
Choerophryne siegfriedi is known from montane rainforest at 2,400–2,500 m (7,900–8,200 ft) above sea level. Development is presumably direct; i.e., there is no free-living larval stage.

This species was quite common at the type locality. It is threatened by land clearance leading to habitat fragmentation. Bush fires are an additional threat. It is not known to occur in any protected area.
