= Choerophryne rhenaurum =

Conservation status
- Data Deficient (IUCN 3.1)

Scientific classification
- Kingdom: Animalia
- Phylum: Chordata
- Class: Amphibia
- Order: Anura
- Family: Microhylidae
- Genus: Choerophryne
- Species: C. rhenaurum

Binomial name
- Choerophryne rhenaurum (Menzies, 1999)
- Choerophryne rhenaurum is only known from the upper Ok Tedi catchment in the Western Province, Papua New Guinea.

Synonyms
- Albericus rhenaurum Menzies, 1999

Species of frog

Choerophryne rhenaurum is a species of frog in the family Microhylidae. It is endemic to Papua New Guinea and is only known from its type locality, Moiyokabip in the upper Ok Tedi catchment in the Western Province.

== Etymology ==
This species was originally described in the genus Albericus, named for Alberich, the dwarf in Scandinavian mythology and Richard Wagner's opera cycle Der Ring des Nibelungen. Menzies named the Albericus species he described after Alberich's companions in the mythodology, although rhenaurum is Latinized form of Rheingold.

== Description ==
The two specimens making the type series measure about 15 mm (0.59 in) in snout–urostyle length. Their sex was originally unspecified but later examination has shown them to be males. Choerophryne rhenaurum is similar to Choerophryne tuberculus but has a broader snout and advertisement call that has much longer pulse length (470–510 ms versus 250–350 ms in C. tuberculus). The call could be characterized as a "splutter".

== Habitat and conservation ==
Choerophryne siegfriedi is known from rainforest. The altitude of the type locality is variously given as 1,200 and 1,520 m (3,940 and 4,990 ft) above sea level. Development is presumably direct; i.e., there is no free-living larval stage.

This species was quite common at the type locality. Threats to it are unknown. It is not known to occur in any protected area.
