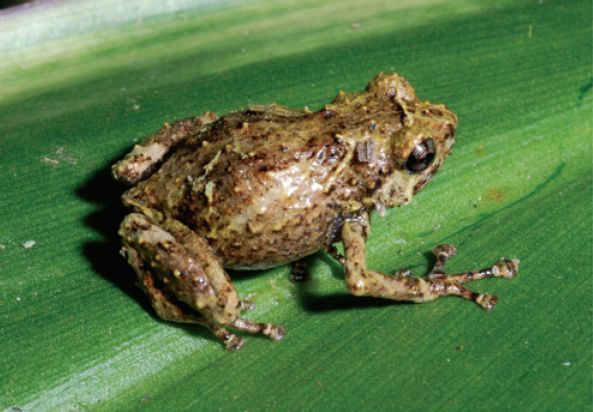
- Choerophryne murrita

Scientific classification
- Kingdom: Animalia
- Phylum: Chordata
- Class: Amphibia
- Order: Anura
- Family: Microhylidae
- Subfamily: Asterophryinae
- Genus: Choerophryne van Kampen, 1914

Species
- 39 (see text)

Synonyms
- Albericus Burton and Zweifel, 1995

= Choerophryne =

Genus of amphibians

Choerophryne is a genus of microhylid frogs, commonly known as Torricelli mountain frogs, endemic to New Guinea. These frogs are small, with the body length measured from snout to vent between 11 and 23 mm.

== Taxonomy and systematics ==
The distinction between Choerophryne and the former genus Albericus was based solely on the orientation of the alary processes of the premaxillae, giving the former its distinctive snout. In 2013 a new Choerophryne species was described with an orientation intermediate between the two genera, suggesting Albericus is likely a junior synonym of Choerophryne. Formal synonymisation of the two genera was suggested by Peloso and colleagues in 2016 based on molecular evidence.

== Etymology ==
The genus name of the junior synonym Albericus is the Latin form of Alberich, the shape-shifting dwarf in the epic poem Nibelungenlied. Several species derive also their specific names from Nibelungenlied, e.g. C. siegfriedi from Siegfried and C. fafniri from Fafnir.

== Species ==
Amphibian Species of the World assigns 39 species to Choerophryne, including the species previously assigned to the genus Albericus:

- Choerophryne alainduboisi Günther and Richards, 2018
- Choerophryne allisoni Richards and Burton, 2003
- Choerophryne alpestris (Kraus, 2010)
- Choerophryne amomani Günther, 2008
- Choerophryne arndtorum Günther, 2008
- Choerophryne bickfordi Kraus, 2018
- Choerophryne bisyllaba Günther and Richards, 2017
- Choerophryne brevicrus (Günther and Richards, 2012)
- Choerophryne brunhildae (Menzies, 1999)
- Choerophryne bryonopsis Kraus, 2013
- Choerophryne burtoni Richards, Dahl, and Hiaso, 2007
- Choerophryne crucifer Günther and Richards, 2017
- Choerophryne darlingtoni (Loveridge, 1948)
- Choerophryne epirrhina Iannella, Oliver, and Richards, 2015
- Choerophryne exclamitans (Kraus and Allison, 2005)
- Choerophryne fafniri (Menzies, 1999)
- Choerophryne frieda Günther & Richards, 2024
- Choerophryne gracilirostris Iannella, Richards, Oliver, 2014
- Choerophryne grylloides Iannella, Oliver, and Richards, 2015
- Choerophryne gudrunae (Menzies, 1999)
- Choerophryne gunnari (Menzies, 1999)
- Choerophryne hageni Günther & Richards, 2024
- Choerophryne laurini (Günther, 2000)
- Choerophryne longirostris Kraus and Allison, 2001
- Choerophryne microps Günther, 2008
- Choerophryne multisyllaba Günther and Richards, 2017
- Choerophryne murrita (Kraus and Allison, 2009)
- Choerophryne nigrescens Günther, 2008
- Choerophryne pandanicola (Günther and Richards, 2012)
- Choerophryne pipiens Günther, Richards, and Tjaturadi, 2018
- Choerophryne proboscidea Van Kampen, 1914
- Choerophryne rhenaurum (Menzies, 1999)
- Choerophryne rostellifer (Wandolleck, 1911)
- Choerophryne sanguinopicta (Kraus and Allison, 2005)
- Choerophryne siegfriedi (Menzies, 1999)
- Choerophryne swanhildae (Menzies, 1999)
- Choerophryne tubercula (Richards, Johnston, and Burton, 1992)
- Choerophryne valkuriarum (Menzies, 1999)
- Choerophryne variegata (Van Kampen, 1923)
