= Choerophryne burtoni =

Conservation status
- Least Concern (IUCN 3.1)

Scientific classification
- Kingdom: Animalia
- Phylum: Chordata
- Class: Amphibia
- Order: Anura
- Family: Microhylidae
- Genus: Choerophryne
- Species: C. burtoni

Binomial name
- Choerophryne burtoni Richards, Dahl, & Hiaso, 2007

Species of frog

Choerophryne burtoni is a species of frog in the family Microhylidae. It is endemic to Papua New Guinea.
