= Choerophryne sanguinopicta =

Conservation status
- Critically Endangered (IUCN 3.1)

Scientific classification
- Kingdom: Animalia
- Phylum: Chordata
- Class: Amphibia
- Order: Anura
- Family: Microhylidae
- Genus: Choerophryne
- Species: C. sanguinopicta

Binomial name
- Choerophryne sanguinopicta (Kraus and Allison, 2005)

Synonyms
- Albericus sanguinopictus Kraus and Allison, 2005

Species of amphibian

Choerophryne sanguinopicta is a species of frogs in the family Microhylidae. It is endemic to southeastern Papua New Guinea and only known from the vicinity of its type locality, the northern slope of Mt. Simpson in the Owen Stanley Range, Milne Bay Province, although it is expected to occur more widely. The specific name sanguinopictus, from Latin for sanguis ("blood") and pictus ("painted") refers to the distinctive red blotching and punctations characteristic for this species.

== Description ==
Adult males measure 23–27 mm (0.91–1.06 in) and females 28–33 mm (1.1–1.3 in) in snout–vent length. The snout bluntly is rounded. The eyes are moderately large. The tympanum is small. The fingers and toes are unwebbed but have terminal discs. The dorsum is pale blue or green and heavily covered with dark brown blotches and flecks and minute brick red punctations. The venter is paler bluish green and has bright brick red or orange-red blotches. Some specimens may have more yellow-orange tinge in the ground color.

== Habitat and conservation ==
Its natural habitat is primary lower montane forest where it prefers forest clearings and forest and river edges. The altitudinal range is 1,400–1,540 m (4,590–5,050 ft) above sea level. Males call at night, perched on leaves and stems some 1–3 m above the ground.

This species is threatened by frequent fires set in its habitat to improve hunting. It was abundant at the type locality but appears patchily distributed.

Choerophryne sanguinopicta is only known from Mt. Simpson in the Owen Stanley Range, Papua New Guinea.
