= Choerophryne rostellifer =

Conservation status
- Least Concern (IUCN 3.1)

Scientific classification
- Kingdom: Animalia
- Phylum: Chordata
- Class: Amphibia
- Order: Anura
- Family: Microhylidae
- Genus: Choerophryne
- Species: C. rostellifer

Binomial name
- Choerophryne rostellifer (Wandolleck, 1911)

Synonyms
- Copiula (?) rostellifer Wandolleck, 1911 "1910"; Cophixalus rostellifer (Wandolleck, 1911)

Species of frog

Choerophryne rostellifer, also known as the Torricelli Mountain frog, is a species of frog in the family Microhylidae. It is endemic to New Guinea and currently only known from Papua New Guinea, with records from the coastal ranges in the north, between the Adelbert Range in the east and the Bewani Mountains in the west, and further southward to the Star Mountains. Some records are from close to the Indonesian border, and it is probable that this species is to be found also in Western New Guinea.

Choerophryne rostellifer occurs in the interior and edge of tropical rainforest at elevations below 1,300 m (4,300 ft). Development is direct; i.e., there is no free-living larval stage.

Choerophryne rostellifer is a widespread species that can be locally abundant. There are no known major threats to it, and its range overlaps with some protected areas.
