= Choerophryne gracilirostris =

Scientific classification
- Kingdom: Animalia
- Phylum: Chordata
- Class: Amphibia
- Order: Anura
- Family: Microhylidae
- Genus: Choerophryne
- Species: C. gracilirostris

Binomial name
- Choerophryne gracilirostris Iannella, Richards and Oliver, 2014

Species of amphibian

Choerophryne gracilirostris is a tiny (13–15 mm long), little-studied species of frog in the family Microhylidae. It is endemic to the rainforest of the Western and Southern Highlands provinces of Papua New Guinea. Choerophryne gracilirostris can be distinguished by its long narrow snout and advertisement call of 3-5 pulsed notes in long repeated sequences. Males can be found calling from within leaf litter or rotting logs, especially on rainy nights.
