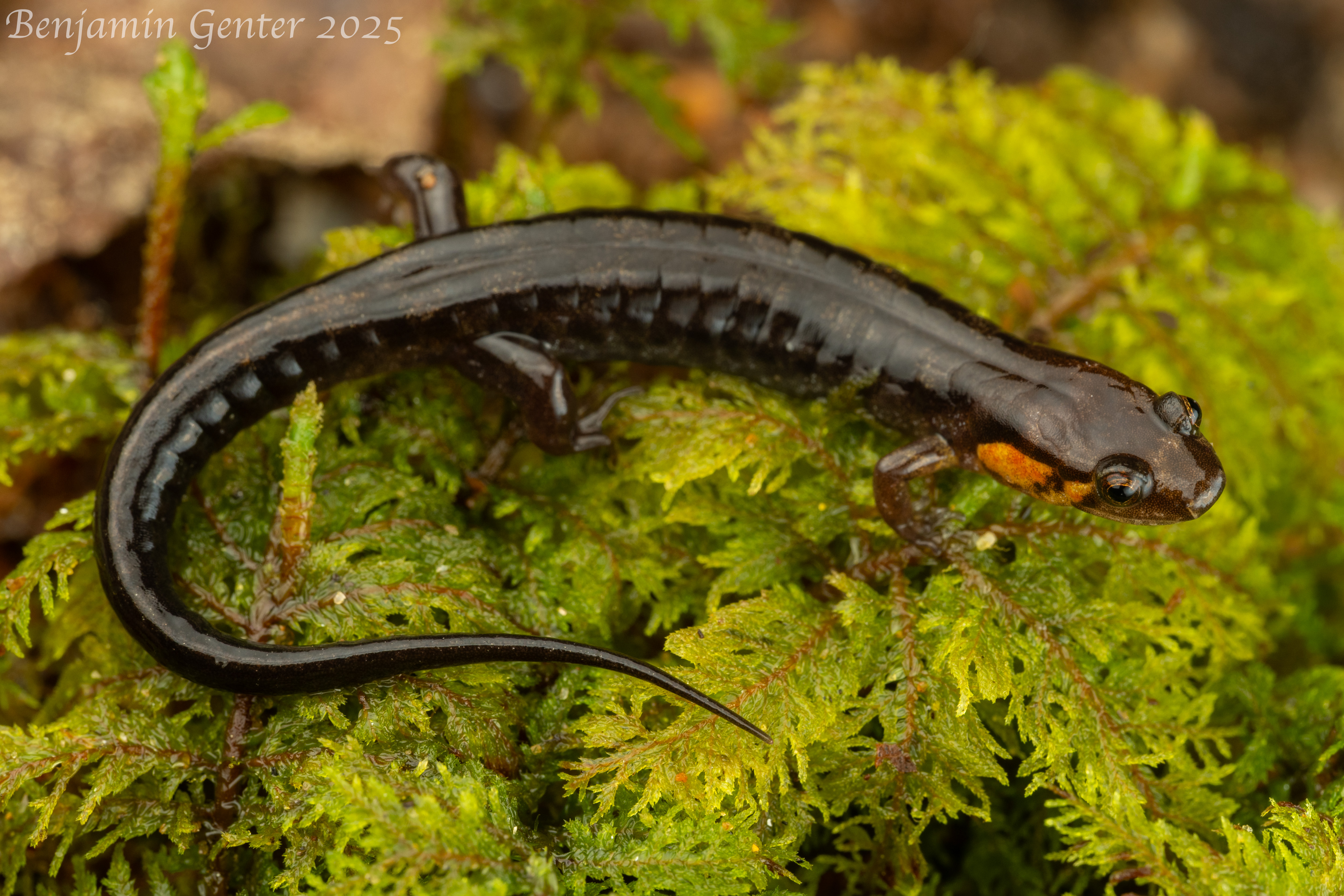

Conservation status
- Near Threatened (IUCN 3.1)

Scientific classification
- Kingdom: Animalia
- Phylum: Chordata
- Class: Amphibia
- Order: Urodela
- Family: Plethodontidae
- Genus: Desmognathus
- Species: D. imitator

Binomial name
- Desmognathus imitator Dunn, 1927

Synonyms
- Desmognathus fuscus imitator Dunn, 1927; Desmognathus aureatagulus Weller, 1930

= Imitator salamander =

Species of amphibian

The imitator salamander (Desmognathus imitator) is a species of salamander in the family Plethodontidae. It is endemic to the Appalachian Mountains in the southeastern United States.

== Description ==
The imitator salamander is dark brown or blackish, sometimes with a pale intermittent stripe down its back and a pale line joining eye to jaw. It often has red or orange cheek patches and its hind legs are more stocky than its forelegs.

== Distribution and habitat ==
The imitator salamander is found in the Appalachian Mountains in Tennessee and North Carolina at elevations more than 900 m (3,000 ft) above sea level. Its range extends from the Great Smoky Mountains in the north to the Plott Balsams and the Great Balsam Mountains in the south. Its habitat is the banks of streams, wet rocks, and the forest floor at higher altitudes. It shares its range with the Ocoee salamander (Desmognathus ocoee) but is usually found closer to water.

== Biology ==
The imitator salamander is not toxic but is thought to be a Batesian mimic of the red-cheeked salamander (Plethodon jordani), a noxious species. Adult imitator salamanders hide during the day and emerge at night to forage for small invertebrates. They are probably preyed on by birds, mammals, snakes and the spring salamander (Gyrinophilus porphyriticus).

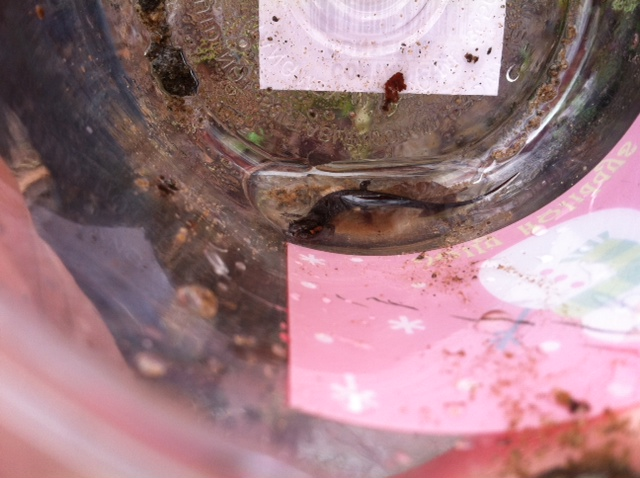
Specimen showing mimicry of the red-cheeked salamander

The imitator salamander breeds in summer, and a clutch of about 20 eggs is laid and attached to the underside of a rock in a seepage or other wet location. The female broods the eggs, and when they hatch the larvae may live among wet moss, under rocks and among leaf litter. Little is known of their development, but they are assumed to eat small invertebrates and undergo metamorphosis into juveniles around 10 months old.

== Status ==
The imitator salamander is listed as "near threatened" by the IUCN Red List of Threatened Species, because although the total size of the population is unknown, the number of salamanders seems to be stable. The species is offered some protection because most of its range is inside the boundaries of national parks, but a small separate population on Waterrock Knob is threatened by local extinction. The Great Smoky Mountains have a high deposition of acid rain, but no evidence shows this is affecting the salamander population.
