= Choerophryne epirrhina =

Scientific classification
- Kingdom: Animalia
- Phylum: Chordata
- Class: Amphibia
- Order: Anura
- Family: Microhylidae
- Genus: Choerophryne
- Species: C. epirrhina

Binomial name
- Choerophryne epirrhina Iannella, Oliver and Richards, 2015

Species of amphibian

Choerophryne epirrhina is a small (14.9-15.0 mm), little-known species of frog in the family Microhylidae. It is endemic to the northern side of the central cordillera of Papua New Guinea, at altitudes of around 850m. Choerophryne epirrhina has an elongated snout and advertisement call of 3-4 pulsed notes in long repeated sequences. Males can be found calling from within leaf litter after rain at night.
