= Choerophryne arndtorum =

Conservation status
- Data Deficient (IUCN 3.1)

Scientific classification
- Kingdom: Animalia
- Phylum: Chordata
- Class: Amphibia
- Order: Anura
- Family: Microhylidae
- Genus: Choerophryne
- Species: C. arndtorum

Binomial name
- Choerophryne arndtorum Günther, 2008
- Choerophryne arndtorum is only known from the island of Yapen, Indonesia.

Species of amphibian

Choerophryne arndtorum is a species of frogs in the family Microhylidae. It is endemic to the island of Yapen, off the north-western coast of New Guinea and belonging to the Papua Province, Indonesia. It is known from the Waira Mountain, its type locality near Serai, and from another locality further east. Common name Arndt's choerophryne has been suggested for it. The specific name is plural genitive and honours Dr. Rudolf G. Arndt and his family.

== Description ==
Adult males measure 11–15 mm (0.43–0.59 in) in snout–urostyle length; females are unknown. The snout is long and pointed (7–9% of the body length). The eyes are relatively large. The tympanum is small. All fingers and toes expect the first ones bear discs. The dorsum is reddish, greyish, or brownish, while the ventrum is grey-brown, blackish, or brownish. Most specimens have an hour-glass marking on the dorsum, and many have a broad, light-coloured dorso-lateral stripe.

The male advertisement call is a series of typically four (range 1–5) distinctly pulsed notes. Each note consists of 22 to 44 pulses, with dominant frequency at 5.1 kHz.

== Habitat and ecology ==
At the type locality, Choerophryne arndtorum inhabits primary and secondary rain forest at elevations of 500–700 m (1,600–2,300 ft) above sea level. It was found to be locally common, with 150 calling males found in a half hectare area. Males call from on or in leaf litter, sometimes higher from the ground (to 1.2 m) on plant stems. Development is direct (i.e., there is no free-living larval stage).

== Conservation ==
Logging is a potential threat to this species, especially at lower altitudes.
