= Choerophryne darlingtoni =

Conservation status
- Least Concern (IUCN 3.1)

Scientific classification
- Kingdom: Animalia
- Phylum: Chordata
- Class: Amphibia
- Order: Anura
- Family: Microhylidae
- Genus: Choerophryne
- Species: C. darlingtoni

Binomial name
- Choerophryne darlingtoni (Loveridge, 1948)

Synonyms
- Cophixalus biroi darlingtoni Loveridge, 1948; Cophixalus darlingtoni — Zweifel, 1956; Albericus darlingtoni — Burton and Zweifel, 1995

Species of frog

Choerophryne darlingtoni is a species of frog in the family Microhylidae. It is currently endemic to Papua New Guinea and found in the New Guinea Highlands. The specific name darlingtoni honors P. Jackson Darlington Jr., an American evolutionary biologist and zoogeographer. Common name Darlington's rainforest frog has been coined for it.

== Description ==
Choerophryne darlingtoni grows to a maximum snout–vent length of 27 mm (1.1 in). The snout is blunt, similar in length to the eye. The fifth toe is longer than the third. Coloration is highly variable. A thin vertebral line or a broad light vertebral stripe may be present. The dorsal ground color varies from deep plumbeous to pale yellowish tan. Various darker markings are present. A pale, golden interocular line is almost always present but is sometimes indistinct. The venter is pale and nearly immaculate to grey.

Choerophryne darlingtoni is not morphologically distinguishable from Choerophryne fafniri but is distinguishable by the male advertisement call. It is also similar to Choerophryne variegata.

== Habitat and conservation ==
Its natural habitats are montane forests at elevations above 2,000 m (6,600 ft). It is a locally abundant species but can be locally threatened by habitat loss caused by selective logging and forest clearance.
