= Curt von Hagen =

German officer, tobacco planter and colonial official (1859–1897)

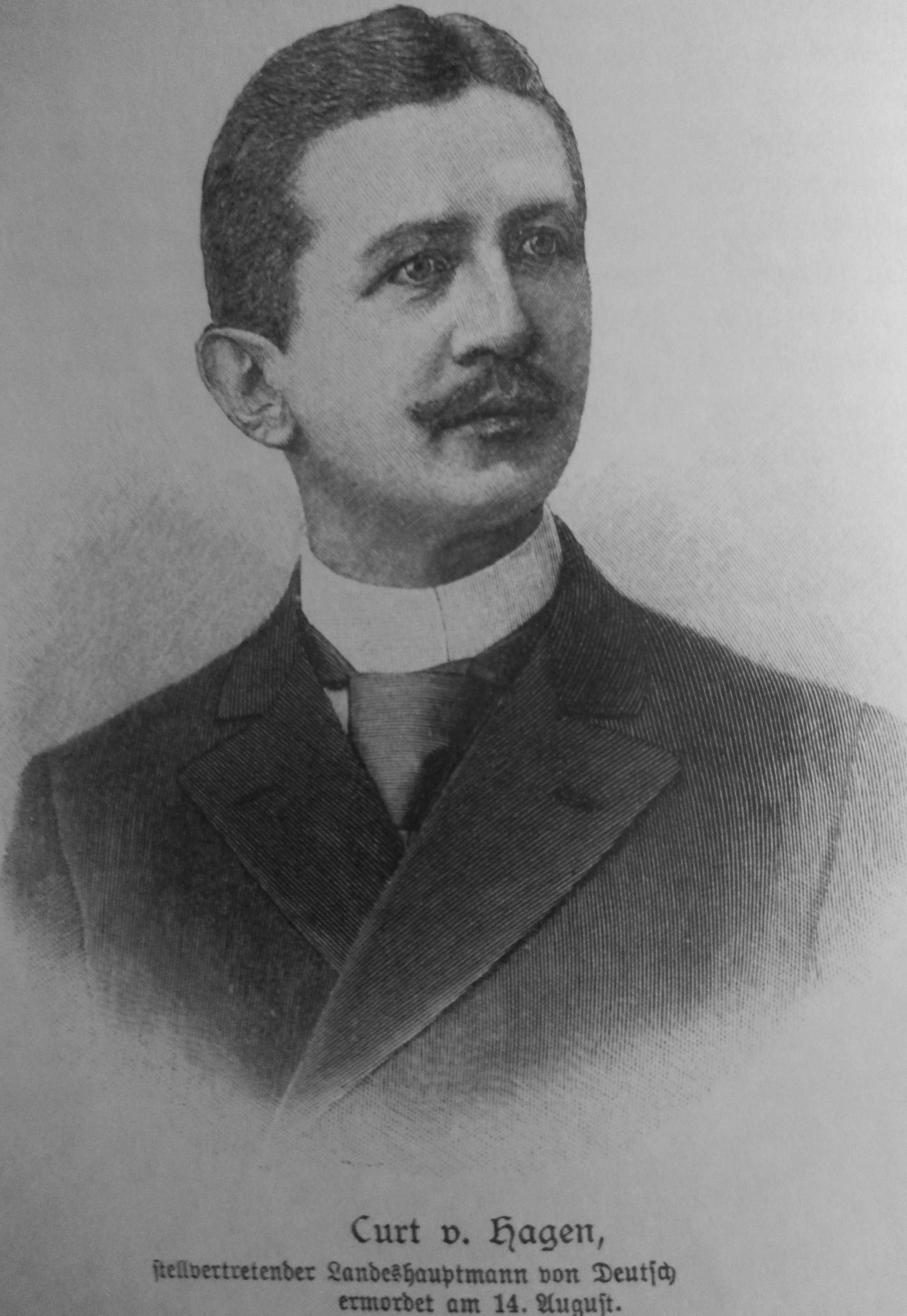

Landeshauptmann of the German New Guinea Company
- In office 22 September 1896 – 13 August 1897
- Monarch: Wilhelm II
- Chancellor: Chlodwig von Hohenlohe-Schillingsfürst
- Director of the Colonial Department (Note: Depending on the State Secretary for Foreign Affairs.): Paul Kayser; Oswald von Richthofen
- Preceded by: Hugo Rüdiger
- Succeeded by: Albert Hahl (Acting)

Personal details
- Born: 12 September 1859 Schippenbeil (East Prussia), Kingdom of Prussia, German Confederation
- Died: 13 August 1897 (aged 37) Near Friedrich-Wilhelmshafen, German New Guinea
- Spouse: Helene Winkler (m. 1881)
- Children: 1
- Occupation: Officer, tobacco planter and colonial official

Curt von Hagen (Schippenbeil, 12 September 1859 – near Friedrich-Wilhelmshafen, 13 August 1897) was a German officer, tobacco planter and colonial official in the newly developed German New Guinea, where he last worked for the colonial administration as Landeshauptmann of the German New Guinea Company.

== Family ==
Curt von Hagen was the son of the Prussian Generalleutnant Heinrich von Hagen (1831–1905), the founder of the noble von Hagen family, and he was the grandson of the novelist and first professor of aesthetics and art history at the University of Königsberg, Ernst August Hagen (1797–1880). A great-grandfather was the court pharmacist, polymath and friend and discussant of Immanuel Kant, Karl Gottfried Hagen (1749–1829).

In 1881 he married Helene Winkler, daughter of a factory owner. The only child of this marriage was a daughter, Else, who chose a middle-class spouse.

== Life ==
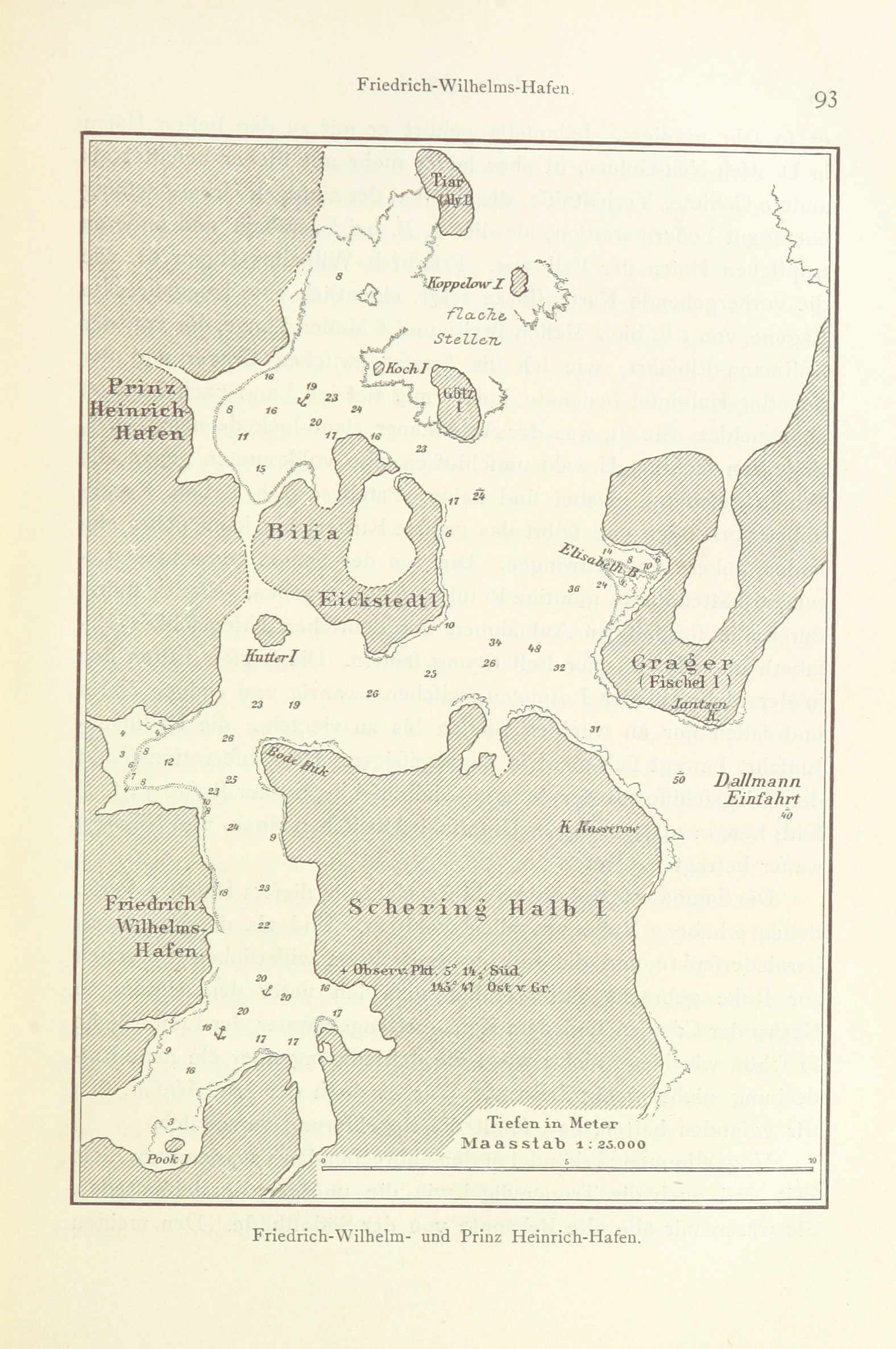
Friedrich-Wilhelmshafen Harbour, 1884–1885.

Curt von Hagen followed his father's military career and joined the Prussian Army as a field artillery officer in 1878. He had to leave the army in 1886 after a riding accident. To make a fresh start, he tried to become an independent tobacco grower. However, the joint-stock company founded in Deli (Sumatra) soon went bankrupt. From 1893 onwards he was the chief administrator of the Jomba tobacco plantation for the Astrolabe Company near Friedrich-Wilhelmshafen in German New Guinea.

Just three years later, Hagen, who was considered a capable administrator, was general director of the German New Guinea Company. He gave up its station in Friedrich-Wilhelmshafen in the same year and moved it to Stephansort, where he had a new port facility and the Erima station built. This involved the relocation of all officials. All of this was his responsibility, as he had become acting Landeshauptmann on 22 September 1896.

On a business trip to Herbertshöhe in May 1897, von Hagen learned from Albert Hahl of the 1895 murder of the travel writer Otto Ehrenfried Ehlers and some of the police soldiers accompanying him. In July 1897, the two ringleaders, Ranga and Opia, were arrested on von Hagen's initiative and imprisoned in Stephansort. But the two managed to escape. During a robbery and murder of a Chinese merchant, they stole rifles. At the beginning of August, von Hagen and other colonists organized a pursuit. The group set out inland on the morning of 13 August near the Jomba tobacco plantation. A few hours later, Hagen was fatally shot by Ranga. Five days after the Imperial German Navy had bombarded the island with the cruiser Falke, the locals killed the two murderers and, after handing them over to the colonial administration, placed their heads on display in Stephansort on 19 August as a deterrent.

In 1899, von Hagen's widow had difficulty obtaining a pension because the German New Guinea Company took the position that von Hagen himself was to blame for his death, since it was not his job to carry out punitive expeditions. 600 Marks were finally approved for the widow and 150 Marks for the daughter.

A memorial with a bronze eagle was erected for Curt von Hagen (5.28°S 145.45°E). This eagle was dismantled in 1956 and placed on a new monument in Mount Hagen (5.52°S 144.13°E), which was named after him and is now the capital of the Western Highlands Province. Since around 1990, an imprecise replica of the Imperial Eagle has been on this monument. Likewise, the 3,765 m high volcano Hagensberg (5.75°S 144.33°E; the second highest volcano on the Australian continent) is named after Curt von Hagen.

== Bibliography ==
- (in German) Dieter Kleinhanß: Hagen – Die Geschichte einer Familie. Von Schippenbeil bis Königsberg und rund um die Welt nach Berlin und Kassel. BoD, Norderstedt 2021, ISBN 978-3-7543-4405-7.
- (in German) Siegfried Hagen: Dreihundert Jahre Hagen’sche Familiengeschichte. Zusammengestellt auf Grund vorhandener Familienbücher, Akten, Dokumente und der Stammliste der ostpreußischen Familie Hagen. 2 Bände. Selbstverlag, Kassel 1938. Literature by and about Curt von Hagen in the German National Library catalogue
- (in German) Gothaisches Genealogisches Taschenbuch der Adeligen Häuser. Alter Adel und Briefadel. 1921. 15. Jahrgang. Justus Perthes, Gotha 1920, S. 289; Curt von Hagen is available for free viewing and download at the Internet Archive.
- (in German) W. Apitzsch: Curt v. Hagen: Ein ostpreußischer Kulturpionier in der Südsee. In: Kol. Blätter, VIII. Jg., Hrsg. Kolonial-Abteilung des Auswärtigen Amtes, Ernst Siegfried Mittler & Sohn, Berlin 1897. Reprint 2015.
- (in German) Die Bestrafung der Mörder des Landeshauptmanns von Hagen. In: Berliner Lokal-Anzeiger, 12. Dezember 1897.

Government offices
Preceded by Hugo Rüdiger	Landeshauptmann of the German New Guinea Company; 1896–1897	Succeeded by Albert Hahl; Acting
