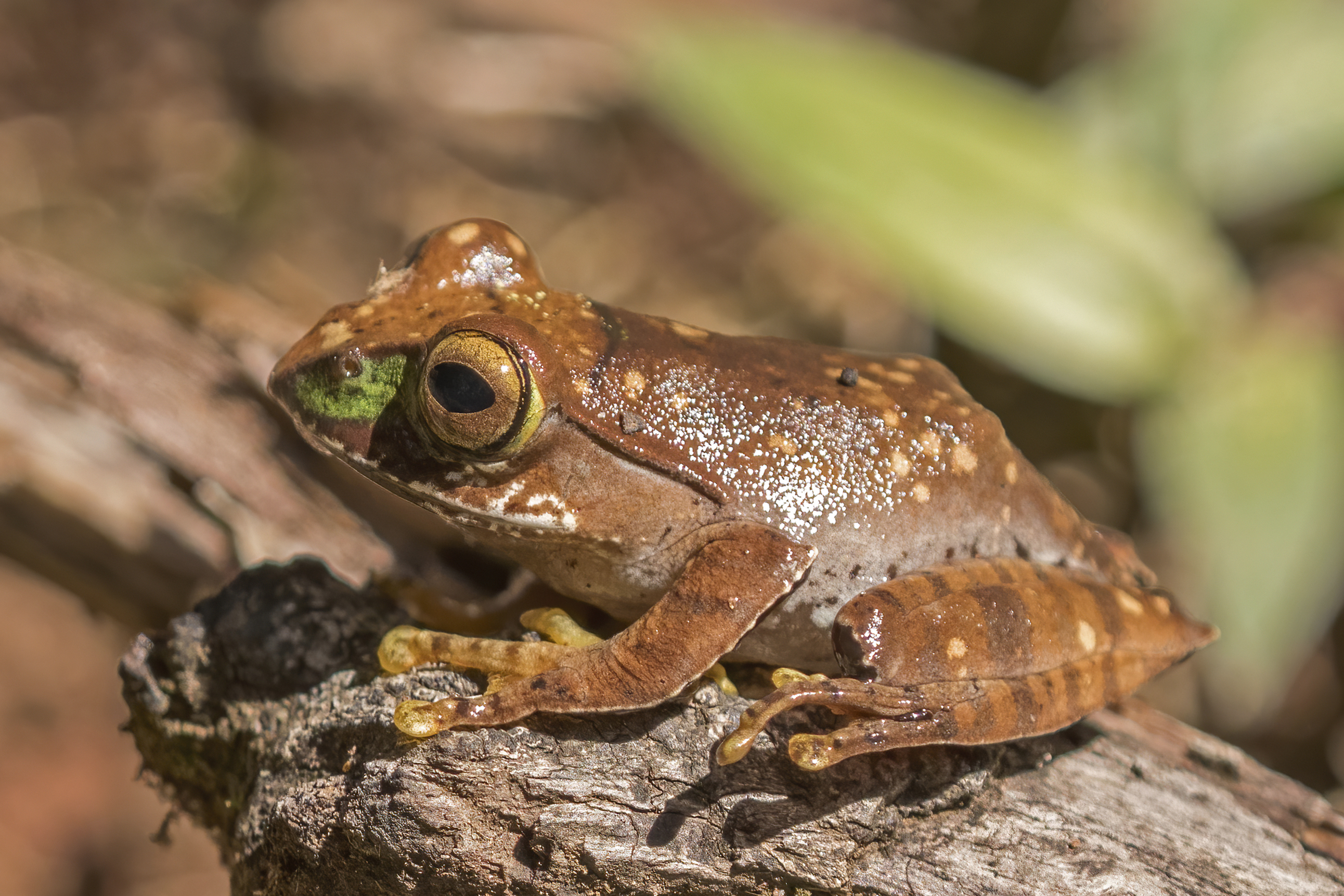
- Ranomafana National Park

Conservation status
- Least Concern (IUCN 3.1)

Scientific classification
- Kingdom: Animalia
- Phylum: Chordata
- Class: Amphibia
- Order: Anura
- Family: Mantellidae
- Genus: Boophis
- Species: B. madagascariensis

Binomial name
- Boophis madagascariensis (Peters, 1874)

= Boophis madagascariensis =

Species of frog

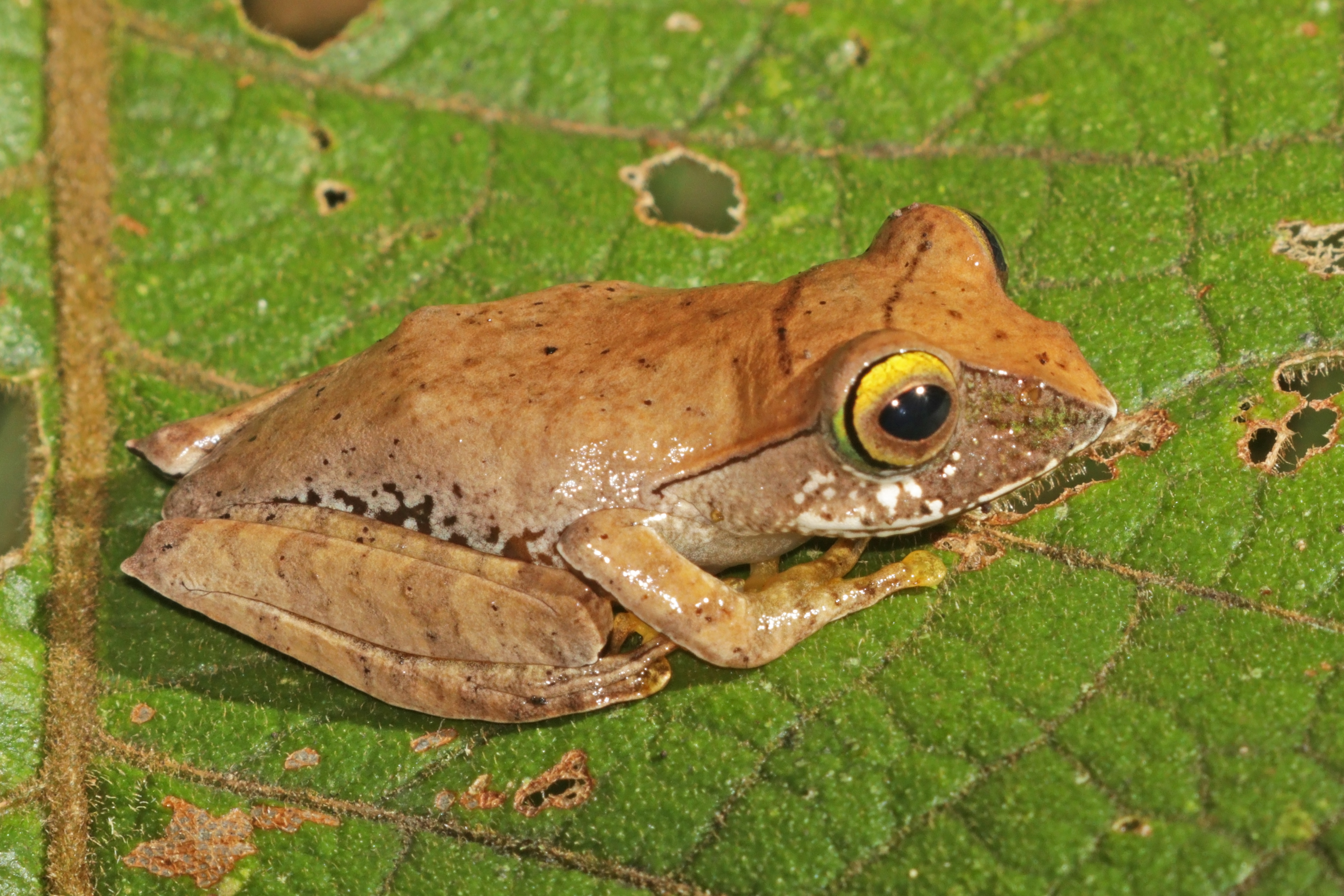
juvenile, Ranomafana NP

Boophis madagascariensis is a species of frog in the family Mantellidae. It is endemic to Madagascar. Its natural habitats are subtropical or tropical moist lowland forests, subtropical or tropical moist montane forests, rivers, freshwater marshes, intermittent freshwater marshes, and heavily degraded former forest. It is threatened by habitat loss.
