= Hagen Mountains (New Guinea) =

Mountain range in Papua New Guinea

- Location within Papua New Guinea

Highest point
- Peak: Mount Hagen (Hagensberg)
- Elevation: 3,778 m (12,395 ft)

Geography
- State: Papua-New Guinea
- Range coordinates: 5°44′S 144°03′E
- Parent range: Island of New Guinea

The Hagen Mountains (German: Hagengebirge) are a mountain range over 3,000 metres high in Papua-New Guinea, in the northeast of the island of New Guinea. The range lies on the territory of the former German colony of German New Guinea in the Kaiser-Wilhelmsland, west of and parallel to the middle Ramu valley. It was discovered in 1896 and named after Curt von Hagen, then director general (Generaldirektor) of the New Guinea Company and governor of German New Guinea. Curt von Hagen's father was the royal adjutant and lieutenant-general, Heinrich von Hagen; Curt von Hagen was thus a great grandson of the polymath, Karl Gottfried Hagen, of Königsberg.

The Hagen Mountains are a relatively compact massif of volcanic origin. Their highest peak is the 3,778-metre-high Mount Hagen (Hagensberg), after which the town of Mount Hagen, 25 kilometres to the southeast, is named.

== Sources ==
- "Hagengebirge". Deutsches Kolonial-Lexikon. 1920. Archived from the original on 2007-07-06.
- "Kaiser-Wilhelmsland". Deutsches Kolonial-Lexikon. 1920. Archived from the original on 2013-10-29.
- Mount Hagen, Peakbagger.com, retrieved 11 October 2011
