= Mount Hagen (volcano) =

Volcano in Papua New Guinea

- Location within Papua New Guinea

Highest point
- Elevation: 3,796 m (12,454 ft)
- Prominence: 1,082 m (3,550 ft)
- Listing: Volcanoes in Papua New Guinea, Ribu
- Coordinates: 5°46′S 144°02′E

Geography
- Location: Western Highlands and Enga Provinces, Papua New Guinea
- Parent range: Hagen Mountains

Geology
- Rock age: 210,000–380,000 years
- Mountain type: Eroded stratovolcano
- Last eruption: ~ 210,000 years ago

Mount Hagen (German: Hagensberg), named after the German colonial officer Curt von Hagen (1859–1897), is the second highest volcano in Papua New Guinea and on the Australian continent, ranking behind only its neighbour Mount Giluwe which is roughly 35 kilometres (22 mi) to the south-west. It is located on the border between the Western Highlands and Enga Provinces, about 24 kilometres (15 mi) north-west of the city of Mount Hagen for which it is named.

Mount Hagen is an old stratovolcano which has been heavily eroded during several Pleistocene glaciations. The maximum extent of the glaciers on Hagen was less than half that on the much higher Mount Giluwe, covering an area of up to 50 km^{2} (19 sq mi) and extending down below 3,400 m (11,000 ft).

== See also ==
- Volcanic Seven Summits
