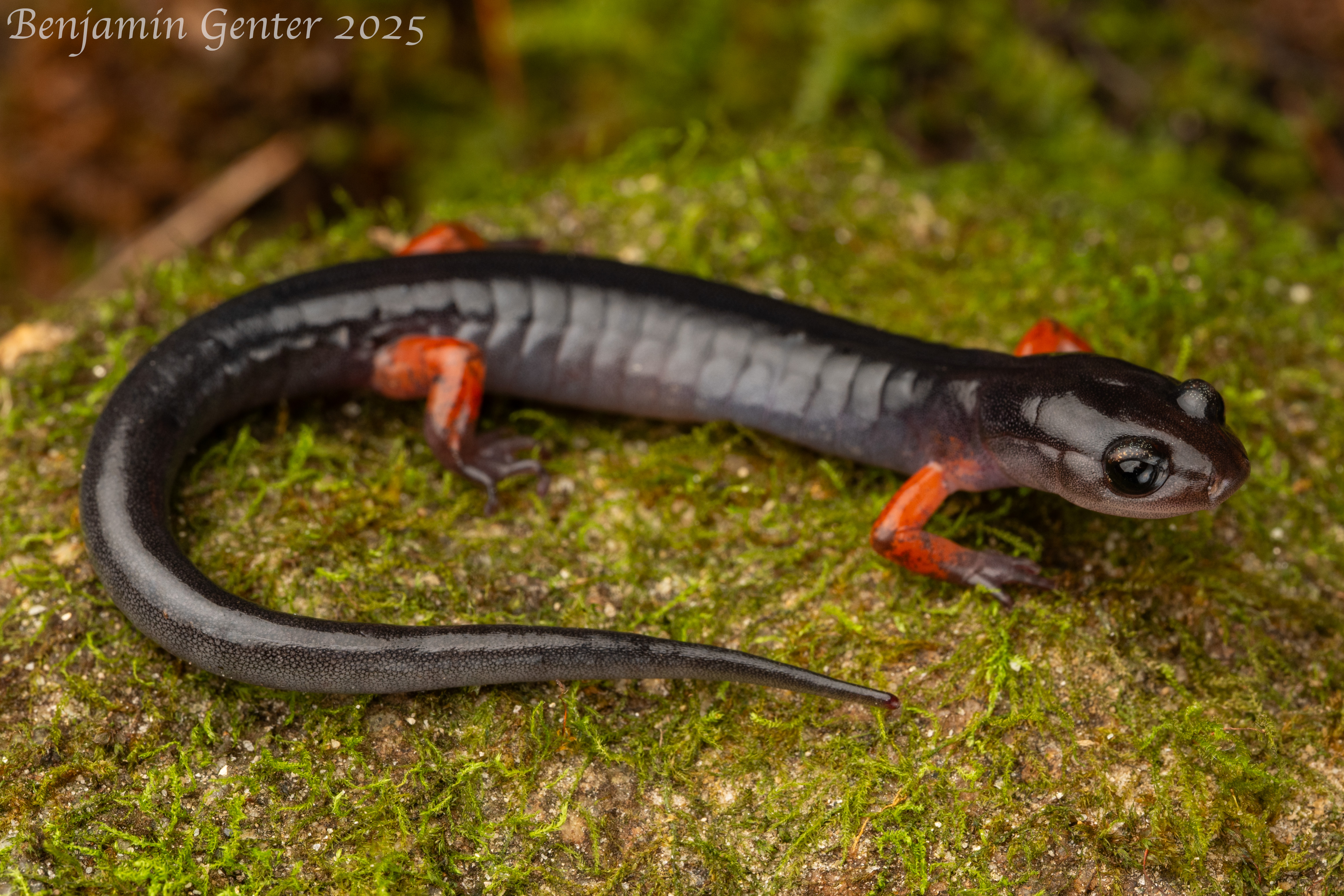

Conservation status
- Near Threatened (IUCN 3.1)

Scientific classification
- Kingdom: Animalia
- Phylum: Chordata
- Class: Amphibia
- Order: Urodela
- Family: Plethodontidae
- Genus: Plethodon
- Species: P. shermani

Binomial name
- Plethodon shermani Stejneger, 1906

= Red-legged salamander =

Species of amphibian

The red-legged salamander (Plethodon shermani) is a species of salamander in the family Plethodontidae. Formerly considered a subspecies of Plethodon jordani, it is native to the mountain forests of the southeastern United States.

== Description ==
Red-legged salamanders tend to be somewhere between 85-185mm in length and are characterized by their slate-grey to bluish-black bodies and red coloration on their dorsal side of their legs. In the Unicoi Mountains it rarely has red coloration on the legs, but has lateral white spotting. Sexually active males have obvious, rounded mental glands. Young juveniles may have paired red spots running along the back. It is a terrestrial breeder.

== Habitat ==
The red-legged salamanders make their habitats in cool, moderately humid forests in areas of high elevation, such as the Unicoi and Nantahala mountains as well as the southern Appalachians. While the species is mainly concentrated in North Carolina, they are also found in northern Georgia and southeast Tennessee. Due to being indigenous to less than five known regions, the species has been labeled as vulnerable to extinction. This species shelters under logs or rocks by day, and forages on the forest floor at night.

== Diet ==
The red-legged salamander is a nocturnal forager that consumes a wide variety of small invertebrates found on the forest floor.

== Conservation actions ==
Most of the range occurs in the Nantahala National Forest, where some clear cutting also occurs. Benefits of the species should come with the conservation actions being taken. The species does not appear to be on any state or federal list of endangered species.

Red-legged salamanders are relatively resilient to disturbances such as those associated with timbering operations, and are frequently found in second-growth forests and relatively small, fragmented woodlots.
