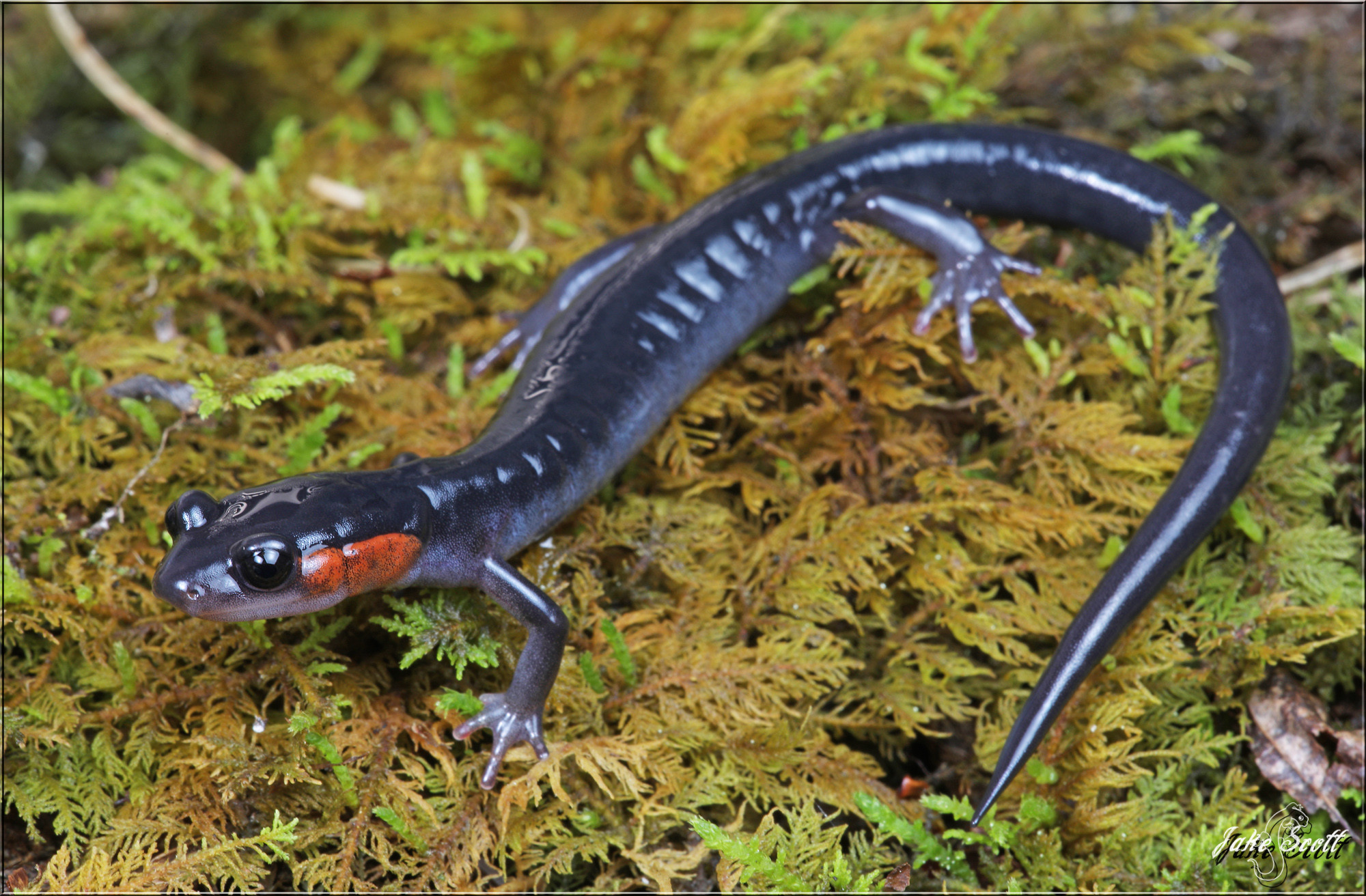

Conservation status
- Near Threatened (IUCN 3.1)

Scientific classification
- Kingdom: Animalia
- Phylum: Chordata
- Class: Amphibia
- Order: Urodela
- Family: Plethodontidae
- Genus: Plethodon
- Species: P. jordani

Binomial name
- Plethodon jordani Blatchley, 1901

= Red-cheeked salamander =

Species of amphibian

The red-cheeked salamander (Plethodon jordani), also known as the Jordan's salamander, Jordan's redcheek salamander, or Appalachian woodland salamander, is a species of salamander in the family Plethodontidae. It is endemic to the Appalachian Mountains in the southeastern United States.

== Description ==
The red-cheeked salamander is a uniform steely grey colour with conspicuous red, orange or yellow patches on the side of the head. The imitator salamander (Desmognathus imitator) is thought to be a mimic and is very similar in appearance but has a pale line joining jaw to eye and more robust hind legs.

== Distribution and habitat ==
The red-cheeked salamander is found in mountainous areas of the southeastern United States. The main populations are along the border between North Carolina and Tennessee, but separate populations occur in Rabun County, Georgia. The altitude range is 210 to 1950 metres (700 to 6400 ft), but a few specimens are found below 600 metres (2,000 ft). Almost the whole altitude range occurs within the boundaries of the Great Smoky Mountains National Park. The red-cheeked salamander is a terrestrial species and is found in both hardwood and coniferous forests, particularly in the Southern Appalachian spruce–fir forest. It is plentiful in areas with a ground cover of moss and leaf litter among large boulders.

== Biology ==
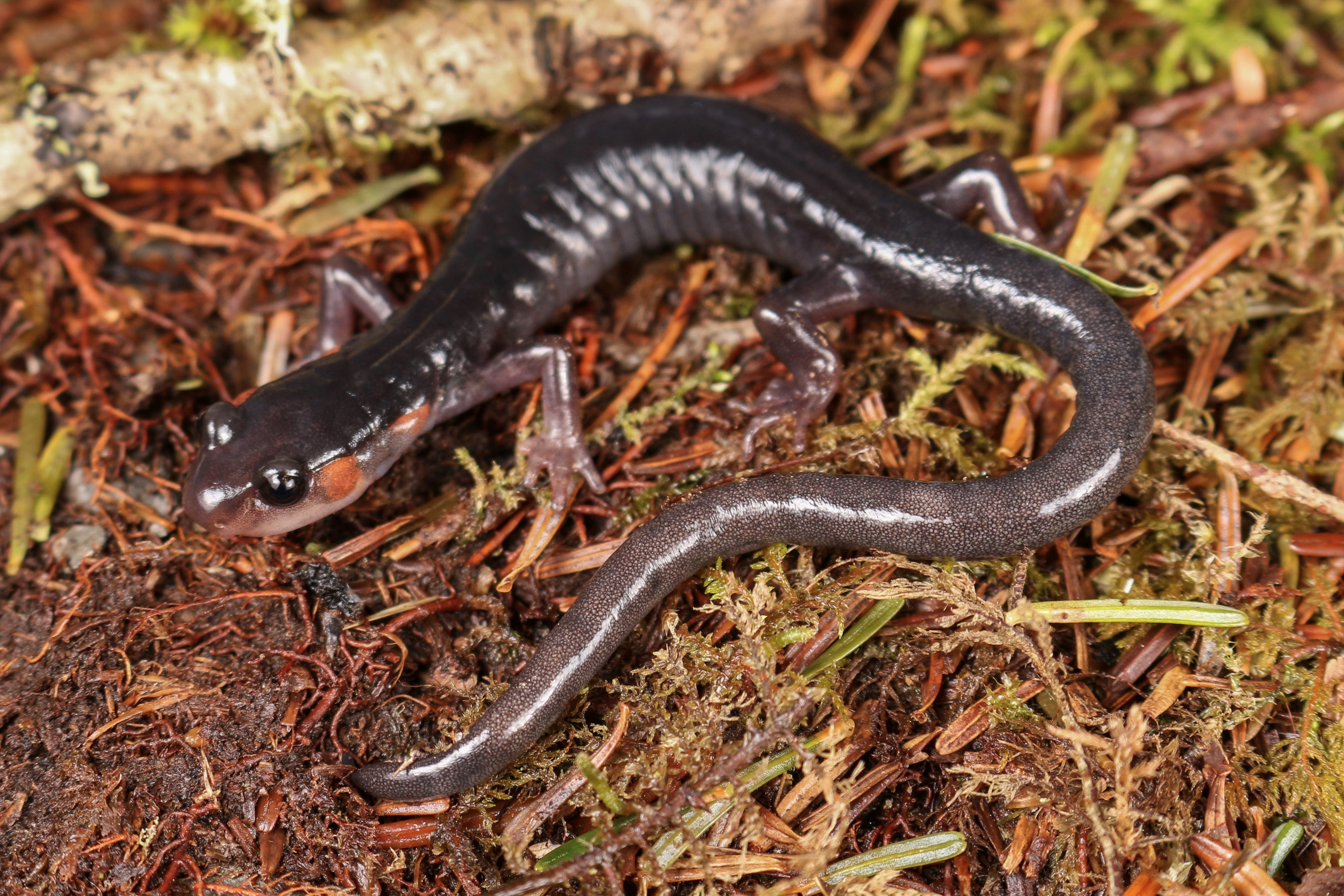
An adult red-cheeked salamander found under a rock in extreme western North Carolina

The red-cheeked salamander conceals itself during the day under rocks and in or under rotten logs. It has extensive shallow burrows through which it can move about. At night and during rain it emerges to the surface to forage. A salamander has a small home range which is about 11 square metres (120 sq ft) for a male and 2.8 square metres (30 sq ft) for a female. When displaced by a distance of 300 metres (980 ft) or more, most salamanders managed to return to their home. The red-cheeked salamander feeds on small invertebrates including worms, snails, springtails, spiders, insects and insect larvae.

Creatures that prey on the red-cheeked salamander include birds, the common garter snake (Thamnophis sirtalis), the blackbelly salamander (Desmognathus quadramaculatus) and the spring salamander (Gyrinophilus porphyriticus). When attacked, it turns its tail towards the predator and emits a sticky, noxious mucus. It may bite the head of a snake or twine its tail round its head. Another defensive strategy is the autotomisation of its tail, which may leave the predator a piece of food while the salamander flees.

Little is known of the breeding habits of the red-cheeked salamander, but they are likely to be similar to those of other members of the genus Plethodon with a clutch of eggs being brooded by the female and each egg developing directly into a juvenile without an intervening larval stage.

== Status ==
The red-cheeked salamander is listed as being "Near Threatened" in the IUCN Red List of Threatened Species. The population of the species appears to be stable, but the area of its range is less than 5,000 square kilometres (1,900 sq mi). Balancing this, it is common in many locations, tolerates forestry disturbance and lives completely within the confines of the national park. The main threats may be acid rain, climate change and the damage to forests caused by the balsam woolly adelgid (Adelges piceae).
