= Sexual selection in amphibians =

Choice of and competition for mates

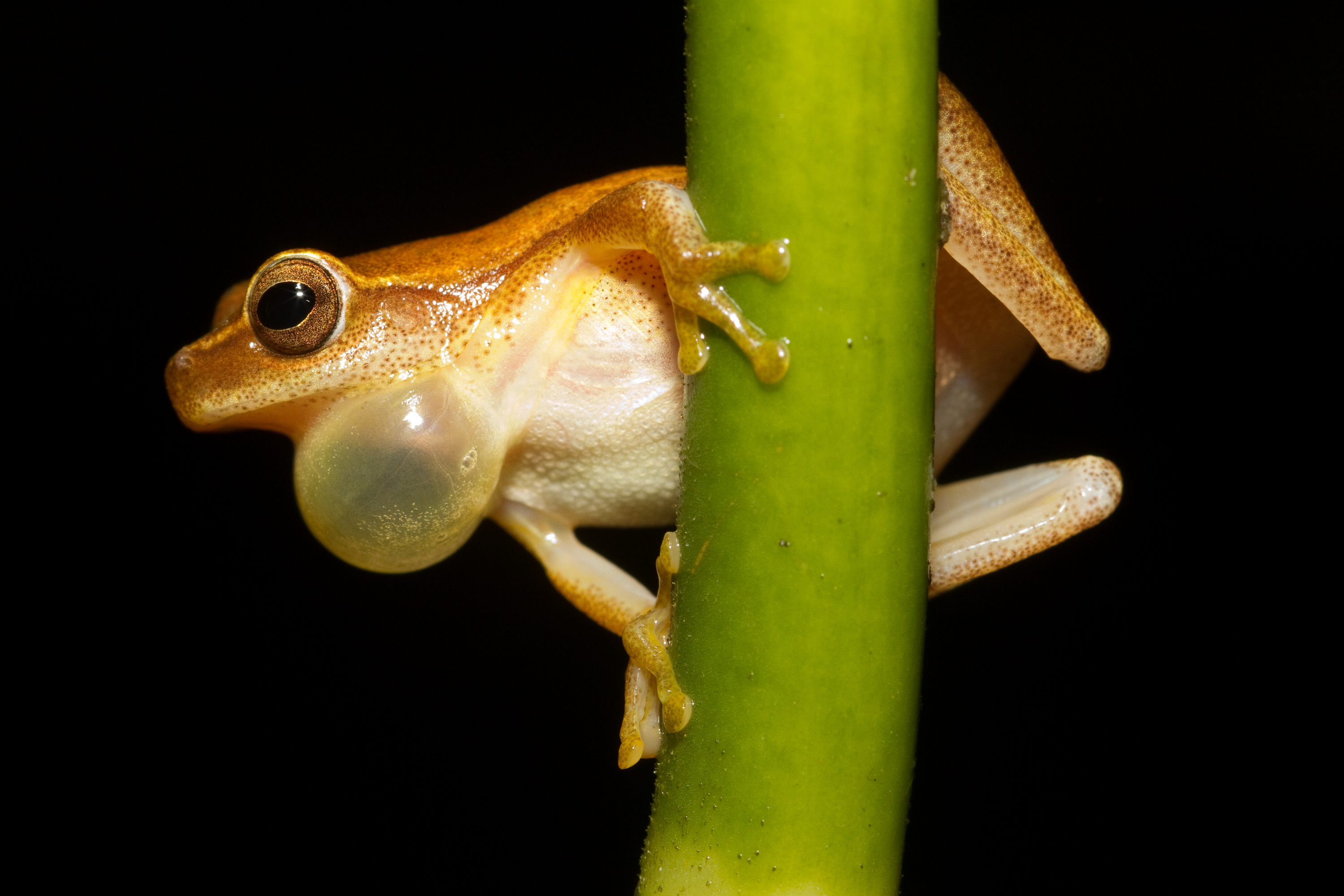
Male Dendropsophus microcephalus calling

Sexual selection in amphibians involves sexual selection processes in amphibians, including frogs, salamanders and newts. Prolonged breeders, the majority of frog species, have breeding seasons at regular intervals where male-male competition occurs with males arriving at the waters edge first in large number and producing a wide range of vocalizations, with variations in depth of calls the speed of calls and other complex behaviours to attract mates. The fittest males will have the deepest croaks and the best territories, with females making their mate choices at least partly based on the males depth of croaking. This has led to sexual dimorphism, with females being larger than males in 90% of species, males in 10% and males fighting for groups of females.

There is a direct competition between males to win the attention of the females in salamanders and newts, with elaborate courtship displays to keep the females attention long enough to get her interested in choosing him to mate with. Some species store sperm through long breeding seasons, as the extra time may allow for interactions with rival sperm.

== Selection in salamanders ==
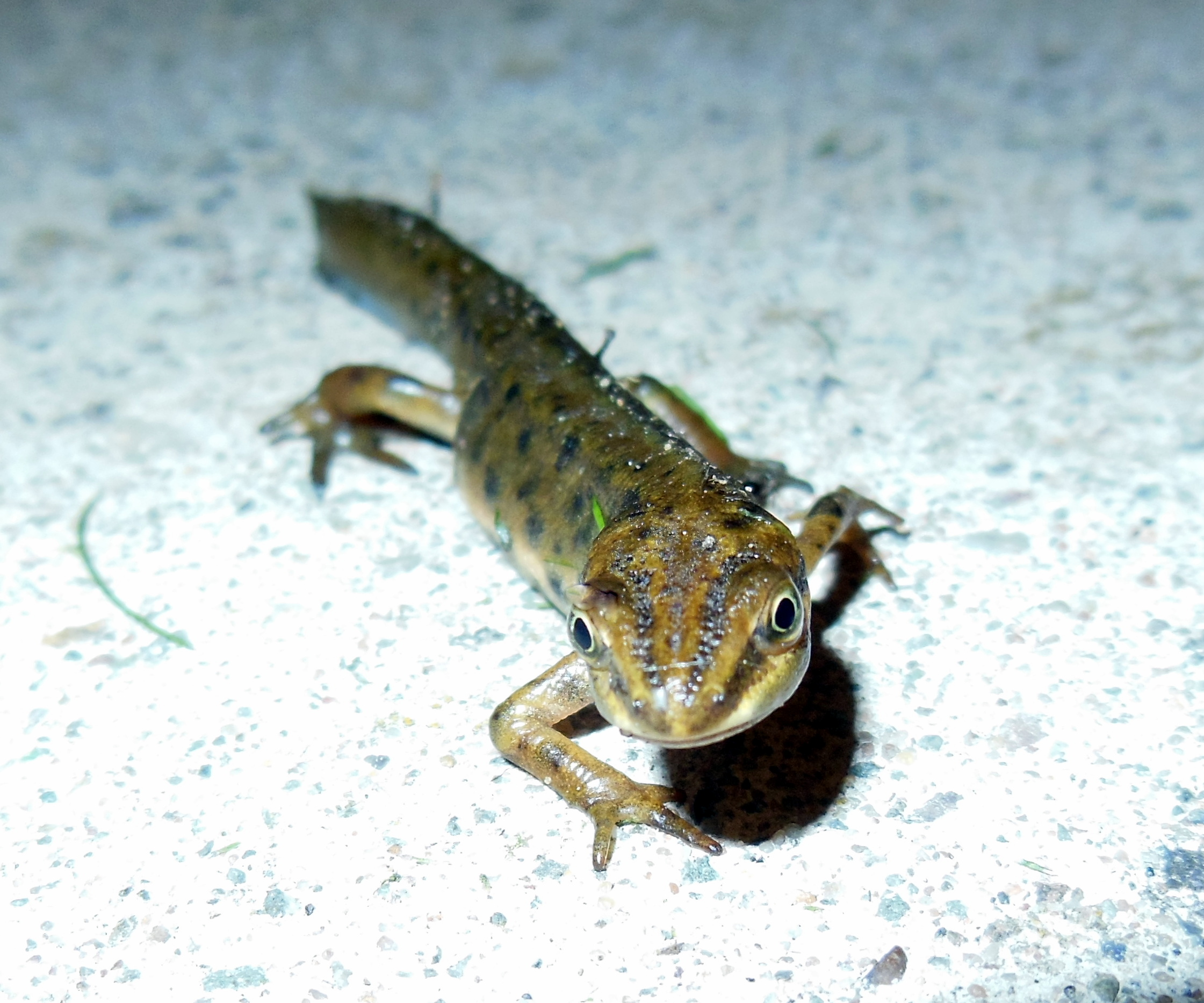
Smooth newt

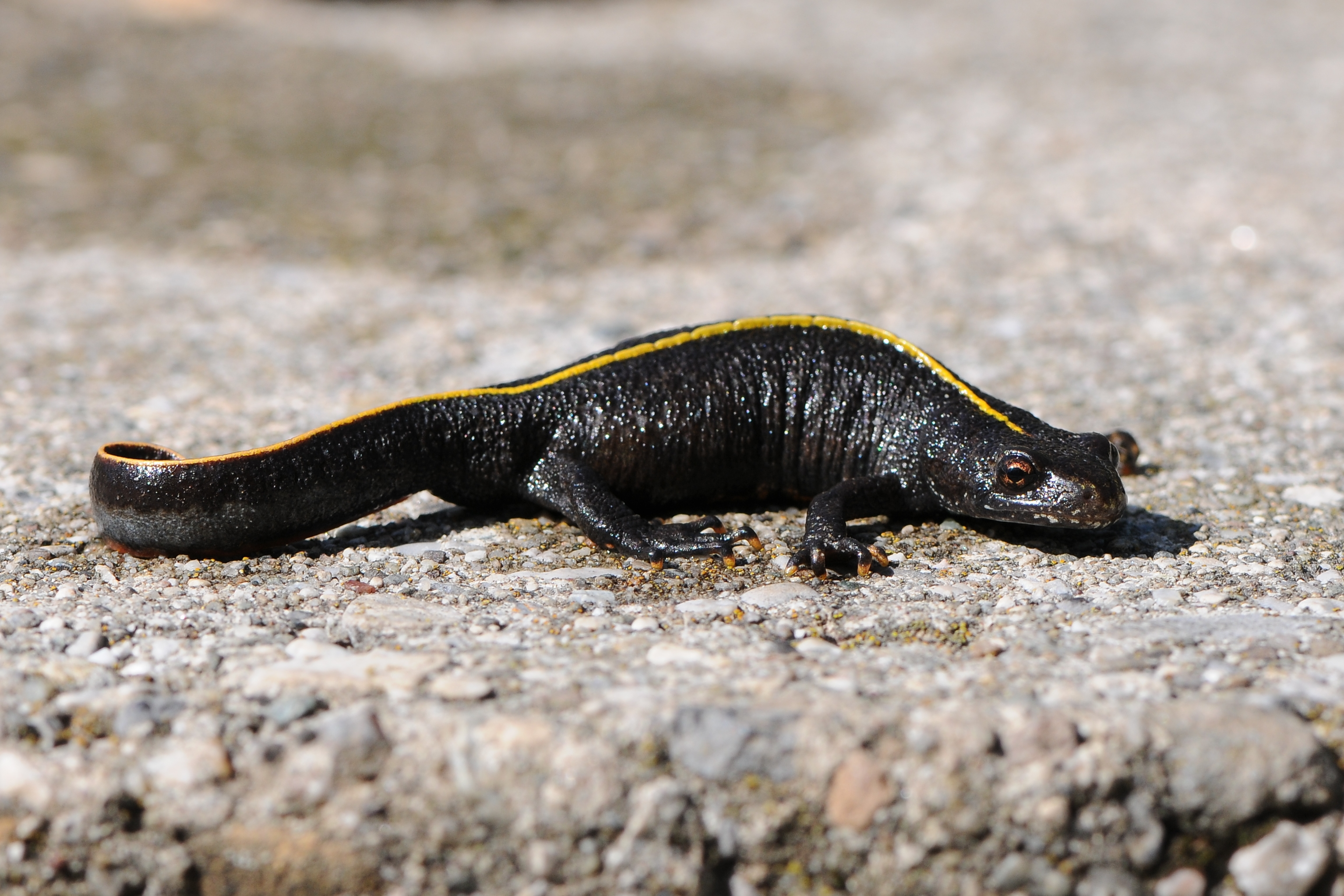
Italian crested newt

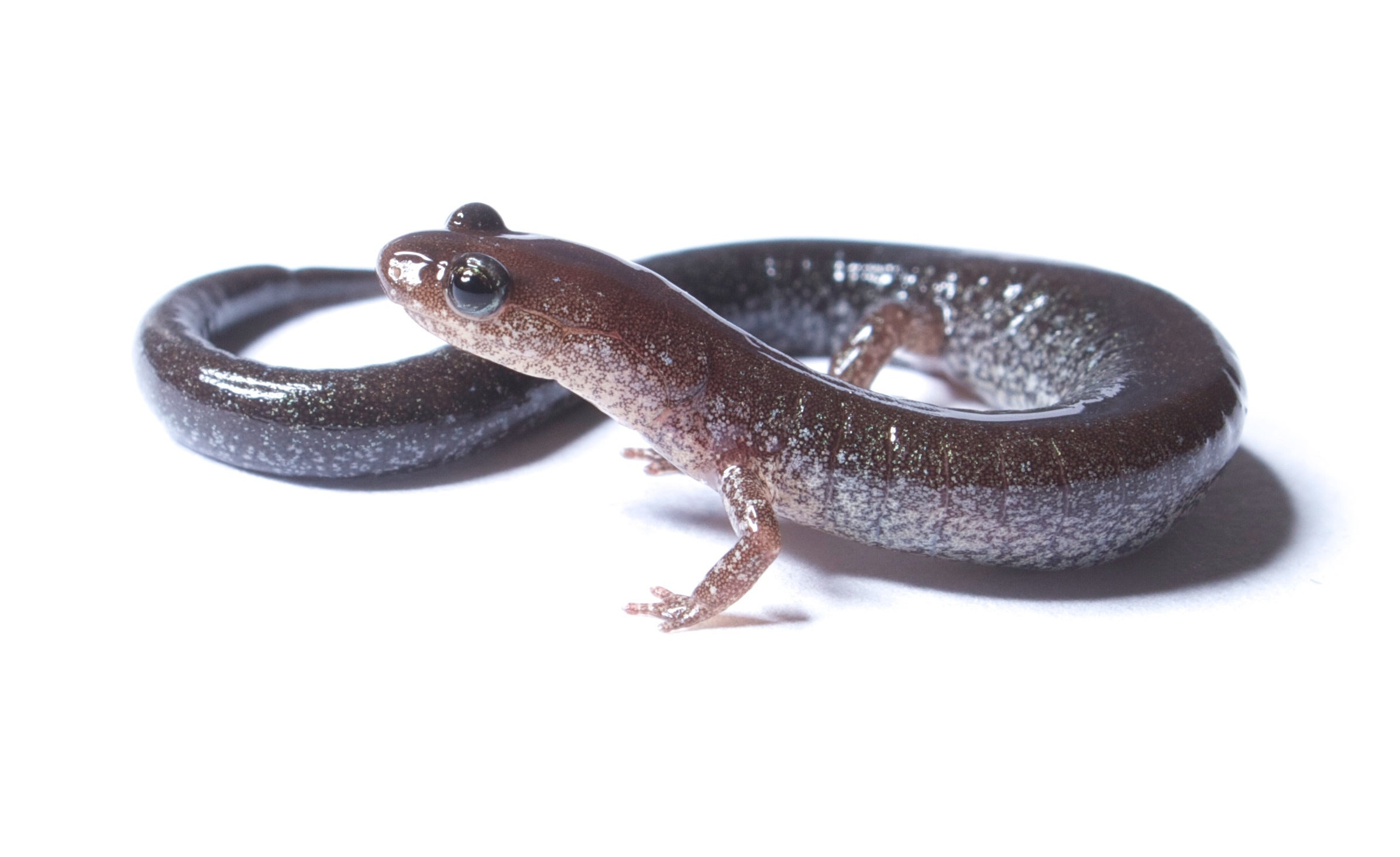
Red-backed salamander

Important aspects of courtship displays include male alert posture, approach and pursuit, the marking of the substrate trail, and tail undulations. Once a male has the attention of the female, he may release pheromones, which are used for individual recognition, mate recognition, and mate choice decisions, and generally increase female receptivity towards the male's spermatophore and improve his chances of reproductive success with her. In the red-legged salamander (Plethodon shermani), males directly apply pheromones onto the female's nares. In the aquatic smooth newt (Lissotriton vulgaris), the pheromones are delivered indirectly; the male wafts them towards the female with his tail. In some species, it has been shown that the size a larger, more elaborate male's tail has played a role in the female's decision to mate. In the newt species of the Italian crested newt (Triturus carnifex), males that possessed large mid-dorsal body crests were more favorable to the females looking to mate.

Female choice is the final step in the males attempt to reproduce; if the female does not find the male's traits desirable, reproduction will not be successful. As it is in most species, body size is an important and most common desired trait amongst females. Body size is indicative of fitness and/or genetic quality; and because it is easily observable, it can be an indicator for how a female will pick her mate. A larger body size positively correlates to higher paternity; thus larger males are more successful in siring more offspring than smaller males. Male salamanders also prefer larger females because they produce more ova than smaller females.

In sexual coercion, a form of male sexual intimidation which includes forced copulations, repeated mating attempts with the same female, and punishing resisting females. males forcibly mate with females; an example is the red-backed salamander (Plethodon cinereus). It has also been proposed as a third form of sexual selection, along with intersexual selection and intrasexual selection, even though prevailing scientific opinion is that sexual coercion is a manifestation of sexual conflict, stemming out of the natural discord between males and females. In some species of salamanders, females that are territorial and aggressive also intimidate males. Plethodon cinereus females aggressively punish males who are exhibiting social polygyny. Males have been shown to punish females that partake in mating polyandry, forcing them into mating monogamously.

Populations of salamanders tend to be heavily male-biased, which results in a higher number of males vying for access to the lesser number of females. Males will use different tactics in an effort to keep other males away from the female of interest and ensure their own paternity and reproductive success, such as sexual defense, which is used to steal other males spermatophore, which may have already deposited into the female, and sexual interference, when a male pushes the female away from another courting male, such as sperm capping, whereby a competing male lays his spermatophore directly on top of those previously deposited by another male. Females also participate in sexual interference: a rival female places herself between the courting male and the female he is courting, and attempts to engage the male in their own courtship dance, a tactic for avoiding sperm competition. The male removes the sperm from a female who had mated with a previous male: many species of salamanders will remove the spermatophore from the previous male and insert his own; thus, ensuring his paternity.

Sperm storage is a method by which females can control the sperm that fertilizes their eggs. Female salamanders and newts, most notably Triturus vulgaris, possess sperm-storage glands called spermathecae in the walls of their cloacae. Sperm storage has evolved independently to control reproduction in response to the environment. Females have the ability to store multiple spermatophores until they are needed for fertilization. Sperm storage leads to the post-copulatory sexual selection process of cryptic female choice, which occurs when a female removes the deposited sperm or favors one set of spermatophore over another, during or after copulation. Spermatophores are composed of a cap containing the spermatozoa and a gelatinous support arrangement which fastens the spermatophore to a substrate. Spermatophores are very central to reproductive success; therefore, they are handled carefully. Mating success has a direct correlation to favorable phenotypic traits such as tail loss, adult body size, and age.

== Vocal signaling in frogs ==
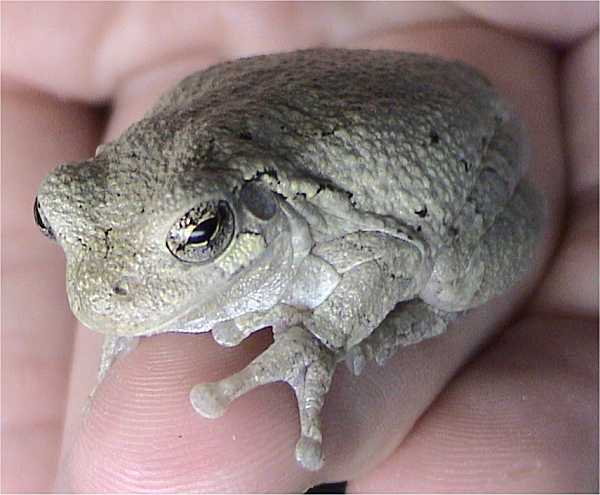
Gray tree frog

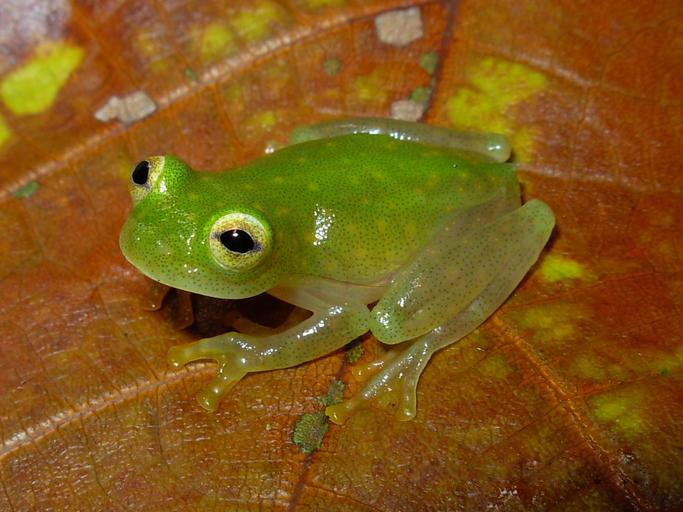
Glass frog

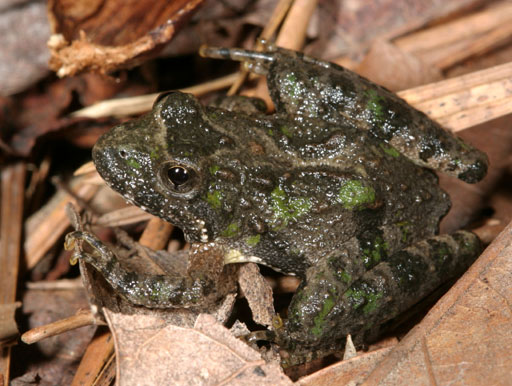
Northern cricket frog

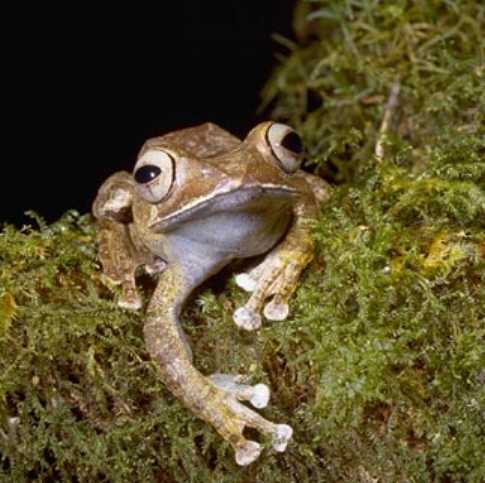
A male Boophis madagascariensis attempts to attract a female using 28 different vocalizations, among the highest known amphibian call repertoire.

The vocalizations that male frogs use to call for females are crucial for reproductive success in frogs. Initially, male frogs produce advertisement calls, considered a pre-mating isolating mechanism because females use them to isolate conspecific males, as cited in which convey information about species, sexual readiness, and size, with females moving towards the call they find most attractive. In Hyla versicolor, females favor long calls rather than short calls while in Dendropsophus microcephalus they are attracted to short and high rate calling.

isolated spring peeper call.

If a female shows interest male frogs will switch to courtship calls, some of which are simply an increase in rate, as cited by Wells and Schwartz, which can contain fifty percent more notes than advertisement calls, and can become more complex when a male is at a specific oviposition site. as cited by The glass frog (Hyalinobatrachium fleischmanni) from Panama gives long calls when a female frog is first seen and will switch to multiple staccato chirps once a female indicates interest. ^{as cited by}

Since anurans are highly sensitive to motion, females use conspicuous movements to communicate interest. Visual cues, such as the movement of a translucent vocal sac or presence of a large stripe in accessible males, may also influence mate preference by females. A female frog may also send vocal signals of her own to males, motivating copulation and competitive behaviors. Female Iberian midwife toads (Alytes cisternasii) use courtship calls to distinguish themselves from other male competitors. The African common platanna (Xenopus laevis) uses duet calling when males are not visible, allowing females to distinguish territorial males from satellite males. The Emei music frog (Babina daunchina) female calling stimulates male movement towards sound or phonotaxis.

sophisticated call of Brazilian Torrent Frog.

Calling is an energetically expensive activity, requiring high levels of aerobic respiration. Selection favors the most efficient call production, a good quality call that does not require high levels of energy. allowing a male frog to be able to call continuously for females. Dendropsophus microcephalus, a small tree frog, will produce 100 notes per minute for several hours, requiring up to 25 times more oxygen. Some frogs produce less energetic calls and remain in chorus for longer periods of time with the ability to remain active longer being better for mating success than a higher energy vocal display.

The morphological and biochemical processes of call production are influenced by sexual selection. ^{as cited by} Male frogs have developed vocal sacs that enable louder calls, with the larger tympanum increasing the radiation of the vocal signal. ^{as cited by} Males also have larger trunk muscles with highly aerobic muscle fibers, many mitochondria, and fat storage.

The sensory exploitation hypothesis states that females have natural preexisting preferences for sexual signals that have been favored by sexual selection, with males producing calls that are known to be favorable for females. A recent study of advertisement calls from 72 species of anurans has indicated that most call features in males show phylogenetic correlation, indicating that species-specific evolution of calls might be constrained by a lack of genetic variation or because female preferences for call features have diverged to only a limited extent. Male anurans will often alter the rate of calling in order to intimidate other males though females tend to favor advertisement and courtship calls over aggressive ones, indicating that aggressive vocalizations are a form of male- male competition. ^{as cited by}

Advertisement and aggressive calls are usually similar in frequency but produced at different rates. Geocrinia victoriana, an eastern Australian smooth frog, has a long aggressive note to ward off competitors and shorter notes to attract females. In Northern cricket frogs (Acris crepitans) male aggressive calls serve a dual purpose of attracting females and intimidating other male callers. The Madagascar bright eyed frog (Boophis madagascariensis) is able to produce 28 different types of aggressive calls by modifying pulse rate and notes. ^{as cited by}

Males can intercept vocal signals that were not meant for them in a tactic known as eavesdropping. The Hyla versicolor male increases calling rate and duration once a female is in vicinity. Eavesdroppers will intercept these increased signals and begin to call for the female in a more aggressive manner, which generally leads to escalated conflicts. Eavesdropping also allows male frogs to assess the body size of their competitors. The frequency of vocal signals is dependent on the mass of the laryngeal apparatus, and a large one will produce lower frequency calls, positively correlated to overall body size. Male frogs will use eavesdropping to decide whether or not to initiate aggressive conflicts. Male anurans are more likely to attack a frog with higher frequency calls. It can also inform frogs when the competition has become too intense, where it can reduce or stop calling altogether and move to a different location outside of the chorus. In order to save energy they attempt to call females where there is less competition and a better chance to court a female. Once a satellite male hears a change in vocalizations of other males he will begin courtship calling in an attempt to steal a female, with some males now invests more energy into a competitive courtship call which may sway the female's interest. Satellite males may contribute 20% of sexual reproduction in a populations. ^{as cited by}

== Polygynandry in frogs ==
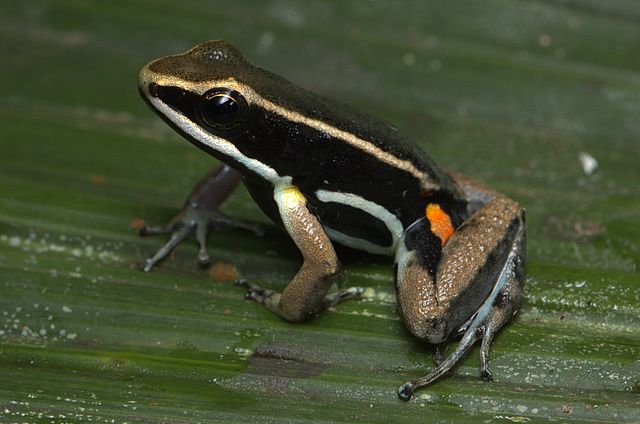
Allobates femoralis

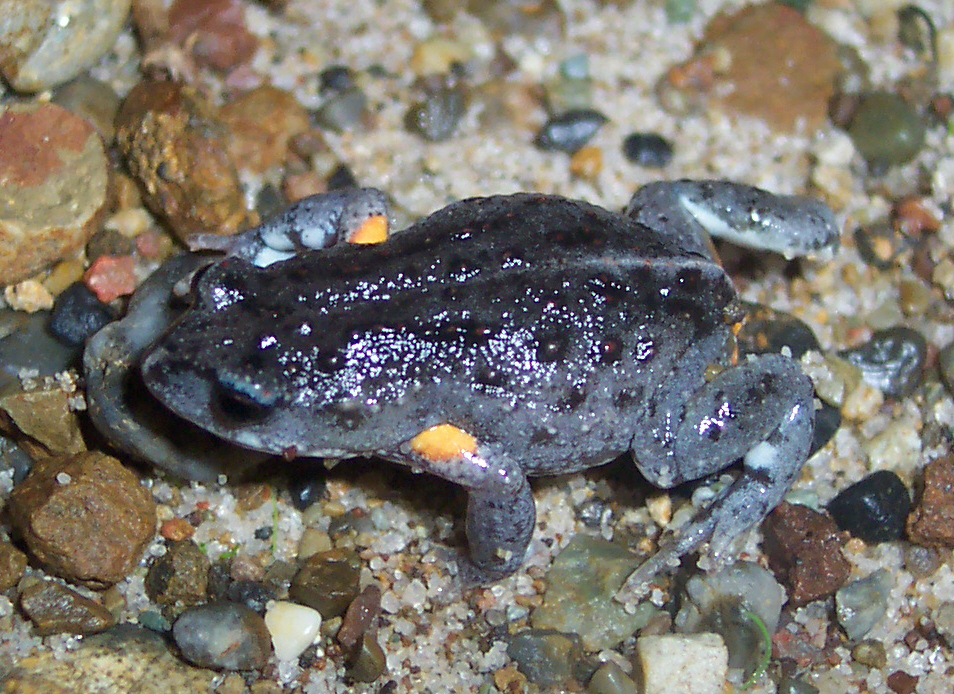
Bibron's toadlet

Anuran mating systems are promiscuous: females and males breed with multiple mates and females exhibit sequential polyandry when one female is fertilized by more than one male at different times. Anurans are external fertilizers so there is no sperm competition. Polyandry has benefits for females such as fertility insurance, paternal care insurance and dispersal of mortality risk. Female anurans have a high risk of mating with sperm depleted males due to frequent mating and tend to select the same few males displaying fitness qualities. The requirement for successful copulation is that the male and female gametes have to be released at the same time and at the right orientation. ^{as cited by}

In anurans, 70% of polyandrous species exhibit paternal care. In Allobates femoralis the female's offspring survival depends on the male's carrying abilities, as they are responsible for carrying tadpoles from terrestrial to aquatic sites. If a female only mates with one male and he is a poor parent, she may lose all of her offspring. Females reduce the risk of losing all of their offspring because it is likely that some of the males they mated with make good parents. Sequential polyandry will allow females to have a multiple clutches in different nest sites, reducing the risk of abiotic factors, such as temperature, or biotic factors like predators affecting development of the offspring. ^{as cited by}

Some male behaviors that may have led to polyandry are displacement, where a male is gripped onto and mating with a female, another male may make an effort to mate as well and displace the male that was originally copulating; forced copulation, where there is a high density of aggressive males, and female abandonment, where a female but spots a better one to mate with and abandons the less favorable one. This can lead to sequential polyandry if the male leaves before the entire clutch is released and an additional male fertilizes these eggs as well. In Bibron's toadlet (Pseudophryne bibronii), females spread out their eggs across the nests of two to eight males, with those who exhibited higher levels of polyandrous behavior having higher mean offspring survivorship, showing that insurance against nest failure and dispersal of mortality risk is related to the evolution of polyandry.

== Dimorphism and morphology ==
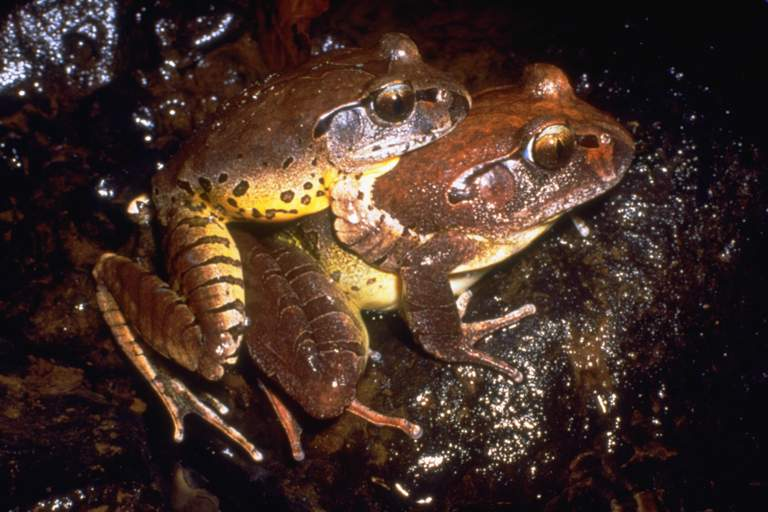
Small male and large female Fleay's barred frog (Mixophyes fleayi) in amplexus

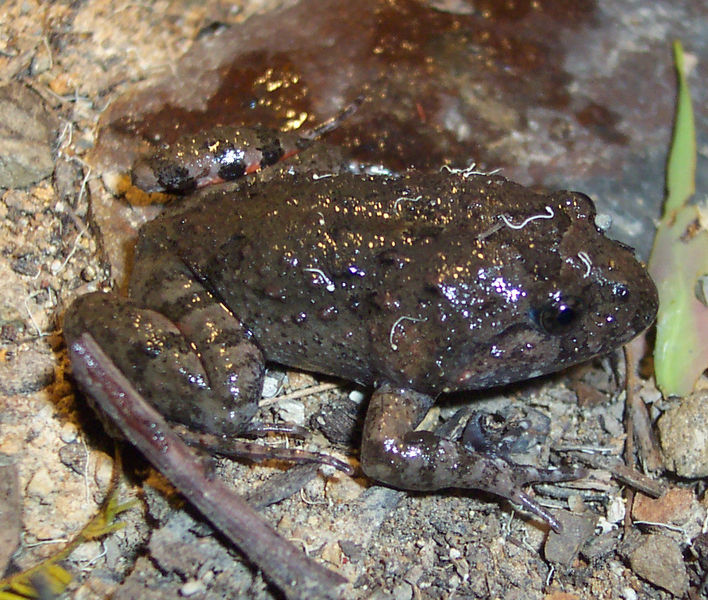
Male tusked frog

Sexual dimorphism is seen as size difference between sexes in salamanders and in 90% of anuran species. Larger females is a result of selection for fecundity, including egg size or clutch size as they can store more energy and produce more offspring. ^{as cited by} Females are never more than twice the size of males.

Size is important in male-male competition, with larger males having an advantage, due to the "male combat hypothesis" which suggests that male combative behavior is positively related to male body size. Males in the tusked frog (Adelotus brevis) and the fanged frog (Limnonectes kuhlii) use fangs and tusks as weapons to defend their calling sites. Larger body size and larger weaponry leads to higher reproductive rates. ^{as cited by} However, data suggest that this male mechanism only operates in superfamily Dentrobatoidea, possibly due to alternative mating techniques that reduce selection pressure on body size. Large African bullfrog (Pyxicephalus adspersus) males defend territories while small intimidated males move away and become satellite males. These smaller males use eavesdropping techniques and mate with females who are in range of their satellite location.

== Sexual role reversal in Dendrobates auratus ==
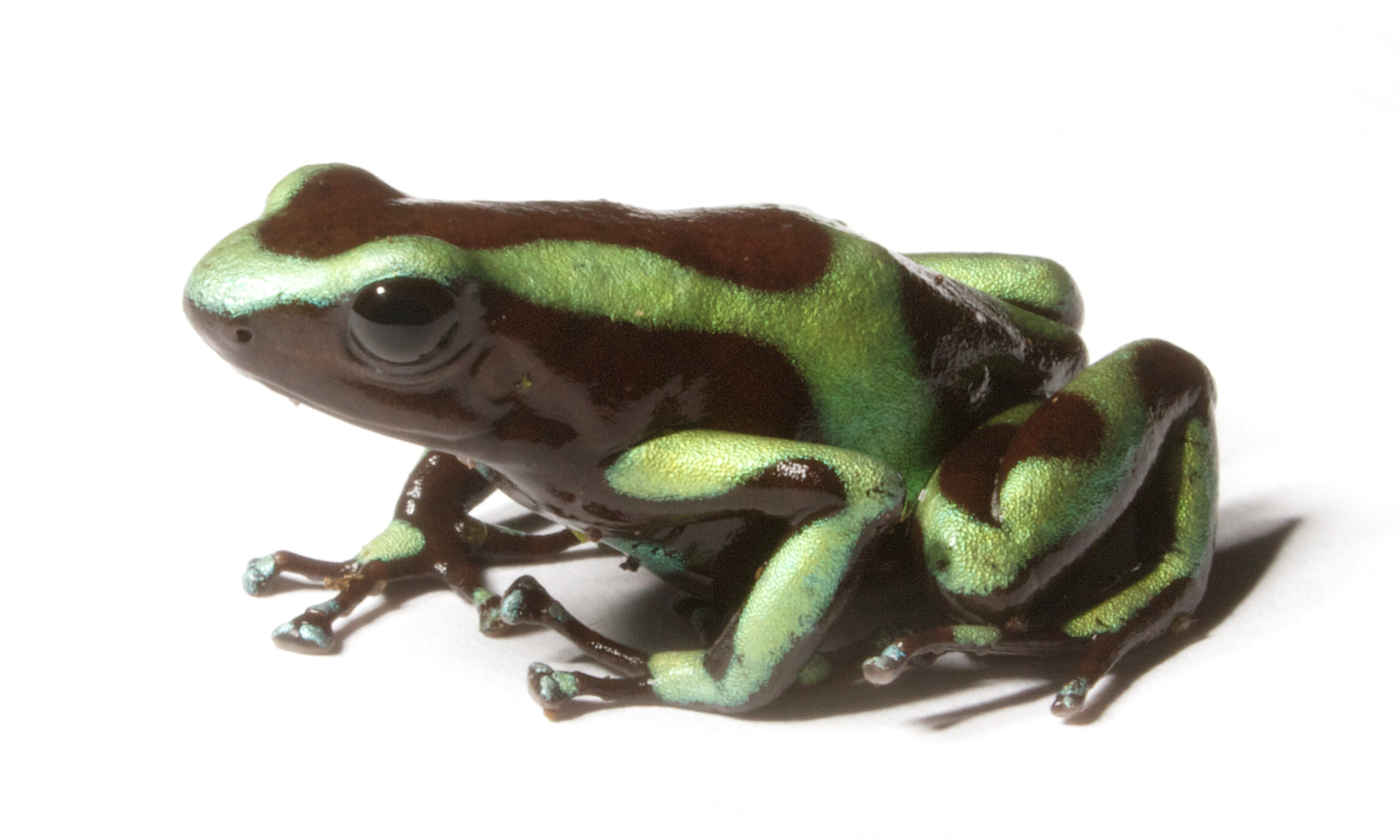
Poison dart frog Dendrobates auratus

Initial observation of mating in the green poison-dart frog Dendrobates auratus shows convincing evidence of sex-role reversal. Small female clutch size, female-female competition, and large parental care investment by males are characteristic of sexual role reversal. ^{as cited by} To test whether this sexual role reversal was true, two hypotheses were tested; the sexual role reversal hypothesis and the parental quality hypothesis.

For the sexual role reversal hypothesis to be true, females would compete for as many males as possible, and this was not supported because male-male competition for mates was as common as female-female competition. In sexual role reversal males usually become more selective; however, in Dendrobates auratus females were more selective when choosing males, supporting the parental quality hypothesis, which predicted that females would compete for the parental care of particular males. Females were defensive of their mating partners and used courtship techniques to prevent males from mating with other females and destroyed rivals' eggs. These observations support the parental quality hypothesis. Summers weakens the sexual role reversal hypothesis and strengthens the case parental quality selection.
