= Mantophryne menziesi =

Conservation status
- Least Concern (IUCN 3.1)

Scientific classification
- Kingdom: Animalia
- Phylum: Chordata
- Class: Amphibia
- Order: Anura
- Family: Microhylidae
- Genus: Mantophryne
- Species: M. menziesi

Binomial name
- Mantophryne menziesi (Zweifel, 1972)

Synonyms
- Pherohapsis menziesi Zweifel, 1972

Species of frog

Mantophryne menziesi, commonly known as the Iarowari School frog, is a species of frog in the family Microhylidae. It is endemic to New Guinea and is only known from near Port Moresby, Papua New Guinea. The actual limits of its distribution are poorly known.

Mantophryne menziesi is a poorly known species, but it is not uncommon and has been recorded from mowed lawns, plantations, and closed-canopy rainforest at elevations below 460 m (1,510 ft). Males call from concealed positions, possibly holes. Development is direct (i.e., there is no free-living larval stage). It is a very adaptable species that appears not to be facing any serious threats. It might occur in the Varirata National Park.
