= Mantophryne louisiadensis =

Conservation status
- Least Concern (IUCN 3.1)

Scientific classification
- Kingdom: Animalia
- Phylum: Chordata
- Class: Amphibia
- Order: Anura
- Family: Microhylidae
- Genus: Mantophryne
- Species: M. louisiadensis

Binomial name
- Mantophryne louisiadensis (Parker, 1934)
- Mantophryne louisiadensis is only known from Rossel Island, Papua New Guinea

Synonyms
- Asterophrys louisiadensis Parker, 1934; Phrynomantis louisiadensis (Parker, 1934)

Species of frog

Mantophryne louisiadensis is a species of frog in the family Microhylidae. It is endemic to Rossel Island, a part of the Louisiade Archipelago in the Milne Bay Province of Papua New Guinea. Common name Louisiade archipelago frog (Note: The proposed common name for the genus Mantophryne is "archipelago frog", hence "archipelago" needs not to be capitalized.) has been proposed for this species. Mantophryne axanthogaster from the neighboring Sudest Island was formerly included in it.

== Description ==
Adult males measure 40–55 mm (1.6–2.2 in) and adult females 73–84 mm (2.9–3.3 in) in snout–vent length. The head is relatively wide. The dorsum is uniform brown or gray. The ventral side is bright yellow or orange-yellow.

== Habitat and conservation ==
Mantophryne louisiadensis occurs in lowland rainforest and cloud forest at elevations below 700 m (2,300 ft). There are no recent observations of this species, but it does not appear to be facing major threats. Suitable habitat appears to be plentiful as Rossel Island is very largely covered by primary or slightly disturbed rainforest and this species ranges across the entire altitudinal range of the island. It is not known to occur in any protected area.
