= Mantophryne lateralis =

Conservation status
- Least Concern (IUCN 3.1)

Scientific classification
- Kingdom: Animalia
- Phylum: Chordata
- Class: Amphibia
- Order: Anura
- Family: Microhylidae
- Genus: Mantophryne
- Species: M. lateralis

Binomial name
- Mantophryne lateralis Boulenger, 1897

Synonyms
- Phrynomantis lateralis (Boulenger, 1897)

Species of frog

Mantophryne lateralis is a species of frog in the family Microhylidae. It is endemic to New Guinea and is found on the north coast of Papua in Indonesia and both north and south of the Central Range in Papua New Guinea. It is also known from the Normanby Island (Papua New Guinea). Common name Victoria archipelago frog has been proposed for it.

Mantophryne lateralis is an abundant and widespread species that occurs in tropical rainforests at elevations below 1,450 m (4,760 ft). It is adaptable and has also been recorded from rural gardens. It is active at night on the forest floor. It has direct development (i.e., there is no free-living larval stage). There are no known threats to this species whose range overlaps with a number of protected areas.
