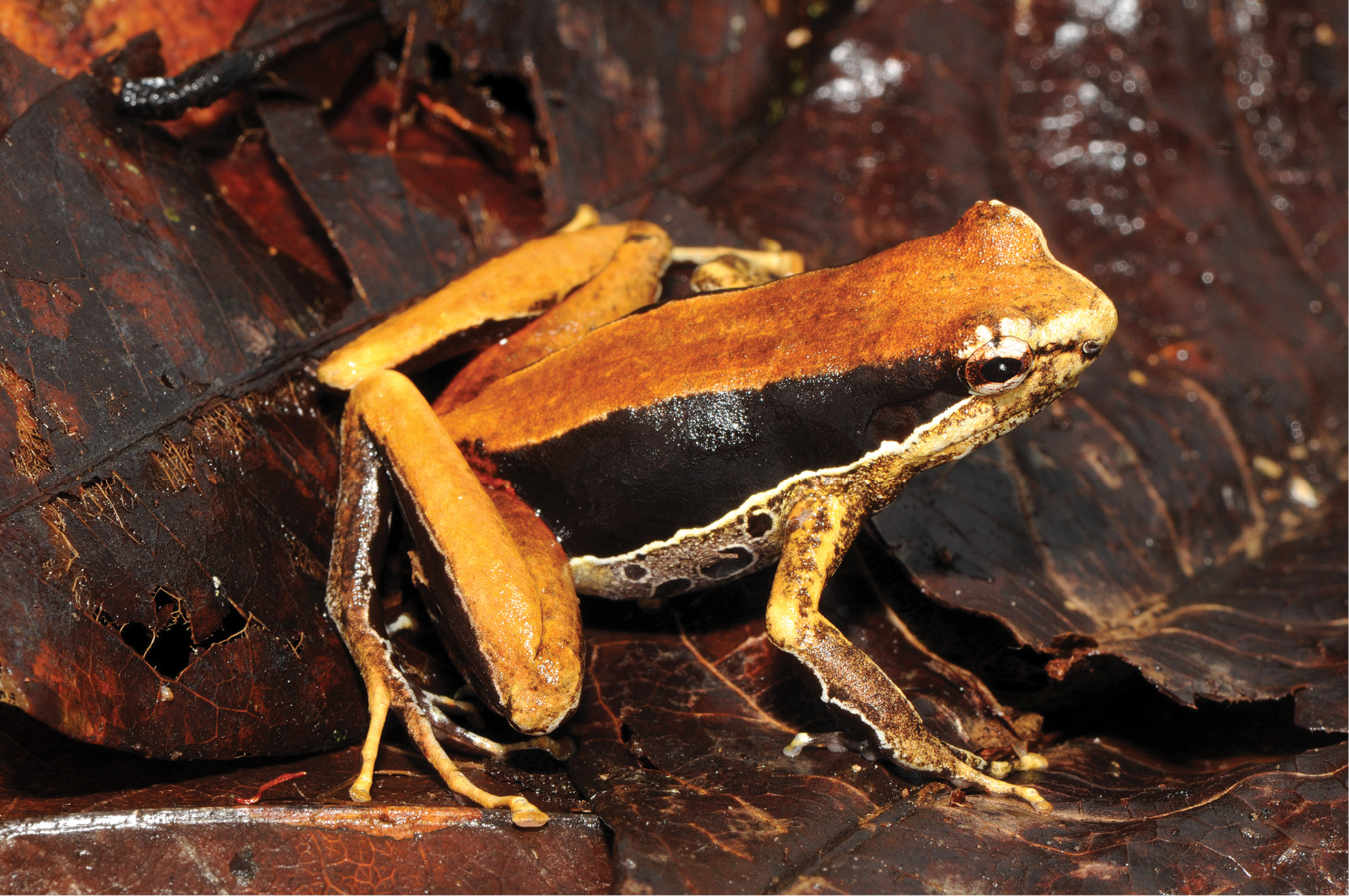
- Male Mantophryne insignis

Scientific classification
- Domain: Eukaryota
- Kingdom: Animalia
- Phylum: Chordata
- Class: Amphibia
- Order: Anura
- Family: Microhylidae
- Subfamily: Asterophryinae
- Genus: Mantophryne; Boulenger, 1897

Species
- 5 species (see text)

Synonyms
- Pherohapsis Zweifel, 1972

= Mantophryne =

Genus of amphibians

Mantophryne is a genus of microhylid frogs. The genus is found in New Guinea, Louisiade Archipelago, and Woodlark Island.

== Species ==
There are five recognized species:

Binomial name and author	Common name
Mantophryne axanthogaster Kraus and Allison, 2009
Mantophryne insignis Günther and Richards, 2016
Mantophryne lateralis Boulenger, 1897	Victoria archipelago frog
Mantophryne louisiadensis (Parker, 1934)	Louisiade archipelago frog
Mantophryne menziesi (Zweifel, 1972)	Iarowari School frog
