= Mantophryne axanthogaster =

Scientific classification
- Kingdom: Animalia
- Phylum: Chordata
- Class: Amphibia
- Order: Anura
- Family: Microhylidae
- Genus: Mantophryne
- Species: M. axanthogaster

Binomial name
- Mantophryne axanthogaster Kraus and Allison, 2009
- Mantophryne axanthogaster is only known from Sudest Island, Papua New Guinea

Species of frog

Mantophryne axanthogaster is a species of frog in the family Microhylidae. It is endemic to Sudest Island, a part of Louisiade Archipelago in the Milne Bay Province of Papua New Guinea.

== Etymology ==
The specific name axanthogaster is derived from Greek words meaning "without yellow belly", which distinguishes it from its close relative M. louisiadensis with which it was formerly included.

== Description ==
Adult males measure 40–46 mm (1.6–1.8 in) and adult females 44–51 mm (1.7–2.0 in) in snout–vent length. The head is wider than it is long. The snout is rounded. The tympanum is distinct only anteriorly. The finger tips bear discs; the fingers are unwebbed. The toe discs are larger than the finger ones; the toes have rudimentary webbing. Dorsal skin has faint, scattered dermal pustules; the flanks as well as the belly are smooth. The dorsum (back) is brown, spotted with dark brown and venter (belly) is light gray, mottled with dark gray.

The male advertisement call is a series of loud, barking notes.

== Habitat and conservation ==
Mantophryne axanthogaster occurs at elevations of 100–800 m (330–2,620 ft) above sea level, ranging from primary lowland rainforest cloud forest. It seems to be more common near streams. Males call from exposed sites on the ground, often near small piles of leaf litter. Calling takes usually place at night, but may occasionally occur on rainy days too.

Mantophryne axanthogaster was found to be abundant. As of late 2020, it has not been assessed for the IUCN Red List of Threatened Species.
