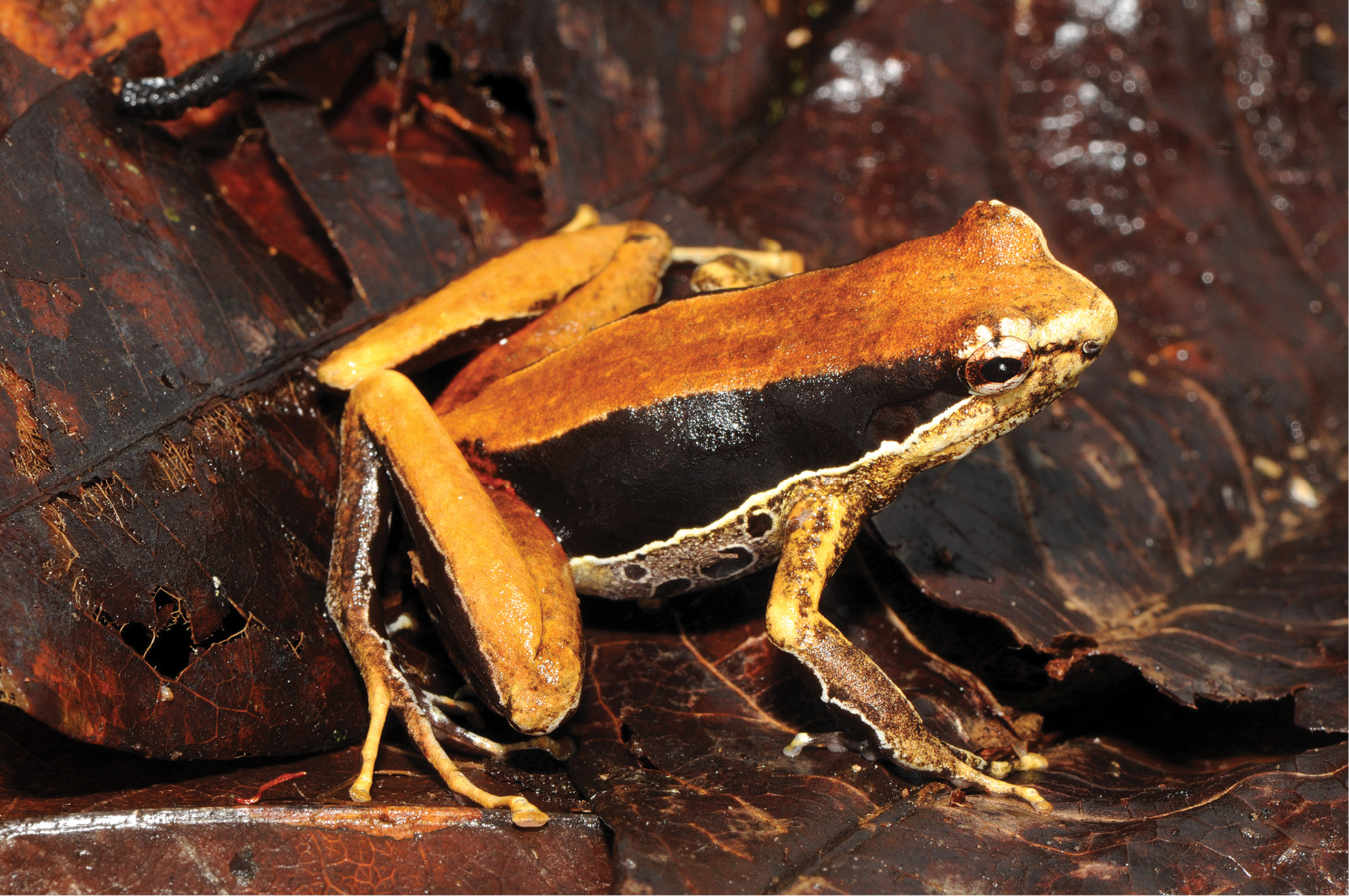
- Holotype of Mantophryne insignis, an adult male

Scientific classification
- Kingdom: Animalia
- Phylum: Chordata
- Class: Amphibia
- Order: Anura
- Family: Microhylidae
- Genus: Mantophryne
- Species: M. insignis

Binomial name
- Mantophryne insignis Günther and Richards, 2016
- Mantophryne insignis is only known from Woodlark Island, Papua New Guinea

= Mantophryne insignis =

Species of frog

Mantophryne insignis is a species of frog in the family Microhylidae. It is endemic to Woodlark Island in the Milne Bay Province of Papua New Guinea. The specific name insignis is Latin meaning "remarkable" or "conspicuous". It refers to the distinctive colour pattern of this frog, as well as to its unusual arboreal lifestyle within predominantly terrestrial genus.

== Description ==
Adult males measure 34–36 mm (1.3–1.4 in) in snout–urostyle length. The body is slender and the legs are long. The snout is truncate. The tympanum is distinct. The fingers and the toes are unwebbed and bear small but distinct discs; toe discs are larger than the fingers ones. The dorsum is smooth and uniformly golden tan in colour (rarely creamy tan), surrounded by broad, blackish dorsolateral bands that are edged below with narrow, slightly undulating white stripes. All ventral surfaces have whitish ground colour. The throat and the chest are covered by variably intense brown pigmentation and scattered large dark-brown spots. The abdomen and lower parts of the flanks are covered by a pattern of very conspicuous dark-brown blotches, each encircled by a narrow white line. The iris is silvery with a few irregular, dark lines.

The male advertisement call is a rattle lasting several seconds. The dominant frequency is at 2.0 kHz.

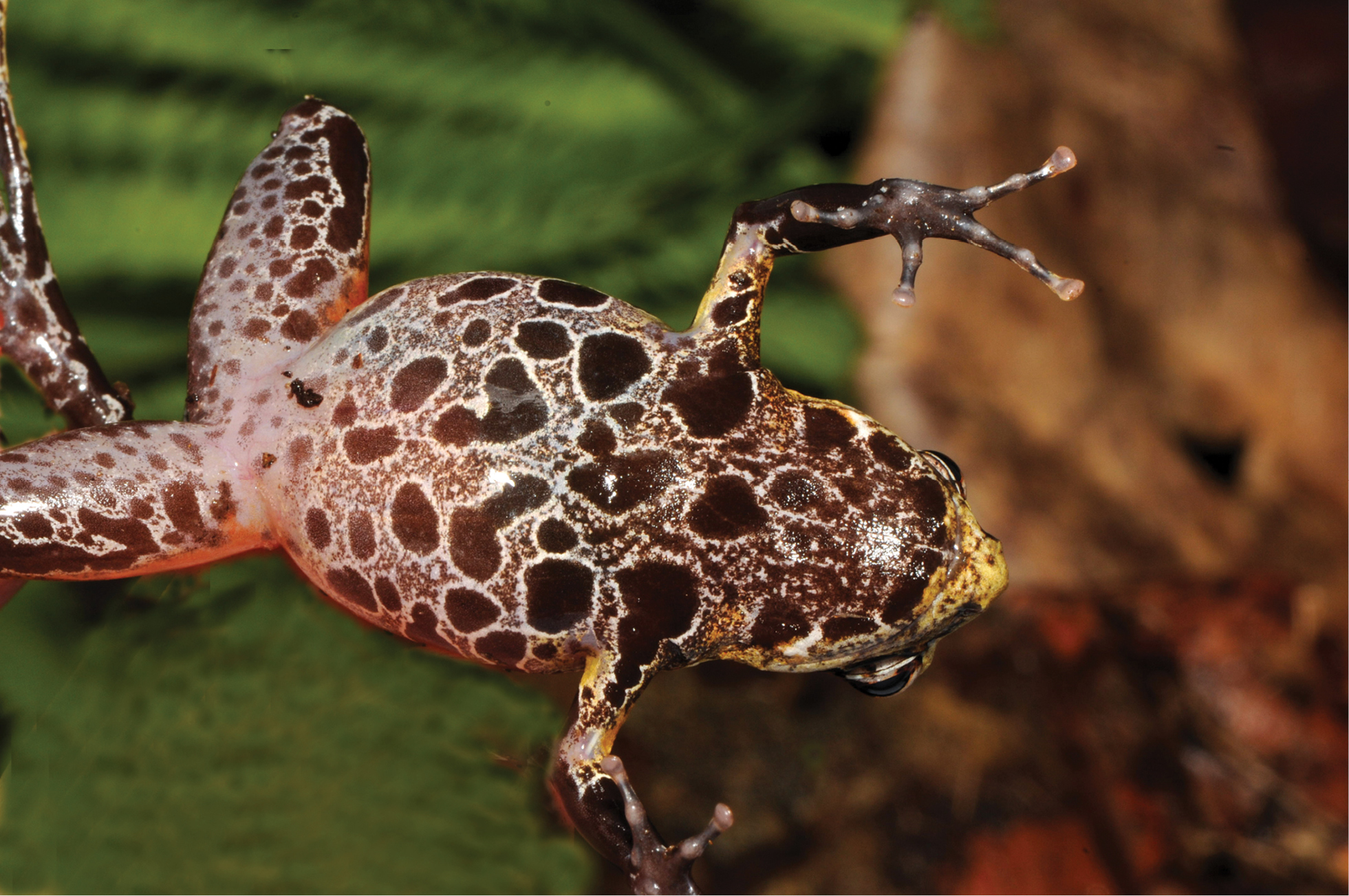
Holotype in ventral view.

== Habitat and conservation ==
Mantophryne insignis is known lowland rainforest at elevations of 30–180 m (98–591 ft) above sea level. Males call at night. All known specimens have been found calling from various hidden perches, ranging from under a leaf on the forest floor to rocks, logs and tree buttresses at moderate heights to about 4 m (13 ft) above the ground in climbing pandanus (Freycinetia sp.) plants. The body form, long legs, and expanded toe discs of this species reflects its arboreal habits, which is unusual within the genus Mantophryne.

Mantophryne insignis is likely to be widespread in lowland rainforest on Woodlark Island, but is not known from any other island. As of late 2019, it has not been assessed for the IUCN Red List of Threatened Species.
