= B. maculata =

B. maculata may refer to:

- Badumna maculata, an intertidal spider
- Balionycteris maculata, a Southeast Asian megabat
- Bambusa maculata, an evergreen plant
- Barygenys maculata, a frog endemic to Papua New Guinea
- Bathyraja maculata, a Pacific skate
- Begonia maculata, a plant native to Brazil
- Belone maculata, a marine fish
- Belonogaster maculata, a quasisocial wasp
- Bertolonia maculata, a plant native to South America
- Bicalcasura maculata, a Dominican weevil
- Biceropsis maculata, a daddy longlegs
- Blackburnia maculata, a ground beetle
- Bohpa maculata, a chalcid wasp
- Boiruna maculata, a colubrid snake
- Boulengerella maculata, a South American pike-characin
- Brachichila maculata, a ground beetle
- Brahmaea maculata, an African moth
- Brassia maculata, a North American orchid
- Brownleea maculata, a plant native to Africa
- Burlingtonia maculata, an orchid endemic to Brazil
