= Pulicaris =

Pulicaris may refer to:

- Carex pulicaris, species of sedge
- Cea pulicaris, species of wasps
- Cyperus pulicaris, species of sedge
- Enes pulicaris, species of beetle
- Gibberella pulicaris, fungal plant pathogen
