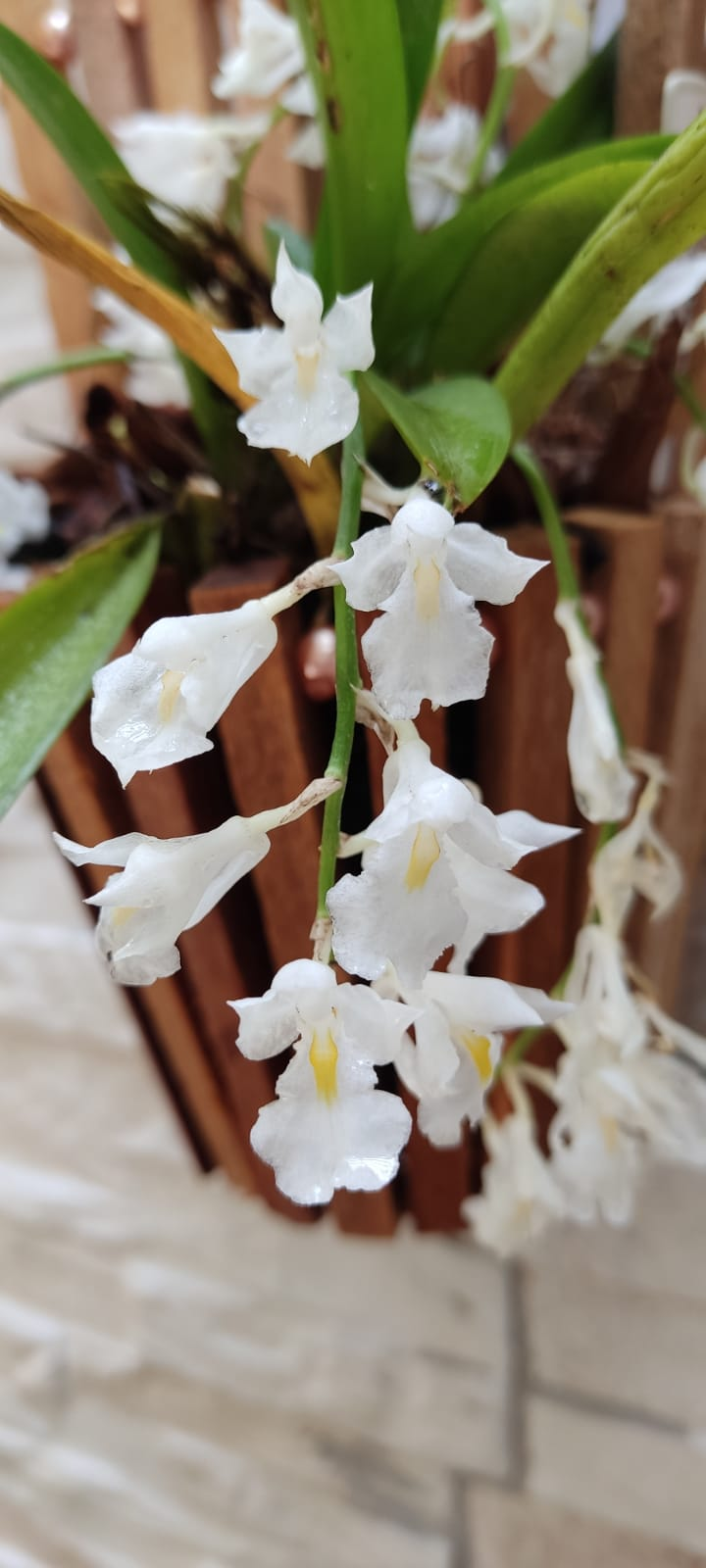
- Image of Rodriguezia venusta

Scientific classification
- Kingdom: Plantae
- Clade: Tracheophytes
- Clade: Angiosperms
- Clade: Monocots
- Order: Asparagales
- Family: Orchidaceae
- Subfamily: Epidendroideae
- Genus: Rodriguezia
- Species: R. venusta

Binomial name
- Rodriguezia venusta (Rchb.f.) Lindl.

Synonyms
- Burlingtonia fragrans Lindl.; Burlingtonia venusta (Rchb.f.) Lindl.; Rodriguezia fragrans (Lindl.) Rchb.f.; Burlingtonia knowlesii B.S.Williams; Rodriguezia flavida Garay & Dunst.

= Rodriguezia venusta =

Species of orchid

Rodriguezia venusta is a species of orchid native to Guyana, Suriname, Venezuela, Ecuador, and Brazil.

== Description ==
Rodriguezia venusta is an epiphytic orchid species, with sympodial growth and exuberant flowering. Its flowers bloom in the form of hanging stems full of small white flowers with a center varying between beige or yellowish tones. Its size is small, not reaching more than 20 centimeters in height, however, it is grouped in dense clumps, growing horizontally.

Its roots are aerial, so this orchid prefers stony substrates, and planting in confined pots should be avoided.
