= B. rosea =

B. rosea may refer to:

- Bersama rosea, a synonym for Bersama abyssinica
- Burlingtonia rosea, a synonym for Rodriguezia lanceolata

== See also ==
- Rosea (disambiguation)
