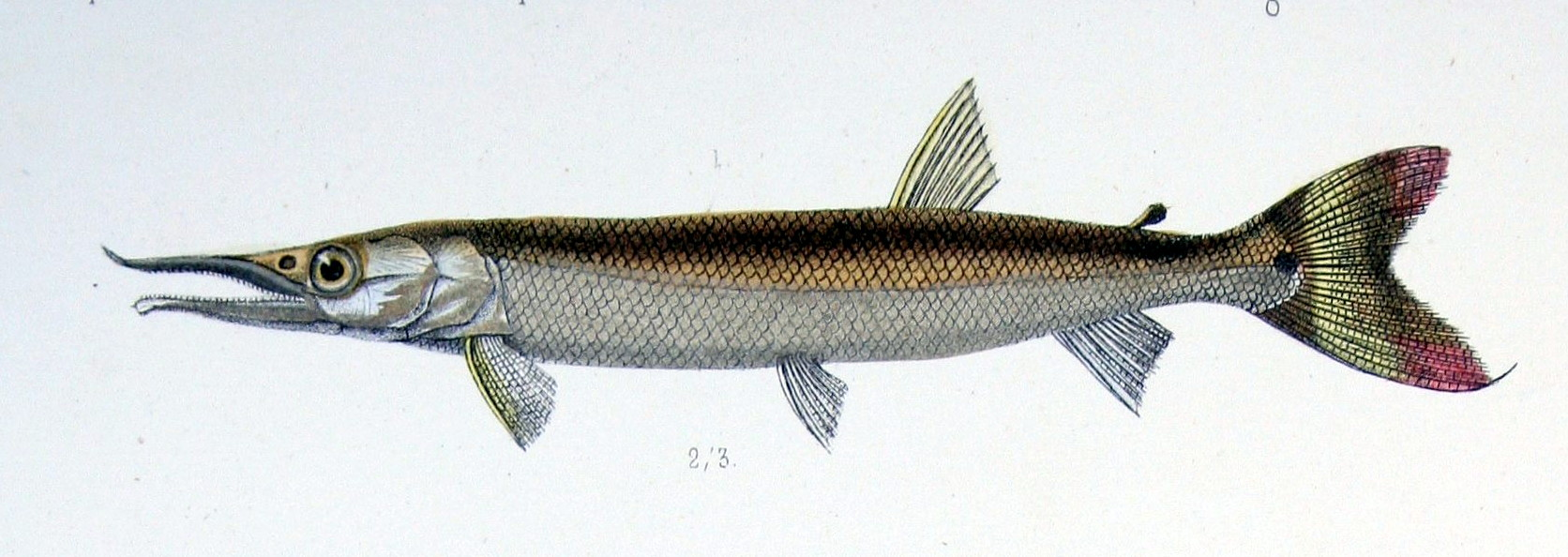

Conservation status
- Least Concern (IUCN 3.1)

Scientific classification
- Kingdom: Animalia
- Phylum: Chordata
- Class: Actinopterygii
- Order: Characiformes
- Family: Ctenoluciidae
- Genus: Boulengerella
- Species: B. cuiveri

Binomial name
- Boulengerella cuiveri Spix & Agassiz, 1829

Synonyms
- Xiphostoma cuvieri Spix & Agassiz, 1829; Xiphostoma ocellatum Jardine, 1841; Xiphostoma oseryi Castelnau, 1855; Xiphostoma longipinne Steindachner, 1876

= Boulengerella cuvieri =

Species of fish

Boulengerella cuiveri, commonly known as the bicuda, is a species of pike-characin in the family Ctenoluciidae.

The fish is named in honor of French naturalist and zoologist Georges Cuvier (1769–1832), because he was first to accurately diagnose the family Salmones, which at that time included all characiform fishes.

== Description ==
Boulengerella cuiveri grows to a maximum length of 88 cm (35 in), and has a maximum published weight of 6 kg (13 lb). It has ten to eleven dorsal soft rays, nine to eleven anal soft rays, and 48 to 49 vertebrae. It lacks dorsal and anal spines. It is a carnivore, and typically preys upon smaller fish.

== Distribution and habitat ==
Boulengerella cuiveri is a freshwater fish native to the Amazon region. It can be found in Peru and Brazil, the Orinoco River in Colombia and Venezuela, and the tributaries of the Amazon, such as the Tocantins River, Araguaia River, Negro River, Madeira River, and others as far as Bolivia. Furthermore, it is can also be found in the Essequibo River in Guyana and French Guiana. It can be found on the surface of areas with rapidly flowing water, usually behind obstacles such as fallen logs or rocks.

== Conservation status ==
In 2020, this species was assessed by the IUCN Red List and determined to be a least-concern species.
