= Ctenolucius beani =

Conservation status
- Least Concern (IUCN 3.1)

Scientific classification
- Kingdom: Animalia
- Phylum: Chordata
- Class: Actinopterygii
- Order: Characiformes
- Family: Ctenoluciidae
- Genus: Ctenolucius
- Species: C. beani

Binomial name
- Ctenolucius beani (Fowler, 1907)

Synonyms
- Belonocharax beani Fowler, 1907; Luciocharax striatus Boulenger, 1911

Species of fish

Ctenolucius beani is a species of freshwater ray-finned fish belonging to the family Ctenoluciidae, the pike-characins. This fish is found in northern South America and southern Panama.

== Taxonomy ==
Ctenolucius beani was first formally described as Belonocharax beani in 1907 by the American zoologist Henry Weed Fowler, with its type locality given as Truando in the Río Atrato basin in the Isthmus of Darien in Colombia. When Fowler described this species, he proposed the new monospecific genus Belonocharax, but this is now considered to be a synonym of Ctenolucius, a genus proposed in 1861 by Theodore Gill. Ctenolucius is one of two genera within the pike-characin family, Ctenoluciidae, which is in the suborder Characoidei of the order Characiformes.

== Etymology ==
Ctenolucius beani is one of two species in the genus Ctenolucius. This name combines cteno, from the Greek ktenós, meaning "comb", and the Latin lucius, which means "pike". The specific name, beani, honours the American ichthyologist Barton Appler Bean, who was assistant curator of fishes at the United States National Museum and the brother of the ichthyologist Tarleton Hoffman Bean.

== Description ==
Ctenolucius beani has a maximum standard length28.6 cm (11.3 in). There are between 9 and 11 soft rays supporting the dorsal fin, and 10 to 13 supporting the anal fin. This species differs from its congener, C. hujeta, in having dark, wavy stripes on the body in all individuals with a standard length greater than roughly 80 mm (3.1 in), while in C. hujeta these are typically absent.

== Distribution and habitat ==
Ctenolucius beani is found in northern Colombia and Panama. Its range extends along the Pacific slope of Panama, from the Santa Maria River drainage east to the Colmbian border, and then south on both the Atlantic and Pacific slopes of Colombia in the Atrato and San Juan River drainage systems to the Mira River drainage system. It is found in rivers, lakes, streams and marshlands, as well as canals, where the bed is made up of sand and decomposing plant material.
