= R. candida =

R. candida may refer to:

- Rodriguezia candida, an orchid species found from northern South America to Brazil
- Ramularia candida, a synonym for Nectria ramulariae, a plant pathogenic fungus species

== See also ==
- Candida (disambiguation)
