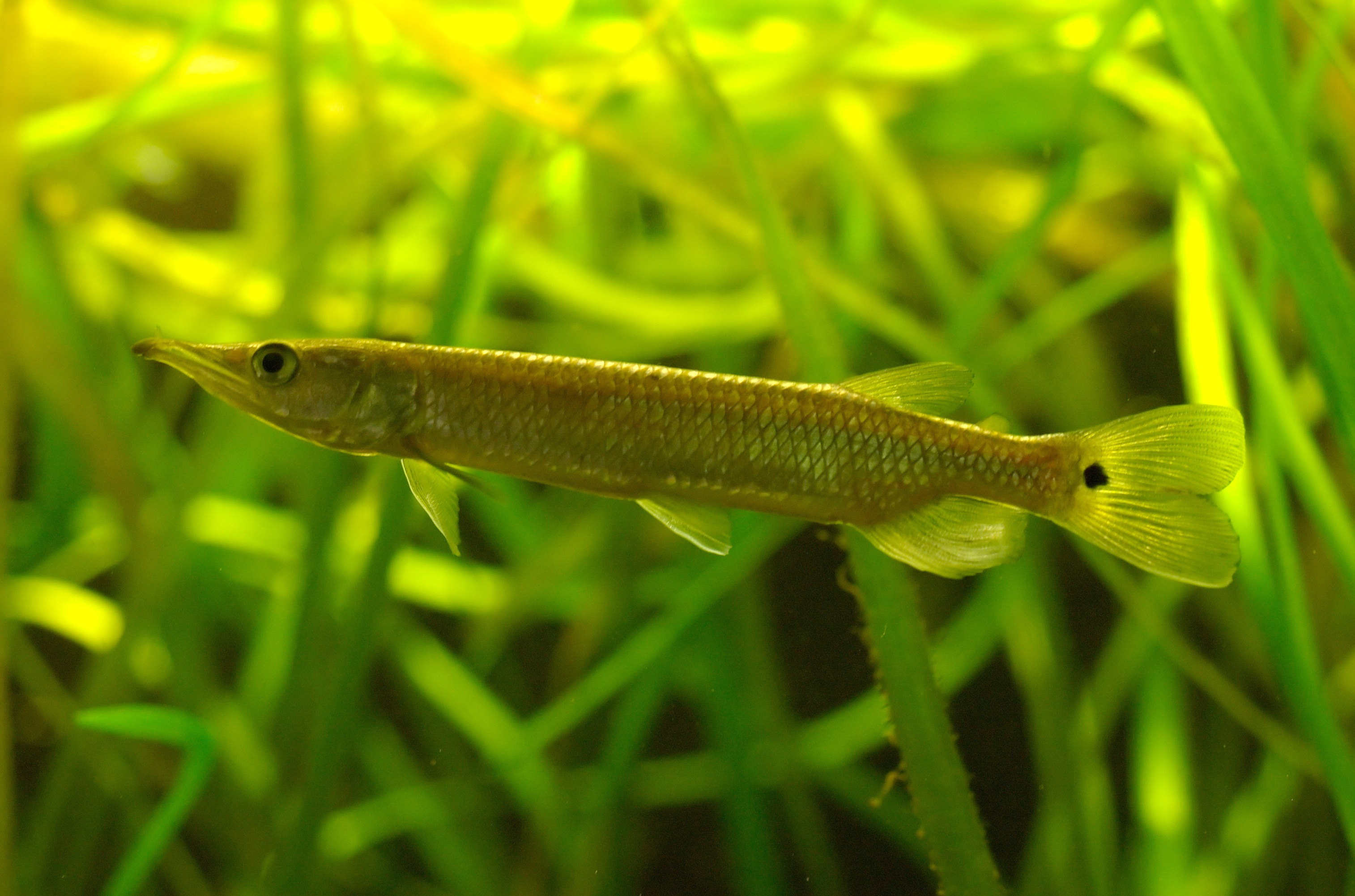
- Ctenolucius hujeta

Scientific classification
- Kingdom: Animalia
- Phylum: Chordata
- Class: Actinopterygii
- Order: Characiformes
- Family: Ctenoluciidae
- Genus: Ctenolucius; T. N. Gill, 1861

Type species
- Xiphostoma hujeta Valenciennes, 1850

Synonyms
- Luciocharax Steindachner, 1878; Belonocharax Fowler, 1907

= Ctenolucius =

Genus of fishes

Ctenolucius is a genus of freshwater ray-finned fishes belonging to the family Ctenoluciidae, the pike-characins. The fishes in this family are found in the Neotropics, in Panama and northern South America.

== Species ==
Ctenolucius contains the following valid species:

- Ctenolucius beani (Fowler, 1907)
- Ctenolucius hujeta (Valenciennes, 1850) (gar characin)
