= Enes (beetle) =

Scientific classification
- Kingdom: Animalia
- Phylum: Arthropoda
- Class: Insecta
- Order: Coleoptera
- Suborder: Polyphaga
- Infraorder: Cucujiformia
- Family: Cerambycidae
- Tribe: Acanthocinini
- Genus: Enes

Genus of beetles

Enes is a genus of beetles in the family Cerambycidae, containing the following species:

- Enes alboguttatus Breuning, 1957
- Enes aruensis Breuning, 1959
- Enes bakeri Fisher, 1925
- Enes enganensis Breuning, 1956
- Enes familiaris Pascoe, 1864
- Enes intinctus Pascoe, 1864
- Enes irritans Pascoe, 1864
- Enes juvencus Pascoe, 1864
- Enes luzonicus Fisher, 1925
- Enes marmoratus Fisher, 1925
- Enes obliquus Pascoe, 1864
- Enes pallidus Fisher, 1925
- Enes porcellus Pascoe, 1864
- Enes pulicaris Pascoe, 1864
- Enes scutellaris Fisher, 1925
- Enes setiger Fisher, 1925
- Enes sibuyanus Fisher, 1925
- Enes spinosus Fisher, 1925
