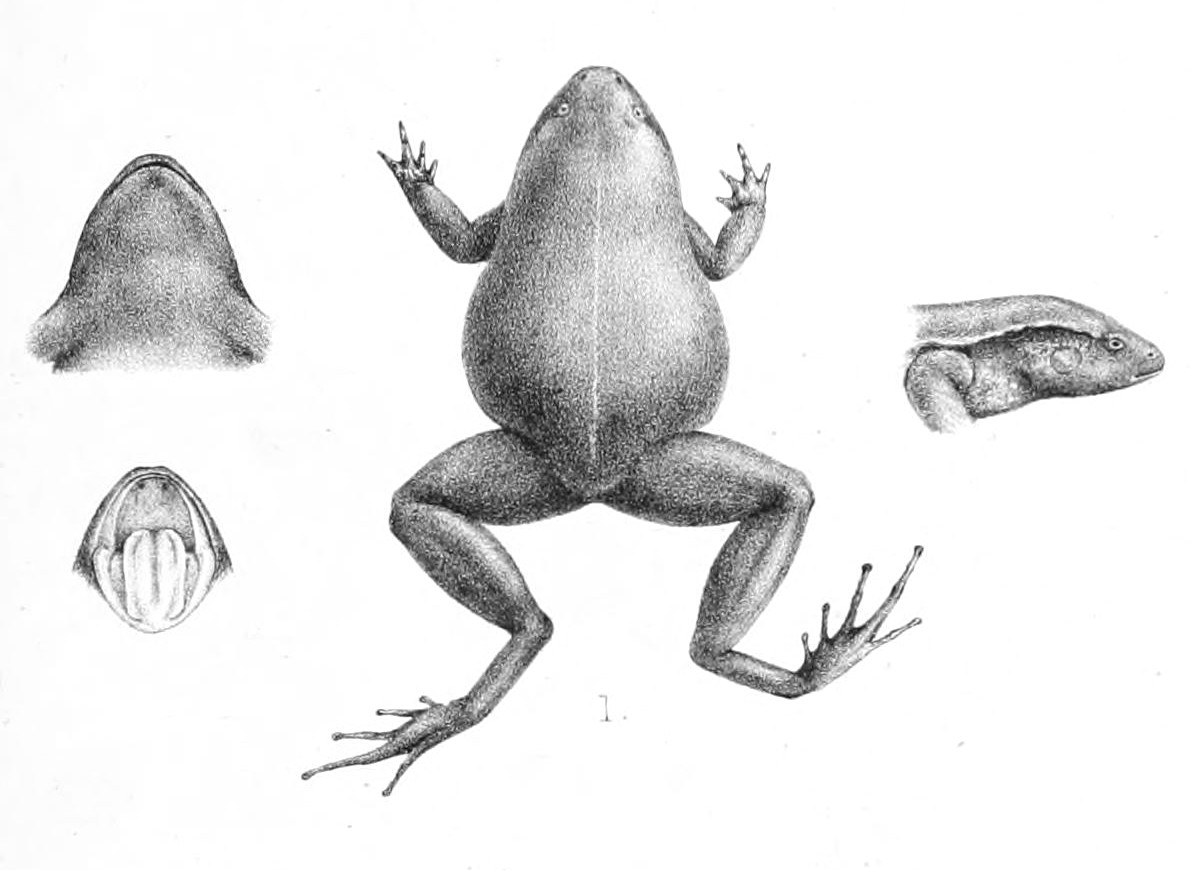
- Barygenys atra

Scientific classification
- Domain: Eukaryota
- Kingdom: Animalia
- Phylum: Chordata
- Class: Amphibia
- Order: Anura
- Family: Microhylidae
- Subfamily: Asterophryinae
- Genus: Barygenys; Parker, 1936

Type species
- Barygenys cheesmanae Parker, 1936

Species
- 9, see text

= Barygenys =

Genus of amphibians

Barygenys is a genus of microhylid frogs. They are endemic to New Guinea and the adjacent Louisiade Archipelago. So far only known from Papua New Guinea, the range of the genus is expected to reach Papua province in the Indonesian part of New Guinea. Despite not being known from Papua, common name Papua frogs has been suggested for them.

== Description ==
Barygenys have squat body, narrow head, and tiny eyes. Barygenys are unique among asterophryine frogs in that they bear vertical ridges (or traces thereof) on the snout, and in having short, sharply tapering fingers with narrowly rounded tips. The largest species (Barygenys resima) reaches a body size around 45 mm (1.8 in) in snout–vent length, while Barygenys parvula is not known to exceed 20 mm (0.79 in) SVL.

== Ecology ==
Barygenys are burrowing frogs. They tend to have spotty distributions and are rarely collected, and consequently poorly known.

== Species ==
As of early 2017, nine species are recognized:

- Barygenys apodasta Kraus, 2013
- Barygenys atra (Günther, 1896)
- Barygenys cheesmanae Parker, 1936
- Barygenys exsul Zweifel, 1963
- Barygenys flavigularis Zweifel, 1972
- Barygenys maculata Menzies and Tyler, 1977
- Barygenys nana Zweifel, 1972
- Barygenys parvula Zweifel, 1981
- Barygenys resima Kraus, 2013
