= Enes alboguttatus =

Scientific classification
- Kingdom: Animalia
- Phylum: Arthropoda
- Class: Insecta
- Order: Coleoptera
- Suborder: Polyphaga
- Infraorder: Cucujiformia
- Family: Cerambycidae
- Genus: Enes
- Species: E. alboguttatus

Binomial name
- Enes alboguttatus Breuning, 1957

Species of beetle

Enes alboguttatus is a species of beetle in the family Cerambycidae. It was described by Breuning in 1957.
