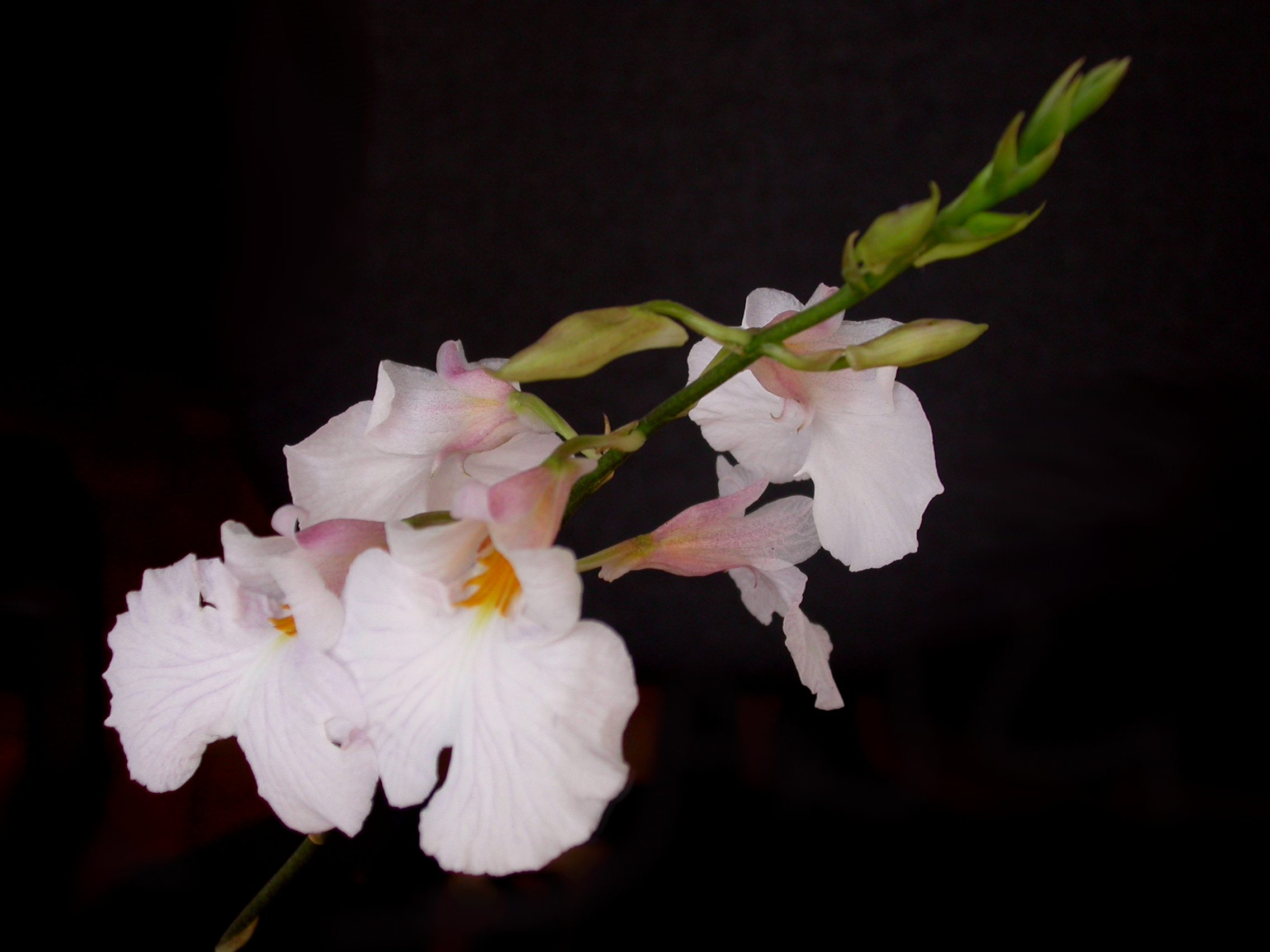
- Flower of Rodriguezia obtusifolia

Scientific classification
- Kingdom: Plantae
- Clade: Embryophytes
- Clade: Tracheophytes
- Clade: Spermatophytes
- Clade: Angiosperms
- Clade: Monocots
- Order: Asparagales
- Family: Orchidaceae
- Subfamily: Epidendroideae
- Genus: Rodriguezia
- Species: R. obtusifolia

Binomial name
- Rodriguezia obtusifolia (Lindl.) Rchb.f.

Synonyms
- Burlingtonia obtusifolia Lindl. (basionym)

= Rodriguezia obtusifolia =

Species of orchid

Rodriguezia obtusifolia is a species of orchid endemic to eastern Brazil.
