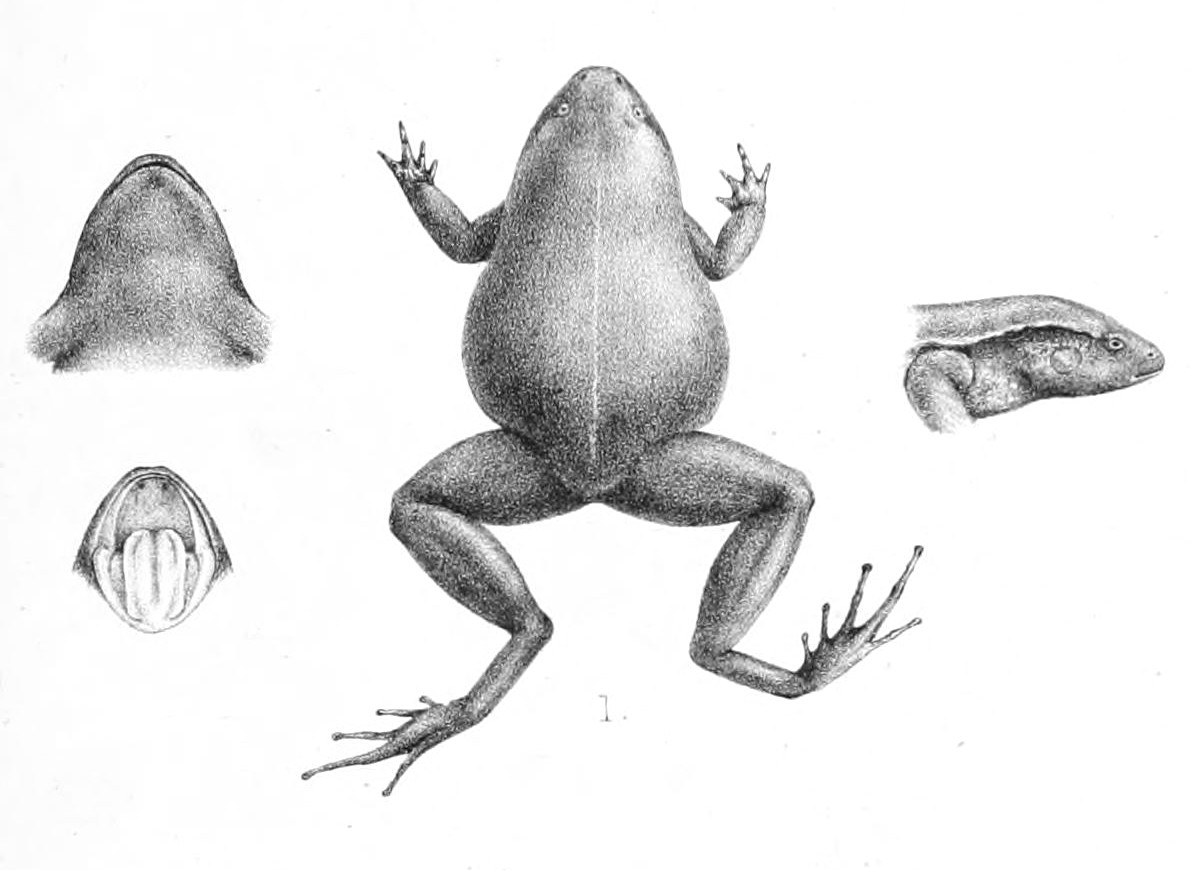

Conservation status
- Least Concern (IUCN 3.1)

Scientific classification
- Kingdom: Animalia
- Phylum: Chordata
- Class: Amphibia
- Order: Anura
- Family: Microhylidae
- Genus: Barygenys
- Species: B. atra

Binomial name
- Barygenys atra (Günther, 1896)

Synonyms
- Xenorhina atra Günther, 1896; Metopostira atra (Günther, 1896)

= Barygenys atra =

Species of frog

Barygenys atra is a species of frog in the family Microhylidae. It is endemic to eastern New Guinea and is known from the Morobe and Northern Provinces, Papua New Guinea. Common name Gunther's Papua frog has been proposed for it.

== Description ==
Barygenys atra is a heavy-bodied frog with a comparatively small head, moderately long hind limbs, and pointed nose. It grows to at least 41 mm (1.6 in) in snout–vent length (the holotype, sex unspecified). The snout shows only the faintest trace of the three vertical ridges that are prominent in other Barygenys species. The eyes are very small. The tympanum is scarcely visible; a weakly developed supratympanic fold is present. The fingers are short, broad at the base and tapering to narrowly rounded tips. The toe tips are broadened into small discs. No webbing is present. Preserved specimens are dorsally dark purplish brown, with a thin vertebral line. A living specimen was dorsally reddish brown with some black spots; the flanks were very dark gray, almost black.

== Habitat and conservation ==
Barygenys atra occurs in lowland and hill forests at elevations below 700 m (2,300 ft), but its specific habitat requirements are poorly known. Development is direct (i.e., there is no free-living larval stage). There are no known threats to this species. It is not known to occur in any protected areas.
