= Barygenys nana =

Conservation status
- Least Concern (IUCN 3.1)

Scientific classification
- Kingdom: Animalia
- Phylum: Chordata
- Class: Amphibia
- Order: Anura
- Family: Microhylidae
- Genus: Barygenys
- Species: B. nana

Binomial name
- Barygenys nana Zweifel, 1972

Species of frog

Barygenys nana is a species of frog in the family Microhylidae. It is endemic to New Guinea and is known from the mountains of Eastern Highlands and Western Highlands Provinces, Papua New Guinea. The specific name nana refers to the small size of this species. Common name highland Papua frog has been proposed for it.

== Description ==
The holotype, a male presumed to be adult, measures 21 mm (0.83 in) in snout–vent length, whereas adult females measure 23–26 mm (0.91–1.02 in) in snout–vent length. The eyes are small, although relatively large compared to other Barygenys species. The snout is pointed. The tympanum is only faintly visible. The fingers are short, broad at the base but tapering to narrow, rounded tips. The toes are unwebbed. Skin is smooth, except in the post-sacral region and the hind legs where it becomes pustulose; the degree of rugosity varies greatly between individuals. Preserved specimens are dorsally light brown with some darker infuscation. The ventral surfaces are light brown with fine, darker mottling. The chin is slightly lighter than the rest of the lower surfaces.

== Habitat and conservation ==
Barygenys nana is known from a number of high-altitude localities, presumably representing montane rainforests and forest/grassland mosaics, at 1,800–3,500 m (5,900–11,500 ft) above sea level. It is considered not to be common. Development is presumably direct (i.e., there is no free-living larval stage). There are no known threats to this species. It is not known to occur in any protected areas.
