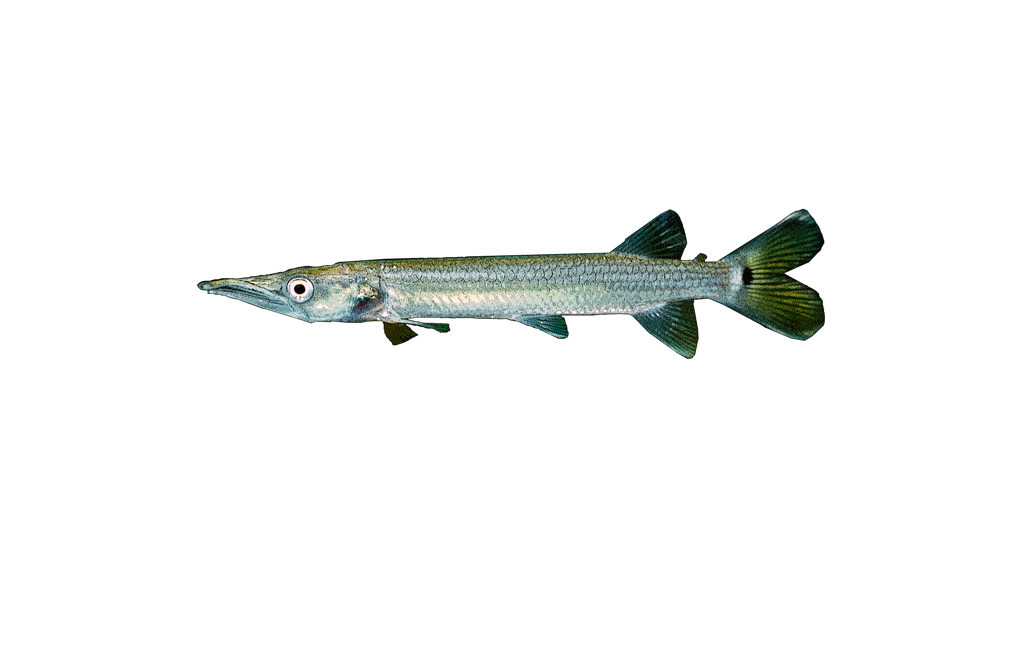

Conservation status
- Least Concern (IUCN 3.1)

Scientific classification
- Kingdom: Animalia
- Phylum: Chordata
- Class: Actinopterygii
- Order: Characiformes
- Family: Ctenoluciidae
- Genus: Ctenolucius
- Species: C. hujeta

Binomial name
- Ctenolucius hujeta (Valenciennes, 1850)

Synonyms
- Xiphostoma hujeta Valenciennes, 1850; Luciocharax insculptus Steindachner, 1878

= Ctenolucius hujeta =

Species of fish

Ctenolucius hujeta, the silver gar, rocket gar, hujeta gar and freshwater barracuda, is a species of freshwater ray-finned fish belonging to the family Ctenoluciidae, the pike-characins. This fish is found in Panama and northern South America.

== Taxonomy ==
Ctenolucius hujeta was first formally described as Xiphostoma hujeta by the French zoologist Achille Valenciennes in Volume 22 of Histoire naturelle des poissons, coauthored with Georges Cuvier, which was published in 1850. The type locality was given as the rivers of the Lake Maracaibo basin in Venezuela. The genus name Xiphostoma was proposed in 1829 by Louis Agassiz, but this name was preoccupied by Xiphostoma Kirby & Spence, 1828 in the insect order Hemiptera. However, in 1861, Theodore Gill proposed the new monospecific genus Ctenolucius for this species, making this species the type species of that genus by monotypy. Ctenolucius is one of two genera within the pike-characin family, Ctenoluciidae, which is in the suborder Characoidei of the order Characiformes.

== Etymology ==
Ctenolucius hujeta is one of two species in the genus Ctenolucius. The name combines cteno, from the Greek ktenós meaning "comb", and the Latin lucius, which means "pike". The specific name, hujeta, is a local vernacular name for this species among Venezuelan fishermen.

== Description ==
Ctenolucius hujeta has both its dorsal and anal fins supported by 10 or 11 soft rays. It has an elongated body with a maximum standard length of 26 cm (10 in). This species differs from its congener, C. beani, by having no horizontal lines on the body, or, if they are preset, they are very indistinct. However, some larger specimens may show more distinct lines than the smaller ones. There are also skeletal and scale count differences.

== Distribution and habitat ==
Ctenolucius hujeta is found in northern South America, where it occurs in the Magdalena, Cauca, and Sinu River basins in Colombia and in the Lake Maracaibo drainage system in Venezuela. It can be found in rivers, streams, floodplains, lakes, and wetlands.

== Gallery ==
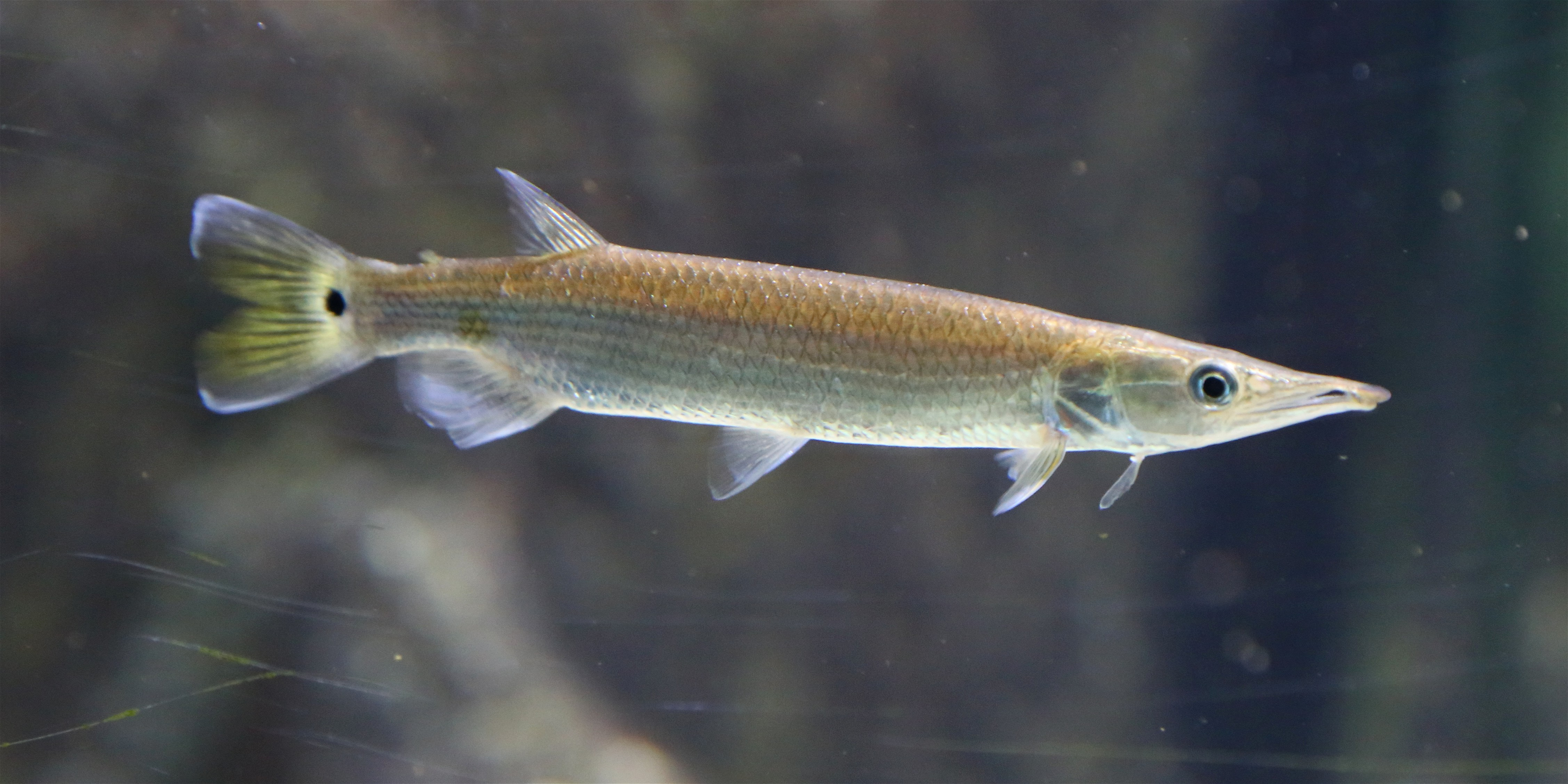

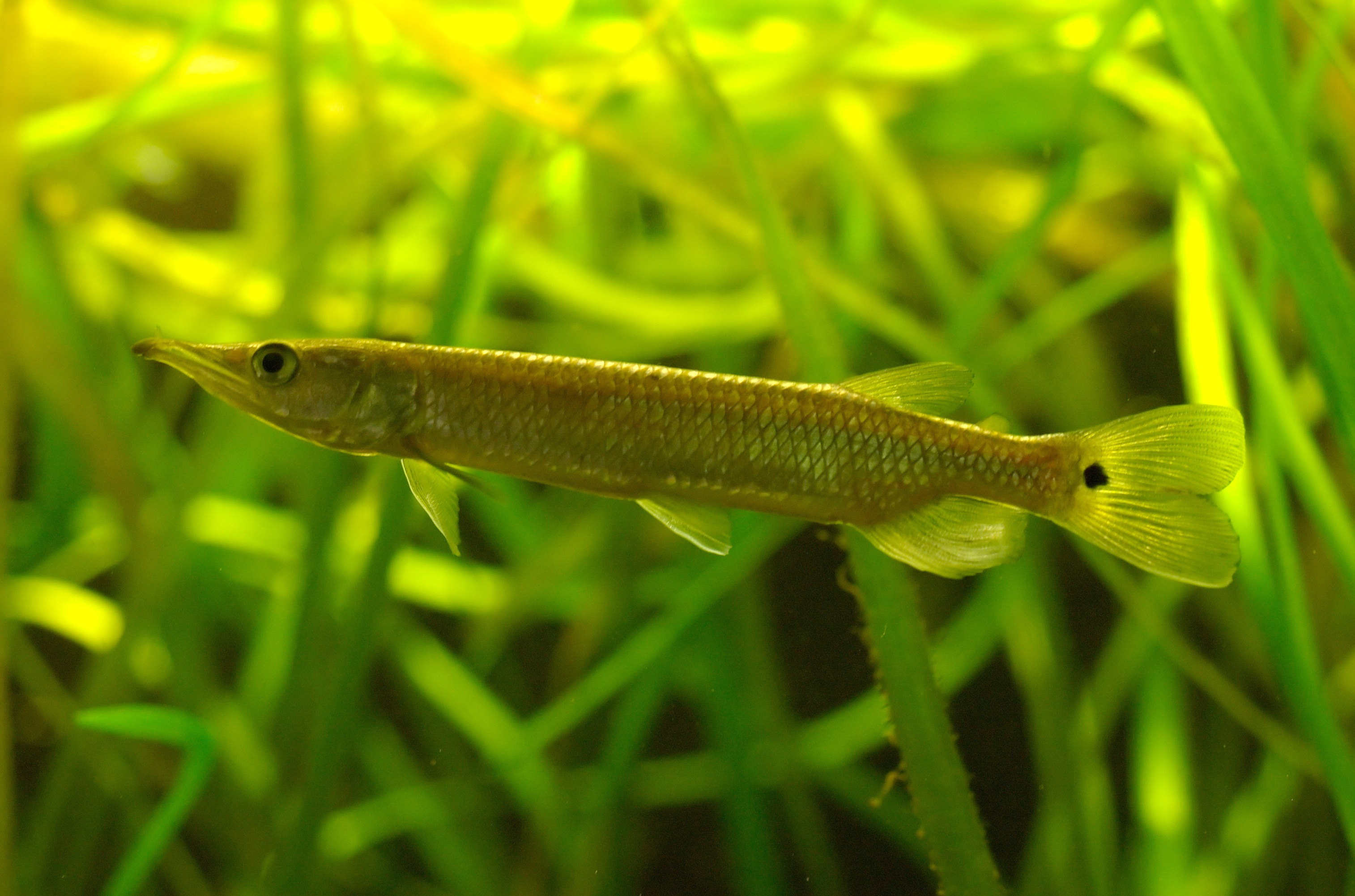
