= Begonia corallina =

Scientific classification
- Kingdom: Plantae
- Clade: Embryophytes
- Clade: Tracheophytes
- Clade: Angiosperms
- Clade: Eudicots
- Clade: Rosids
- Order: Cucurbitales
- Family: Begoniaceae
- Genus: Begonia
- Species: B. corallina

Binomial name
- Begonia corallina Carrière

Synonyms
- Begonia carollina F.A.Barkley & Golding

Species of flowering plant

Begonia corallina is a species of flowering plant in the family Begoniaceae. It is native to Brazil.

== Habitat and ecology ==
Begonia corallina is known from four areas with populations of around one to two mature individuals restricted to the Parque Estadual da Pedra Branca, in the metropolitan region of the state of Rio de Janeiro, Brazil. It grows in submontane to montane forests at an elevation of 100–620 m (330–2,030 ft) on rock faces with accumulations of leaf litter or on the ground in shady localities.

== Taxonomy and nomenclature ==
Begonia corallina was previously recognized as a synonym of Begonia maculata, but has since been re-established as a valid species in 2023. It can be distinguished by its coral-red inflorescence, flowers and immature fruit, broadly ovate outer tepals of the staminate flowers and cordiform (heart-shaped) capsules.

It is placed under Begonia sect. Gaerdtia, together with species like Begonia maculata.
