= Enes bakeri =

Scientific classification
- Kingdom: Animalia
- Phylum: Arthropoda
- Class: Insecta
- Order: Coleoptera
- Suborder: Polyphaga
- Infraorder: Cucujiformia
- Family: Cerambycidae
- Genus: Enes
- Species: E. bakeri

Binomial name
- Enes bakeri Fisher, 1925

Species of beetle

Enes bakeri is a species of beetle in the family Cerambycidae. It was described by Fisher in 1925.
