= Barygenys cheesmanae =

Conservation status
- Data Deficient (IUCN 3.1)

Scientific classification
- Kingdom: Animalia
- Phylum: Chordata
- Class: Amphibia
- Order: Anura
- Family: Microhylidae
- Genus: Barygenys
- Species: B. cheesmanae

Binomial name
- Barygenys cheesmanae Parker, 1936
- Barygenys cheesmanae is only known from Mount Tafa in Papua New Guinea

Species of amphibian

Barygenys cheesmanae is a species of frogs in the family Microhylidae. It is endemic to eastern New Guinea and is only known from Mount Tafa in Central Province, Papua New Guinea. The specific name cheesmanae honors Lucy Evelyn Cheesman, an English entomologist, explorer, curator at London Zoo, and collector of the holotype. Common name Cheesman's Papua frog has been coined for this species.

== Description ==
Barygenys cheesmanae grows to 40 mm (1.6 in) in snout–vent length. It has a globose body, a narrow head with pointed snout, and very short hind limbs. The snout bears three conspicuous vertical ridges. The tympanum is present but indistinct; a weakly developed supratympanic fold is present. The fingers are short, broad at the base, and tapering to narrowly rounded tips. The toe tips are rounded, without terminal grooves or dilations. No webbing is present. The dorsal groundcolor varies from brownish yellow to pale brown to deep red-brown. A number of more or less black spots are irregularly scattered on the dorsum. Some pink spots may also be present. The hind limbs are darker and may have some reddish color. The lower surfaces vary from dirty yellow to brown.

== Habitat and conservation ==
Barygenys cheesmanae is known from montane rainforest at elevations of 2,070–2,590 m (6,790–8,500 ft) above sea level. Its ecology is poorly known, but it is probably a secretive and terrestrial species; the species describer noted this frog as living in holes in the ground. Males call throughout the day. Development is presumably direct (i.e., there is no free-living larval stage). There are no known threats to this species that is considered to live in a remote area. It is not known to occur in any protected areas.
