= Barygenys parvula =

Conservation status
- Near Threatened (IUCN 3.1)

Scientific classification
- Kingdom: Animalia
- Phylum: Chordata
- Class: Amphibia
- Order: Anura
- Family: Microhylidae
- Genus: Barygenys
- Species: B. parvula

Binomial name
- Barygenys parvula Zweifel, 1981

Species of frog

Barygenys parvula is a species of frog in the family Microhylidae. It is endemic to New Guinea and is only known from the Adelbert Mountains, an isolated coastal range on the north coast of Papua New Guinea. The specific name parvula is from the Latin adjective meaning small, in reference to the small size of this frog.

Type locality of Barygenys parvula in the Adelbert Mountains of New Guinea

== Description ==
The type series consists of two adult males measuring 17.6 and 18.7 mm (0.69 and 0.74 in) in snout–vent length. The body is robust, with broad head, truncate shout, relatively short legs, and small eyes. The tympanum is inconspicuous. The fingers are short and unwebbed; the toes are unwebbed and have slightly expanded digital disks. The skin is somewhat warty. The dorsum is brown with indistinct markings. The ventral surfaces are finely mottled in dark and light brown.

The male advertisement call has been described as "a series of rapid, high-pitched peeps".

== Habitat and conservation ==
Barygenys parvula inhabits primary tropical rainforest at about 1,500 m (4,900 ft) above sea level. It is a ground-dwelling species. It appears to adaptable and be able to survive in secondary and degraded habitats. It seems be common at the type locality. It is not considered to be significantly threatened by habitat loss, despite human settlement and forest loss, because of its adaptability.
