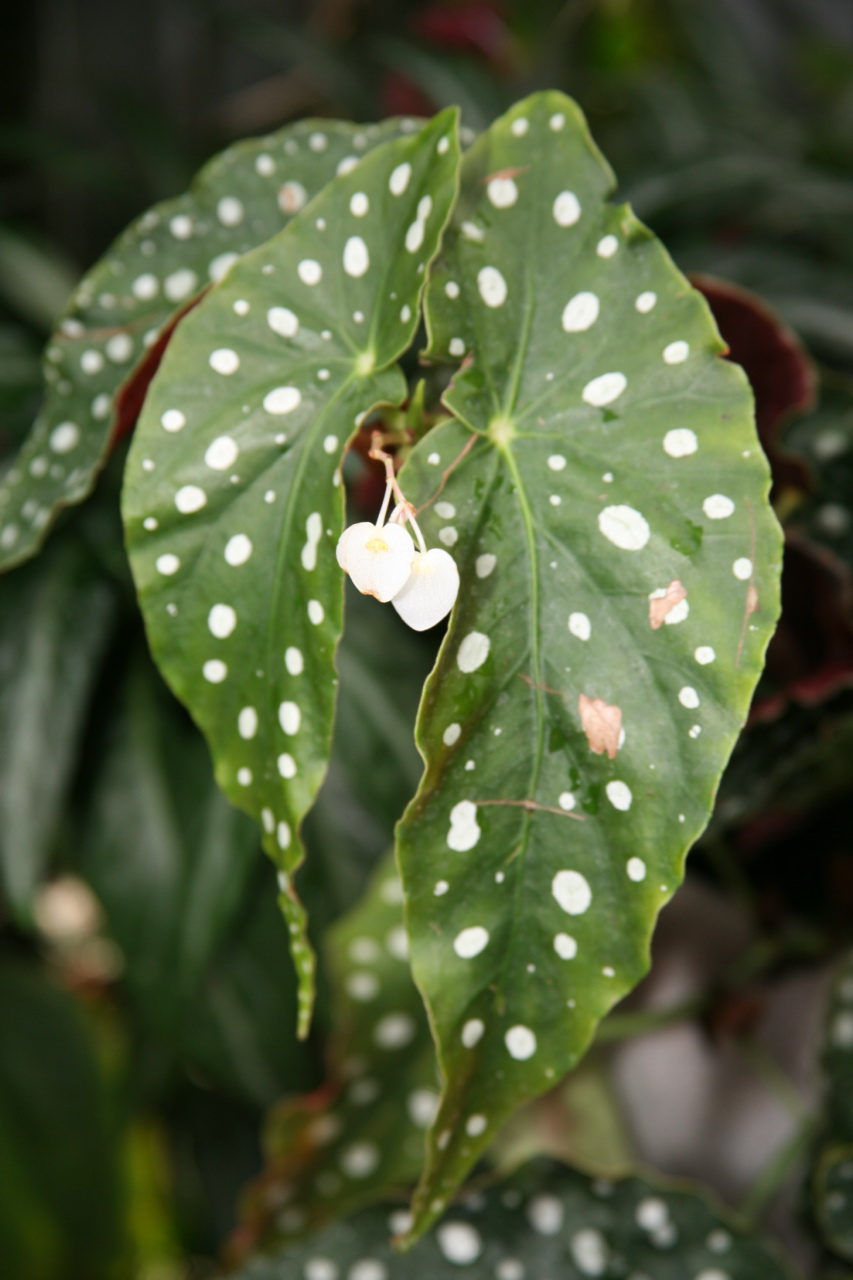

Scientific classification
- Kingdom: Plantae
- Clade: Tracheophytes
- Clade: Angiosperms
- Clade: Eudicots
- Clade: Rosids
- Order: Cucurbitales
- Family: Begoniaceae
- Genus: Begonia
- Species: B. maculata

Binomial name
- Begonia maculata Raddi

Synonyms
- List: Begonia aculeata Walp.; Begonia argyrostigma Fisch. ex Link & Otto; Begonia maculata var. argentea (Klotzsch) A.DC.; Begonia maculata f. argentea (Klotzsch) Voss; Begonia punctata Steud.; Gaerdtia argentea Klotzsch; Gaerdtia maculata (Raddi) Klotzsch

= Begonia maculata =

Species of flowering plant

Begonia maculata (maculata meaning "spotted"), the polka dot begonia, is a species of begonia native to southeast Brazil. It grows naturally in the understory of the Atlantic rainforest, with occurrences confirmed in the Brazilian states of Espírito Santo and Rio de Janeiro. It has been introduced into Mexico, Cuba, the Dominican Republic, and Argentina.

== Description ==
Begonia maculata has olive drab colored oblong leaves with silver dots. The undersides of the leaves are red-purple. The plant grows white or pink flowers in clusters with yellow centers on a single stem.

== Taxonomy and history ==
B. maculata is placed under Begonia sect. Gaerdtia, whose members are all mostly found in southern Brazil. Its closest relative is Begonia coccinea.

The tree below illustrates the phylogenetic relationship between B. maculata and its relatives in Begonia sect. Gaerdtia:

- sect. Gaerdtia
  - - - B. lunaris
      - B. dichroa
    - - B. undulata
      - - - B. salicifolia
          - - - B. corallina
        - - - B. macduffieana
            - - - B. maculata
                - B. coccinea
- sect. Latistigma

B. maculata was first documented by botanists based on a specimen found on the mountain Corcovado in central Rio de Janeiro. Giuseppe Raddi named and described the species in 1820. It is thought B. maculata is one of the 4000 specimens he acquired from a 7-month trip to Brazil in 1817.

Before the twenty-first century, this plant was commonly called trout begonia, fish begonia, and sometimes clown begonia. It was not until polka (which was associated with spotted fabrics) became popular in the mid-1800s that B. maculata and another popular houseplant, Hypoestes phyllostachya started being referred to as polka dot plants.

== Physiology ==
The white/silver spots on the leaves are caused by air trapped in the epidermis, creating an effect known as blister variegation, or airspace variegation. One theory on the evolutionary biology of these spots is that they mimic the appearance of butterfly eggs (butterflies seem less likely to lay eggs on a plant that already has patches of eggs). Another possibility is these spots mimic pest damage from leaf miners.

== Horticulture ==
B. maculata is a perennially popular houseplant. As early as 1871, the California Horticulturist described B. maculata as "a very desirable variety," and as recently as 2023, #begoniamaculata was the second most popular species-specific begonia hashtag on Instagram.

== Propagation ==
The best conditions for propagating Begonia maculata are bright, indirect light and water poured just below the surface of the soil anytime it seems dry to the touch. Use filtered water or rainfall, it requires less water but more often than other tropical plants.

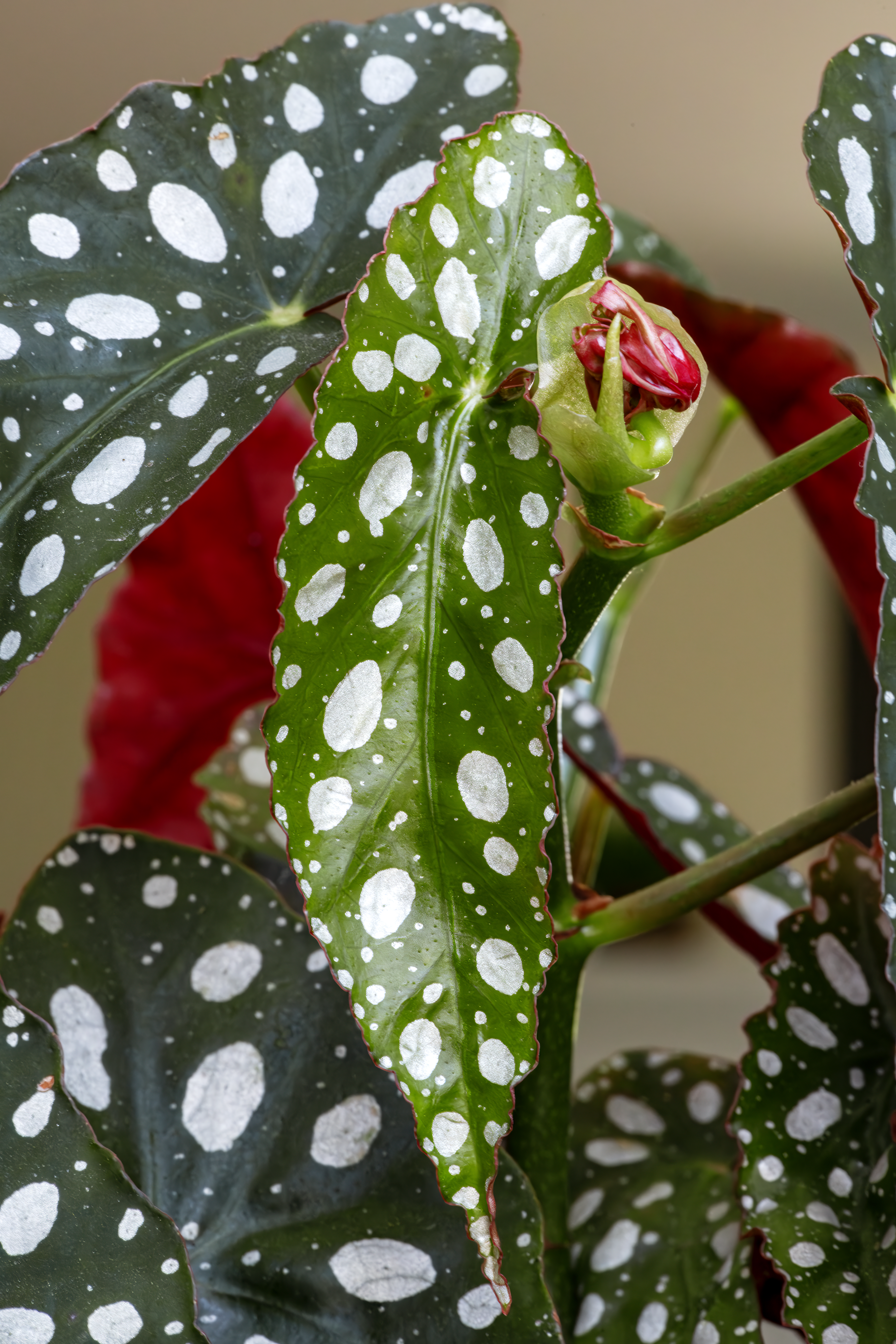
Young leaf

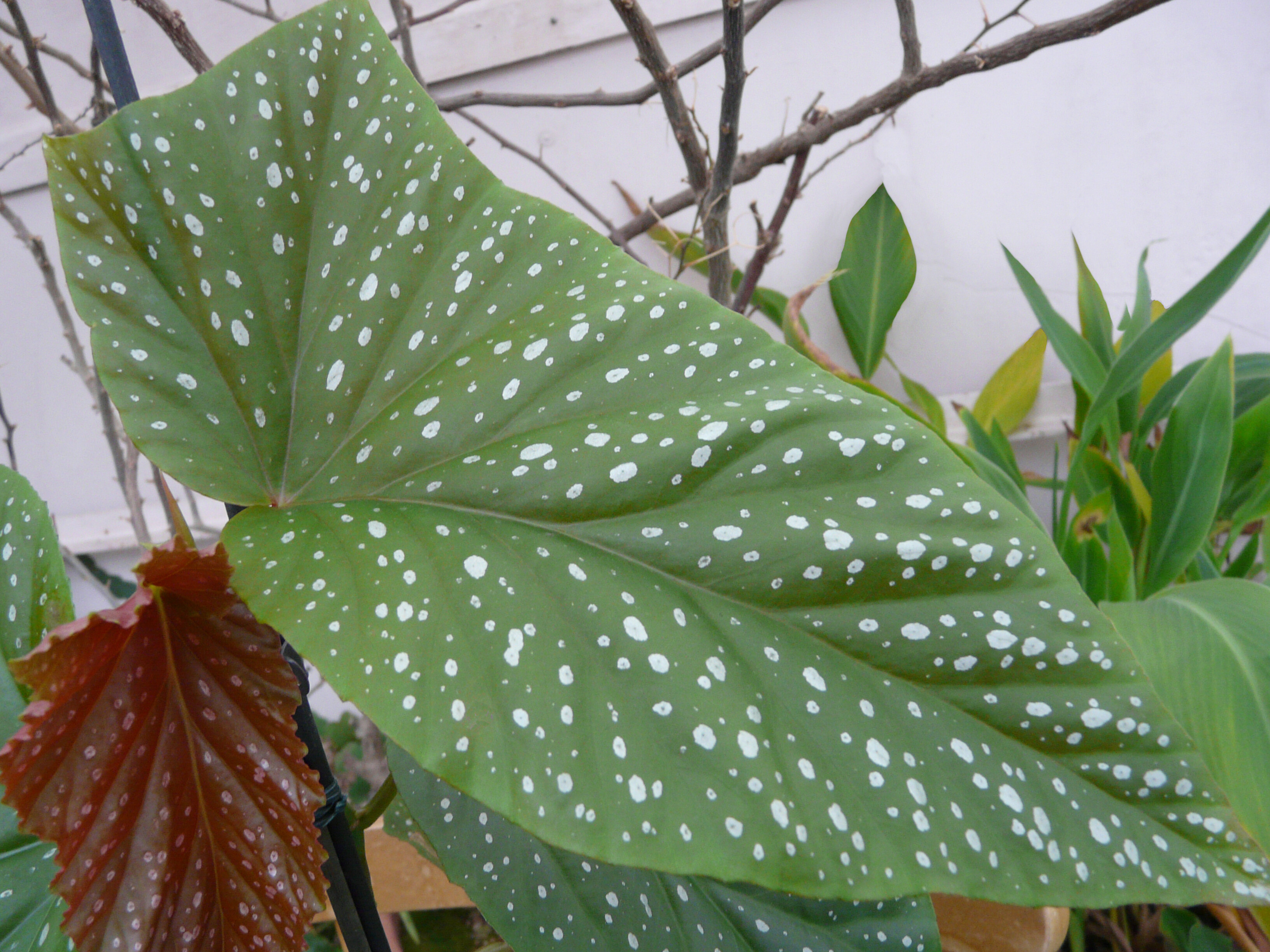
Leaf with silvery 'spattered' dots'

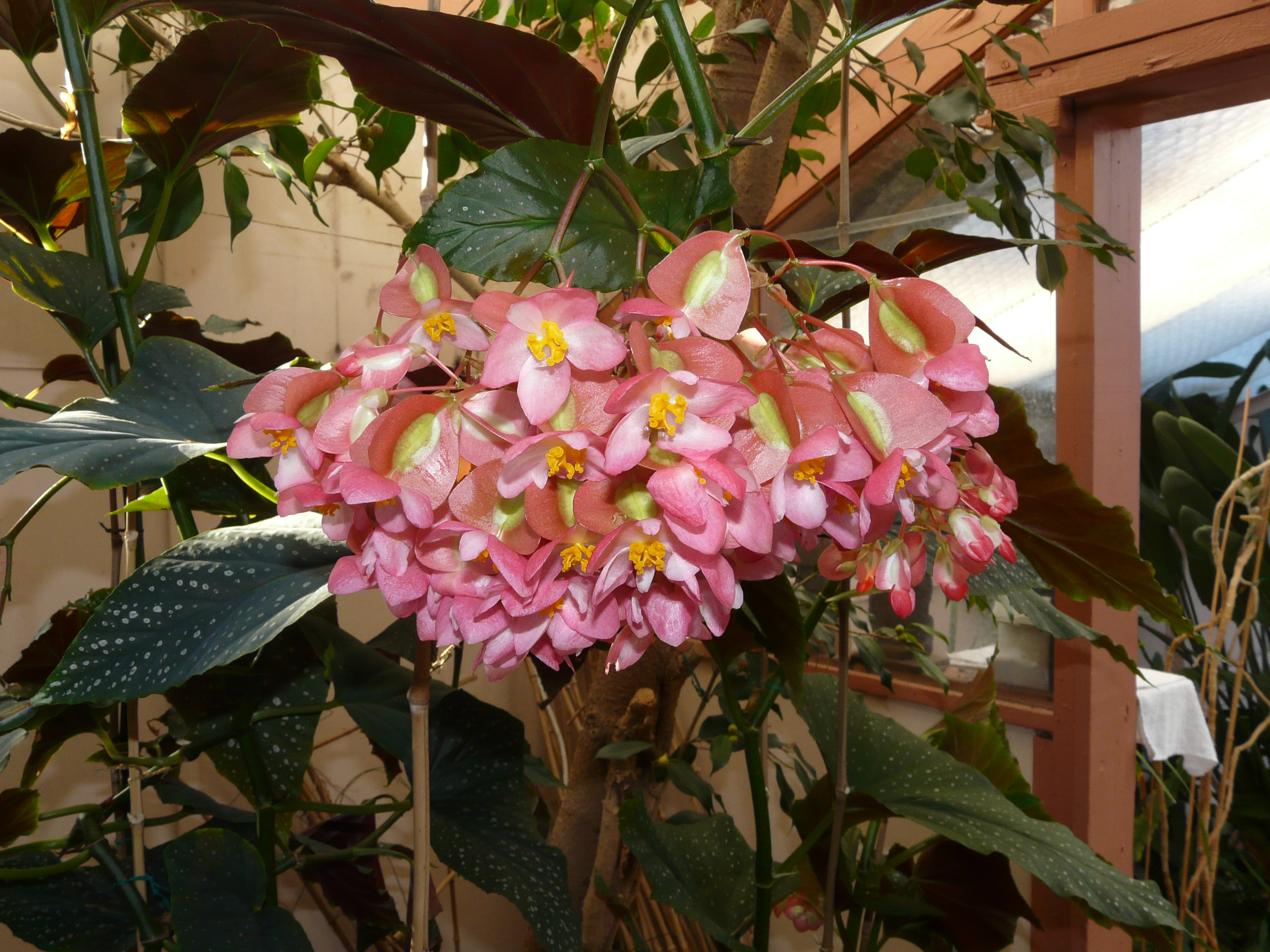
Bunch of female flowers

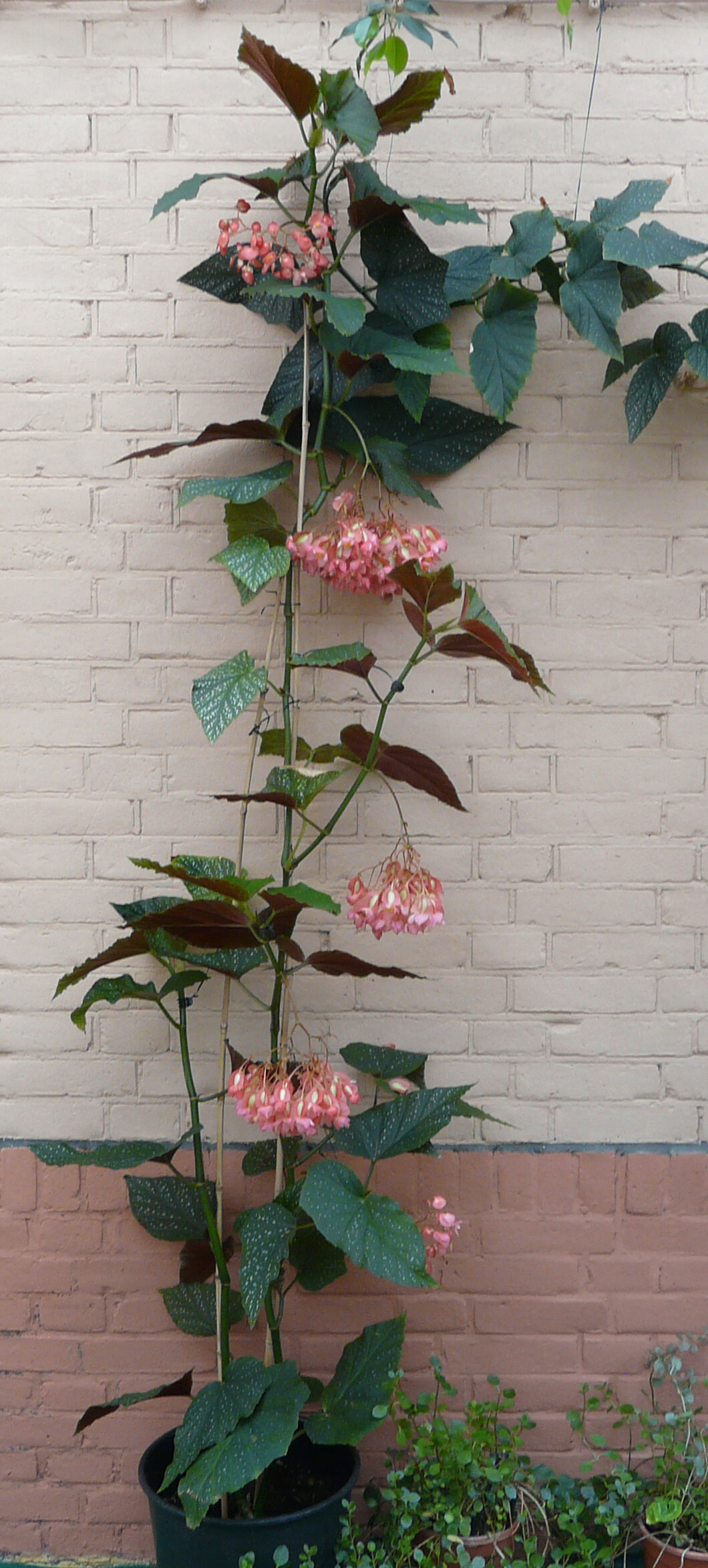
Climbing pink cultivar with male flowers (top and bottom) and female flowers (in between)

== Variegations ==
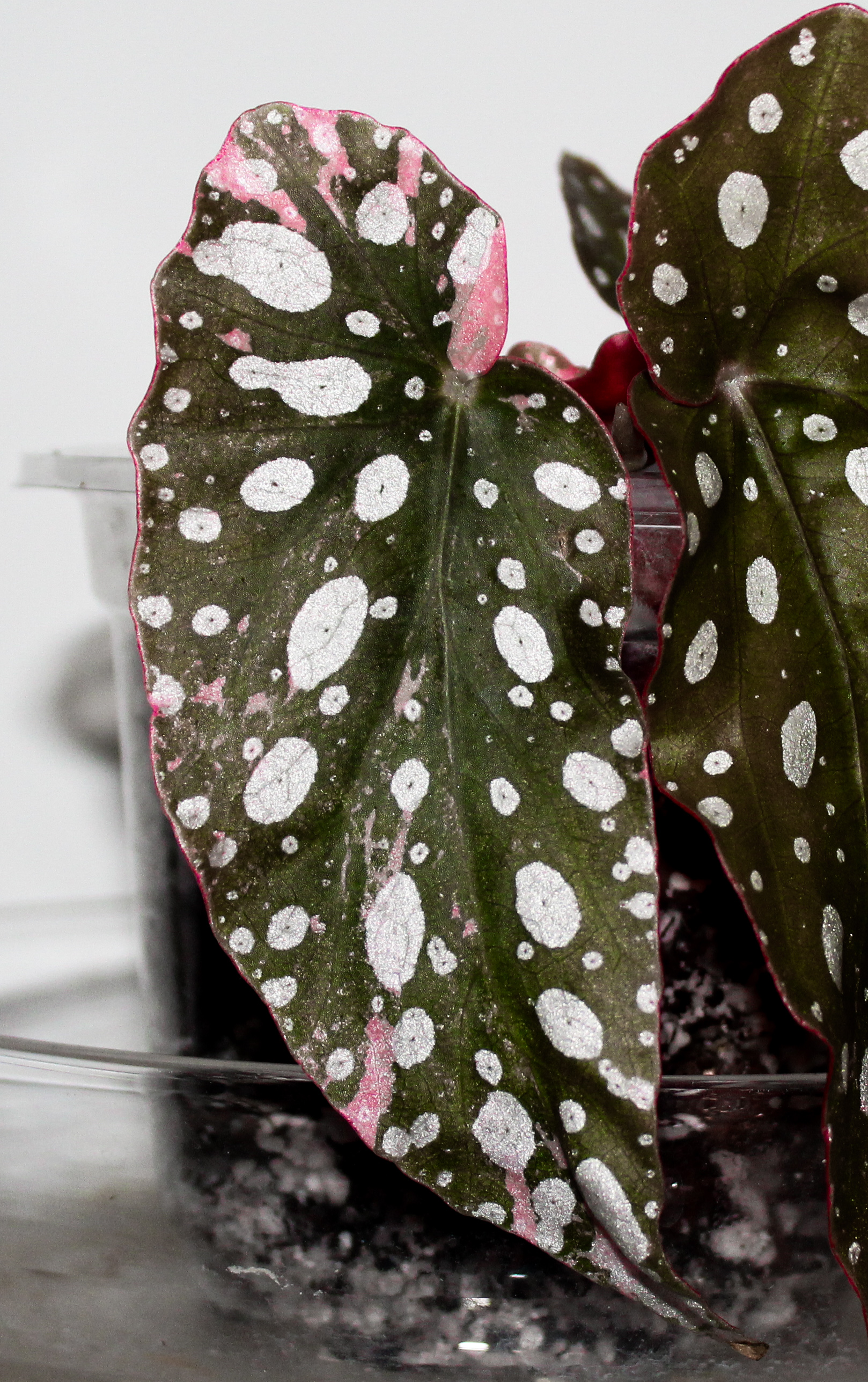
Single leaf close-up of the pink variegated begonia maculata

The pink variegated Begonia Maculata is a rare variegation, with pastel pink distributed in random patterns on the dark green leaves.

The pink variegation is becoming more widely available as this plant is easy to propagate.
