= Barygenys exsul =

Conservation status
- Least Concern (IUCN 3.1)

Scientific classification
- Kingdom: Animalia
- Phylum: Chordata
- Class: Amphibia
- Order: Anura
- Family: Microhylidae
- Genus: Barygenys
- Species: B. exsul

Binomial name
- Barygenys exsul Zweifel, 1963

Synonyms
- Baragenys exsul Zweifel, 1963 — incorrect original spelling of generic name

Species of frog

Barygenys exsul is a species of frog in the family Microhylidae. It is endemic to Papua New Guinea. It is known from Rossel (type locality) and Sudest Islands in the Louisiade Archipelago, east of New Guinea. It is uncertain whether the specimens from Sudest really are conspecific with this species. Barygenys apodasta and Barygenys resima were mixed with this species prior to their description in 2013.

== Description ==
Adult males measure 22.4–25.5 mm (0.88–1.00 in) and females 22.8–38.9 mm (0.90–1.53 in) in snout–vent length. The eyes are small. The tympanum is not evident or is indistinct. The fingers are short, unwebbed, and with rounded tips but lacking discs; the toes are unwebbed and have discs that are barely wider than width of penultimate phalanges. Coloration is dark brown or mud-brown, speckled with black or with obscure darker brown markings. Sometimes they can be uniform dark brown, or have a broad mud-brown vertebral stripe.

Males call at night from beneath the surface of the soil. The call is a rapid series of 4–9 boops.

== Habitat and conservation ==
Its natural habitats are primary or secondary lowland rainforests and cloudforests, and have been found at altitudes up to 720 m (2,360 ft) above sea level. It is a fossorial species that can be moderately common several centimeters beneath the soil surface. Development is presumably direct (i.e., there is no free-living larval stage).

The species is not facing major threats. It is utilized on Tagula for magic purposes—to provide fertility to land if planted—but the level of utilization is likely too low to constitute a major threat.
