= Barygenys flavigularis =

Conservation status
- Data Deficient (IUCN 3.1)

Scientific classification
- Kingdom: Animalia
- Phylum: Chordata
- Class: Amphibia
- Order: Anura
- Family: Microhylidae
- Genus: Barygenys
- Species: B. flavigularis

Binomial name
- Barygenys flavigularis Zweifel, 1972

Species of frog

Barygenys flavigularis is a species of frog in the family Microhylidae. It is endemic to Papua New Guinea, known from several localities in the mountains around Wau. Its natural habitat is subtropical or tropical moist montane forests. The population is unknown but is considered locally abundant and occurs in Mount Kaindi Wildlife Management Area.
