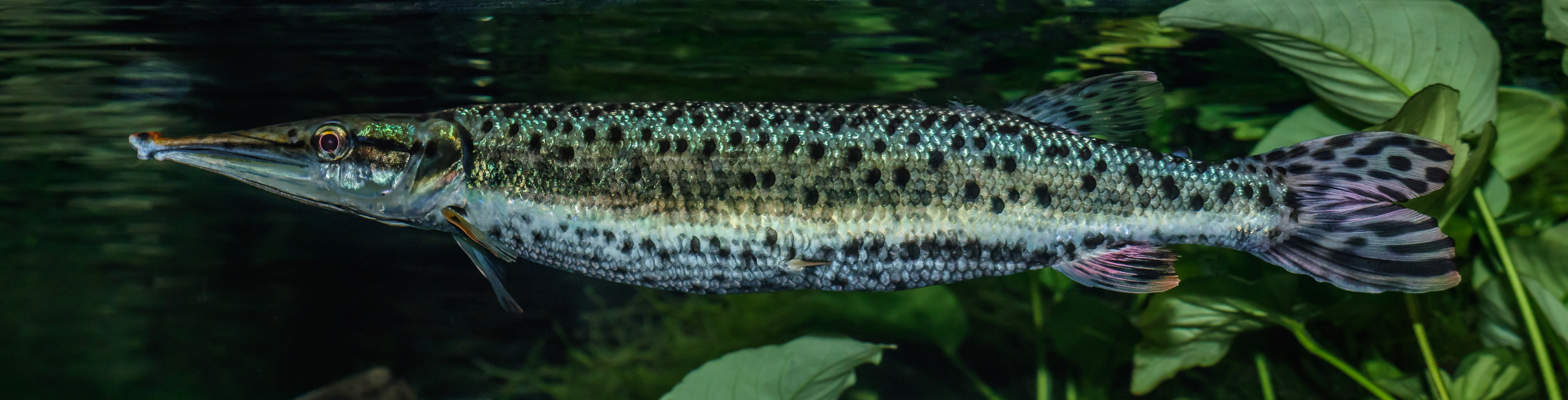

Conservation status
- Least Concern (IUCN 3.1)

Scientific classification
- Kingdom: Animalia
- Phylum: Chordata
- Class: Actinopterygii
- Order: Characiformes
- Family: Ctenoluciidae
- Genus: Boulengerella
- Species: B. maculata

Binomial name
- Boulengerella maculata (Valenciennes, 1850)

Synonyms
- Xiphostoma maculatum Valenciennes, 1850; Xiphostoma taedo Cope, 1872

= Boulengerella maculata =

Species of fish

Boulengerella maculata, the spotted pike-characin or agujeta, is a species of freshwater ray-finned fish belonging to the family Ctenoluciidae, the pike-characins. This species is found in tropical South America.

== Taxonomy ==
Boulengerella maculata was first formally described as Xiphostoma maculatum by the French zoologist Achille Valenciennes in Volume 22 of Histoire naturelle des poissons, coauthored with Georges Cuvier, which was published in 1850. The type locality was given as the Amazon River in Brazil. The genus name Xiphostoma was proposed in 1829 by Louis Agassiz but this name was preoccupied by Xiphostoma Kirby & Spence, 1828 in the insect order Hemiptera, and the name Boulengerella was proposed by Carl H. Eigenmann in 1903. Boulengerella is one of two genera within the pike-characin family, Ctenoluciidae, which is in the suborder Characoidei of the order Characiformes.

== Etymology ==
Boulengerella maculata is a member of the genus Boulangerella, this name suffixes -ella, which indicates endearment, onto the surname Boulenger, honouring the Belgian-born British ichthyologist and herpetologist George Albert Boulenger of the British Museum (Natural History) who described the type species of this genus, Xiphostoma lateristriga in 1895. The specific name, maculata, means "spotted", a reference to the spots on the dorsal, anal and caudal fins, although the body has spots too.

== Description ==
Boulengerella maculata has a maximum standard length of 31.9 cm (12.6 in). The dorsal fin is supported by between 9 and 11 soft rays while the anal fin contains between 10 and 12 soft rays. The dorsal fin is largely to the rear of the anal fin, a character shared with B. lateristriga, but not with any other species in the genus Boulengerella. Other distinguishing features include the absence of a thin stripe along the flanks, the marbled pattern of the caudal fin and the dark spotting on the upper flanks and back, as well as differing scale counts.

== Distribution and habitat ==
Boulengerella maculata is found in South America where it occurs in the river basins of the Amazon, Tocantins and Orinoco rivers in Bolivia, Brazil, Colombia, Ecuador, Peru and Venezuela. The spotted pike-characin is pelagic, the adults are sound in stretches of the main channels of rivers and larger tributaries which have an observable flow, in both white and blackwater rivers, they also occur in lakes on the floodplains of these rivers.

== Biology ==
Boulengerella maculata is a predatory species. The fishes in genus Boulengerella hunt by hiding in the shade on the margins of the lake or river. When they see potential prey, typically smaller fishes, they use their pectoral fins to propel them, stealthily, towards the prey and to manoeuvre around the prey. They then strike the prey with a fasy movement propelled by the caudal fin. Once caught, they prey is manipulated using the mouth and swallowed head first. The adults are usually solitary but will form small groupps while the juveniles are typically found in schools.

== Utilisation ==
Boulengerella maculata is wild caught for the aquarium trade, mainly from Brazil.
