= Enes familiaris =

Scientific classification
- Kingdom: Animalia
- Phylum: Arthropoda
- Class: Insecta
- Order: Coleoptera
- Suborder: Polyphaga
- Infraorder: Cucujiformia
- Family: Cerambycidae
- Genus: Enes
- Species: E. familiaris

Binomial name
- Enes familiaris Pascoe, 1864

Species of beetle

Enes familiaris is a species of beetle in the family Cerambycidae. It was described by Pascoe in 1864.
