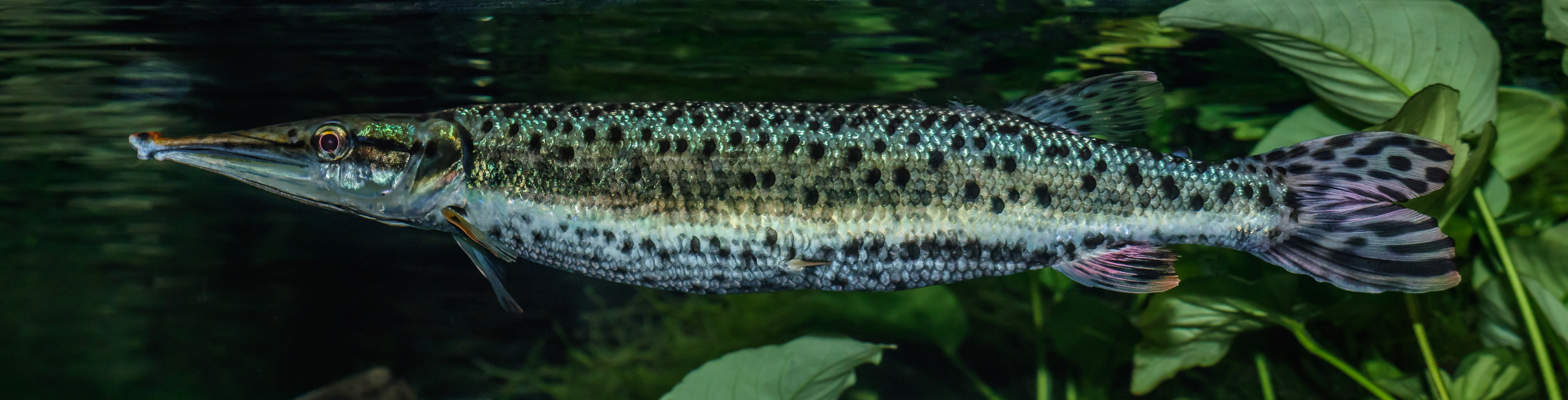
- Boulengerella maculata

Scientific classification
- Kingdom: Animalia
- Phylum: Chordata
- Class: Actinopterygii
- Order: Characiformes
- Family: Ctenoluciidae
- Genus: Boulengerella; C. H. Eigenmann, 1903

Type species
- Xiphostoma lateristriga Boulenger, 1895

Synonyms
- Spixostoma Whitley, 1951; Xiphostoma Agassiz, 1829

= Boulengerella =

Genus of fishes

Boulengerella is a genus of pike-characins from tropical South America, found in the Amazon Basin, Orinoco, and rivers of the Guiana Shield. Boulengerella was named after the Belgian ichthyologist George Albert Boulenger. The currently described species are:

- Boulengerella cuvieri (Spix & Agassiz, 1829) (bicuda)
- Boulengerella lateristriga (Boulenger, 1895) (striped pike-characin)
- Boulengerella lucius (G. Cuvier, 1816) (golden pike-characin)
- Boulengerella maculata (Valenciennes, 1850) (spotted pike-characin)
- Boulengerella xyrekes Vari, 1995
