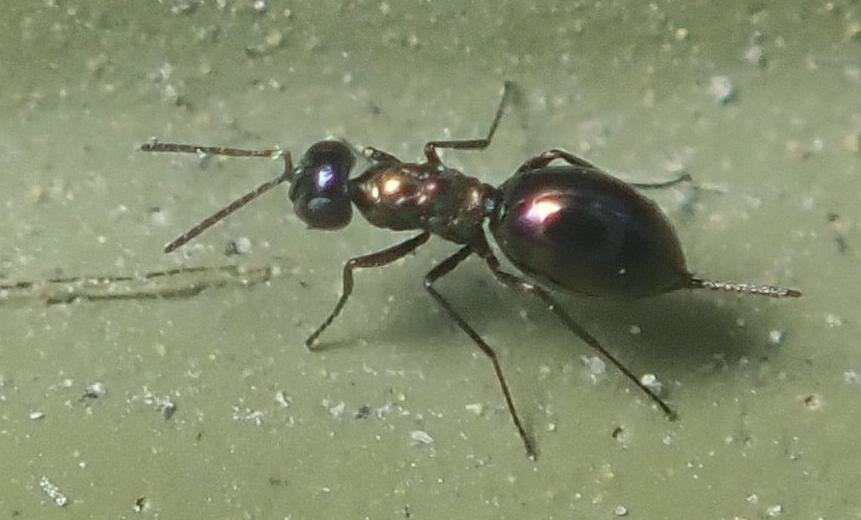
- Female Cea pulicaris

Scientific classification
- Domain: Eukaryota
- Kingdom: Animalia
- Phylum: Arthropoda
- Class: Insecta
- Order: Hymenoptera
- Superfamily: Chalcidoidea
- Family: Ceidae; Bouček, 1961

Type genus
- Cea Walker, 1837

Genera
- Bohpa Darling, 1991; Cea Walker, 1837; Spalangiopelta Masi, 1922

= Ceidae =

Family of wasps

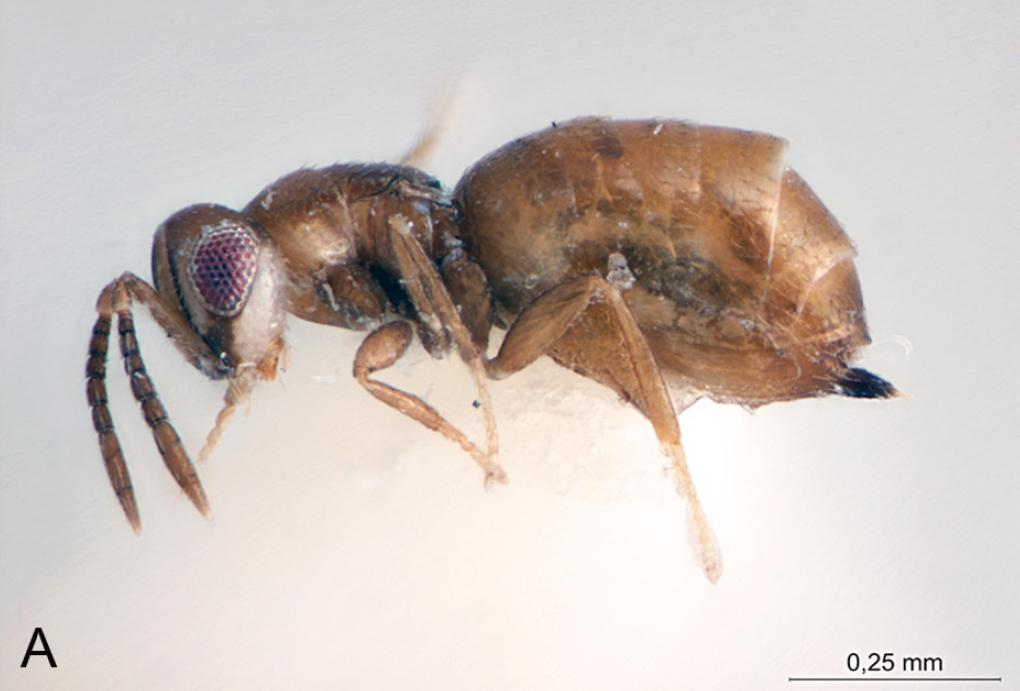
Female Bohpa maculata

Ceidae is a small family of chalcid wasps, previously classified as subfamily Ceinae, in the polyphyletic family Pteromalidae. These wasps are parasitoids of other small insects. Hosts are known only for Cea pulicaris (small Agromyzid flies) and Spalangiopelta alata (small Drosophilid flies).

== Description ==
Its antennae have twelve flagellomeres, and its labrum is subrectangular and exposed.

== Genera and species ==
Bohpa Darling, 1991

- B. maculata Darling, 1991 (South Africa)

Cea Walker, 1837

- C. pulicaris Walker, 1837 (West Palaearctic)

Spalangiopelta Masi, 1922

- S. alata Bouček, 1953 (West Palaearctic),
- S. albigena Darling, 1991 (Nearctic, Neotropical),
- S. alboaculeata Darling, 1995 (West Palaearctic),
- S. apotherisma Darling & Hanson, 1986 (Nearctic),
- S. brachyptera Masi, 1922 (West Palaearctic),
- S. canadensis Darling, 1991 (Nearctic),
- S. ciliata Yoshimoto, 1977 (Nearctic),
- S. dudichi Erdős, 1955 (West Palaearctic),
- S. felonia Darling & Hanson, 1986 (Nearctic),
- S. ferrierei (Hedqvist, 1964) (Neotropical),
- S. hiko Darling, 1995 (East Palaearctic),
- S. laevis Darling, 1991 (Neotropical),
- S. procera Graham, 1966 (West Palaearctic)
- S. rameli Mitroiu, 2016 (West Palaearctic)
- S. viridis Mitroiu, 2016 (Canary Islands)

There is one fossil species: S. georgei Darling, 1997.
