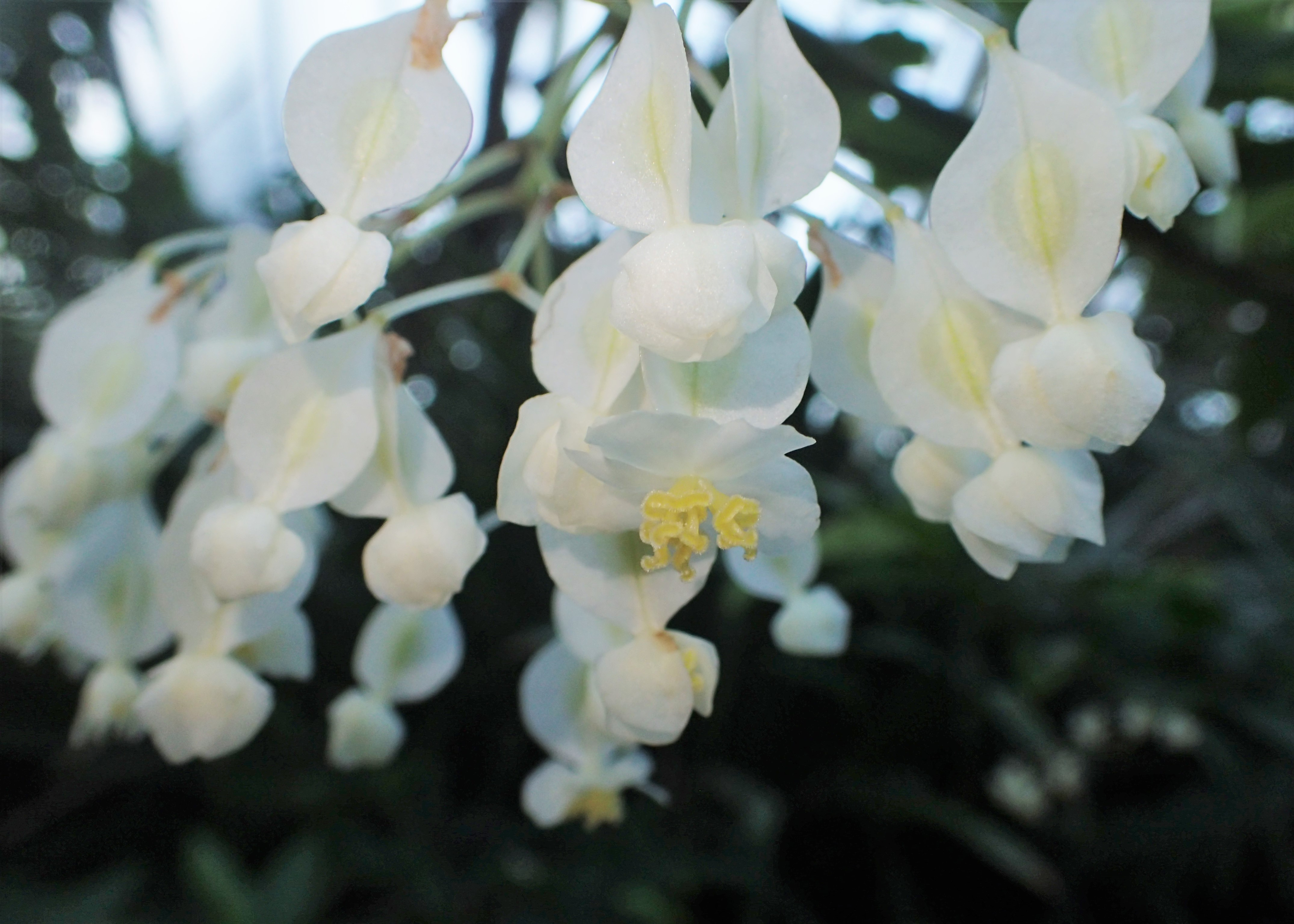
- Flowers
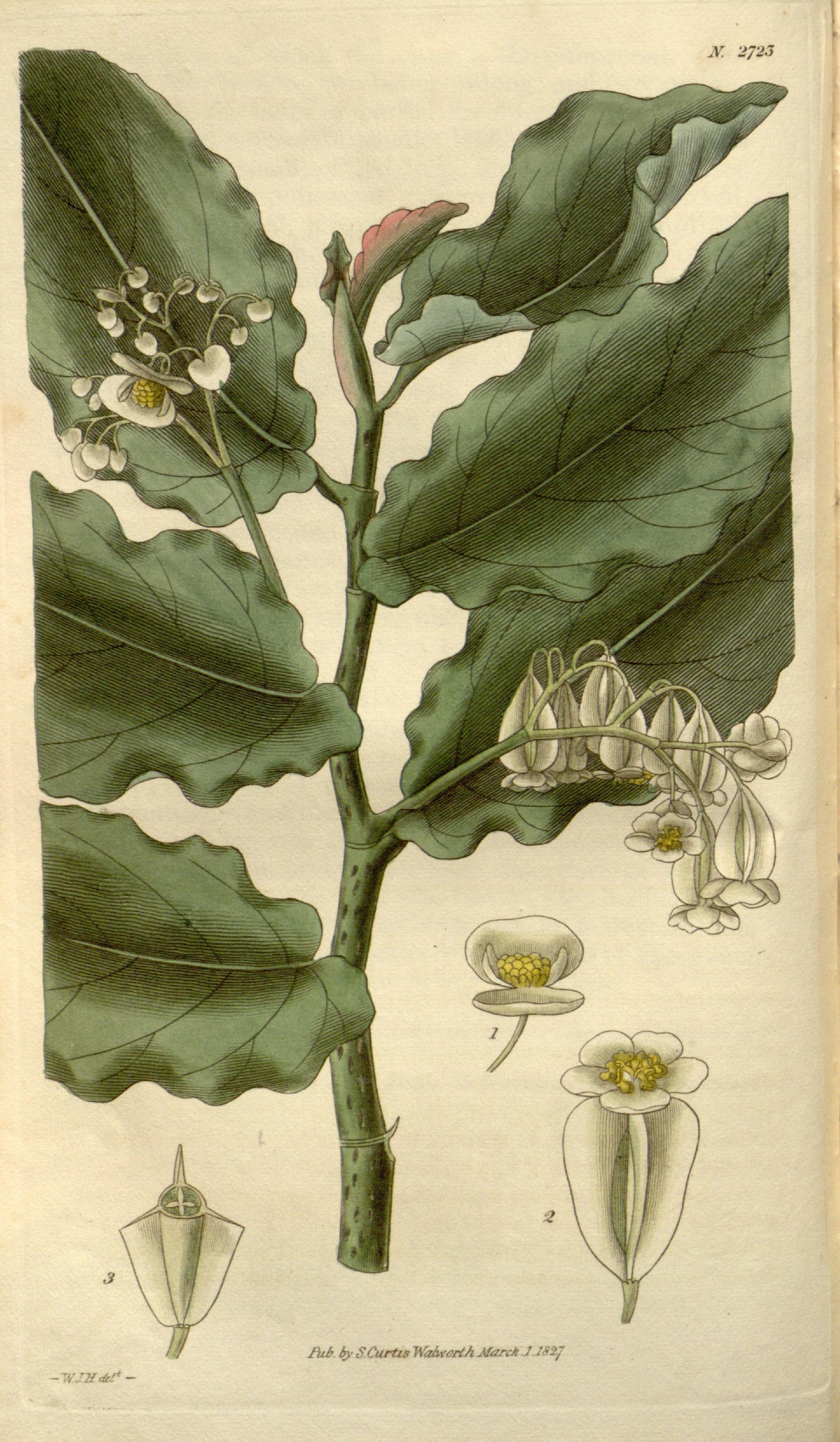
- Botanical illustration

Scientific classification
- Kingdom: Plantae
- Clade: Tracheophytes
- Clade: Angiosperms
- Clade: Eudicots
- Clade: Rosids
- Order: Cucurbitales
- Family: Begoniaceae
- Genus: Begonia
- Species: B. undulata

Binomial name
- Begonia undulata Schott

Synonyms
- Begonia kewensis Gentil; Begonia undulata Otto ex Graham; Gaerdtia stenobotrys Klotzsch; Gaerdtia undulata (Schott) Klotzsch; Trilomisa undulata (Schott) Raf.

= Begonia undulata =

Species of flowering plant

Begonia undulata, the wave leaved begonia, is a species of flowering plant in the family Begoniaceae, native to Rio de Janeiro state of Brazil. One of the more widely cultivated cane begonias, it is typically 1.8 m (6 ft) tall, but can reach 5.5 m (18 ft) if left to its own devices.

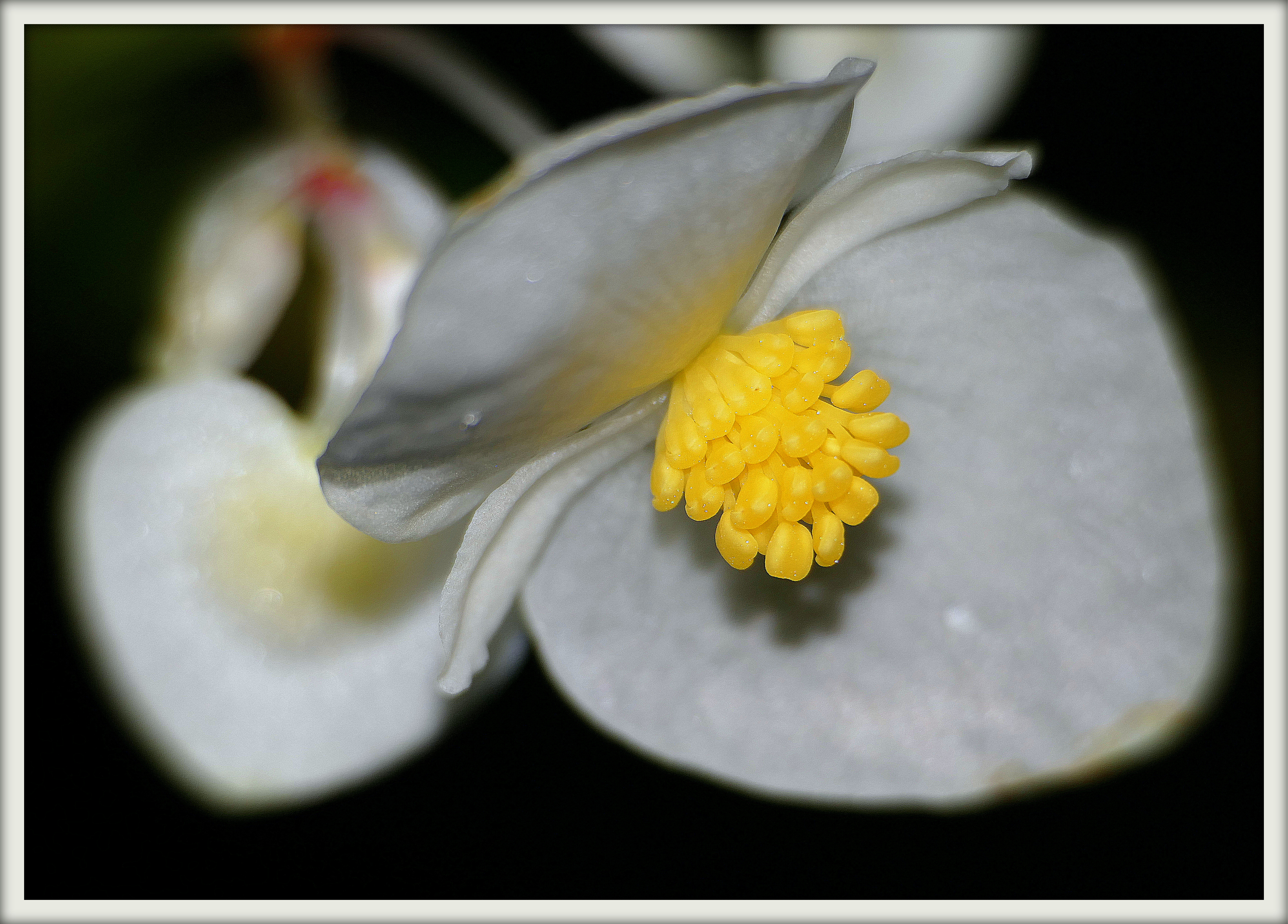
Close-up of flower

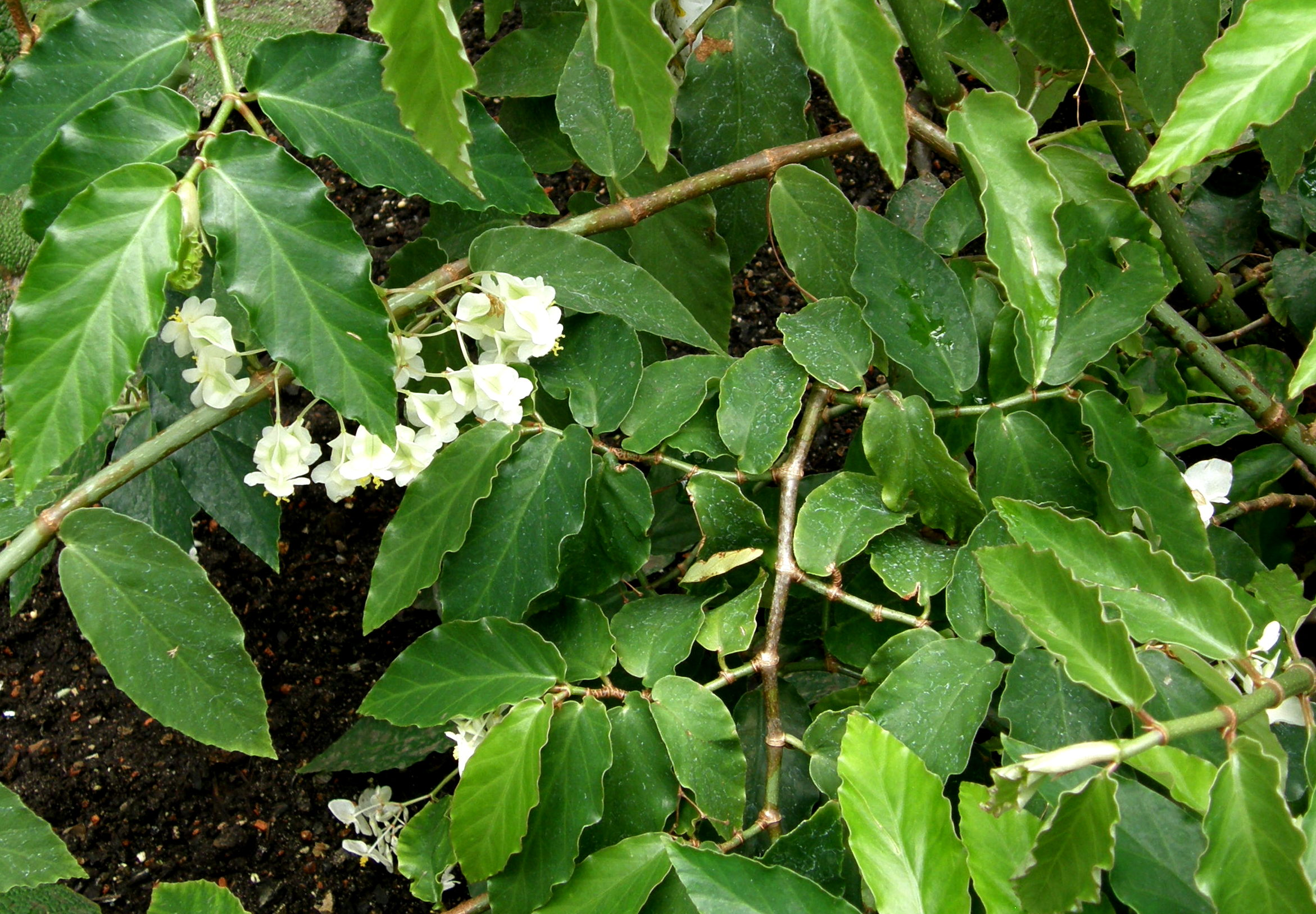
Leaves and canes

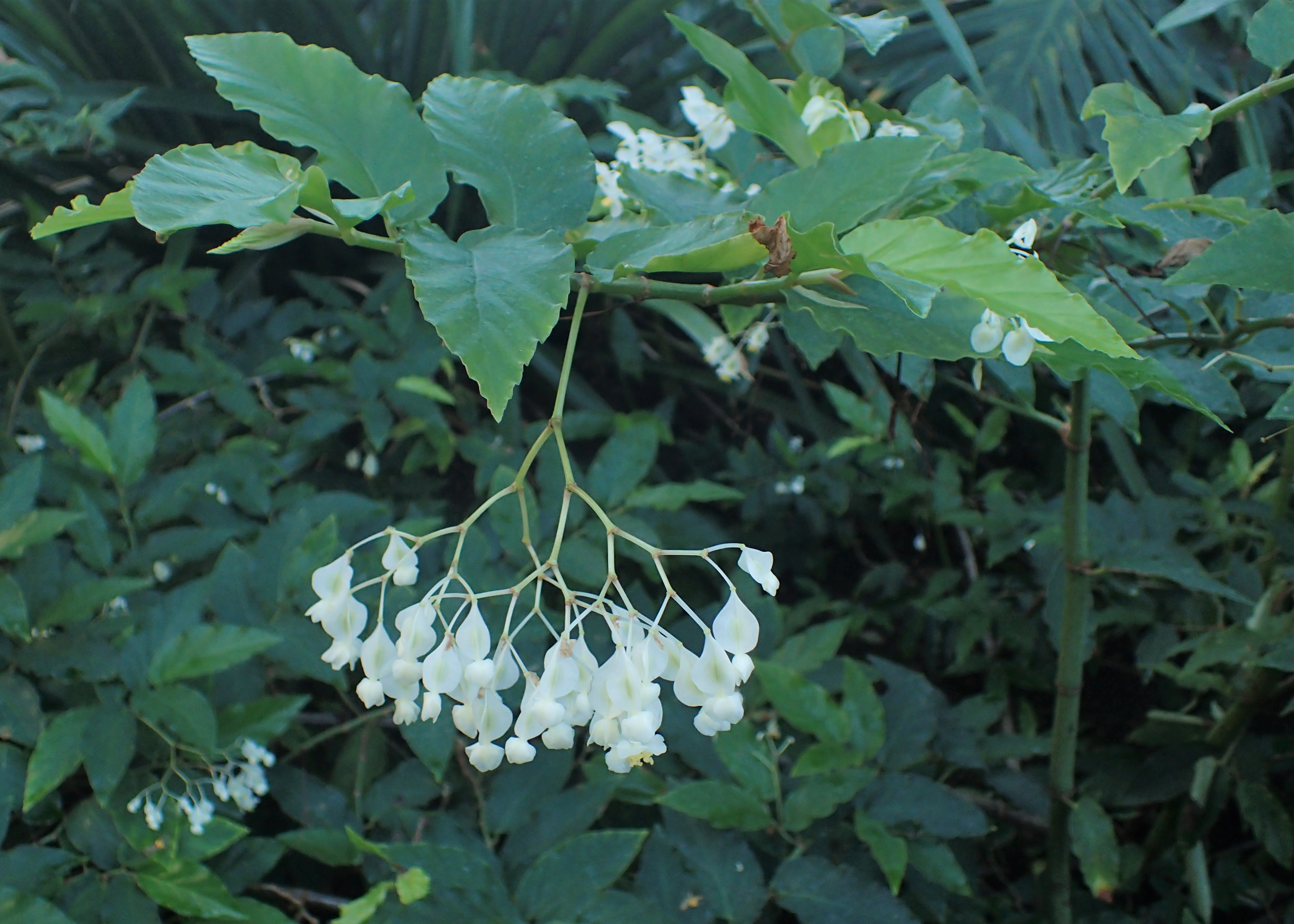
Flowers are pendulous.
