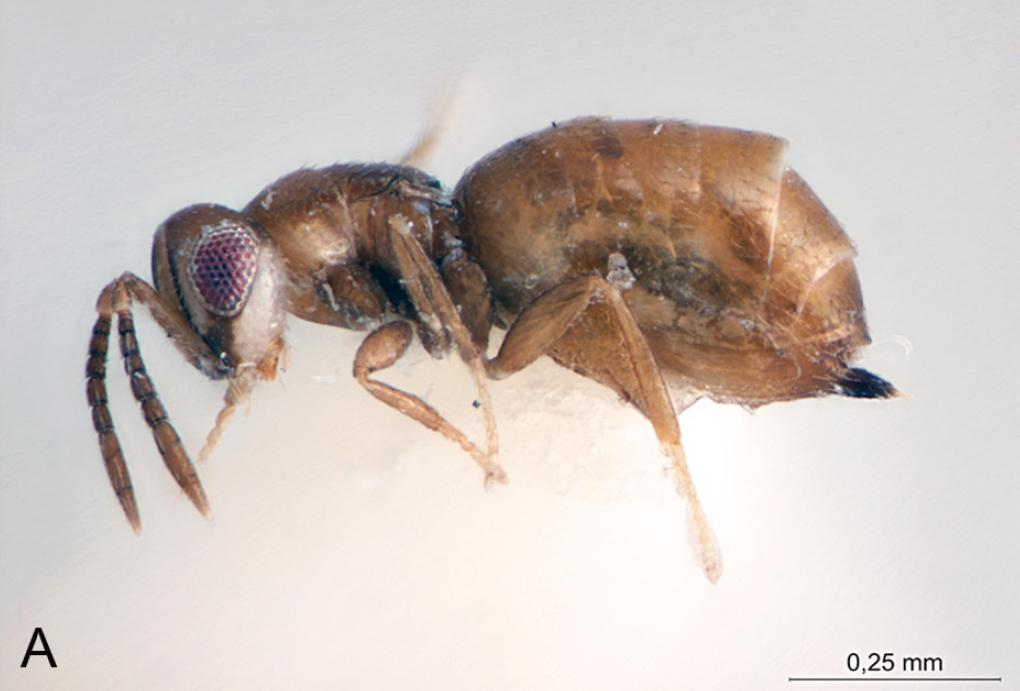
- female

Scientific classification
- Kingdom: Animalia
- Phylum: Arthropoda
- Class: Insecta
- Order: Hymenoptera
- Family: Ceidae
- Genus: Bohpa; Darling, 1991
- Species: B. maculata

Binomial name
- Bohpa maculata Darling, 1991

= Bohpa =

Genus of wasp

Bohpa is a monotypic genus of wasps belonging to the family Ceidae. The only species is Bohpa maculata.
