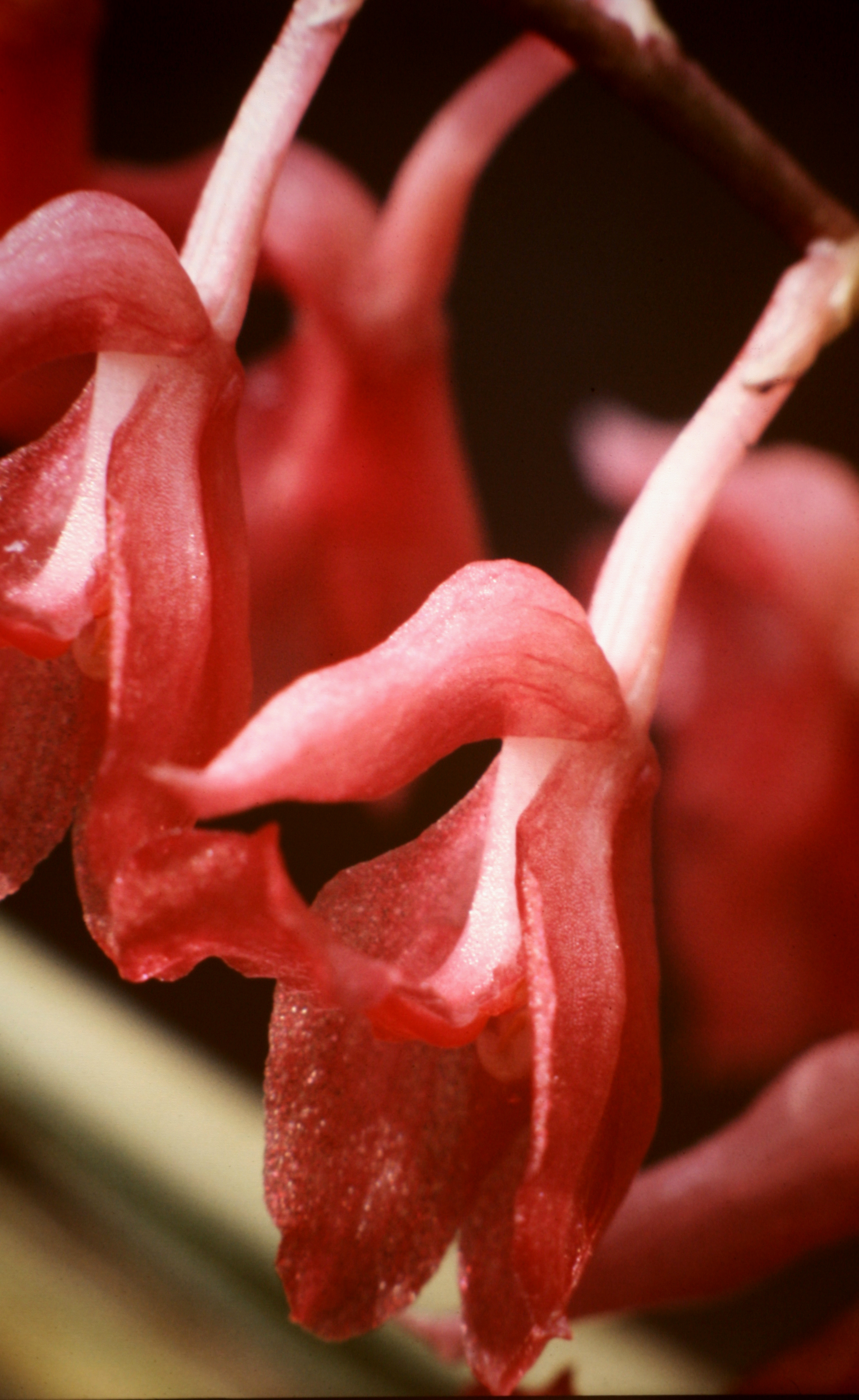
- Rodriguezia lanceolata

Scientific classification
- Kingdom: Plantae
- Clade: Tracheophytes
- Clade: Angiosperms
- Clade: Monocots
- Order: Asparagales
- Family: Orchidaceae
- Subfamily: Epidendroideae
- Tribe: Cymbidieae
- Subtribe: Oncidiinae
- Genus: Rodriguezia; Ruiz & Pav.

Synonyms
- Byurlingtonia Lindl.

= Rodriguezia =

Genus of orchids

Rodriguezia is a genus of orchids. It consists of about 50 species, native to tropical America from southern Mexico and the Windward Islands south to Argentina, with many of the species endemic to Brazil.

== List of species ==
As of December 2025, Plants of the World Online accepts the following 46 species and one hybrid:

- Rodriguezia antioquiana Kraenzl.
- Rodriguezia bahiensis Rchb.f.
- Rodriguezia batemanii Poepp. & Endl.
- Rodriguezia bifolia Barb.Rodr.
- Rodriguezia bockiae D.E.Benn. & Christenson
- Rodriguezia brachystachys Rchb.f. & Warm.
- Rodriguezia bracteata (Vell.) Hoehne
- Rodriguezia bungerothii Rchb.f.
- Rodriguezia candida Bateman ex Lindl.
- Rodriguezia carnea Lindl.
- Rodriguezia chasei Dodson & D.E.Benn.
- Rodriguezia chimorensis Dodson & R.Vásquez
- Rodriguezia cinnabarina H.G.Jones
- Rodriguezia claudiae Chiron
- Rodriguezia compacta Schltr.
- Rodriguezia cuentillensis Kraenzl.
- Rodriguezia decora (Lem.) Rchb.f.
- Rodriguezia delcastilloi D.E.Benn. & Christenson
- Rodriguezia dodsoniana H.Medina
- Rodriguezia dressleriana R.González
- Rodriguezia ensiformis Ruiz & Pav.
- Rodriguezia fernandezii Dodson & D.E.Benn.
- Rodriguezia granadensis (Lindl.) Rchb.f.
- Rodriguezia huebneri Schltr.
- Rodriguezia joesiana Campacci & J.B.F.Silva
- Rodriguezia × kayasimae V.T.Rodrigues & Vinhos
- Rodriguezia lanceolata Ruiz & Pav.
- Rodriguezia leeana Rchb.f.
- Rodriguezia lehmannii Rchb.f.
- Rodriguezia leucantha Barb.Rodr.
- Rodriguezia limae Brade
- Rodriguezia luteola N.E.Br.
- Rodriguezia negrensis (Barb.Rodr.) Cogn.
- Rodriguezia obtusifolia (Lindl.) Rchb.f.
- Rodriguezia pardina Rchb.f.
- Rodriguezia pubescens (Lindl.) Rchb.f.
- Rodriguezia pulcherrima Bogarín, Pupulin & H.Medina
- Rodriguezia pulchra Løjtnant
- Rodriguezia refracta (Lindl.) Rchb.f.
- Rodriguezia ricii R.Vásquez & Dodson
- Rodriguezia rigida (Lindl.) Rchb.f.
- Rodriguezia satipoana Dodson & D.E.Benn.
- Rodriguezia sticta M.W.Chase
- Rodriguezia strobelii Garay
- Rodriguezia suarezii Kolan. & Medina Tr.
- Rodriguezia sucrei Braga
- Rodriguezia vasquezii Dodson
