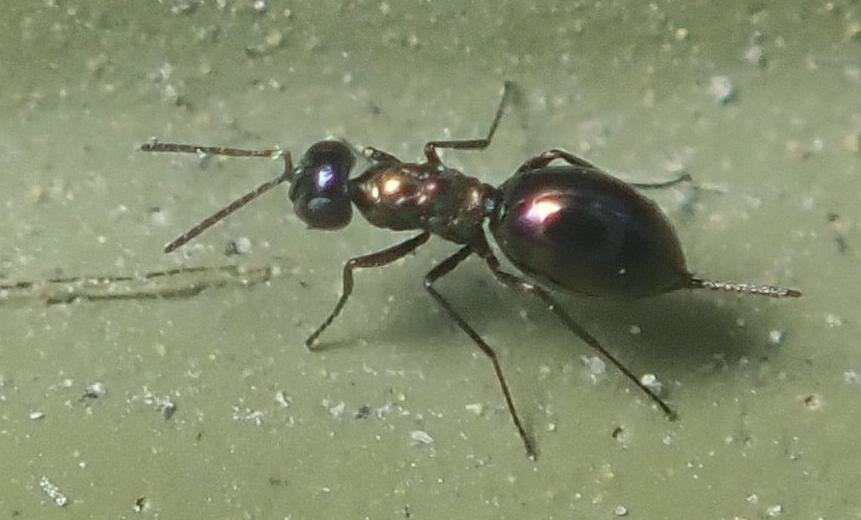
- female

Scientific classification
- Kingdom: Animalia
- Phylum: Arthropoda
- Class: Insecta
- Order: Hymenoptera
- Family: Ceidae
- Genus: Cea; Walker, 1837
- Species: C. pulicaris

Binomial name
- Cea pulicaris Walker, 1837

Synonyms
- Cea irene Walker, 1851

= Cea pulicaris =

Species of wasp

Cea is a monotypic genus of wasps belonging to the family Ceidae. The only species is Cea pulicaris.
