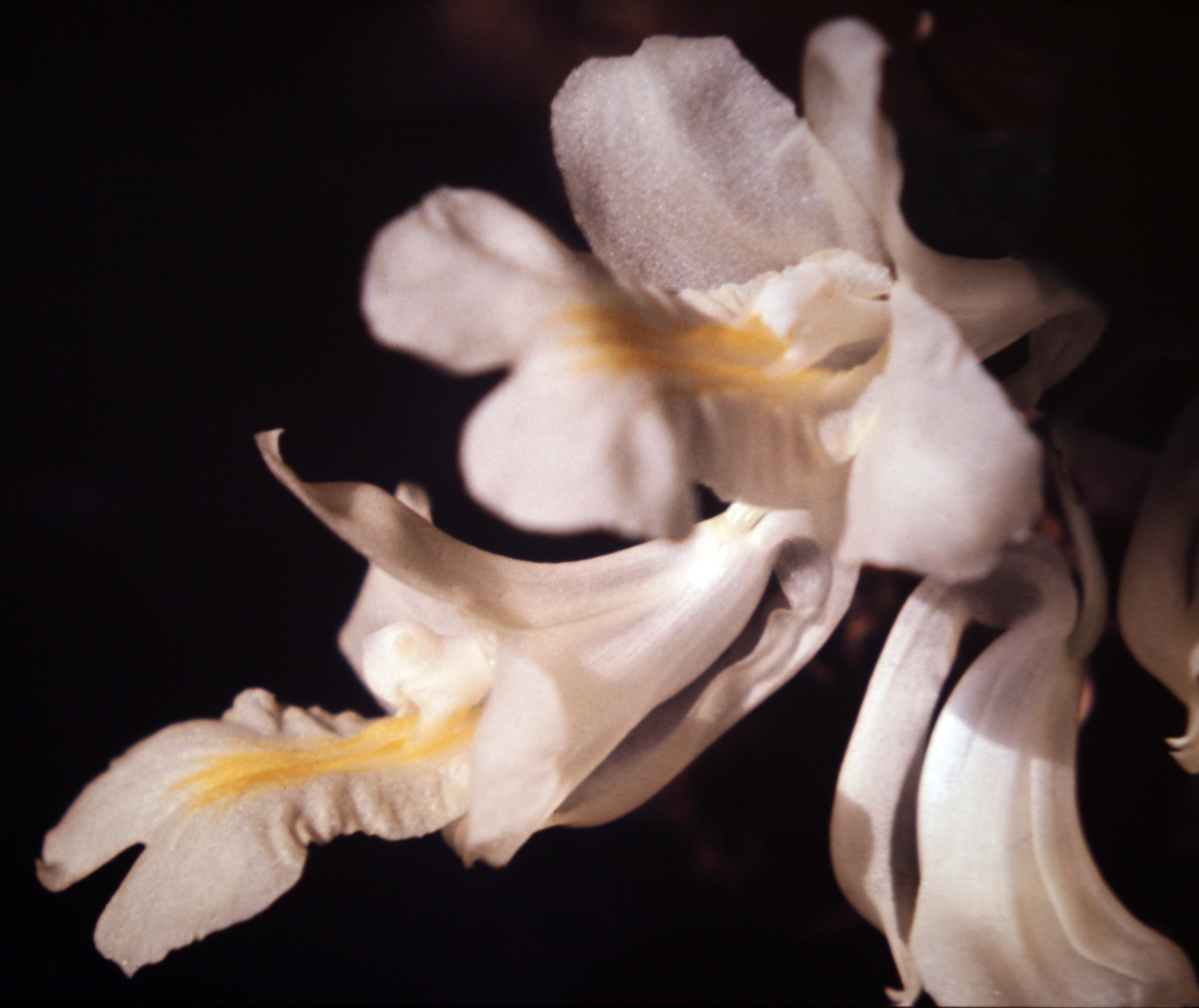
- Flower of Rodriguezia candida

Scientific classification
- Kingdom: Plantae
- Clade: Embryophytes
- Clade: Tracheophytes
- Clade: Spermatophytes
- Clade: Angiosperms
- Clade: Monocots
- Order: Asparagales
- Family: Orchidaceae
- Subfamily: Epidendroideae
- Genus: Rodriguezia
- Species: R. candida

Binomial name
- Rodriguezia candida (Lindl.) Hoehne

Synonyms
- Burlingtonia candida Lindl.; Burlingtonia farmeri B.S.Williams

= Rodriguezia candida =

Species of orchid

Rodriguezia candida is a species of orchid native to Venezuela, Brazil, French Guiana, Suriname.
