= Barygenys maculata =

Conservation status
- Least Concern (IUCN 3.1)

Scientific classification
- Kingdom: Animalia
- Phylum: Chordata
- Class: Amphibia
- Order: Anura
- Family: Microhylidae
- Genus: Barygenys
- Species: B. maculata

Binomial name
- Barygenys maculata Menzies & Tyler, 1977

Species of frog

Barygenys maculata is a species of frog in the family Microhylidae. It is endemic to Papua New Guinea. Its natural habitat is subtropical or tropical moist montane forests. It is threatened by habitat loss.
