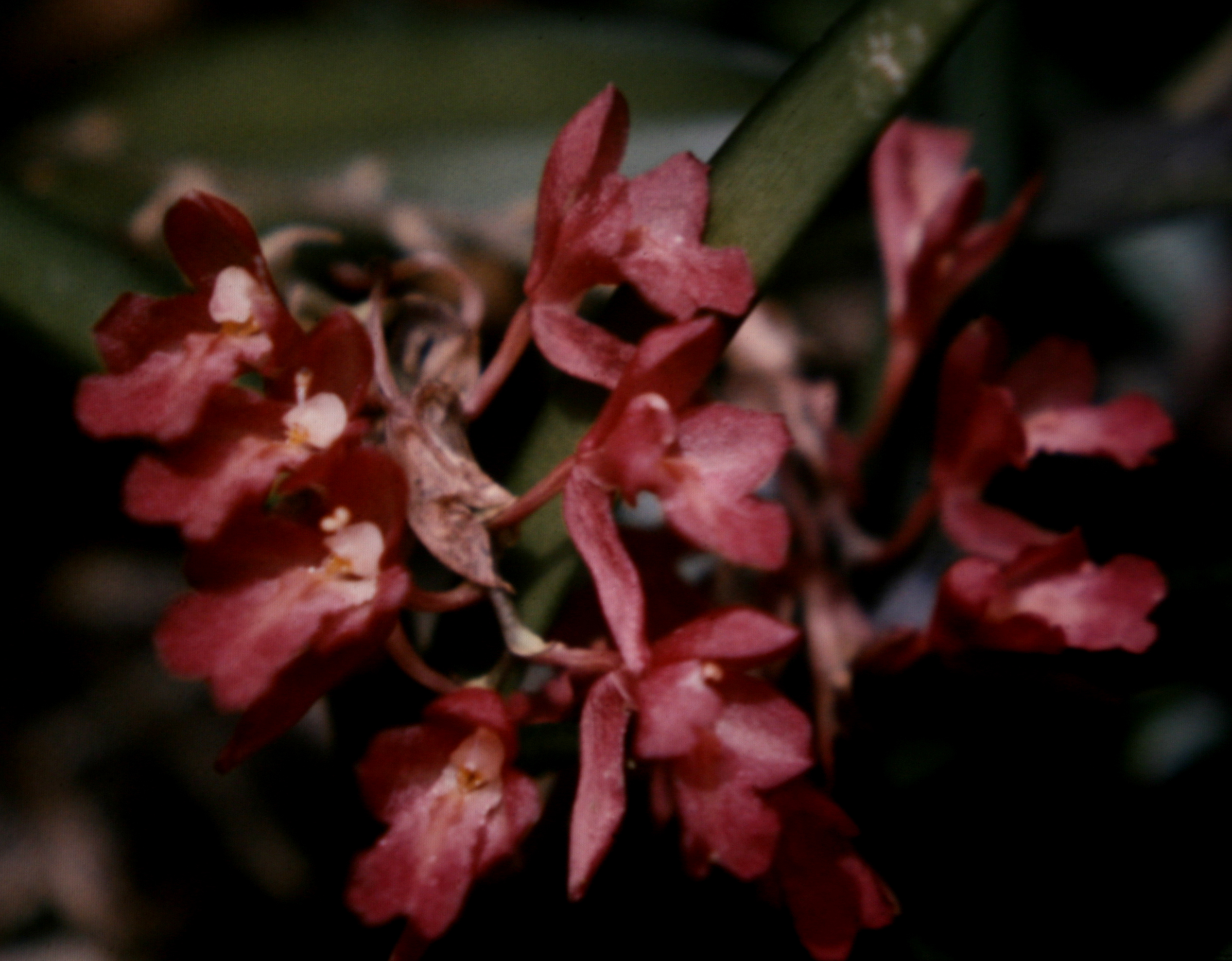
- Flower of Rodriguezia lanceolata

Scientific classification
- Kingdom: Plantae
- Clade: Tracheophytes
- Clade: Angiosperms
- Clade: Monocots
- Order: Asparagales
- Family: Orchidaceae
- Subfamily: Epidendroideae
- Genus: Rodriguezia
- Species: R. lanceolata

Binomial name
- Rodriguezia lanceolata Ruiz & Pav.

Synonyms
- Rodriguezia secunda Kunth; Pleurothallis coccinea Hook.; Burlingtonia rosea Rand; Rodriguezia secunda var. panamensis Schltr.

= Rodriguezia lanceolata =

Species of orchid

Rodriguezia lanceolata is a species of orchid in the family Orchidaceae. It is found in St. Vincent, Trinidad, Panama, Colombia, Venezuela, the Guianas, Suriname, Peru, Ecuador, and Brazil.
