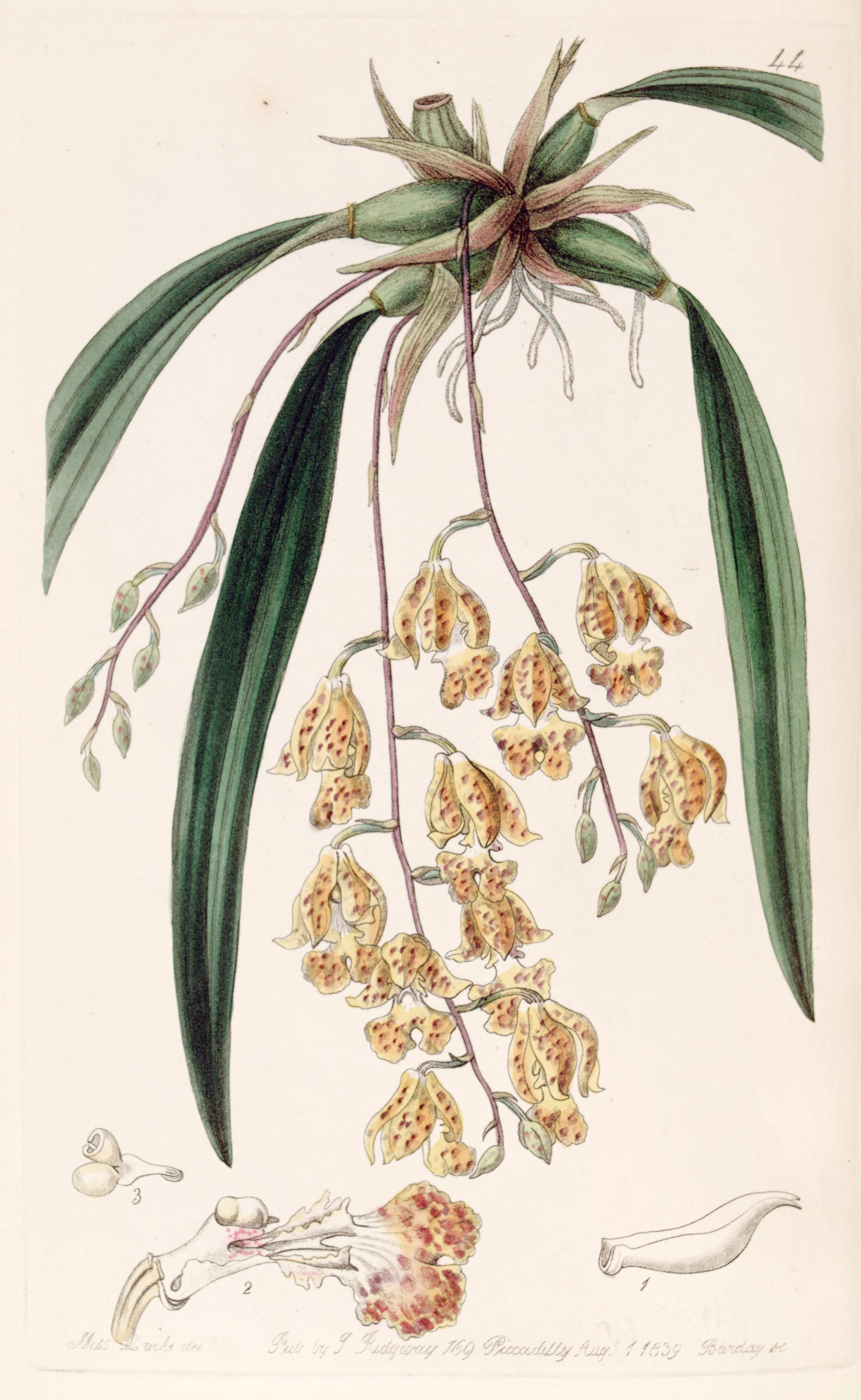
- 1839 illustration

Scientific classification
- Kingdom: Plantae
- Clade: Tracheophytes
- Clade: Angiosperms
- Clade: Monocots
- Order: Asparagales
- Family: Orchidaceae
- Subfamily: Epidendroideae
- Genus: Rodriguezia
- Species: R. sticta

Binomial name
- Rodriguezia sticta M.W.Chase

Synonyms
- Burlingtonia maculata Lindl. (basionym); Rodriguezia maculata (Lindl.) Rchb.f., illeg; Rodriguezia maculata var. bicristata Barb.Rodr.; Rodriguezia maculata var. sexcristata Barb.Rodr.; Rodriguezia maculata var. longifolia Loefgr.; Rodriguezia tedescoi Chiron & V.P.Castro; Rodriguezia tedescoi f. albiglossa Chiron & V.P.Castro

= Rodriguezia sticta =

Species of orchid

Rodriguezia sticta is a species of orchid endemic to Brazil (Espírito Santo, Minas Gerais, Rio de Janeiro).
