= Cyperus pulicaris =

Scientific classification
- Kingdom: Plantae
- Clade: Tracheophytes
- Clade: Angiosperms
- Clade: Monocots
- Clade: Commelinids
- Order: Poales
- Family: Cyperaceae
- Genus: Cyperus
- Species: C. pulicaris

Binomial name
- Cyperus pulicaris Kük.

Species of plant endemic to Haiti

Cyperus pulicaris is a species of sedge that is endemic to Haiti.

The species was first formally described by the botanist Georg Kükenthal in 1926.

== See also ==
- List of Cyperus species
