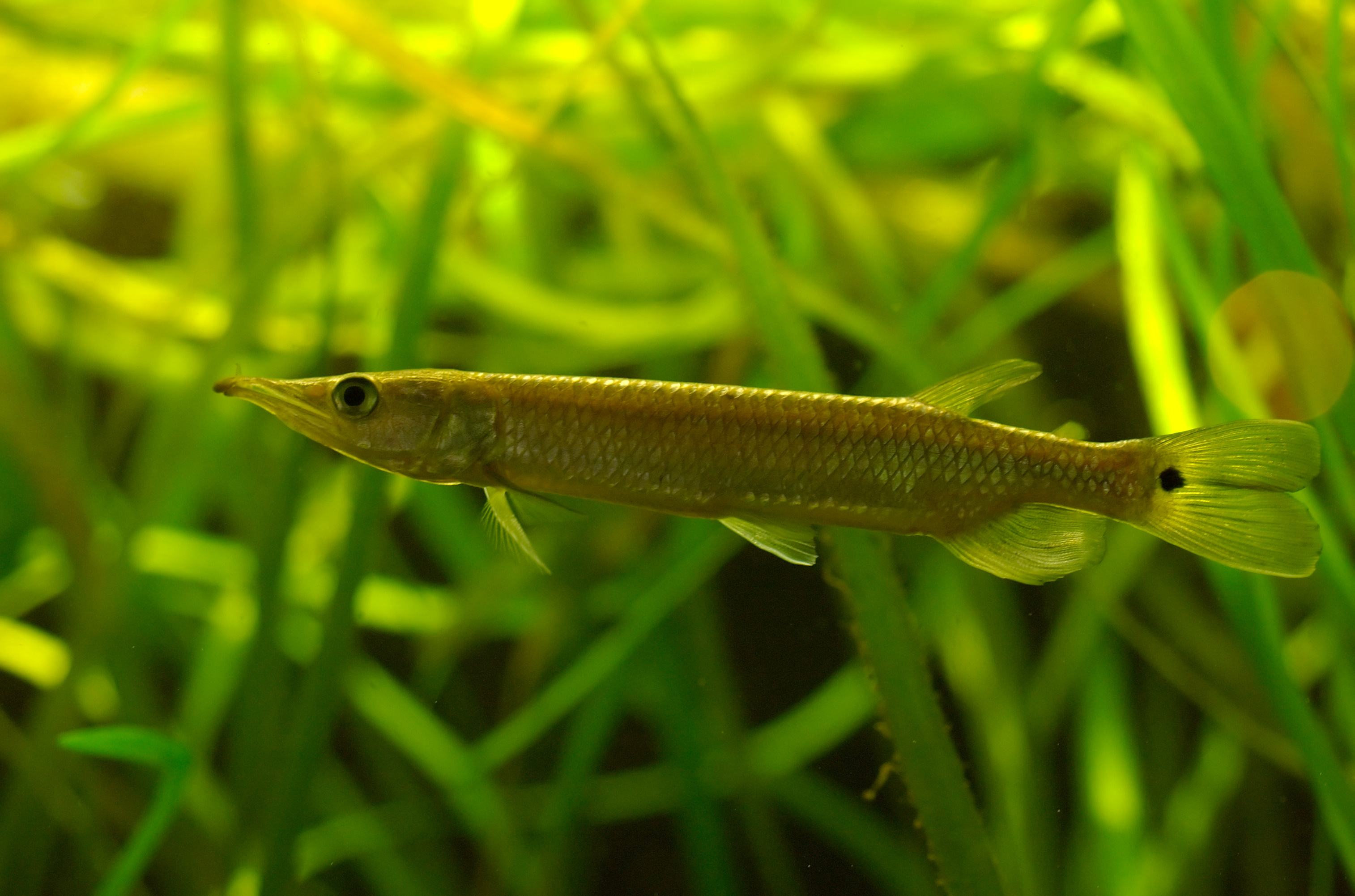
- Ctenolucius hujeta

Scientific classification
- Kingdom: Animalia
- Phylum: Chordata
- Class: Actinopterygii
- Order: Characiformes
- Suborder: Characoidei
- Family: Ctenoluciidae; Schultz, 1944

Genera
- See text

= Ctenoluciidae =

Family of fishes

Ctenoluciidae the pike-characins, is a small family of freshwater ray-finned fishes belonging to the order Characiformes, the characin-like fishes. The fishes in this genus are found in Panama and South America.

The name of the family is derived from its type genus, Ctenolucius, and combines cteno, from the Greek ktenós meaning "comb", and the Latin lucius, which means "pike".

They have elongated, pike-like bodies, and several sharp and conical teeth. They are relatively large, up to 1 m (3.3 ft) in length, predatory fish.

Some of these fish, such as Ctenolucius hujeta, enter the aquarium fish hobby, often being labeled a "freshwater barracuda" or "freshwater needlefish", descriptions of fish that are both unrelated to members of this family.

== Genera ==
The two genera in this group are:

- Boulengerella C. H. Eigenmann, 1903 (five species)
- Ctenolucius Gill, 1861 (two species)
