= Mbaramo =

Ward in Muheza District, Tanga Region

Mbaramo Kata ya Mbaramo (Swahili)
- Ward of Muheza District
- From top to bottom
- Interactive map of Mbaramo
- Coordinates: 5°10′12.72″S 38°46′59.52″E
- Country: Tanzania
- Region: Tanga Region
- District: Muheza District

Area
  - Total: 0.9 km^{2} (0.35 sq mi)

Population (2012)
  - Total: 2,795

Ethnic groups
  - Settler: Swahili
  - Ancestral: Bondei
- Tanzanian Postal Code: 21405

Mbaramo (Kata ya Mbaramo, in Swahili) is an administrative ward in Muheza District of Tanga Region in Tanzania. The ward is part of the Muheza urban area. Magila forms the northern and western boundaries of the ward. The Tanganyika ward is to the east. Masuguru and Kwemkabala are to the south. The ward covers an area of 0.9 km^{2} (0.35 sq mi), According to the 2012 census, the ward has a total population of 2,795.

== Administration ==
The postal code for Mbaramo Ward is 21405. The ward is divided into the following neighborhoods (Mitaa):

- Jembe
- Kisiwani
- Madaba
- Mafleta
- Mbaramo
- Mkwakwa

- Mkwakwa Mafleta
- Msangazi
- Sega
- Ubwari

=== Government ===
The ward, like every other ward in the country, has local government offices based on the population served.The Mbaramo Ward administration building houses a court as per the Ward Tribunal Act of 1988, including other vital departments for the administration the ward. The ward has the following administration offices:

- Mbaramo Police Station
- Mbaramo Government Office (Afisa Mtendaji)
- Mbaramo Tribunal (Baraza La Kata) is a Department inside Ward Government Office

In the local government system of Tanzania, the ward is the smallest democratic unit. Each ward is composed of a committee of eight elected council members which include a chairperson, one salaried officer (with no voting rights), and an executive officer. One-third of seats are reserved for women councillors.

== Demographics ==
Like much of the district, the ward is the ancestral home of the Bondei people.

== Education and health ==
=== Education ===
The ward is home to these educational institutions:

- Mbaramo Primary School
- Mang'enya Primary School
- Mbaramo Secondary School
- Muheza Muslim Secondary School

=== Healthcare ===
The ward is home to the following health institutions:

- Ubwari Health Center
