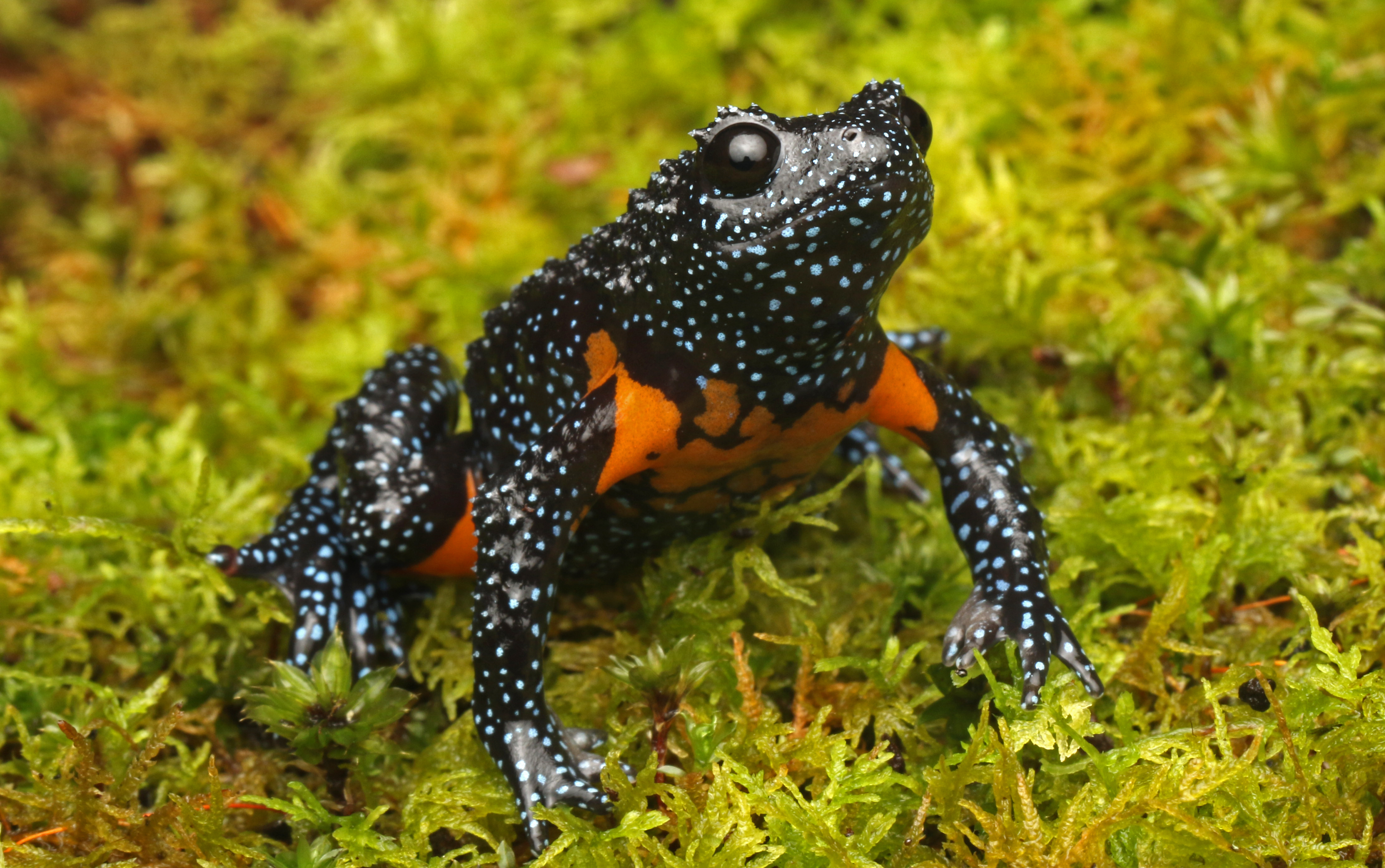

Conservation status
- Vulnerable (IUCN 3.1)

Scientific classification
- Kingdom: Animalia
- Phylum: Chordata
- Class: Amphibia
- Order: Anura
- Family: Microhylidae
- Subfamily: Melanobatrachinae; Noble, 1931
- Genus: Melanobatrachus; Beddome, 1878
- Species: M. indicus

Binomial name
- Melanobatrachus indicus Beddome, 1878

= Melanobatrachus =

Species of amphibian

Melanobatrachus is a genus of narrow-mouthed frogs in the family Microhylidae. It is the only remaining genus in the monotypic subfamily Melanobatrachinae. It contains a single species, Melanobatrachus indicus, also known as the Indian black microhylid frog and Malabar black narrow-mouthed frog. It is endemic to wet evergreen forests of southern Western Ghats in Kerala and Tamil Nadu states of India. It has been recorded from Anaimalai, Munnar, Palni hills, Periyar Tiger Reserve and Kalakkad Mundanthurai Tiger Reserve

Melanobatrachus indicus is a rare species that was only rediscovered in 1997. It lives amongst leaf-litter, rocks and other ground cover of moist evergreen tropical forests.

The subfamily Melanobatrachinae included two African genera, Hoplophryne Barbour & Loveridge, 1928 and Parhoplophryne Barbour & Loveridge, 1928, in the past but they are now placed in the subfamily Hoplophryninae.

Melanobatrachus indicus is an Evolutionarily Distinct and Globally Endangered (EDGE) species. It is classified as Vulnerable by the International Union for Conservation of Nature. The species faces danger by photography trips.
