= Genge, Muheza =

Ward in Muheza District, Tanga Region

Genge Kata ya Genge (Swahili)
- Ward of Muheza District
- From top to bottom
- Interactive map of Genge
- Coordinates: 5°10′49.08″S 38°48′11.88″E
- Country: Tanzania
- Region: Tanga Region
- District: Muheza District

Area
  - Total: 5.4 km^{2} (2.1 sq mi)

Population (2012)
  - Total: 6,521

Ethnic groups
  - Settler: Swahili
  - Ancestral: Bondei
- Tanzanian Postal Code: 21402

Genge (Kata ya Genge, in Swahili) is an administrative ward in Muheza District of Tanga Region in Tanzania. The ward is part of the Muheza urban area. Tanganyika forms the northern boundary of the ward. East of this area is Lusanga. Kilulu is to the south. Majengo ward is located to the west. The ward covers an area of 5.4 km^{2} (2.1 sq mi). According to the 2012 census, the ward has a total population of 6,521.

== Administration ==
The postal code for Genge Ward is 21402. The ward is divided into the following neighborhoods (Mitaa):

- Genge
- Genge Mpya
- Genge Mzee
- Michungwani
- National Housing

=== Government ===
The ward, like every other ward in the country, has local government offices based on the population served.The Genge Ward administration building houses a court as per the Ward Tribunal Act of 1988, including other vital departments for the administration the ward. The ward has the following administration offices:

- Genge Police Station
- Genge Government Office (Afisa Mtendaji)
- Genge Tribunal (Baraza La Kata) is a Department inside Ward Government Office

In the local government system of Tanzania, the ward is the smallest democratic unit. Each ward is composed of a committee of eight elected council members which include a chairperson, one salaried officer (with no voting rights), and an executive officer. One-third of seats are reserved for women councillors.

== Demographics ==
Like much of the district, the ward is the ancestral home of the Bondei people.

== Education and health ==
=== Education ===
The ward is home to these educational institutions:

- Kilulu Primary School
- Chogowe Primary School
- Chief Mangenya Secondary School

=== Healthcare ===
The ward is home to the following health institutions:

- Genge Health Center
