= Kwemkabala =

Ward in Muheza District, Tanga Region

Kwemkabala Kata ya Kwemkabala (Swahili)
- Ward of Muheza District
- From top to bottom
- Interactive map of Kwemkabala
- Coordinates: 5°10′54.48″S 38°47′0.24″E
- Country: Tanzania
- Region: Tanga Region
- District: Muheza District

Area
  - Total: 3.2 km^{2} (1.2 sq mi)

Population (2012)
  - Total: 6,672

Ethnic groups
  - Settler: Swahili
  - Ancestral: Bondei
- Tanzanian Postal Code: 21404

Kwemkabala (Kata ya Kwemkabala, in Swahili) is an administrative ward in Muheza District of Tanga Region in Tanzania. The ward is part of the Muheza urban area. North of the ward, Mbaramo, Masuguru, and Magila form its borders. East of here is Majengo. Kilulu is to the south. Tingeni is in the west. The ward covers an area of 3.2 km^{2} (1.2 sq mi), According to the 2012 census, the ward has a total population of 6,672.

== Administration ==
The postal code for Kwemkabala Ward is 21404. The ward is divided into the following neighborhoods (Mitaa):

- Masimbani
- Masuguru Kijijini
- Mkwajuni

- Ngwaru Kanisani
- Ngwaru Kijini

=== Government ===
The ward, like every other ward in the country, has local government offices based on the population served.The Kwemkabala Ward administration building houses a court as per the Ward Tribunal Act of 1988, including other vital departments for the administration the ward. The ward has the following administration offices:

- Kwemkabala Police Station
- Kwemkabala Government Office (Afisa Mtendaji)
- Kwemkabala Tribunal (Baraza La Kata) is a Department inside Ward Government Office

In the local government system of Tanzania, the ward is the smallest democratic unit. Each ward is composed of a committee of eight elected council members which include a chairperson, one salaried officer (with no voting rights), and an executive officer. One-third of seats are reserved for women councillors.

== Demographics ==
Like much of the district, the ward is the ancestral home of the Bondei people.

== Education and health ==
=== Education ===
The ward is home to these educational institutions:

- Kwemkabala Primary School
- Mar-wash Islamic Primary School
- Kwemkabala Secondary School

=== Healthcare ===
The ward is home to the following health institutions:

- Kwemkabala Health Center
