= Masuguru =

Ward in Muheza District, Tanga Region

Masuguru Kata ya Masuguru (Swahili)
- Ward of Muheza District
- From top to bottom
- Interactive map of Masuguru
- Coordinates: 5°10′33.6″S 38°47′11.04″E
- Country: Tanzania
- Region: Tanga Region
- District: Muheza District

Area
  - Total: 0.3 km^{2} (0.12 sq mi)

Population (2012)
  - Total: 3,824

Ethnic groups
  - Settler: Swahili
  - Ancestral: Bondei
- Tanzanian Postal Code: 21403

Masuguru (Kata ya Masuguru, in Swahili) is an administrative ward in Tanga District of Tanga Region in Tanzania. The ward is part of the Muheza urban area. Tanganyika and Mbaramo form the northern and southern borders of the ward. East of this location is Majengo. Kwemkabala ward encircles the ward to the south and west. The ward covers an area of 0.3 km^{2} (0.12 sq mi), and has an average elevation of 200 m (660 ft). According to the 2012 census, the ward has a total population of 3,824.

== Administration ==
The postal code for Masuguru Ward is 21403. The ward is divided into the following neighborhoods (Mitaa):

- Bonde Street
- Masuguru
- Masuguru Shule
- Papa Street

- Swahili Street
- Ubena "A"
- Uhuru
- Uhuru Street

=== Government ===
The ward, like every other ward in the country, has local government offices based on the population served.The Masuguru Ward administration building houses a court as per the Ward Tribunal Act of 1988, including other vital departments for the administration the ward. The ward has the following administration offices:

- Masuguru Police Station
- Masuguru Government Office (Afisa Mtendaji)
- Masuguru Tribunal (Baraza La Kata) is a Department inside Ward Government Office

In the local government system of Tanzania, the ward is the smallest democratic unit. Each ward is composed of a committee of eight elected council members which include a chairperson, one salaried officer (with no voting rights), and an executive officer. One-third of seats are reserved for women councillors.

== Demographics ==
Like much of the district, the ward is the ancestral home of the Bondei people.

== Education and health ==
=== Education ===
The ward is home to these educational institutions:

- Masuguru Primary School
- Swafaa Primary School
- Muheza Primary School

=== Healthcare ===
The ward is home to the following health institutions:

- Medicare Health Center
