= Alloschizotaenia minuta =

Scientific classification
- Kingdom: Animalia
- Phylum: Arthropoda
- Subphylum: Myriapoda
- Class: Chilopoda
- Order: Geophilomorpha
- Family: Geophilidae
- Genus: Alloschizotaenia
- Species: A. minuta

Binomial name
- Alloschizotaenia minuta (Silvestri, 1907)

Synonyms
- Schizotaenia minuta Silvestri, 1907; Schizotaenia pluvia Attems, 1909

Species of centipede

Alloschizotaenia minuta is a species of soil centipede in the family Geophilidae. This centipede can reach 18 mm in length and features 37 to 41 pairs of legs. This species is found in Tanzania and Kenya.

== Discovery, taxonomy, and distribution ==
This species was first described under the name Schizotaenia minuta by the Italian zoologist Filippo Silvestri in 1907. Silvestri described of this species based on a small male specimen measuring only 9 mm in length. This specimen was found under 10 cm to 20 cm of soil in Amani, in the Muheza district in the Usumbara highland, in what is now Tanzania. This holotype is deposited in the Zoological Museum in Hamburg. In 1909, the French myriapodologist Henri W. Brölemann introduced the genus Alloschizotaenia to contain this centipede as the type species Alloschizotaenia minuta, which authorities now accept as the valid name for this species.

In 1909, the Austrian myriapodologist Carl Attems described Schizotaenia pluvia as a new species based on specimens including both sexes. These specimens were collected by the Swedish naturalist Yngve Sjöstedt from a rainforest at an elevation of 1,500 meters on Mount Meru in 1905 and 1906 in what is now Tanzania. One syntype of each sex and other type material in the form of slides are deposited in the Natural History Museum in Vienna; another male syntype is stored at the Natural History Museum in Berlin.

In 1914, the French zoologist Henri Ribaut deemed Schizotaenia pluvia to be a junior synonym of Alloschizotaenia minuta, and authorities now consider these centipedes to be the same species. Ribaut studied numerous A. minuta specimens of different ages and concluded that Silvestri's small specimen was young and that the slight differences between the descriptions provided by Silvestri and Attems flow from intraspecific variation among specimens of different ages. The specimens studied by Ribaut included both sexes and were collected in 1912 by the French zoologists Charles A. Alluabud and René Jeannel, who found these specimens at several different sites at elevations ranging from 300 meters to 3,100 meters, including the Kikuyu escarpment near the town of Kijabé as well as the alpine meadows of Mount Kinangop in the Aberdare Range, both locations in Kenya, and the alpine meadows near Moshi on the slopes of Mount Kilimanjaro in what is now Tanzania.

== Description ==
This centipede features a yellow body, but the head is a pale chestnut brown. Males of this species can feature 37, 39, or 41 pairs of legs, whereas females can feature 39 or 41 leg pairs. This species can reach 18 mm in length. The head is about 1.5 times longer than wide. The clypeus features four setae in a round patch in the middle, near the anterior margin, followed by a transverse row of four more setae. The middle of the labrum features from four to eight stout denticles.

The coxosternite of the first maxillae is not divided. The coxosternite of the second maxillae is almost completely divided down the middle but remains connected at the front by a narrow bridge. The anterior margin of the forcipular sternite features two pointed teeth. The first article of the forcipule features a large pointed tooth at the distal end, and the ultimate article of the forcipule features a large pointed basal tooth and a claw that is long, slender, and curved, with a smooth inner surface.

The main tergite of each leg-bearing segment features two transverse rows of setae, whereas the pretergite (sclerite in front of the main tergite) features only one. The sternites lack fields of pores but each features several (usually four) transverse rows of setae. The sternite of the last leg-bearing segment is broader across the anterior margin and markedly narrower at the rear with rounded posterior corners.

The basal element of each of the ultimate legs (coxopleuron) features from two to four large pores, depending on the age of the specimen. The ultimate legs of males are swollen and features segments with dense short hair on the ventral surface, whereas those of females bear only sparse bristles. Instead of a claw at the distal end, each of the ultimate legs features a small terminal segment with about ten setae. The penultimate segment of the same leg ranges from five to thirteen times longer than this terminal segment, with lower ratios mainly in young specimens. The telson lacks anal pores.

This species shares many traits with the other species in the genus Alloschizotaenia. For example, like the other two species in this genus, A. bipora and A. occidentalis, the species A. minuta features an elongated head, sternites without ventral pores, and ultimate legs with a few pores close to the sternite. Furthermore, each of the ultimate legs in A. minuta ends in a tubercle with setae rather than in a claw, as do the ultimate legs in the other species in this genus.

The species A. minuta can be distinguished from the other two species of Alloschizotaenia, however, based on other traits. For example, the clypeus features a tranverse row of four setae behind an anterior set of four setae in A. minuta but features only four setae at the front in A. bipora. Furthermore, the inner margin of the first article of the forcipule features a proximal tubercle as well as a distal tooth in A. bipora but only the distal tooth in A. minuta, and this article in A. occidentalis features only a small distal tubercle where A. minuta features a distinct tooth. Moreover, the anterior margin of the forcipular sternite features two pointed teeth in A. minuta but only two rounded tubercles in A. bipora and only a very shallow notch in the middle in A. occidentalis.
