= Magila =

Ward in Muheza District, Tanga Region

Magila Kata ya Magila (Swahili)
- Ward of Muheza District
- From top to bottom
- Interactive map of Magila
- Coordinates: 5°8′57.84″S 38°46′2.64″E
- Country: Tanzania
- Region: Tanga Region
- District: Muheza District

Area
  - Total: 25.4 km^{2} (9.8 sq mi)

Population (2012)
  - Total: 6,758

Ethnic groups
  - Settler: Swahili
  - Ancestral: Bondei
- Tanzanian Postal Code: 21407

Magila (Kata ya Magila, in Swahili) is an administrative ward in Muheza District of Tanga Region in Tanzania. Magoroto and Kicheba wards form the northern boundary of the ward. The Tanganyika ward is to the east. Kwemkabala, Mbaramo, and Tingeni are to the south. The ward covers an area of 25.4 km^{2} (9.8 sq mi), According to the 2012 census, the ward has a total population of 6,758.

== Administration ==
The postal code for Magila Ward is 21407. The ward is divided into the following neighborhoods (Mitaa):

- Jibandeni
- Kibaoni (Makungwi kwa Semweta)
- Kiumba
- Kwasabia
- Kwasemgaya
- Kwedunda
- Mabanduka
- Magazini

- Magila
- Mangachini
- Masoroko
- Mikwamba
- Misongeni
- Ntengwe
- Seluka

=== Government ===
The ward, like every other ward in the country, has local government offices based on the population served. The Magila Ward administration building houses a court as per the Ward Tribunal Act of 1988, including other vital departments for the administration the ward. The ward has the following administration offices:

- Magila Police Station
- Magila Government Office (Afisa Mtendaji)
- Magila Tribunal (Baraza La Kata) is a Department inside Ward Government Office

In the local government system of Tanzania, the ward is the smallest democratic unit. Each ward is composed of a committee of eight elected council members which include a chairperson, one salaried officer (with no voting rights), and an executive officer. One-third of seats are reserved for women councillors.

== Demographics ==
Like much of the district, the ward is the ancestral home of the Bondei people.

== Education and health ==
=== Education ===
The ward is home to these educational institutions:

- Magila Primary School
- Misongeni Primary School
- Magila Secondary School

=== Healthcare ===
The ward is home to the following health institutions:

- Magila Health Center
