= Pachymerium minutum =

Scientific classification
- Kingdom: Animalia
- Phylum: Arthropoda
- Subphylum: Myriapoda
- Class: Chilopoda
- Order: Geophilomorpha
- Family: Geophilidae
- Genus: Pachymerium
- Species: P. minutum

Binomial name
- Pachymerium minutum (Sseliwanoff,1884)

Synonyms
- Geophilus minutus Sseliwanoff,1884

Species of centipede

Pachymerium minutum is a species of soil centipede in the family Geophildae. This centipede is found in the European part of Russia. This species is notable for its small size, reaching only 17 mm in length, and modest number of legs, only 39 pairs in each sex, which is the minimum number of legs recorded for any European or Russian species of Pachymerium.

== Discovery and distribution ==
This species was first described in 1884 by the Russian myriapodologist Alexey V. Sseliwanoff. He based the original description of this species on eight specimens (two males and six females). These specimens were found in what is now Chaplygin (formerly Raneneberg) in the central part of European Russia. This species is known only from this type locality.

== Taxonomy ==
Sseliwanoff originally described this species in 1884 under the name Geophilus minutus. Authorities, however, expressed doubt regarding the proper taxonomic placement of this species. In 2014, the Italian biologists Lucio Bonato and Alessandro Minelli moved this species from the genus Geophilus to the genus Pachymerium. Authorities now accept P. minutum as the valid name for this species.

== Description ==
This species features 39 leg pairs in each sex and can reach 17 mm in length and 0.7 mm in width. The body is yellow, but the head is yellow-brown. The head is longer than wide. The forcipules extend beyond the anterior margin of the head. The first article of each forcipule features a small distal tooth, and the base of the ultimate article features a small tooth.

The main sternite of the last leg-bearing segment is shaped like a trapezoid and is usually slightly longer than wide. The basal element of the ultimate legs (coxopleuron) features 10 to 19 pores on the ventral and lateral surfaces. The openings of these pores are small and round but larger toward the front. The ultimate legs are longer than the penultimate legs, are swollen in males, and feature a small claw. The telson features small anal pores.

This species exhibits several traits that characterize the genus Pachymerium. For example, like other species in this genus, this centipede features an elongated head, a tooth on the first as well as on the ultimate article of the forcipule, and a sternite on the last leg-bearing segment that is at least as long as wide. Furthermore, as in other species in this genus, the ultimate legs feature scattered pores on each coxopleuron and bear claws.

This species shares a more extensive set of traits with another species in the same genus, P. ferrugineum, which is widespread in Europe and Russia. For example, in both species, the forcipules reach beyond the front of the head, the ultimate legs are more slender in females than in males, and the telson features anal pores. Furthermore, in both species, the main sternite of the last leg-bearing segment is shaped like a trapezoid.

These two species can be distinguished, however, based on other traits. For example, the coxopleuron features pores on the ventral and lateral surfaces in P. minutum, whereas the coxopleuron features pores on not only the ventral surface but also the dorsal surface in P. ferrugineum. Furthermore, although P. ferrugineum can feature a similar number of legs, this species usually features at least 41 pairs and often many more than the 39 pairs observed in P minutum. Moreover, P. ferrugineum is a much larger centipede, reaching 50 mm or even 70 mm in length.
