= Tanganyika, Muheza =

Ward in Muheza District, Tanga Region

Tanganyika Kata ya Tanganyika (Swahili)
- Ward of Muheza District
- From top to bottom
- Interactive map of Tanganyika
- Coordinates: 5°9′54.36″S 38°47′34.08″E
- Country: Tanzania
- Region: Tanga Region
- District: Muheza District

Area
  - Total: 6.3 km^{2} (2.4 sq mi)

Population (2012)
  - Total: 3,580

Ethnic groups
  - Settler: Swahili
  - Ancestral: Bondei
- Tanzanian Postal Code: 21406

Tanganyika (Kata ya Tanganyika, in Swahili) is an administrative ward in Muheza District of Tanga Region in Tanzania. The ward is part of the Muheza urban area. Kicheba defines the northern boundary of the ward. Lusanga is to the east, and Genge, Majengo, and Masuguru are to the south. Magila and Mabaramo form the western boundary of the ward. The ward covers an area of 6.3 km^{2} (2.4 sq mi), and has an average elevation of 200 m (660 ft). According to the 2012 census, the ward has a total population of 3,580.

== Administration ==
The postal code for Tanganyika Ward is 21406. The ward is divided into the following neighborhoods (Mitaa):

- Majani Mapana
- Muheza Estate

- Tangayika
- Ubena "B"

=== Government ===
The ward, like every other ward in the country, has local government offices based on the population served.The Tanganyika Ward administration building houses a court as per the Ward Tribunal Act of 1988, including other vital departments for the administration the ward. The ward has the following administration offices:

- Tanganyika Police Station
- Tanganyika Government Office (Afisa Mtendaji)
- Tanganyika Tribunal (Baraza La Kata) is a Department inside Ward Government Office

In the local government system of Tanzania, the ward is the smallest democratic unit. Each ward is composed of a committee of eight elected council members which include a chairperson, one salaried officer (with no voting rights), and an executive officer. One-third of seats are reserved for women councillors.

== Demographics ==
Like much of the district, the ward is the ancestral home of the Bondei people.

== Education and health ==
=== Education ===
The ward is home to these educational institutions:

- Muheza Primary School
- Mkurumuzi Secondary School

=== Healthcare ===
The ward is home to the following health institutions:

- Muheza District Hospital serves the ward
- Muheza Dispensary
