= Alloschizotaenia =

Scientific classification
- Kingdom: Animalia
- Phylum: Arthropoda
- Subphylum: Myriapoda
- Class: Chilopoda
- Order: Geophilomorpha
- Family: Geophilidae
- Genus: Alloschizotaenia; Brölemann, 1909

Type species
- Schizotaenia minuta Silvestri, 1907

Species
- Alloschizotaenia bipora; Alloschizotaenia minuta; Alloschizotaenia occidentalis

Genus of centipedes

Alloschizotaenia is a genus of soil centipedes in the family Geophilidae. This genus contains only three species. Centipedes in this genus are found in central and east Africa.

== Discovery, taxonomy, and distribution ==
This genus was first proposed by the French myriapodologist Henri W. Brölemann in 1909 to contain the type species Alloschizotaenia minuta, which was originally described under the name Schizotaenia minuta by the Italian zoologist Filippo Silvestri in 1907. Silvestri described of this species based on a small male specimen measuring only 9 mm in length. This specimen was found in Amani, in the Usumbara mountains, in what is now Tanzania. This holotype is deposited in the Zoological Museum in Hamburg.

In 1909, the Austrian myriapodologist Carl Attems described Schizotaenia pluvia as a new species based on syntypes including both sexes. These specimens were collected by the Swedish naturalist Yngve Sjöstedt on Mount Meru in 1905 and 1906 in what is now Tanzania. One syntype of each sex and other type material in the form of slides are deposited in the Natural History Museum in Vienna; another male syntype is stored at the Natural History Museum in Berlin.

In 1914, the French zoologist Henri Ribaut deemed Schizotaenia pluvia to be a junior synonym of Alloschizotaenia minuta, and authorities now consider these centipedes to be the same species. Ribaut studied numerous A. minuta specimens of different ages and concluded that Silvestri's small specimen was young and that the slight differences between the descriptions provided by Silvestri and Attems flow from intraspecific variation among specimens of different ages. The specimens studied by Ribaut included both sexes and were collected in 1912 by the French zoologists Charles A. Alluaud and René Jeannel, who found these specimens at several different sites, including the Kikuyu escarpment near the town of Kijabé as well as the alpine meadows of Mount Kinangop in the Aberdare Range, both locations in Kenya, and the alpine meadows near Moshi on the slopes of Mount Kilimanjaro in what is now Tanzania.

In 1937, Attems described Alloschizotaenia occidentalis as a new species based on a female holotype. The Belgian zoologist Henri Schouteden collected this specimen in 1925 in Ituri Province in what is now the Democratic Republic of the Congo. The holotype is deposited in the Natural History Museum in Vienna. Since the original description of this species, this centipede has also been recorded at localities in western Kenya, including sites on Mount Elgon and in the Cherang'any Hills.

In 1952, Attems described Alloschizotaenia bipora as another new species in the same genus. He based the original description of this species on several syntypes, including nine males, five females, and one juvenile, collected by the Belgian zoologist Narcisse Leleup in the Rugege forest in Rwanda in 1951. The syntypes are deposited in the Natural History Museum in Vienna. In 1958, the Czech myriapodologist Luděk J. Dobroruka reported the discovery of six specimens of A. bipora (four males and two females) collected by the Austrian zoologist Herbert Franz in 1954 in the town of Yangambi in the Democratic Republic of the Congo.

== Description ==
Species in this genus feature elongate heads and forcipules. The coxosternite of the second maxillae is divided lengthwise in the middle. The sternites lack ventral pores. The basal element of each of the ultimate legs features a few pores close to the corresponding sternite, and each of these legs ends in a spinous tubercle.

Centipedes in this genus are relatively small, ranging from about 1 cm to about 2 cm in length. Each of the species A. minuta and A. bipora reaches a maximum recorded length of only 18 mm. Similarly, the holotype for the species A. occidentalis measures only 17 mm in length.

These species also feature similar numbers of legs. The species A. bipora features 39 pairs of legs in each sex, and the female holotype for the species A. occidentalis also has 39 leg pairs. The species A. minuta exhibits intraspecific variation in leg number: Males of this species feature 37, 39, or 41 leg pairs, and females feature 39 or 41 pairs.

== Phylogeny ==
A phylogenetic analysis of the order Geophilomorpha using both molecular data and morphology places a representative of the genus Alloschizotaenia (A. minuta) in a clade with a representative of Arctogeophilus, another genus in the family Geophilidae. This phylogenetic tree suggests that the genera Alloschizotaenia and Arctogeophilus are more closely related to one another than any other genera included in this analysis. These two close relatives form a sister group for another clade formed by representatives of two more genera in the same family, Pachymerium and Schendyloides, which emerge as the next closest relatives included in this analysis.
