= Pachymerium caucasicum =

Scientific classification
- Domain: Eukaryota
- Kingdom: Animalia
- Phylum: Arthropoda
- Subphylum: Myriapoda
- Class: Chilopoda
- Order: Geophilomorpha
- Family: Geophilidae
- Genus: Pachymerium
- Species: P. caucasicum

Binomial name
- Pachymerium caucasicum (Attems, 1903)

Synonyms
- Geophilus caucasicum Attems, 1903

Species of centipede

Pachymerium caucasicum is a species of centipede in Geophilidae family. It was described by Carl Attems in 1903 and is endemic to the European part of Turkey. Males of this species have 47 pairs of legs; females have 49 pairs of legs. Authorities now deem P. caucasicum to be a junior synonym of P. ferrugineum.
