= Majengo, Muheza =

Ward in Muheza District, Tanga Region

Majengo Kata ya Majengo (Swahili)
- Ward of Muheza District
- From top to bottom
- Interactive map of Majengo
- Coordinates: 5°10′41.52″S 38°47′26.88″E
- Country: Tanzania
- Region: Tanga Region
- District: Muheza District

Area
  - Total: 1.6 km^{2} (0.62 sq mi)

Population (2012)
  - Total: 6,992

Ethnic groups
  - Settler: Swahili
  - Ancestral: Bondei
- Tanzanian Postal Code: 21401

Majengo (Kata ya Majengo, in Swahili) is an administrative ward in Muheza District of Tanga Region in Tanzania. Tanganyika forms the northern boundary of the ward. Genge is in the east. Kilulu is to the south. Kwemkabala and Masuguru wards are to the west. The ward covers an area of 1.6 km^{2} (0.62 sq mi). According to the 2012 census, the ward has a total population of 6,992.

== Administration ==
The postal code for Majengo Ward is 21402. The ward is divided into the following neighborhoods (Mitaa):

- Majengo
- Majengo Kati
- Majengo Ndani

- Majengo Nje
- Mdote
- Shaurimoyo

=== Government ===
The ward, like every other ward in the country, has local government offices based on the population served.The Majengo Ward administration building houses a court as per the Ward Tribunal Act of 1988, including other vital departments for the administration the ward. The ward has the following administration offices:

- Majengo Police Station
- Majengo Government Office (Afisa Mtendaji)
- Majengo Tribunal (Baraza La Kata) is a Department inside Ward Government Office

In the local government system of Tanzania, the ward is the smallest democratic unit. Each ward is composed of a committee of eight elected council members which include a chairperson, one salaried officer (with no voting rights), and an executive officer. One-third of seats are reserved for women councillors.

== Demographics ==
Like much of the district, the ward is the ancestral home of the Bondei people.

== Education and health ==
=== Education ===
The ward is home to these educational institutions:

- Mdote Primary School
- Majengo Primary School
- Jamhuri Primary School
- Al-Huda Secondary School

=== Healthcare ===
The ward is home to the following health institutions:

- Majengo Health Center
