= Pachymerium tabacarui =

Scientific classification
- Domain: Eukaryota
- Kingdom: Animalia
- Phylum: Arthropoda
- Subphylum: Myriapoda
- Class: Chilopoda
- Order: Geophilomorpha
- Family: Geophilidae
- Genus: Pachymerium
- Species: P. tabacarui

Binomial name
- Pachymerium tabacarui Câpuse, 1968

Species of centipede

Pachymerium tabacarui is a species of centipede in Geophilidae family that is endemic to Romania. The original description of this species is based on a female specimen from the Carpathians measuring 15 mm in length with 53 pairs of legs. Some authorities consider this description consistent with a juvenile specimen of P. ferrugineum and therefore deem P. tabacarui to be a junior synonym of that species. A more recent review of this description suggests that P. tabacarui is a junior synonym of Geophilus flavus rather than P. ferrugineum. Extensive investigations in the Carpathian region have failed to collect any more specimens.
