= Pachymerium antipai =

Scientific classification
- Domain: Eukaryota
- Kingdom: Animalia
- Phylum: Arthropoda
- Subphylum: Myriapoda
- Class: Chilopoda
- Order: Geophilomorpha
- Family: Geophilidae
- Genus: Pachymerium
- Species: P. antipai

Binomial name
- Pachymerium antipai Câpuse, 1968

Species of centipede

Pachymerium antipai is a species of centipede in the Geophilidae family found in Romania. This species is yellow-brown and can reach 30 mm in length. A review of the original description of this species suggests that P. antipai may be a junior synonym of P. ferrugineum.
