= Pande Darajani =

Ward in Muheza District, Tanga Region

Pande Darajani Kata ya Pande Darajani (Swahili)
- Ward of Muheza District
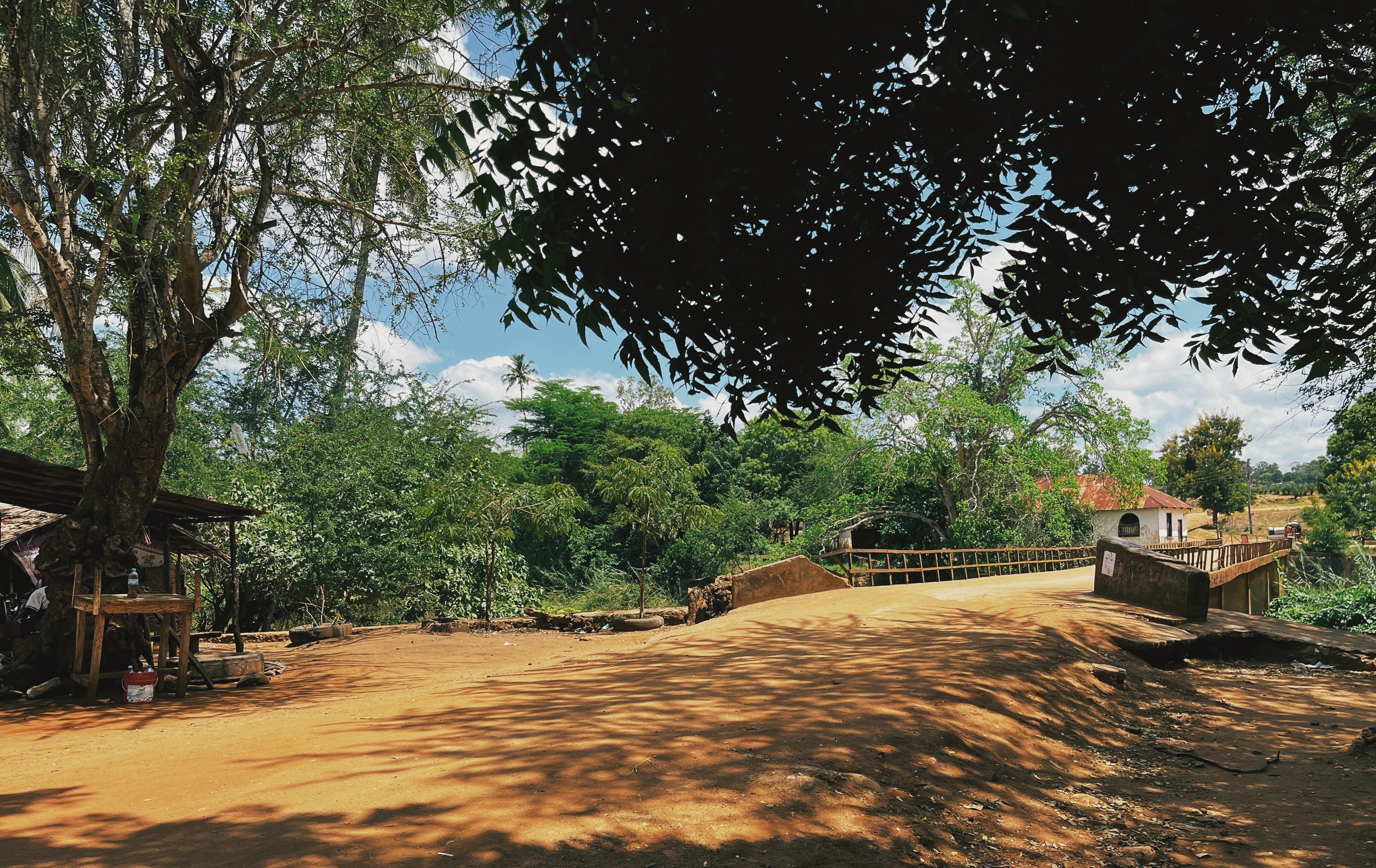
- From top to bottom: The Brige at Pande Darajani ward into Mkinga
- Interactive map of Pande Darajani
- Coordinates: 5°3′31.68″S 38°51′8.28″E
- Country: Tanzania
- Region: Tanga Region
- District: Muheza District

Area
  - Total: 51.1 km^{2} (19.7 sq mi)

Population (2012)
  - Total: 3,681

Ethnic groups
  - Settler: Swahili
  - Ancestral: Bondei
- Tanzanian Postal Code: 21418

Pande Darajani (Kata ya Pande Darajani, in Swahili) is an administrative ward in Muheza District of Tanga Region in Tanzania. The Mhinduro and Mnyenzani wards of Mkinga border the ward on its northern side. The Kiomoni of Tanga is to the east. Kicheba and Mlingoni are to the south. Misozwe is in the west. The ward covers an area of 51.1 km^{2} (19.7 sq mi), According to the 2012 census, the ward has a total population of 3,681.

== Administration ==
The postal code for Pande Darajani Ward is 21418. The ward is divided into the following neighborhoods (Mitaa):

- Darajani
- Jitengeni
- Kibaranga

- Kifaru
- Mijohorni
- Upale

=== Government ===
The ward, like every other ward in the country, has local government offices based on the population served.The Pande Darajani Ward administration building houses a court as per the Ward Tribunal Act of 1988, including other vital departments for the administration the ward. The ward has the following administration offices:

- Pande Darajani Police Station
- Pande Darajani Government Office (Afisa Mtendaji)
- Pande Darajani Tribunal (Baraza La Kata) is a Department inside Ward Government Office

In the local government system of Tanzania, the ward is the smallest democratic unit. Each ward is composed of a committee of eight elected council members which include a chairperson, one salaried officer (with no voting rights), and an executive officer. One-third of seats are reserved for women councillors.

== Demographics ==
Like much of the district, the ward is the ancestral home of the Bondei people.

== Education and health ==
=== Education ===
The ward is home to these educational institutions:

- Mjesani Primary School
- Zigi Primary School
- Zigi Secondary School

=== Healthcare ===
The ward is home to the following health institutions:

- Pande Health Center
