= Kisiwani, Muheza =

Ward in Muheza District, Tanga Region

Kisiwani Kata ya Kisiwani (Swahili)
- Ward of Muheza District
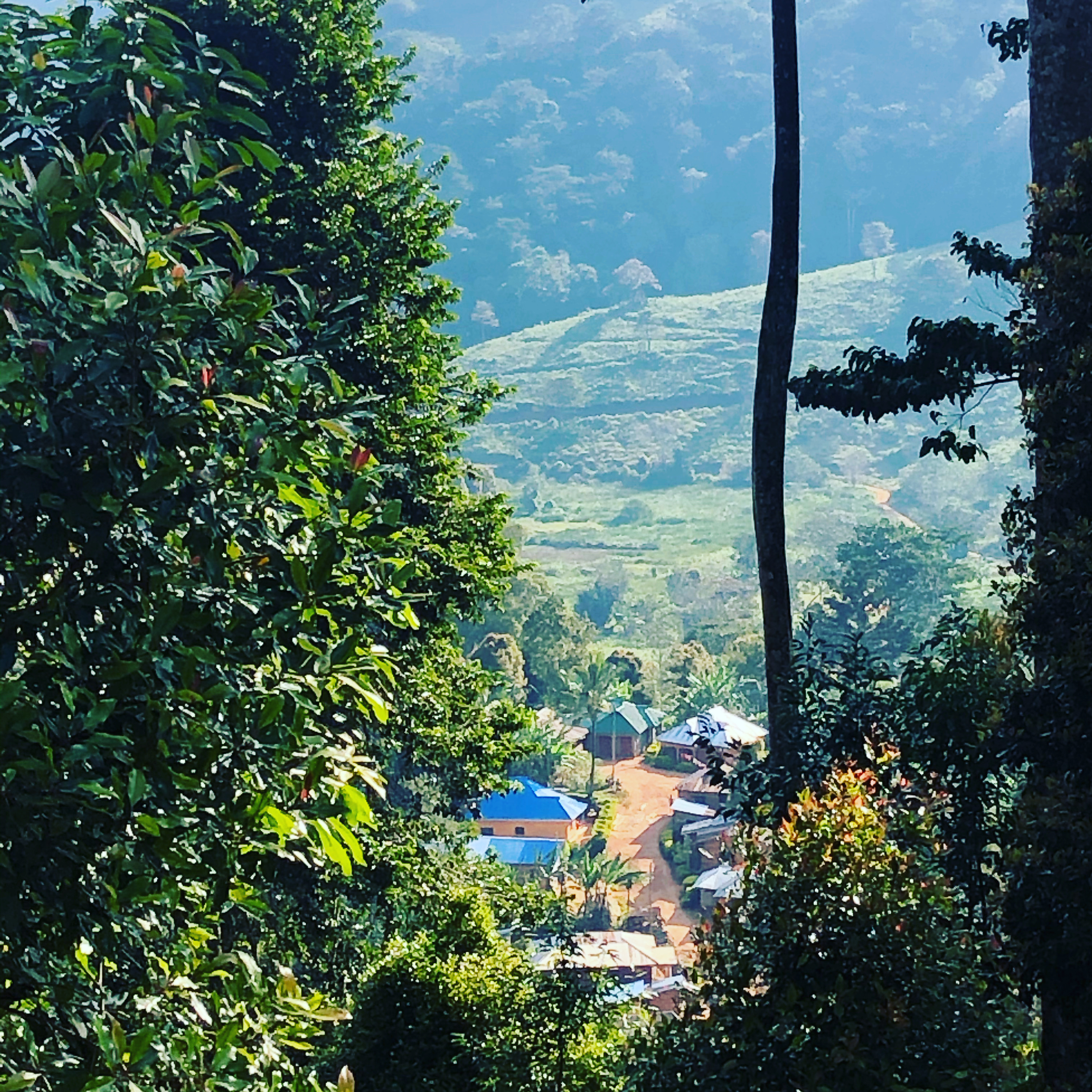
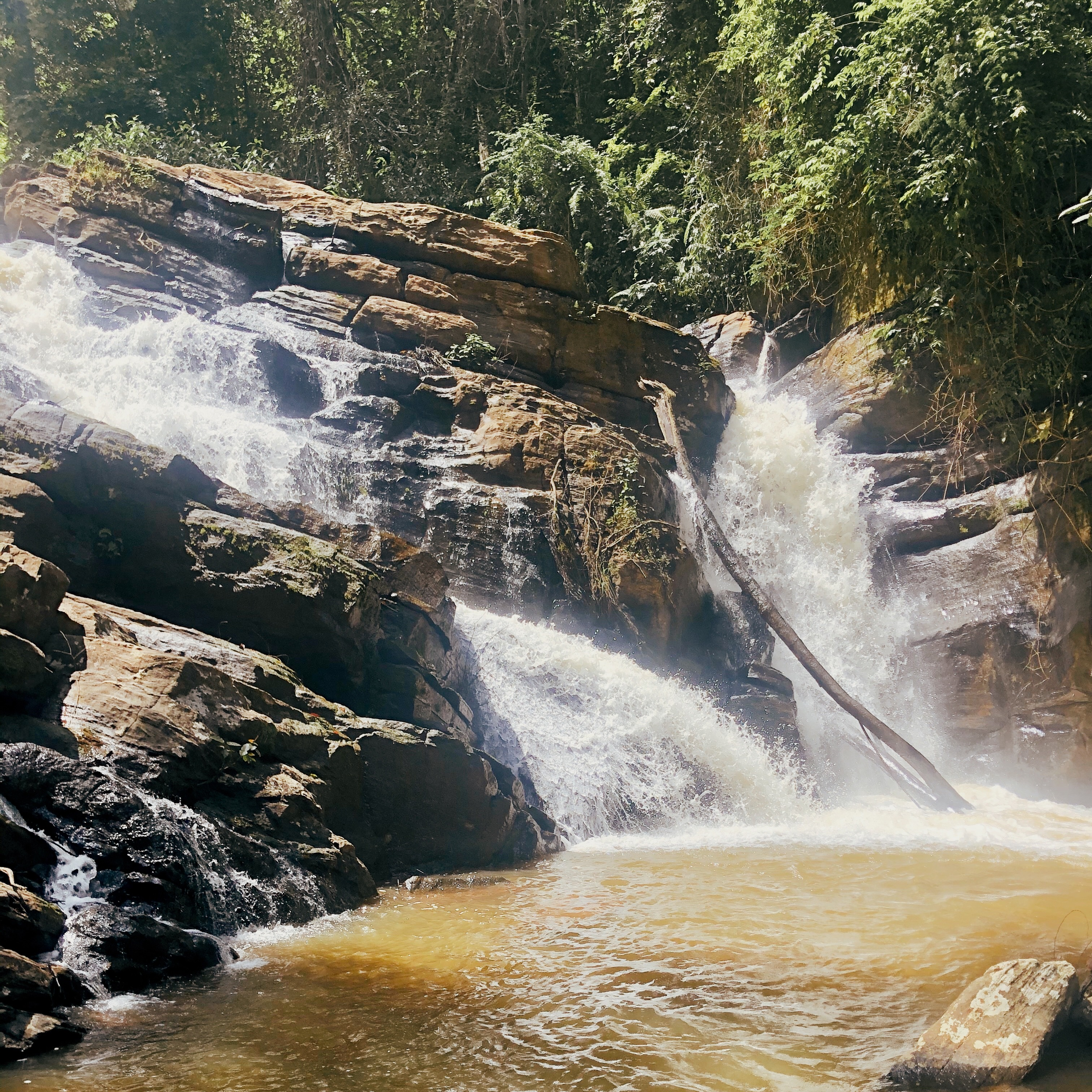
- From top to bottom: Village scene in Kisiwani Ward & Derema Falls in Kisiwiani
- Interactive map of Kisiwani
- Coordinates: 5°8′54.24″S 38°40′24.96″E
- Country: Tanzania
- Region: Tanga Region
- District: Muheza District

Area
  - Total: 74.5 km^{2} (28.8 sq mi)

Population (2012)
  - Total: 7,123

Ethnic groups
  - Settler: Swahili & Shambaa
  - Ancestral: Bondei
- Tanzanian Postal Code: 21427

Kisiwani (Kata ya Kisiwani, in Swahili) is an administrative ward in Muheza District of Tanga Region in Tanzania. Zirai forms the ward's northern boundary. Tongwe and Misozwe are to the east. Bwembwera and Potwe are to the south. Misalai and Amani form the western boundary of the ward. The ward covers an area of 74.5 km^{2} (28.8 sq mi), and has an average elevation of 304 m (997 ft). According to the 2012 census, the ward has a total population of 7,123.

== Administration ==
The postal code for Kisiwani Ward is 21427. The ward is divided into the following neighborhoods (Mitaa):

- Fanusi
- Ikulu
- Kilimeni
- Kisiwani
- Kitivo
- Kwedilima
- Kwekuyu
- Kwemdimu

- Kwemnazi
- Kwemuyu
- Magoda
- Majengo
- Mamboleo
- Mashewa
- Misima

- Mkuzi
- Mlola
- Sega
- Shembekeza
- Shembekeza "A"
- Shembekeza "B"

=== Government ===
The ward, like every other ward in the country, has local government offices based on the population served.The Kisiwani Ward administration building houses a court as per the Ward Tribunal Act of 1988, including other vital departments for the administration the ward. The ward has the following administration offices:

- Kisiwani Police Station
- Kisiwani Government Office (Afisa Mtendaji)
- Kisiwani Tribunal (Baraza La Kata) is a Department inside Ward Government Office

In the local government system of Tanzania, the ward is the smallest democratic unit. Each ward is composed of a committee of eight elected council members which include a chairperson, one salaried officer (with no voting rights), and an executive officer. One-third of seats are reserved for women councillors.

== Demographics ==
Like much of the district, the ward is the ancestral home of the Bondei people.

== Education and health ==
=== Education ===
The ward is home to these educational institutions:

- Mashewa Primary School
- Kwemdimu Primary School

=== Healthcare ===
The ward is home to the following health institutions:

- Kisiwani Health Center
- Derema Health Center
