= EDGE of Existence programme =

Research and conservation initiative

The EDGE of Existence programme is a research and conservation initiative that focuses on species deemed to be the world's most Evolutionarily Distinct and Globally Endangered (EDGE) species. Developed by the Zoological Society of London (ZSL), the programme aims to raise awareness of these species, implement targeted research and conservation actions to halt their decline, and to train in-country conservationists (called EDGE Fellows) to protect them.

EDGE species are animal species which have a high 'EDGE score', a metric combining endangered conservation status with the genetic distinctiveness of the particular taxon. Distinctive species have few closely related species, and EDGE species are often the only surviving member of their genus or even higher taxonomic rank. The extinction of such species would therefore represent a disproportionate loss of unique evolutionary history and biodiversity. The EDGE logo is the echidna.

Some EDGE species, such as elephants and pandas, are well-known and already receive considerable conservation attention, but many others, such as the vaquita (the world's rarest cetacean) the bumblebee bat (arguably the world's smallest mammal) and the egg-laying long-beaked echidnas, are highly threatened yet remain poorly understood, and are frequently overlooked by existing conservation frameworks.

The Zoological Society of London launched the EDGE of Existence Programme in 2007 to raise awareness and funds for the conservation of these species. As of 2024, the programme has awarded fellows funds to help conserve 157 different species in 47 countries. The programme lists key supporters as the Fondation Franklinia, On the EDGE, and Darwin Initiative. Donors include the IUCN, US Fish and Wildlife Service, and numerous non-governmental organisations and foundations.

In 2024, researchers at the programme identified EDGE Zones that make up 0.7% of Earth's surface but are home to one-third of the world's four-legged EDGE species.

== Conserving EDGE species ==
The EDGE of Existence programme is centred on an interactive website that features information on the top EDGE species detailing their specific conservation requirements. 70% of the mammals which have been chosen are receiving little or no conservation attention according to the inventors.

== EDGE Fellows ==
EDGE research and conservation is carried out by ZSL researchers, a network of partner organizations and local scientists. An important part of the EDGE programme is a fellowship scheme which provides funding and support to local scientists. EDGE Fellows participate in all phases of a research project. Each project is focused on delivering a conservation action plan. Once the action plan is completed, a meeting is held to make additions and corrections to the document.

== Calculating EDGE Scores ==
=== ED ===
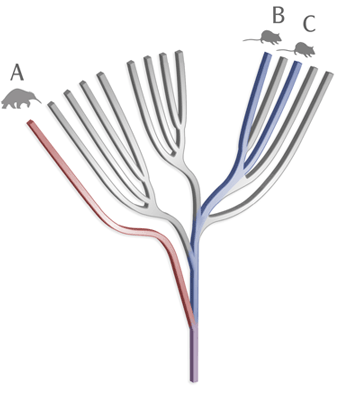
In this phylogenetic tree, species A has a higher ED score than either species B or C—it represents a branch rather than a twig on the tree of life. If species A were to go extinct, there would be no similar species left on the planet and a larger amount of unique evolutionary history would be lost forever.

Some species are more distinct than others because they represent a larger amount of unique evolution. Species like the aardvark have few close relatives and have been evolving independently for many millions of years. Others like the domestic dog originated only recently and have many close relatives. Species uniqueness can be measured as an 'Evolutionary Distinctiveness' (ED) score, using a phylogeny, or evolutionary tree. ED scores are calculated relative to a clade of species descended from a common ancestor. The three clades for which the EDGE of Existence Programme has calculated scores are all classes, namely mammals, amphibians, and corals.

The phylogenetic tree has the most recent common ancestor at the root, all the current species as the leaves, and intermediate nodes at each point of branching divergence. The branches are divided into segments (between one node and another node, a leaf, or the root). Each segment is assigned an ED score defined as the timespan it covers (in millions of years) divided by the number of species at the end of the subtree it forms. The ED of a species is the sum of the ED of the segments connecting it to the root. Thus, a long branch which produces few species will have a high ED, as the corresponding species are relatively distinctive, with few close relatives. ED metrics are not exact, because of uncertainties in both the ordering of nodes and the length of segments.

=== GE ===
GE is a number corresponding to a species' conservation status according to the International Union for Conservation of Nature with more endangered species having a higher GE:

| Conservation status | Code | GE score |
|---|---|---|
| Extinct | EX | — |
| Extinct in the wild | EW | — |
| Critically endangered | CR | 4 |
| Endangered | EN | 3 |
| Vulnerable | VU | 2 |
| Near threatened | NT | 1 |
| Least concern | LC | 0 |
| Data deficient | DD | — |
| Not evaluated | NE | — |

=== EDGE ===
The EDGE score of a species is derived from its scores for Evolutionary Distinctness (ED) and for Globally Endangered status (GE) as follows:

$$\text{EDGE} = \ln (1+\text{ED}) + \text{GE}\cdot \ln (2)= \ln[(1+\text{ED})\cdot 2^{\text{GE}}]$$

This means that a doubling in ED affects the EDGE score almost as much as increasing the threat level by one (e.g. from 'vulnerable' to 'endangered'). EDGE scores are an estimate of the expected loss of evolutionary history per unit time.

EDGE species are species which have an above average ED score and are threatened with extinction (critically endangered, endangered or vulnerable). There are currently 564 EDGE mammal species (≈12% of the total). Potential EDGE species are those with high ED scores but whose conservation status is unclear (data deficient or not evaluated).

== EDGE lists and focal species ==
Of more than 2,000 EDGE species, the organization selects focal species. These focal species are primarily from the highest EDGE-scoring animals or corals. The organization may also prioritize species that have only a high ED, evolutionary distinctness, score. These focal species are conserved by fellows who collect data and develop conservation action plans. Fellows have previously collaborated with institutions like National Geographic and The Disney Conservation Fund.

Top 3 ranked species on the 2024 EDGE lists for amphibians, birds, gymnosperms, mammals, ray-finned fish, lepidosaurs, crocodylians, testudines, and sharks and rays:

=== Amphibians ===
1. Bale Mountains frog
2. Amani forest frog
3. Bale Mountains tree frog

=== Birds ===
1. Giant ibis
2. Kakapo
3. New Caledonian owlet-nightjar

=== Gymnosperms ===
1. Maidenhair tree
2. Wollemi pine
3. Parana pine

=== Mammals ===
1. Mountain pygmy possum
2. Aye-aye
3. Leadbeater's possum

=== Ray-finned fish ===
1. Salamanderfish
2. Typhleotris pauliani
3. Barrow cave gudgeon

=== Lepidosaur ===
1. Madagascar blindsnake
2. Chinese crocodile lizard
3. Borneo earless monitor

=== Crocodylians ===
1. Gharial
2. Chinese alligator
3. False gharial

=== Testudines ===
1. Madagascar big-headed turtle
2. Western swamp turtle
3. Big-headed turtle

=== Sharks and rays ===
1. Narrow sawfish
2. Bowmouth guitarfish
3. Largetooth sawfish

Species with an EDGE median score over 100 are the maidenhair tree and wollemi pine. Examples of Critically Endangered species with very low EDGE median scores, 1 or below due to low evolutionary distinctness, are the Algerian fir, Visayan warty pig, and pindu. The number of EDGE species varies by taxonomic group. For example, 8 crocodylians are EDGE species, representing more than 30% of crocodylians. Meanwhile 908 amphibians are EDGE species, representing less than 15% of amphibians.
