= Pachymerium syriacum =

Scientific classification
- Domain: Eukaryota
- Kingdom: Animalia
- Phylum: Arthropoda
- Subphylum: Myriapoda
- Class: Chilopoda
- Order: Geophilomorpha
- Family: Geophilidae
- Genus: Pachymerium
- Species: P. syriacum

Binomial name
- Pachymerium syriacum (Attems, 1903)

Synonyms
- Geophilus syriacum Attems, 1903

Species of centipede

Pachymerium syriacum is a species of centipede in the family Geophilidae. The original description of this species is based on a female specimen measuring 110 mm in length with 87 pairs of legs. Authorities now place this species in another genus under the name Gnathoribautia syriaca, a species found in Turkey, Greece, and Lebanon.
