= Alloschizotaenia occidentalis =

Scientific classification
- Kingdom: Animalia
- Phylum: Arthropoda
- Subphylum: Myriapoda
- Class: Chilopoda
- Order: Geophilomorpha
- Family: Geophilidae
- Genus: Alloschizotaenia
- Species: A. occidentalis

Binomial name
- Alloschizotaenia occidentalis Attems, 1937

Species of centipede

Alloschizotaenia occidentalis is a species of soil centipede in the family Geophilidae. This centipede can reach 17 mm in length and features 39 pairs of legs. This species is found in the Democratic Republic of the Congo and Kenya.

== Discovery and distribution ==
This species was first described in 1937 by the Austrian myriapodologist Carl Attems. He based the original description of this species on a female specimen collected by the Belgian zoologist Henri Schouteden in 1925 in Ituri Province in what is now the Democratic Republic of the Congo. This holotype is deposited in the Natural History Museum in Vienna. Since the original description of this species, this centipede has also been recorded at localities in western Kenya, including sites on Mount Elgon and in the Cherang'any Hills.

== Description ==
The female holotype for this species is yellow, measures 17 mm in length, and features 39 pairs of legs. The head is longer than wide, with a length/width ratio of about 1.4. The anterior part of the clypeus features a paler area with four bristles followed by a transverse row of small bristles. The middle part of the labrum is narrow and bears four conical teeth. Each lateral part of the labrum features a fringe of long filaments. Each of the second maxillae ends in a simple claw.

The coxosternite of the forcipules features short lines of chitin and a very shallow notch in the middle of the anterior margin. The first article of the forcipule features a small pale tubercle at the distal end of the inner margin. The most distal article features a large pointed tooth at the base and ends in a smooth claw.

The main tergite of each leg-bearing segment features two rows of setae, whereas the pretergite (sclerite in front of the main tergite) features only one. The sternites are longer than wide and lack ventral pores. The basal element of each of the ultimate legs (coxopleuron) features a group of three large pores hidden beneath the adjacent sternite. Instead of a claw at the distal end, each of the ultimate legs features a small terminal segment shaped like an egg and bearing setae that are fine and short. The telson lacks anal pores.

This species shares many traits with the other species in the genus Alloschizotaenia. For example, like the other two species in this genus, A. bipora and A. minuta, the species A. occidentalis features an elongated head, sternites without ventral pores, and ultimate legs with a few pores close to the sternite. Furthermore, each of the ultimate legs in A. occidentalis ends in a tubercle with setae rather than in a claw, as do the ultimate legs in the other two species in this genus.

The species A. occidentalis can be distinguished from the other two species of Alloschizotaenia, however, based on other traits. For example, the inner margin of the first article of the forcipule features a proximal tubercle as well as a distal tooth in A. bipora but only a small distal tubercle in A. occidentalis, and this article in A. minuta features a distinct tooth where A. occidentalis features only a small tubercle. Furthermore, the anterior margin of the forcipular sternite features two pointed teeth in A. minuta and two rounded tubercles in A. bipora but only a very shallow notch in the middle in A. occidentalis.

The only other Alloschizotaenia species found in central Africa, A. bipora, may also be distinguished from A. occidentalis based on other features. For example, the clypeus features a tranverse row of small setae behind an anterior set of four setae in A. occidentalis but features only four setae at the front in A. bipora. Furthermore, where each of the ultimate legs in A. occidentalis has three pores, A. bipora has only two pores. Moreover, each of the first maxillae in A. bipora features a projection on the basal article, whereas this projection is absent in A. occidentalis.
