= Arctogeophilus inopinatus =

Scientific classification
- Kingdom: Animalia
- Phylum: Arthropoda
- Subphylum: Myriapoda
- Class: Chilopoda
- Order: Geophilomorpha
- Family: Geophilidae
- Genus: Arctogeophilus
- Species: A. inopinatus

Binomial name
- Arctogeophilus inopinatus (Ribaut, 1911)

Synonyms
- Gnathomerium inopinatus Ribaut, 1911

Species of centipede

Arctogeophilus inopinatus, the unexpected geophilus, is a species of soil centipede in the family Geophildae. This centipede is found in western and central France and may also be present in Luxembourg. This species is small, measuring only 18 mm in length, and can have either 39 or 41 pairs of legs.

== Discovery and taxonomy ==
This species was first described under the name Gnathomerium inopinatus in 1910 by the French zoologist Henri Ribaut. He based the original description of this species on specimens of both sexes, collected from Lyons-la-Forêt and from the summit of Puy-de-Dôme, both locations in France. In 1914, the Austrian myriapodologist Carl Attems deemed Gnathomerium to be a junior synonym of Arctogeophilus, a taxon originally proposed by Attems in 1909 as a subgenus of the genus Geophilus but elevated to the status of genus in 1910 by Ribaut. Authorities now consider Arctogeophilus to be the valid name for Gnathomerium.

== Etymology ==
The genus name Arctogeophilus comes from Ancient Greek ἄρκτος (árktos), meaning "bear," γεω- (geo-), meaning "earth," and φίλος (phílos), meaning "lover." The name alludes to the northern distribution of this genus, in the direction of the Ursa Major constellation. The specific epithet inopinatus means "unexpected" in Latin.

== Description ==
This species can have either 39 or 41 pairs of legs in each sex. These centipedes are small, reaching only 18 mm in length and 0.8 mm in width. The body is light yellow, but the head is darker. The head is longer than wide (with a length/width ratio of 1.3). The side pieces of the labrum meet one another in front of the middle part. Each article of the forcipule features a denticle on the internal margin, with a prominent basal denticle on the ultimate article. The sternites lack fields of pores. About fifteen small scattered pores appear on the ventral and lateral surfaces of the basal element of the ultimate legs, with no pores on the dorsal surface. The ultimate legs are much longer than the preceding legs and do not end in claws. The ultimate legs are swollen in the male but slender in the female. The male gonopod features two joints. Anal pores are present on the telson.

This species shares many traits with other Arctogeophilus species. For example, like other species in this genus, A. inopinatus features an elongated head, a basal denticle on the ultimate article of the forcipule, sternites without ventral pore fields, scattered pores on the ultimate legs, and ultimate legs that are longer than the penultimate legs. Furthermore, as in other species in this genus, the side pieces of the labrum meet in front of the middle part.

The only other Arctogeophilus species found in western Europe, the German species A. wolfi, closely resembles A. inopinatus, with a similar shape for the head and the body, a similar distribution of pores on the ultimate legs, ultimate legs that are much longer than the preceding legs, and anal pores on the telson. These two species, however, may be distinguished based on several other features. For example, unlike the ultimate legs in A. inopinatus, those in A. wolfi end in claws, like those at the distal end of the preceding legs. Furthermore, A. wolfi is somewhat smaller (only 14 mm in length and 0.55 mm in width) and has several more leg pairs (49 pairs) than A. inopinatus does.

== Distribution ==
The species A. inopinatus has been observed in several regions of mainland France, including Brittany, Haute-Normandie, Auvergne, and the Morvan. This species has also been found in other areas of France, including the Seine-et-Marne department of the Île-de-France region and all departments of the Pays de la Loire region. Authorities have expressed some doubt regarding the reported presence of this species in Luxembourg.
