= Arctogeophilus =

Scientific classification
- Kingdom: Animalia
- Phylum: Arthropoda
- Subphylum: Myriapoda
- Class: Chilopoda
- Order: Geophilomorpha
- Family: Geophilidae
- Genus: Arctogeophilus; Attems, 1909

Type species
- Geophilus glacialis Attems, 1909

Synonyms
- Cryophilus Chamberlin, 1919; Gnathomerium Ribaut, 1911; Idiona Chamberlin, 1946

Genus of centipedes

Arctogeophilus is a genus of soil centipedes in the family Geophildae. These centipedes are found in subarctic and temperate regions of Asia, North America, and western Europe. This genus includes fourteen species.

== Taxonomy and etymology ==
The taxon Arctogeophilus was first proposed in 1909 by the Austrian myriapodologist Carl Attems as a subgenus within the genus Geophilus. The name of this taxon derives from the Ancient Greek words ἄρκτος (árktos), meaning "bear," γεω- (geo-), meaning "earth," and φίλος (phílos), meaning "lover." The name alludes to the northern distribution of this genus, in the direction of the Ursa Major constellation. The French zoologist Henri Ribaut elevated Arctogeophilus to the rank of genus in 1910.

== Description ==
Species in this genus have markedly elongate heads. The side pieces of the labrum almost touch in the middle, with the intermediate part inconspicuous. The forcipule is elongate, especially the first article, which features a distal denticle. The ultimate article of the forcipule features a basal denticle. The sterna have no carpophagus structures and usually no clusters of pores. The ultimate legs are longer than the penultimate legs, and the basal part of each of the ultimate legs usually features scattered pores.

Centipedes in this genus range from less than 2 cm to 5 cm in length and have 35 to 69 pairs of legs. The Russian species Arctogeophilus sachalinus and the German species A. wolfi are notable for their small sizes, measuring only 11 mm and 14 mm in length, respectively. The North American species A. melanonotus is notable for its large size, reaching 50 mm in length. The Russian species A. macrocephalus can have as few as 35 leg pairs, the minimum number recorded in this genus. The North American species A. atopus can have as many as 69 leg pairs, the maximum number recorded in this genus.

== Phylogeny ==
A phylogenetic analysis of the order Geophilomorpha using both molecular data and morphology places a representative of the genus Arctogephilus (A. glacialis) in a clade with a representative of Alloschizotaenia, another genus in the family Geophilidae. This phylogenetic tree suggests that the genera Arctogeophilus and Alloschizotaenia are more closely related to one another than any other genera included in this analysis. These two close relatives form a sister group for another clade formed by representatives of two more genera in the same family, Pachymerium and Schendyloides, which emerge as the next closest relatives included in this analysis.

== Species ==
This genus includes the following species:

- Arctogeophilus atopus (Chamberlin, 1902)
- Arctogeophilus attemsi Folkmanová, 1956
- Arctogeophilus corvallis Chamberlin, 1941
- Arctogeophilus fulvus (Wood, 1862)
- Arctogeophilus glacialis (Attems, 1909)
- Arctogeophilus inopinatus (Ribaut, 1911)
- Arctogeophilus insularis Attems, 1947
- Arctogeophilus macrocephalus Folkmanova & Dobroruka, 1960
- Arctogeophilus melanonotus (Wood, 1862)
- Arctogeophilus quadratus (Wood, 1867)
- Arctogeophilus sachalinus Verhoeff, 1934
- Arctogeophilus shelfordi (Chamberlin, 1946)
- Arctogeophilus umbraticus (McNeill, 1887)
- Arctogeophilus wolfi (Ribaut, 1912)
