= Uluguru blue-bellied frog =

Conservation status
- Endangered (IUCN 3.1)

Scientific classification
- Kingdom: Animalia
- Phylum: Chordata
- Class: Amphibia
- Order: Anura
- Family: Microhylidae
- Genus: Hoplophryne
- Species: H. uluguruensis

Binomial name
- Hoplophryne uluguruensis Barbour & Loveridge, 1928

Species of amphibian

The Uluguru blue-bellied frog (Hoplophryne uluguruensis) is a species of frog in the family Microhylidae. It is endemic to Tanzania. Its natural habitats are subtropical or tropical moist lowland forests and subtropical or tropical moist montane forests. It is threatened by habitat loss.
