= Arctogeophilus glacialis =

Scientific classification
- Kingdom: Animalia
- Phylum: Arthropoda
- Subphylum: Myriapoda
- Class: Chilopoda
- Order: Geophilomorpha
- Family: Geophilidae
- Genus: Arctogeophilus
- Species: A. glacialis

Binomial name
- Arctogeophilus glacialis (Attems, 1909)

Synonyms
- Geophilus glacialis Attems, 1909; Cryophilus alaskanus Chamberlin, 1919

Species of centipede

Arctogeophilus glacialis, the glacial geophilus, is a species of soil centipede in the family Geophildae. This centipede is found in Russia, Alaska, and Canada. This species was first described in 1909 by the Austrian myriapodologist Carl Attems as the type species for the taxon Arctogeophilus, which was originally described as a subgenus of the genus Geophilus but was elevated to the status of genus in 1910 by the French zoologist Henri Ribaut.

== Discovery, taxonomy, and distribution ==
Attems based the original description of this species on several type specimens, including three males and four females. These syntypes were found in 1879 at Port Clarence in Alaska and at two sites on the Chukotka peninsula (the village of Nunyamo and Penkigney Bay) on the eastern coast of Siberia. These specimens were collected during the first successful navigation of the Northeast Passage, completed by the Vega expedition led by the Nordic explorer Adolf Erik Nordenskjöld aboard the SS Vega. These specimens and other type material in the form of slides are deposited in the Natural History Museum in Vienna.

In 1919, the American biologist Ralph V. Chamberlain described Cryophilus alaskanus as a new species based on two specimens collected in 1916 from the tundra near Nome in Alaska. In 1946, Chamberlain reported the collection of another specimen in 1945 in College near Fairbanks in Alaska. He also deemed C. alaskanus to be a junior synonym of A. glacialis. Authorities now consider these centipedes to be the same species.

In 2022, David W. Langor and Stephen D. Langor reported the discovery of more than 20 specimens in Canada. These centipedes were recently identified as specimens of A. glacialis by the American myriapodologist Ralph E. Crabill, Jr. These specimens were collected at Reindeer Station in the Northwest Territories by the Canadian zoologist John R. Vockeroth in 1948 and represent the first record of this species in Canada.

== Etymology ==
The genus name Arctogeophilus comes from Ancient Greek ἄρκτος (árktos), meaning "bear," γεω- (geo-), meaning "earth," and φίλος (phílos), meaning "lover." The specific epithet glacialis comes from Latin glacies, meaning "ice." The names allude to the cold habitat and northern range of this centipede, in the direction of the Ursa Major constellation.

== Description ==
This species features 39 pairs of legs in each sex and can reach 20 mm in length and 1.2 mm in breadth. This centipede has a yellow or reddish yellow body with the head more reddish brown than the body. The first maxillae feature relatively short lappets projecting from the lateral margins. The forcipules feature denticles on all articles, with the denticles on the second and third articles only slightly shorter than those on the first and ultimate articles. The sterna lack ventral fields of pores, and each of the ultimate legs lacks a claw or pretarsus at the tip.

This species shares many traits with other Arctogeophilus species. For example, centipedes in this genus usually lack ventral pore-fields and feature no pretarsus on the ultimate legs. Like other species in this genus, A. glacialis features an elongate head, with a cephalic plate that is noticeably longer than wide. Furthermore, the labrum in this genus features side pieces that nearly touch in the middle, making the intermediate part inconspicuous. In A. glacialis, the intermediate part of the labrum is covered by the side pieces, which meet in the middle.

Three other Arctogeophilus species found in Russia, A. attemsi, A. macrocephalus, and A. sachalinus, are so similar to A. glacialis that some authors have suggested that these three may be junior synonyms of A. glacialis. The species A. glacialis may be distinguished from these close relatives, however, by the lappets on the first maxillae, the denticles on the forcipular articles, and the absence of ventral pore-fields. Whereas the first maxillary lappets are short in A. glacialis, they are long in the other three species. Furthermore, denticles are present on the second and third articles of the forcipule in A. glacialis, whereas these denticles are absent in A. attemsi and A. sachalinus. Moreover, ventral pore fields appear on some anterior segments in A. macrocephalus and A. sachalinus but are entirely absent in A. glacialis.
