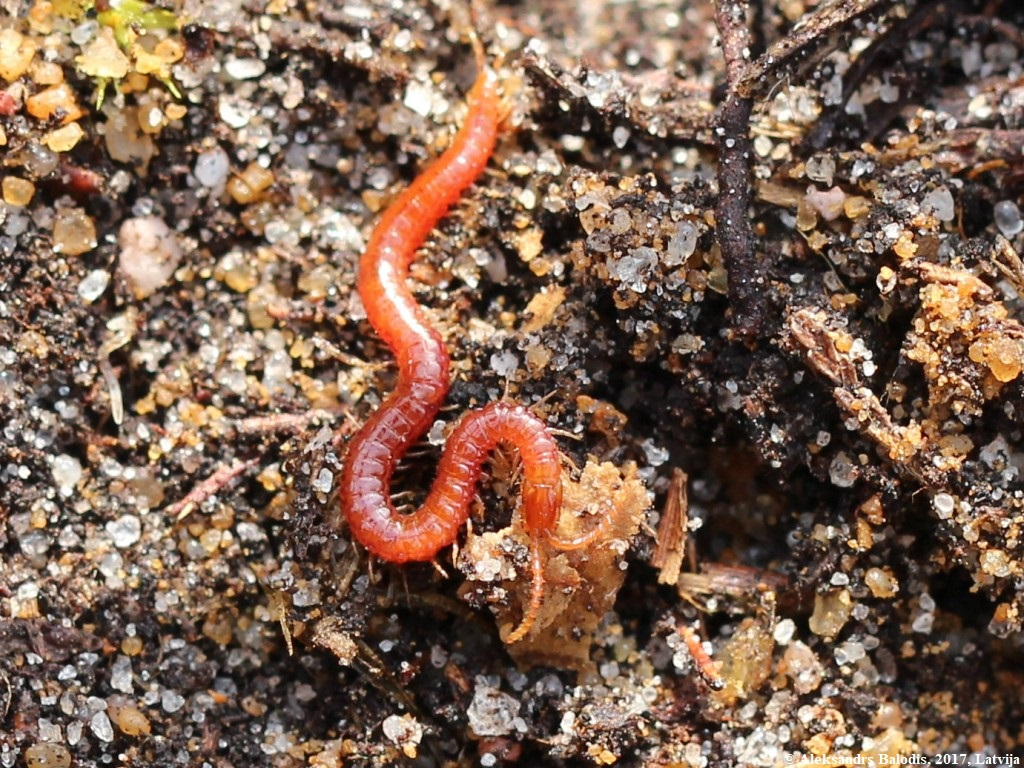
- Pachymerium ferrugineum

Scientific classification
- Kingdom: Animalia
- Phylum: Arthropoda
- Subphylum: Myriapoda
- Class: Chilopoda
- Order: Geophilomorpha
- Family: Geophilidae
- Genus: Pachymerium; C. L. Koch, 1847

Type species
- Geophilus ferrugineum C.L. Koch, 1835

Synonyms
- Pachymerium (Eupachymerium) Attems, 1909; Geophilus (Khroumiriophilus) Attems, 1908

= Pachymerium =

Genus of centipedes

Pachymerium is a genus of soil centipedes in the family Geophilidae. This genus contains more than 20 species. These centipedes are found mainly in the west Palearctic region and in south Africa.

== Description ==
Centipedes in this genus feature an elongated head with an intermediate part of the labrum separating the side pieces. Each of the second maxillae ends in a claw. The forcipular tergite is distinctly narrower than the following tergite. The posterior part of the forcipular coxosternite is broad. The first article of the forcipule is elongated and features a distal denticle, and the ultimate article features a prominent basal denticle. Fields of pores appear on at least the anterior sternites, with pores in a pair of anterior groups and a posterior transverse band. The sternite of the last leg-bearing segment is either about as long as wide or longer. The basal element of each of the ultimate legs features scattered pores, and each of these legs ends in a claw.

These centipedes range from about 2 cm to about 8 cm in length and have 37 to 79 pairs of legs. The Chilean species Pachymerium armatum measures only 20 mm in length and has only 37 leg pairs, the minimum number recorded in this genus. The Russian species P. minutum is also notable for its small size (only 17 mm in length) and its modest number of legs (39 pairs in each sex). The Portuguese species P. coiffaiti is notable for its large size (males reaching 58 mm in length, females ranging from 70 mm to 85 mm) and many legs (males with 69 pairs, females with 73 or 75). The Cuban species P. cubanum and the large Turkish species P. serratum (measuring 50 mm and 78 mm in length, respectively) each can have as many as 79 leg pairs, the maximum number recorded in this genus.

== Phylogeny ==
A phylogenetic analysis of the order Geophilomorpha using both molecular data and morphology places a representative of the genus Pachymerium (P. ferrugineum) in a clade with a representative of Schendyloides, another genus in the family Geophilidae. This phylogenetic tree suggests that the genera Pachymerium and Schendyloides are more closely related to one another than any other genera included in this analysis. These two close relatives form a sister group for another clade formed by representatives of two more genera in the same family, Arctogeophilus and Alloschizotaenia, which emerge as the next closest relatives included in this analysis.

== Species ==
This genus contains the following species:

- Pachymerium antipai Capuse, 1968
- Pachymerium armatum Silvestri, 1905
- Pachymerium attenuatum (Say)
- Pachymerium brevicornis (Lucas, 1849)
- Pachymerium capense Attems, 1947
- Pachymerium caucasicum Attems, 1903
- Pachymerium coiffaiti Demange, 1959
- Pachymerium cubanum Matic et al., 1977
- Pachymerium dragani Capuse, 1975
- Pachymerium escherichi (Verhoeff)
- Pachymerium ferrugineum (C. L. Koch, 1835)
- Pachymerium folkmanovae (Dobroruka, 1966)
- Pachymerium grandiceps (Porat, 1893)
- Pachymerium idium Chamberlin, 1960
- Pachymerium imbricatum Attems, 1934
- Pachymerium minutum (Seliwanoff, 1884)
- Pachymerium monticola Muralewicz, 1926
- Pachymerium multipes (Sseliwanoff, 1881)
- Pachymerium pereirai Shear & Peck, 1992
- Pachymerium pilosum (Meinert, 1870)
- Pachymerium rioindianum Matic et al., 1977
- Pachymerium serratum Verhoeff, 1943
- Pachymerium syriacum Attems, 1903
- Pachymerium tabacarui Capuse, 1968
- Pachymerium tridentatum Lawrence, 1960
- Pachymerium tristanicum Attems, 1928
- Pachymerium tyrrhenum Verhoeff, 1934
- Pachymerium zelandicum Attems, 1947
