= Alloschizotaenia bipora =

Scientific classification
- Kingdom: Animalia
- Phylum: Arthropoda
- Subphylum: Myriapoda
- Class: Chilopoda
- Order: Geophilomorpha
- Family: Geophilidae
- Genus: Alloschizotaenia
- Species: A. bipora

Binomial name
- Alloschizotaenia bipora Attems, 1952

Species of centipede

Alloschizotaenia bipora is a species of soil centipede in the family Geophilidae. This centipede is found in Rwanda and the Democratic Republic of the Congo. This species features 39 pairs of legs in each sex and can reach 18 mm in length.

== Discovery and distribution ==
This species was first described in 1952 by the Austrian myriapodologist Carl Attems. He based the original description of this species on several syntypes, including nine males, five females, and one juvenile, collected by the Belgian zoologist Narcisse Leleup in the Rugege forest in Rwanda in 1951. The syntypes are deposited in the Natural History Museum in Vienna. In 1958, the Czech myriapodologist Luděk .J. Dobroruka reported the discovery of six specimens of A. bipora (four males and two females) collected by the Austrian zoologist Herbert Franz in 1954 in the town of Yangambi in the Democratic Republic of the Congo.

== Description ==
This species features 39 leg pairs in both sexes and can reach 18 mm in length. The name of the species refers to the two large pores on the basal element of each of the ultimate legs. These pores appear either below or next to the corresponding sternite.

The head is longer than wide and adorned with scattered bristles. Four bristles at the very front of the clypeus are clearly visible under a microscope. Five short denticles appear on the posterior margin of the middle of the labrum; the posterior margins of the side parts of the labrum are fringed with fine bristles. The first maxillae feature two distinct articles, with a long thin projection extending from the lateral margin of the basal article. This projection extends next to the distal article and reaches almost as far as the distal article does. Two denticles appear on the first article of the forcipule, with the distal denticle more prominent than the basal denticle. The ultimate article of the forcipule features a prominent basal denticle. The sternites are wider than long and sparsely adorned with small bristles. The sternites feature no ventral pores. Each of the ultimate legs ends in a small elongated article with fine bristles. The ultimate legs of the male are only slightly thicker than those of the female.

This species shares many traits with the other two species in the genus Alloschizotaenia. For example, like the other species in this genus, this species features an elongated head, sternites without ventral pores, and ultimate legs with a few pores close to the sternite. Furthermore, each of the ultimate legs in A. bipora ends in a tubercle with bristles rather than in a claw, as do the ultimate legs in the other species in this genus.

Other features distinguish A. bipora from the other two Alloschizotaenia species, A. minuta and A. occidentalis. For example, the clypeus in A. bipora features only four bristles at the very front. The clypeus in A. minuta features not only four bristles near the anterior edge but also a transverse row of four bristles behind the first set of bristles. Similarly, the clypeus in A. occidentalis features a transverse row of small bristles behind a set of four bristles. Furthermore, the inner margin of the first article of the forcipule features a proximal tubercle as well as a distal tooth in A. bipora but only the distal tooth in A. minuta and only a small distal tubercle in A. occidentalis.

The only other Alloschizotaenia species found in central Africa, A. occidentalis, may also be distinguished from A. bipora based on other features. For example, each of the first maxillae in A. bipora features a projection on the basal article, whereas this projection is absent in A. occidentalis. Furthermore, where each of the ultimate legs in A. bipora has only two pores, A. occidentalis has three pores.
