= Hoplophryne rogersi =

Conservation status
- Endangered (IUCN 3.1)

Scientific classification
- Kingdom: Animalia
- Phylum: Chordata
- Class: Amphibia
- Order: Anura
- Family: Microhylidae
- Genus: Hoplophryne
- Species: H. rogersi

Binomial name
- Hoplophryne rogersi Barbour and Loveridge, 1928

Species of amphibian

Hoplophryne rogersi, also known as the Tanzania banana frog, Usambara banana frog, Usambara blue-bellied frog, and Roger's three-fingered frog, is a species of frog in the family Microhylidae. It is endemic to north-eastern Tanzania and known from the Usambara, Magrotto, and Nguru Mountains of Tanga Region. The specific name rogersi honours F. W. Rogers, the custodian of the Amani Research Institute at the time of the describers' visit to Usambara.

== Description ==
Males grow to 26 mm (1.0 in) and females to 32 mm (1.3 in) in snout–vent length. The body is stout. Males have only three fingers as the thumb is reduced to a stump with a sharp, protruding bone. No webbing is present. The dorsum is smooth with small spines; there are larger spines on the throat, lips, chest, and limbs. The dorsum is slate-blue to grey-brown. A darker stripe runs from the snout to along the side of the body to the knee. The legs have dark crossbars. The underside is black with blue or white vermiculations.

== Habitat and conservation ==
Hoplophryne rogersi occurs in lowland and montane forest at elevations of 180–1,200 m (590–3,940 ft) above sea level, perhaps higher. It is active in leaf litter by day. It can be found in moderately disturbed habitats, but not in heavily disturbed forest or in open areas. Although generally rare and difficult to find outside the breeding season, it is easily found in the Amani Botanic Garden where it uses the extensive stands of exotic bamboo for breeding. The eggs are laid in phytotelmata: hollow bamboo stems, leaf axils, and tree holes. The larvae develop in these same microhabitats.

Hoplophryne rogersi is likely negatively affected by ongoing forest loss and degradation. It occurs in several, relatively well-protected areas.
