= Muheza District =

District of Tanga Region, Tanzania

Muheza District Wilaya ya Muheza (Swahili)
- District of Tanga
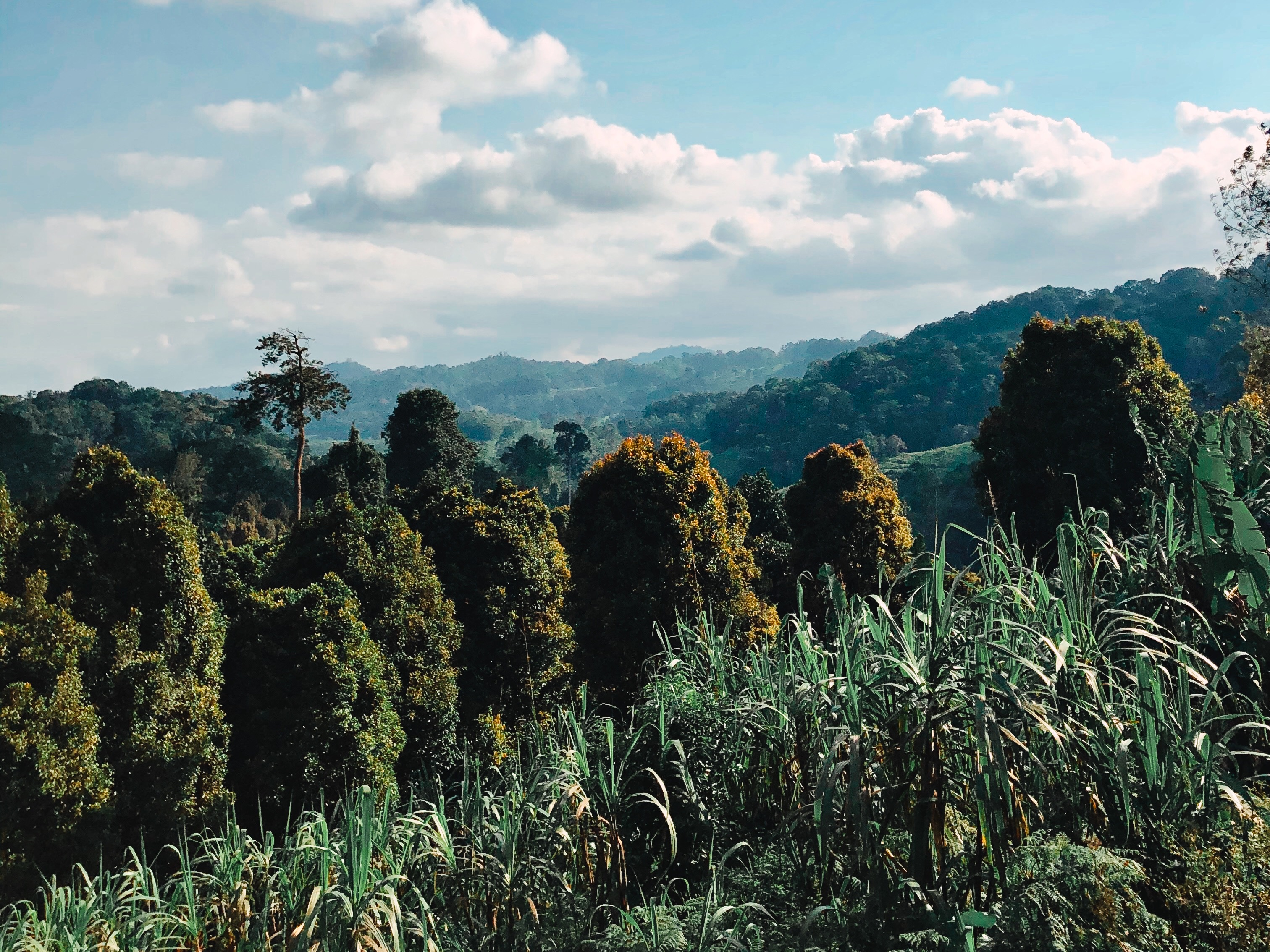
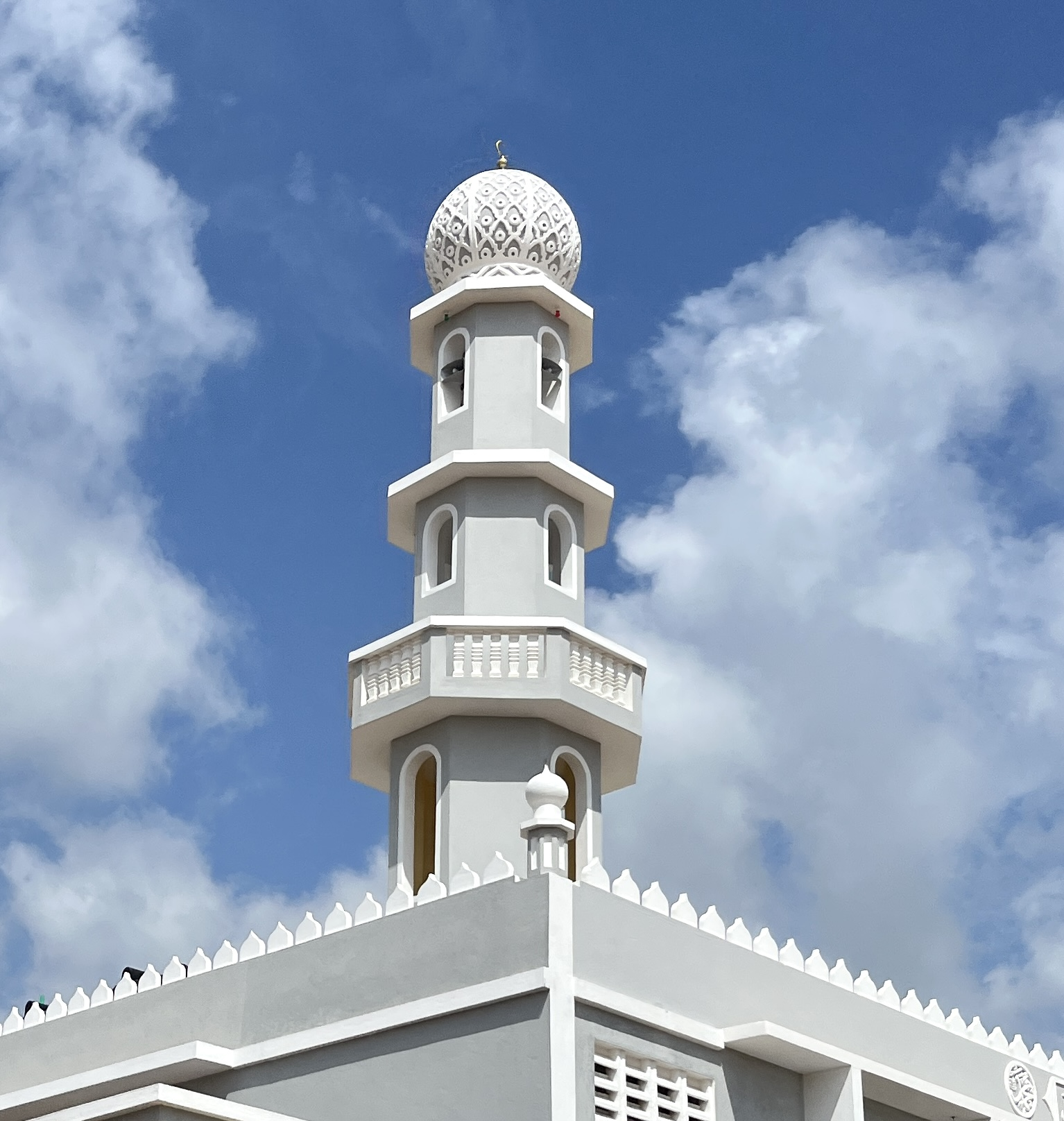
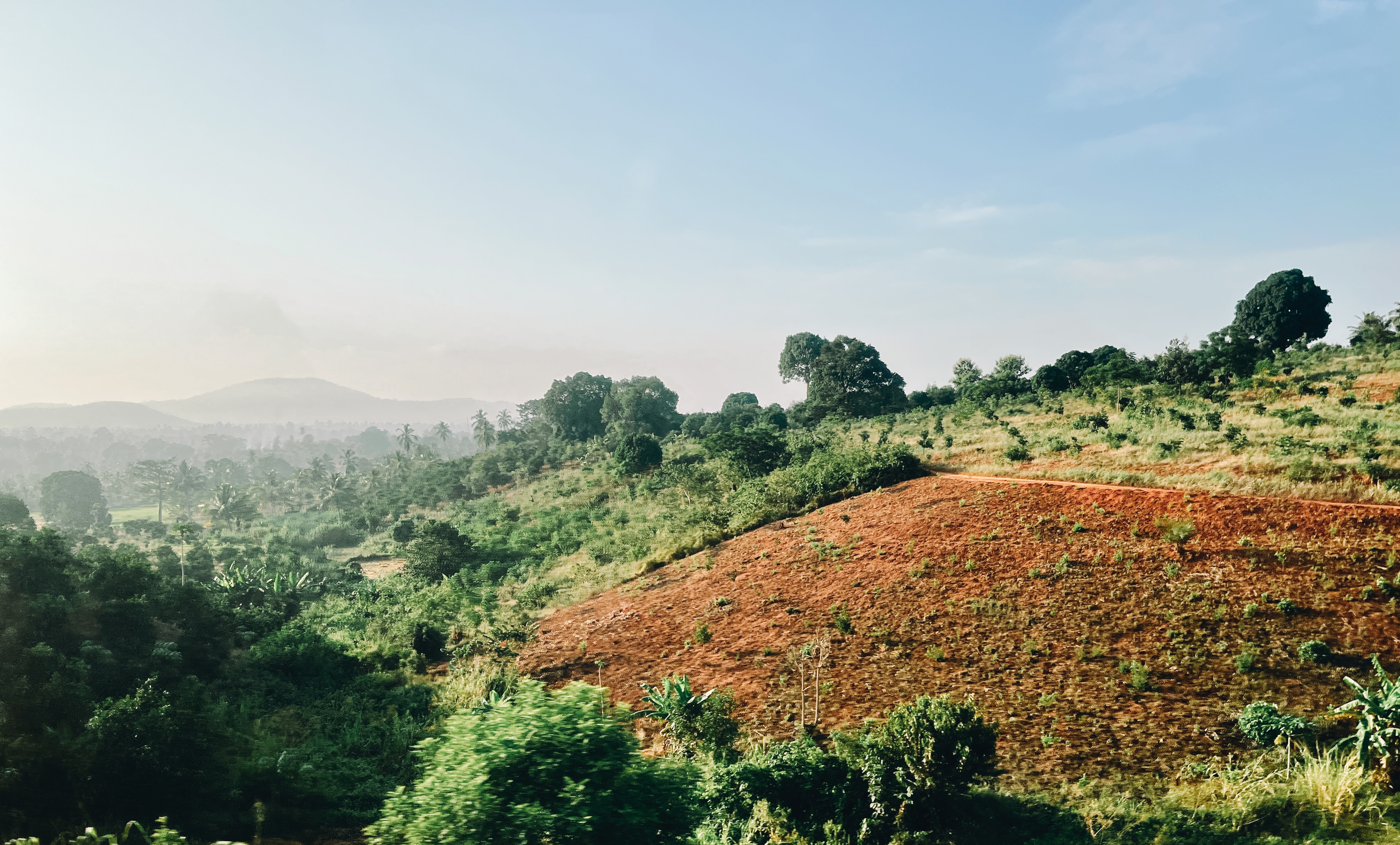
- From top to bottom: Clove trees in Kisiwani ward of Muheza District, Kigombe Mosque in Kigombe ward, Muheza & Kwafungo Ward landscape
- Nickname: The Jewel of Tanga
- Muheza District in Tanga
- Coordinates: 5°12′25.56″S 38°44′12.48″E
- Country: Tanzania
- Region: Tanga Region
- Named for: Muheza town
- Capital: Muheza

Area
  - Total: 1,498 km^{2} (578 sq mi)
  - Rank: 7th in Tanga
- Highest elevation (Kimbo Peak): 1,063 m (3,488 ft)

Population (2022)
  - Total: 238,260
  - Rank: 6th in Tanga
  - Density: 159.1/km^{2} (411.9/sq mi)

Ethnic groups
  - Settler: Swahili
  - Native: Bondei, Dhaiso, Sambaa & Zigua
- Time zone: UTC+3 (EAT)
- Tanzanian Postcode: 214
- Website: Official website
- Symbols of Tanzania
- Bird: Amani sunbird
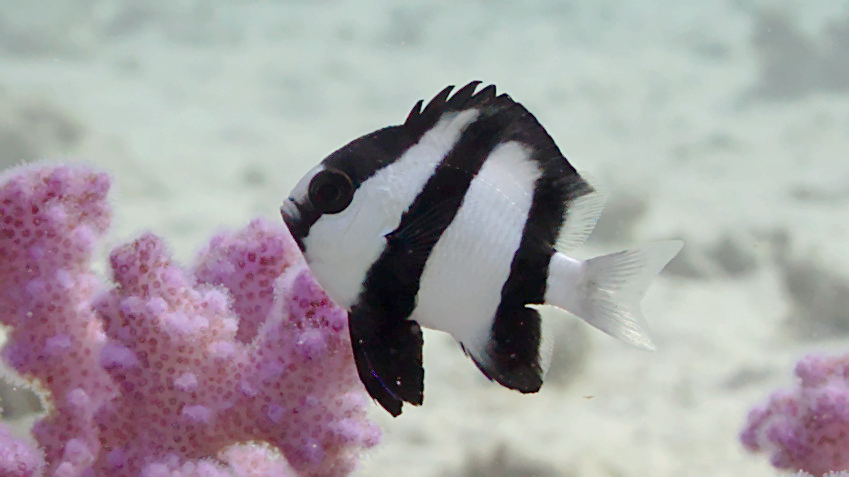
- Fish: Whitetail dascyllus
- Mammal: African black shrew

Muheza District, officially the, Muheza District Council (Wilaya ya Muheza, in Swahili) is one of eleven administrative districts of Tanga Region in Tanzania. The District covers an area of 1,498 km^{2} (578 sq mi). It is bordered to the north by Mkinga District, to the east by Tanga and the Indian Ocean, to the south by the Pangani District and Handeni District, and to the west by the Korogwe District. The district is comparable in size to the land area of Guadeloupe. The town of Muheza, after which the district is named, serves as its administrative capital. According to the 2012 Tanzania National Census, the population of Muheza District had decreased to 238,260; this is less than ten years before, because Mkinga District was created that same year. The highest point in Muheza District is Kimbo Peak at 1,063m.

== Administrative subdivisions ==
Muheza District Council is one of Tanga Region's eleven councils in terms of administration. It is divided into Amani, Bwembwera, Ngomneni, and Muheza divisions. The council consists of 135 villages, 522 hamlets, and 37 wards.

=== Wards ===
As of 2012, Muheza District is administratively divided into 33 wards:

1. Amani
2. Bwembwera
3. Genge
4. Kicheba
5. Kigombe
6. Kilulu
7. Kisiwani
8. Kwafungo
9. Kwakifua
10. Kwemkabala
1. Lusanga
2. Magila
3. Magoroto
4. Majengo
5. Masuguru
6. Mbaramo
7. Mbomole
8. Mhamba
9. Misalai
1. Misozwe
2. Mkuzi
3. Mlingano
4. Mpapayu
5. Mtindiro
6. Ngomeni
7. Nkumba
8. Pande Darajani
1. Potwe
2. Songa
3. Tanganyika
4. Tingeni
5. Tongwe
6. Zirai

== Geography ==
The District is located between 4° 54' 18" S latitude and 38° 55' 23" L longitude.The 1,497 square kilometer E. Muheza District Council makes up around 7.0 percent of the 28,055 square kilometer Tanga Region's total land area. The Kwafungo ward has the largest surface area (110 km^{2}; 7.4%), followed by Kigombe ward (98 km^{2}; 6.6%) and Amani ward (91 km^{2}; 6.1%). The ward with the smallest surface area, nevertheless, was Masuguru, at 0.8 square kilometers (0.1%). However, the majority of the council's surface area (1,483.6 km^{2}; 99.1%) is made up of land, and only 13 km^{2} (0.9%) of it is water in the Kigombe ward. The district is traversed by the Pangani River and the Sigi River.

=== Climate ===
The Muheza region has a tropical climate. The wettest month is February, with an average rainfall of only 40 mm, and the wettest season has substantially more rain. The most precipitation occurs in April, when there is an average of 199 mm. There is a 159 mm difference in rainfall between the wettest and driest months. The maximum average temperature is 27.2 °C in February. July is the coldest month of the year, averaging 22.8 °C. The Usambara mountains, with their highlands and foothills, have an impact on the climate in Muheza DC.

== Economy ==
=== Infrastructure ===
Trunk, regional, district, and feeder roads all provide service to Muheza District Council. There was a total road network of 932 km in 2015, broken down into ward and type lengths. Roads that are maintained by the district council are known as district or feeder roads, while those that are maintained by the central government are categorized as trunk or regional roads. The remaining roads are known as feeder or peripheral roads, and the majority of them are maintained by village/mitaa communities. On average, trunk roads made up 45 kilometers (4.8%) of the entire road network. District roads were 246 kilometers long (26.4%), while regional roads were 122 kilometers long (13.1%). A total of 519 kilometers, or 55.7%, were made up by feeder roads.

Paved trunk road T13 from Segera to Tanga and the Kenyan border passes through the district. The Tanga-Arusha Railway passes through the district as well.

=== Agriculture ===
For the citizens of Muheza District Council, agriculture remained their main source of income. More over 79 percent of households in the council were engaged in agriculture, according to the 2012 Population and Housing Census. Maize, cassava, and bananas are the main food crops produced by Muheza District Council, while oranges, coconuts, black pepper, cloves, cinnamon, and tea are grown as commercial crops. To boost their salaries, however, some council members grow food crops as cash crops.

After natural resources, livestock is the third most significant economic activity for the people of Muheza District Council. According to the 2012 Population and Housing Census, a total of 21,821 households in the council kept cattle, or 45.8% of all households in the council. In 2015, the Muheza District Council had a total of 302,484 livestock. The most prevalent livestock was chicken, with 230,070 (76.1%) populations, followed by goats (37,409; 12.4%), and cattle (27,999; 9.3%). The three types of livestock with the lowest population density were donkeys (212, or 0.1%), pigs (2,688, or 0.9%), and sheep (4,106, or 1.4%).

=== Natural resources ===
Forestry potential is another gift to Muheza District Council. To meet the demand for fire wood, charcoal, timber, and building materials, the Muheza forests are overexploited. To avoid the effects of excessive deforestation, efforts have been made to conserve some woods. As of now, the council has natural forest reserves spanning 30,127 hectares and forest plantations covering 11,273 hectares, for a total forest cover of 41,400 hectares encircled by 16 wards.

=== Fishing ===
Due to the scarcity of water bodies in Muheza DC, fishing is not a common economic activity. Only individuals who were organized into a group and started fishing ventures in the Indian Ocean engage in small-scale fishing in one ward. In 2015, there were 256 fishermen in the Kigombe ward of the council, and 185 of them (72.3 percent) possessed fishing licenses. The council, on the other hand, possessed 167 vessels, of which more than half—97 (58.1 percent)—are registered and 70 (41.9 percent) are not. Additionally, the council produced 50,654 kg of fish valued 174.8 million in total in 2015.

=== Mining ===
Sands are a type of mineral deposit that is found in minor quantities in Ngomeni ward and is accessible to the district council. About 4,200,000 kg of sand, worth TZS 16,800,000, are extracted by the council in 2015. However, in comparison to other productive industries like agriculture and cattle, its economic impact on the council is still insignificant.

=== Tourism ===
The Muheza District Council is blessed with historical and nature sites that have a lot of potential for attracting tourists for cultural travel. The historic sites are underdeveloped, however the natural sites are open to the public. The Amani, Magoroto and NILO Forest Reserves, as well as Kigombe Beach, are among the tourist sites that the Muheza District Council's citizens and visitors can visit.

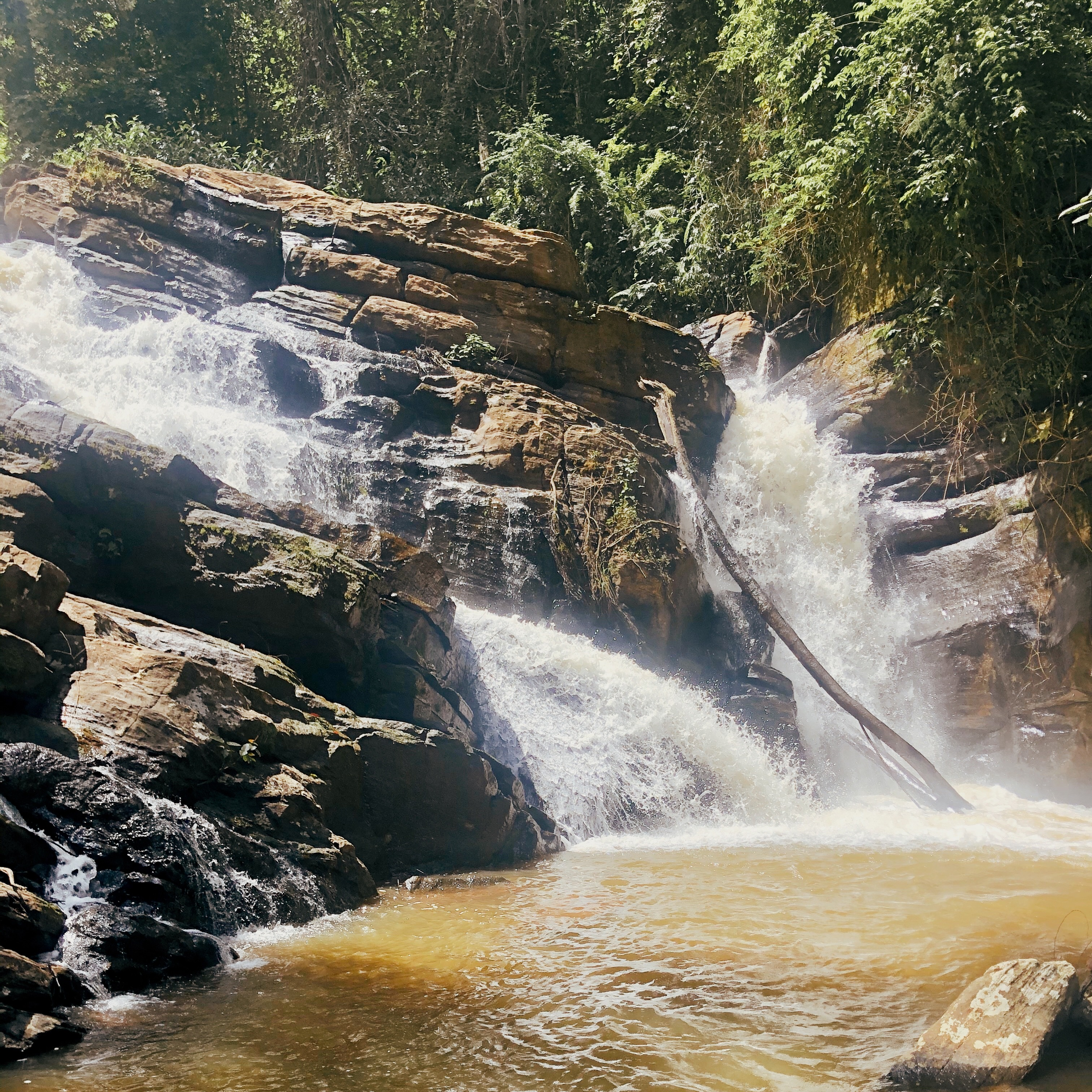
Derema Falls, Kisiwani Ward, Muheza

== Population ==
The Bondei, Sambaa, and Zigua are the three main indigenous ethnic groups represented in Muheza District Council, which had a population of 204,461 as per the 2012 Population and Housing Census. The Bondei and Sambaa are the two largest ethnic groups in the council, making up more than 80% of the Muheza population and engaging primarily in agriculture. Within the council, there are few and dispersed Zigua groups.

=== Demographics ===
Muheza District Council saw a population gain of 32,893 people (19.2 percent) between 2002 and 2012, going from 171,568 to 204,461. Males saw a growth of 14,692 people, or 17.1 percent, from 86,151 in 2002 to 100,843 in 2012, while females saw an increase of 18,201 people, or 21.3 percent, from 85,417 in 2002 to 103,618 in 2012. In 2012, Muheza DC had a share of the regional population of 10.0 percent across the councils.

== Education and health ==
=== Education ===
In 2011, Muheza District Council has 4 private primary schools in addition to 111 public primary schools. The number of private primary schools increased from 4 in 2011 to 7 in 2015, while the number of public primary schools in the council stayed the same. With five public elementary schools apiece, Bwembwera, Kilulu, Lusanga, and Ngomeni Wards led the pack at the ward level, while Kwabada, Kwemingoji, and Masuguru Wards had the fewest (2 each). From 2011 to 2015, a five-year span, neither the number of public secondary schools in Muheza District Council increased nor decreased.Genge and Mlingano Wards had the most public secondary schools per ward (2). Except for Majengo Ward, which lacked a public secondary school, the remaining wards each had one.

=== Health ===
There were 47 medical facilities within Muheza District Council. Only one private hospital, two public and two private health clinics, and 44 public dispensaries were located inside the Tanganyika Ward of the council. However, there was only one health center per ward, with Misalai, Mkuzi, Mbaramo, and Genge being the exceptions. With two public dispensaries each, Mtindiro, Kwafungo, Zirai, Misalai, and Kisiwani were the most fortunate wards. Amani and Kigombe wards each had 3 dispensaries (one public and two private), and Kisiwani and Misalai wards each had 3 dispensaries (2 public and one private). Ideally, there is a health center in every ward of the council.
