= Hoplophryne =

Scientific classification
- Kingdom: Animalia
- Phylum: Chordata
- Class: Amphibia
- Order: Anura
- Family: Microhylidae
- Subfamily: Hoplophryninae
- Genus: Hoplophryne; Barbour and Loveridge, 1928

Type species
- Hoplophryne uluguruensis Barbour and Loveridge, 1928

Species
- 2 species (see text)

Genus of amphibians

Hoplophryne is a genus of microhylid frogs. The genus is endemic to mountain forests of Tanzania. They are also known as three-fingered frogs or African banana frogs (not to be confused with Afrixalus, another African genus known as "banana frogs").

== Species ==
There are two species in this genus, both endangered:

- Hoplophryne rogersi Barbour and Loveridge, 1928
- Hoplophryne uluguruensis Barbour and Loveridge, 1928

== Description ==
Hoplophryne are small frogs, reaching 32 mm (1.3 in) in snout–vent length (female H. rogersi). Their distinctive characters is that male frogs have only three fingers: the thumb is reduced to a small bump or group of spines.

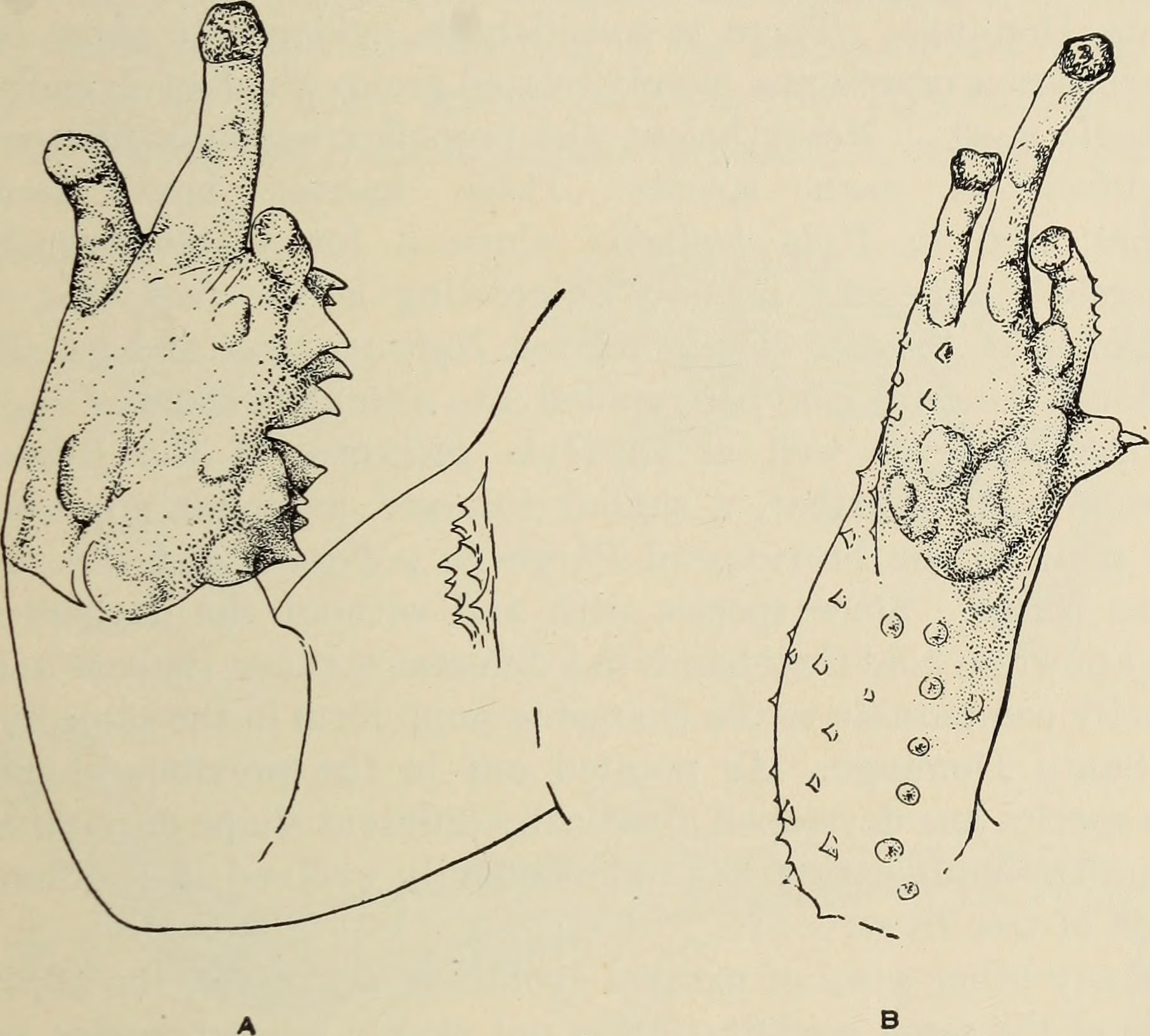
The forelimb of the male Hoplophryne uluguruensis (left) and H. rogersi (right) showing the reduced thumb.

== Ecology and reproduction ==
Hoplophryne can be found in leaf litter, under logs, and in bananas and bamboos. Reproduction takes place in phytotelmata. The modified thumbs of males are probably involved in mating, helping the male to embrace the female.
