= Magoroto =

Ward in Muheza District, Tanga Region

Kisiwani Kata ya Kisiwani (Swahili)
- Ward of Muheza District
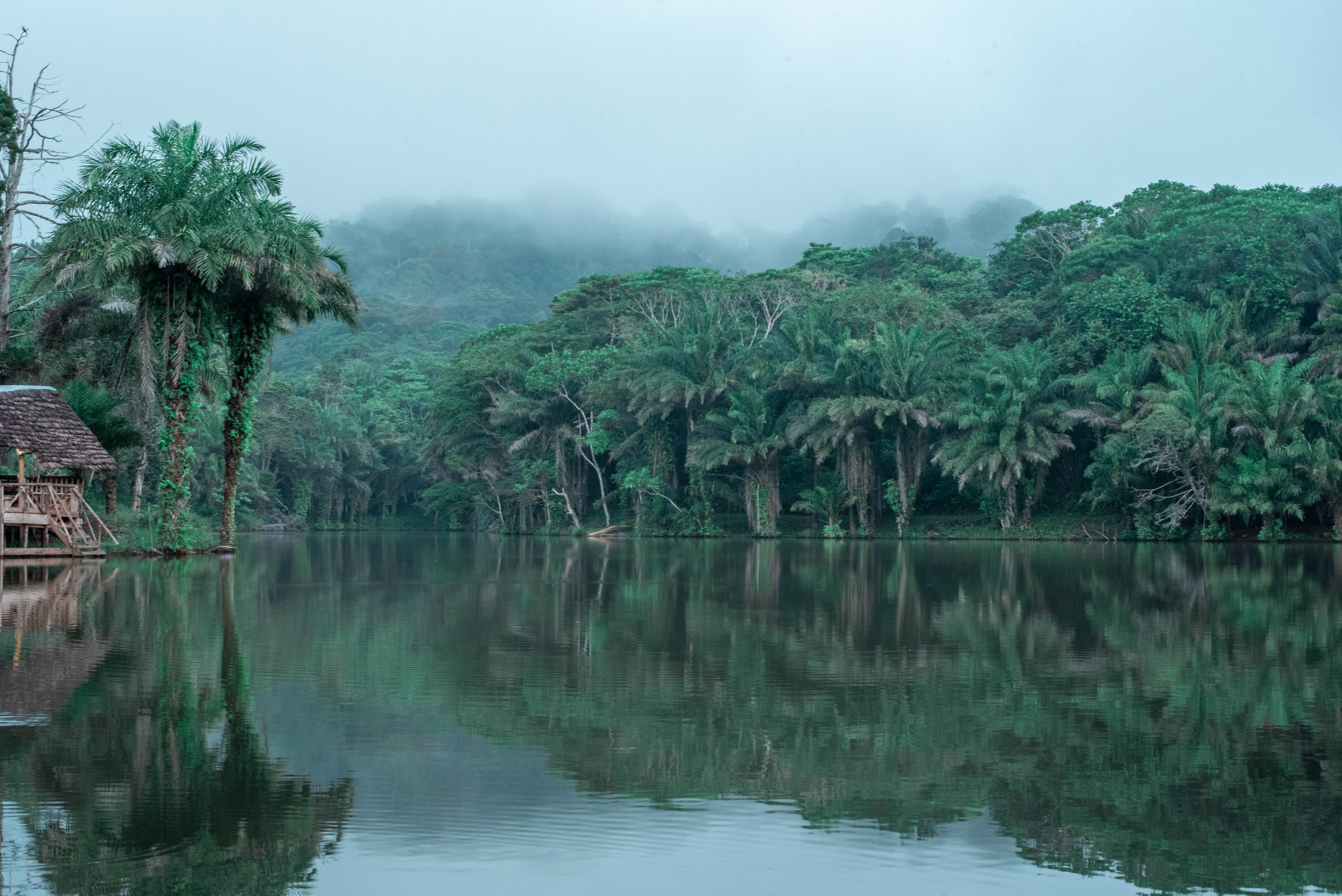
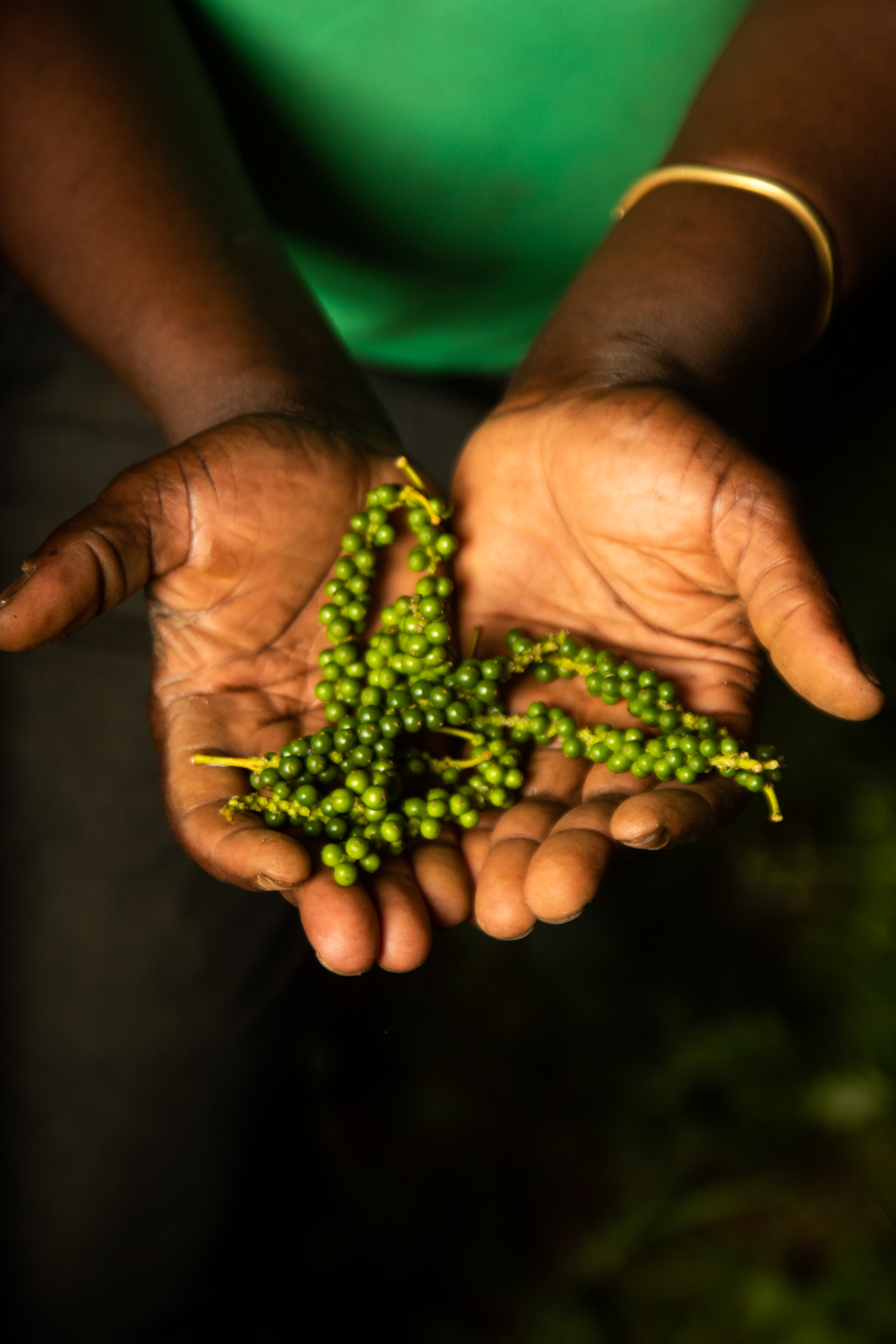
- From top to bottom: Magoroto Forest scene in Magoroto ward & Black pepper in farmer's hands in Magoroto
- Interactive map of Kisiwani
- Coordinates: 5°6′30.24″S 38°44′37.32″E
- Country: Tanzania
- Region: Tanga Region
- District: Muheza District

Area
  - Total: 38 km^{2} (15 sq mi)

Population (2012)
  - Total: 5,769

Ethnic groups
  - Settler: Swahili & Shambaa
  - Ancestral: Bondei
- Tanzanian Postal Code: 21414

Magoroto (Kata ya Magoroto, in Swahili) is an administrative ward in Muheza District of Tanga Region in Tanzania. It is bordered to the north by Misozwe, to the east by Kicheba, to the south by Magila and Nkumba, and to the west by Tongwe. The ward covers an area of 38 km^{2} (15 sq mi), and has an average elevation of 309 m (1,014 ft). According to the 2012 census, the ward had a total population of 5,769.

== Administration ==
The postal code for Magoroto Ward is 21414. The ward is divided into the following neighborhoods (Mitaa):

- 398 Kelugundi
- Bamba Masoloko
- Bombo
- Gare
- Jego
- Jeila
- Kisiwani
- Kivindo
- Kwasimba
- Kweale
- Kwedibo

- Kwekanta
- Kwemainde
- Kwemdui
- Kwemnazi
- Kwemtambuu
- Kweng'washa
- Kweshai
- Kwetete
- Kwezevu
- Mabejani
- Magomba

- Magomba Kwemainde
- Magula
- Kwetete
- Mambomsije
- Manga
- Mdote
- Mgambo
- Misufini

- Mkungu
- Mwembeni
- Mwembeni "A"
- Mwembeni "B"
- Seluka
- Ubiri

=== Government ===
The ward, like every other ward in the country, has local government offices based on the population served.The Magoroto Ward administration building houses a court as per the Ward Tribunal Act of 1988, including other vital departments for the administration the ward. The ward has the following administration offices:

- Magoroto Police Station
- Magoroto Government Office (Afisa Mtendaji)
- Magoroto Tribunal (Baraza La Kata) is a Department inside Ward Government Office

In the local government system of Tanzania, the ward is the smallest democratic unit. Each ward is composed of a committee of eight elected council members which include a chairperson, one salaried officer (with no voting rights), and an executive officer. One-third of seats are reserved for women councillors.

== Demographics ==
Like much of the district, the ward is the ancestral home of the Bondei people.

== Education and health ==
=== Education ===
The ward is home to these educational institutions:

- Mwembeni Primary School
- Gare Primary School
- Mgambo Primary School
- Magula Primary School
- Mlinga Secondary School

=== Healthcare ===
The ward is home to the following health institutions:

- Mwembeni dispensary
