= Parhoplophryne =

Parhoplophryne usambarica

Conservation status
- Critically endangered, possibly extinct (IUCN 3.1)

Scientific classification
- Kingdom: Animalia
- Phylum: Chordata
- Class: Amphibia
- Order: Anura
- Family: Microhylidae
- Subfamily: Hoplophryninae
- Genus: Parhoplophryne; Barbour and Loveridge, 1928
- Species: P. usambarica

Binomial name
- Parhoplophryne usambarica Barbour and Loveridge, 1928

Synonyms
- Parhoplophryne usambaricus Barbour and Loveridge, 1928

Genus of amphibians

Parhoplophryne is a monotypic frog genus in the family Microhylidae. The sole species is Parhoplophryne usambarica, sometimes known as the Usambara black-banded frog or Amani forest frog. It is endemic to the East Usambara Mountains in Tanzania. It is only known from one specimen collected in the 1920s and is feared to be extinct.

== Description ==
This species is only known from the holotype, a juvenile female that measured 23 mm (0.91 in) in snout–vent length. In addition, a series of tadpoles were also collected, but it is uncertain whether they belong to this species or Hoplophryne rogersi.

The holotype had a moderately stout general appearance, with a small head, acuminate snout, and smallmouth. No tympanum is present. The fingers and toes were without any webbing. The skin was perfectly smooth (i.e., without any spinosities) but with rugose folds. Colouration was very similar to Hoplophryne rogersi, which is slatey-blue above, shading to blue-grey peripherally. A white band was running from the eye to the base of the fore limb. The underside was white, blotched, and spotted with dark brown.

== Habitat and conservation ==
The holotype was collected in a wild banana (Ensete) on a forested hill to the west of Amani, at approximately 900 m (3,000 ft) above sea level. Other information on the species' habitat and ecology is not available.

Considering that many surveys were undertaken in the area, without positive records, and the extent of habitat loss in the area (first by tea plantations and at present by small-scale agriculture), it is possible that this species is extinct. Theoretically, it might be present in the Amani Nature Reserve, although intensive sampling has not revealed any specimens.
