= Amani, Muheza =

Ward in Muheza District, Tanga Region

Amani Kata ya Amani (Swahili)
- Ward of Muheza District
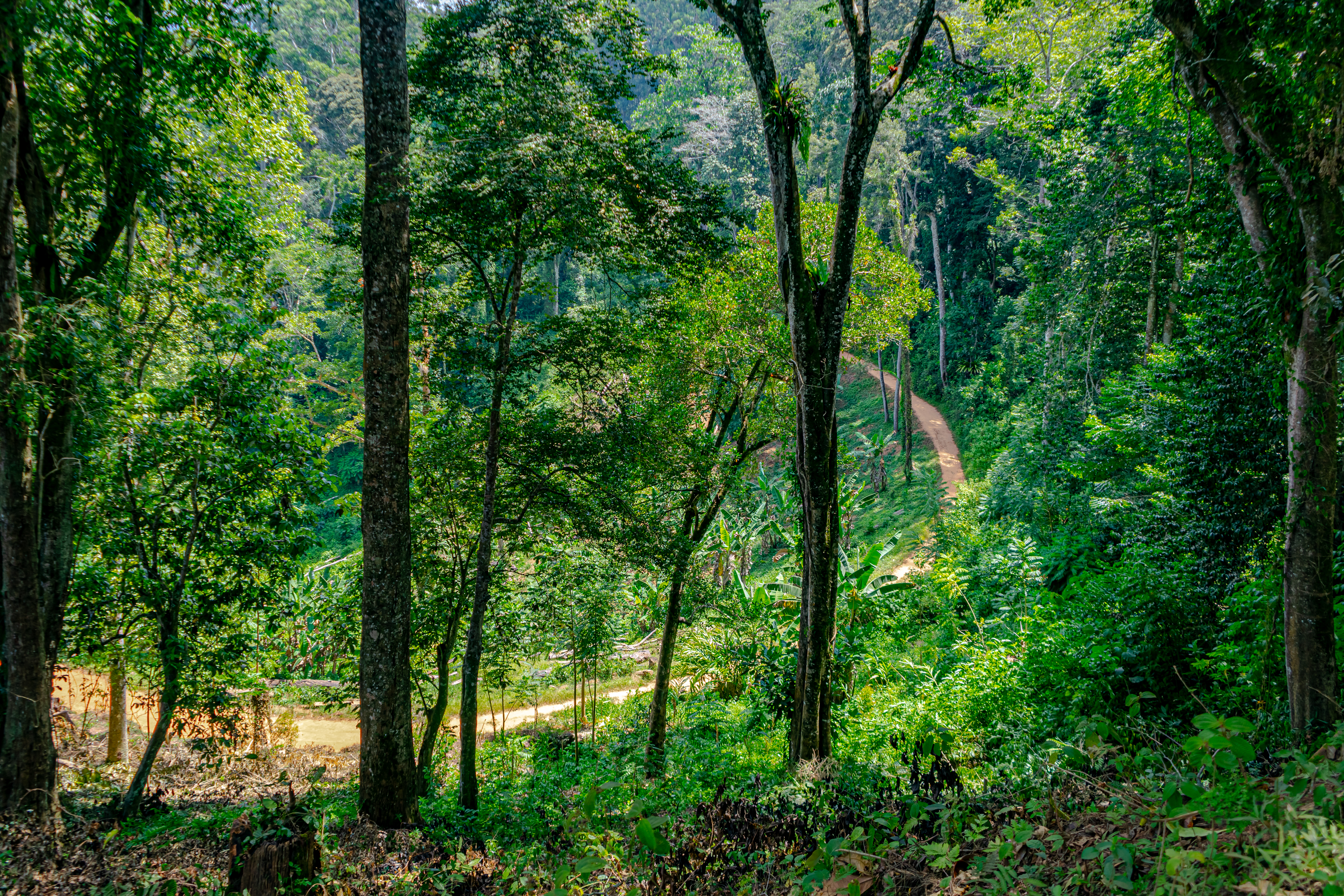
- Amani Forest Nature Reserve covers the Amani ward
- Interactive map of Amani
- Coordinates: 5°6′0″S 38°37′59.88″E
- Country: Tanzania
- Region: Tanga Region
- District: Muheza District

Area
  - Total: 91 km^{2} (35 sq mi)

Population (2012)
  - Total: 5,553

Ethnic groups
  - Settler: Swahili & Shambaa
  - Ancestral: Bondei
- Tanzanian Postal Code: 21428

Amani (Kata ya Amani, in Swahili) is an administrative ward in Muheza District of Tanga Region in Tanzania. Mbomole and Msalai form the ward's northern boundary. Kisiwani is to the east, and Potwe lies to the south. Kwagunda of Korogwe is the western boundary of the ward. The ward is home to the famous Amani Forest Nature Reserve. The ward covers an area of 91 km^{2} (35 sq mi), and has an average elevation of 963 m (3,159 ft). According to the 2012 census, the ward has a total population of 5,553.

== Administration ==
The postal code for Amani Ward is 21428. The ward is divided into the following neighborhoods (Mitaa):

- Chemka
- Emau
- IBC Kijijini
- Kwamandenga
- Lukungwi
- Madizini
- Makanye
- Migombani
- Mikwinini

- Mlesa
- Mlesa Kijijini
- Msalagambo
- Msasa IBC
- Mtakuja
- Sangarawe
- Shebomeza
- Ugamba

=== Government ===
The ward, like every other ward in the country, has local government offices based on the population served. The Amani Ward administration building houses a court as per the Ward Tribunal Act of 1988, including other vital departments for the administration the ward. The ward has the following administration offices:

- Amani Police Station
- Amani Government Office (Afisa Mtendaji)
- Amani Tribunal (Baraza La Kata) is a Department inside Ward Government Office

In the local government system of Tanzania, the ward is the smallest democratic unit. Each ward is composed of a committee of eight elected council members which include a chairperson, one salaried officer (with no voting rights), and an executive officer. One-third of seats are reserved for women councillors.

== Demographics ==
Like much of the district, the ward is the ancestral home of the Bondei people.

== Education and health ==
=== Education ===
The ward is home to these educational institutions:

- Amani Primary School
- Mikwinini Primary School
- Misalai Primary School
- Kwamkoro Primary School

=== Healthcare ===
The ward is home to the following health institutions:

- Amani Health Center
