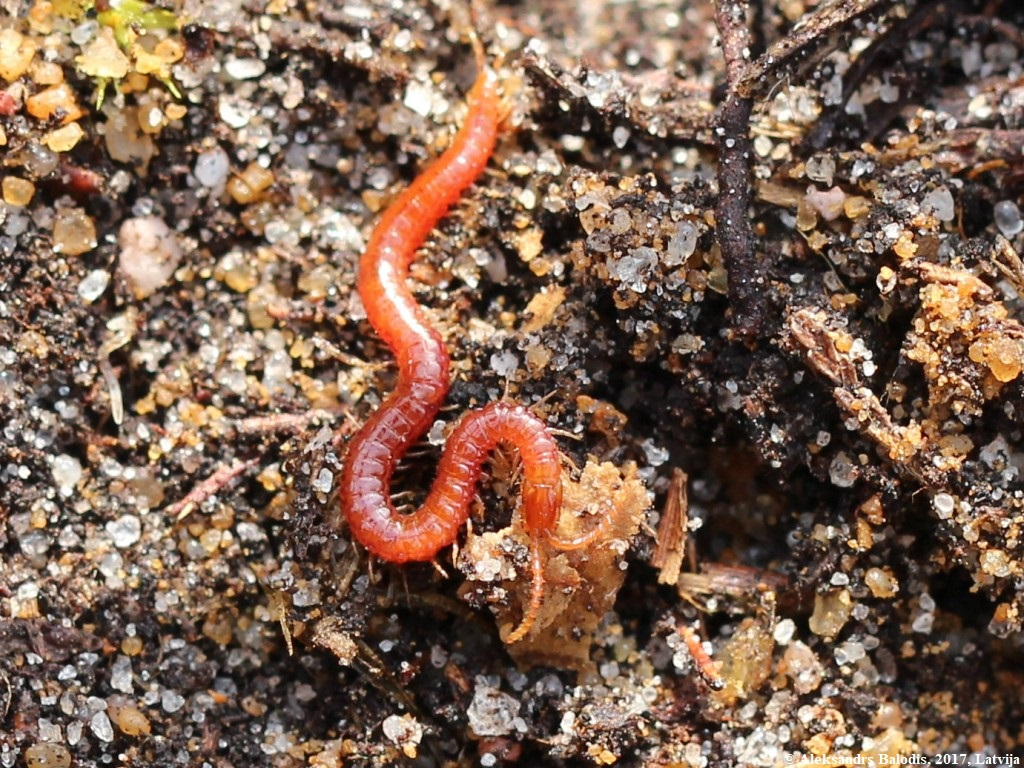

Scientific classification
- Kingdom: Animalia
- Phylum: Arthropoda
- Subphylum: Myriapoda
- Class: Chilopoda
- Order: Geophilomorpha
- Family: Geophilidae
- Genus: Pachymerium
- Species: P. ferrugineum

Binomial name
- Pachymerium ferrugineum (C. L. Koch, 1835)

Synonyms
- Geophilus ferrugineum C. L. Koch, 1835

= Pachymerium ferrugineum =

Species of centipede

Pachymerium ferrugineum is a species of centipede in the family Geophilidae.

== Description ==
This species includes both a "short form" that can reach 50 mm in length with 41 to 49 pairs of legs and a "long form" that can reach 70 mm in length with 51 or more leg pairs. The number of legs varies widely in this species, ranging from as few as 41 pairs in Northern Europe to as many as 69 pairs in Palestine.

Various studies have been done on the intraspecific variation of Pachymerium ferrugineum to show the significance of the species geographical location to their number of leg-bearing segments. One study published in the Biological Journal of the Linnean Society showed that these species exhibit more leg-bearing segments in Southern geographical locations versus the Northern regions in North-west Europe. A study conducted in the Aegean region has shown that the leg-bearing segments of Pachymerium ferrugineum in the Cyclades possibly vary due to insular characteristics of the island.

== Distribution ==
The species can be found in Central Europe, Crete, the Iberian Peninsula, Scandinavia, the shore of the White Sea, as well as in Asian countries such as Japan and Turkey, and on Atlantic islands such as the Azores, and Canary Islands. It is also found in Alaska, Mexico, Hawaii and Easter Island.
