= Muheza =

Capital of Muheza District, Tanga Region

Muheza Mji wa Muheza (Swahili)
- Capital of Muheza District
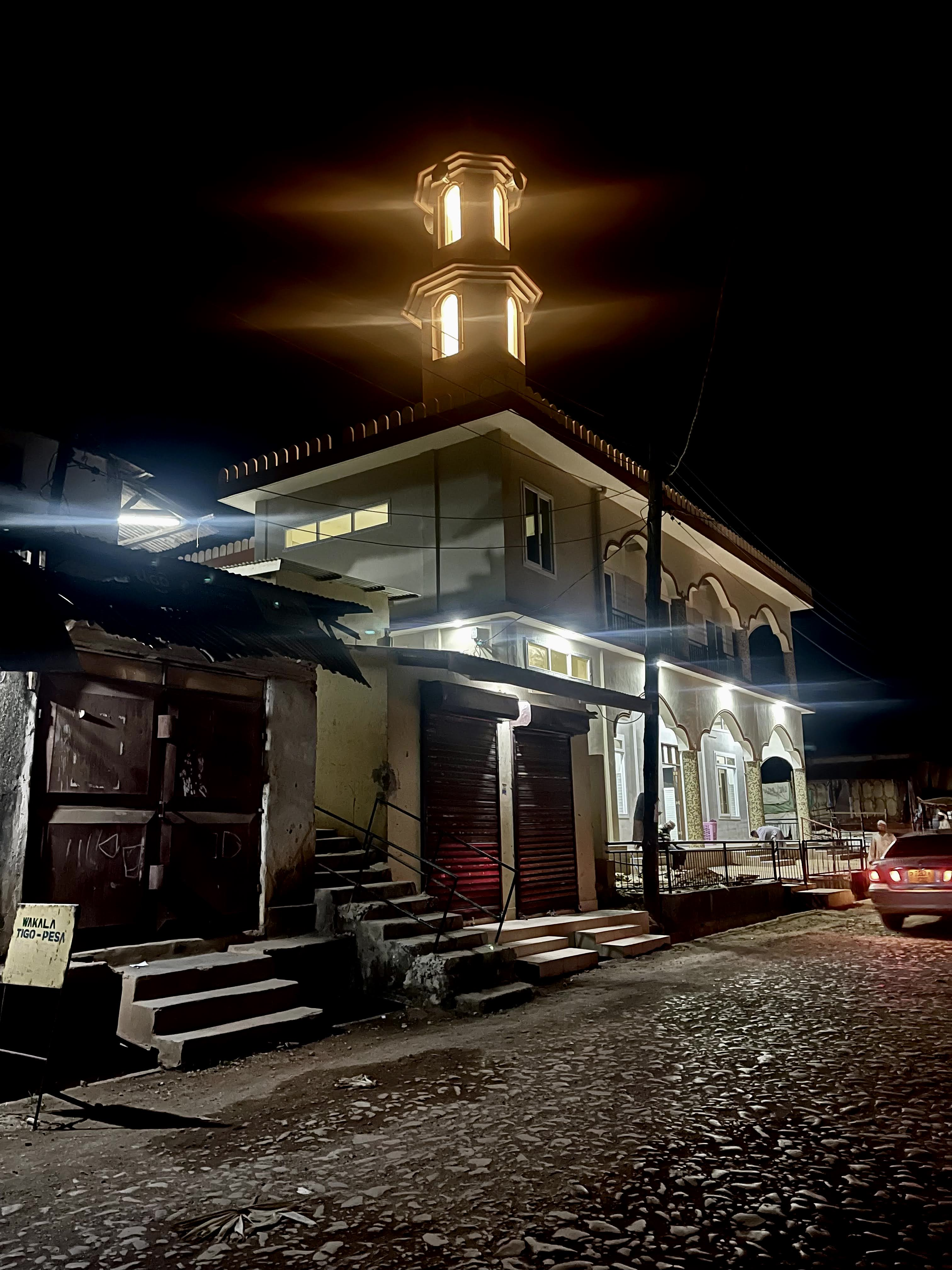
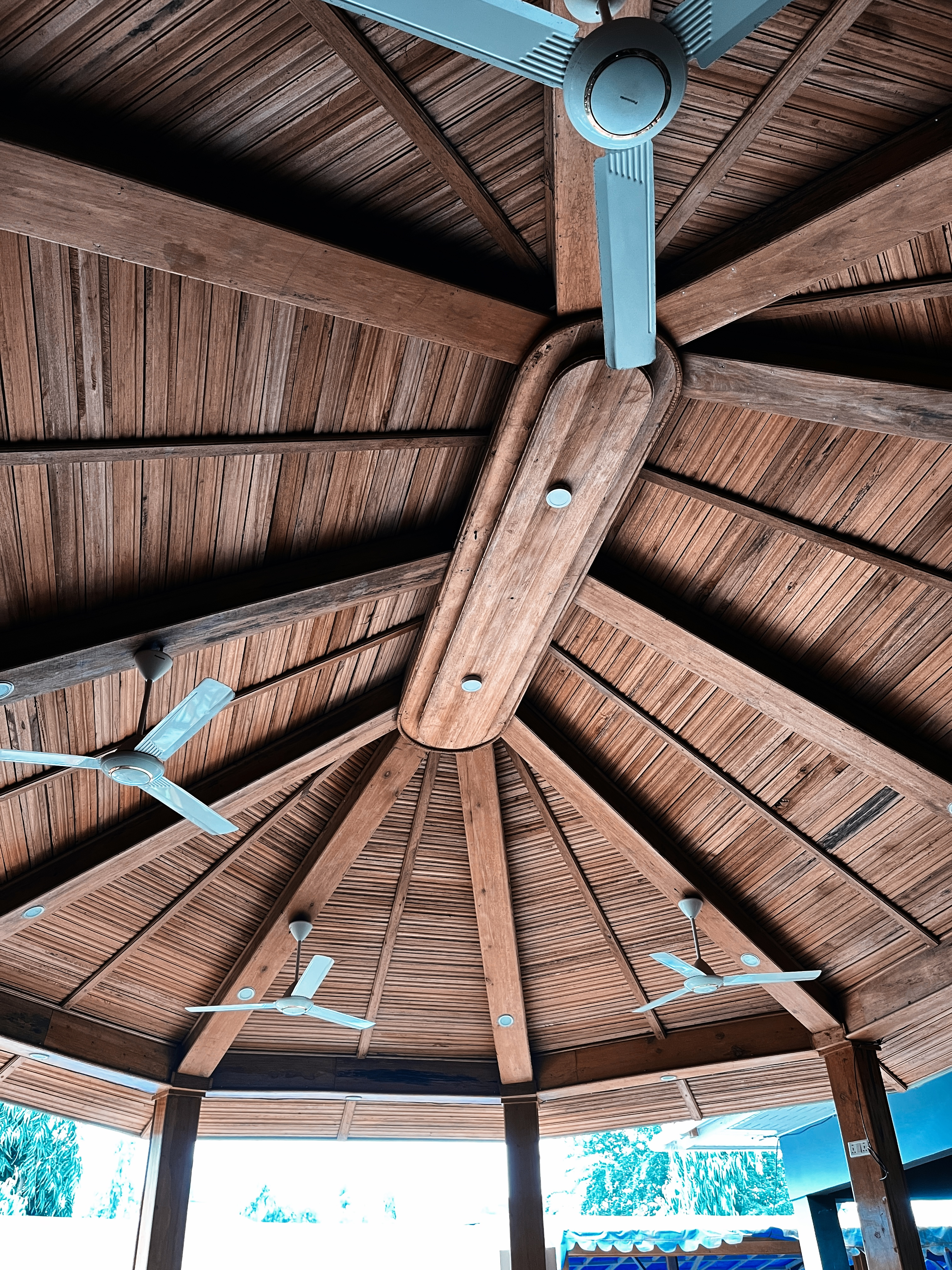
- From top to bottom: Mosque in Muheza town at night, Veranda detail Muheza town
- Nickname: Muheza's Muheza
- Location within Tanzania
- Coordinates: 05°10′26″S 38°47′15″E
- Country: Tanzania
- Region: Tanga Region
- District: Muheza District

Population (2022)
  - Total: 20,000

Ethnic groups
  - Settler: Swahili & Sambaa
  - Ancestral: Bondei

Muheza (Mji wa Muheza, in Swahili) is a town and capital of Muheza District in the Tanga Region of Tanzania. In the Muheza district, the town covers five wards; Majengo ward to the east, Tanganyika ward to the north, Genge and Majengo ward to the east, and Kwemkabala ward to the west. Paved trunk road T13 from Segera to the Kenyan border passes through Muheza town. The town also has a station on the Tanga-Arusha Railway.
