= Bondei people =

Ethnic group from Tanga Region of Tanzania

Bondei
Wabondei

Total population
- 100,000

Regions with significant populations
- Tanzania Tanga Region (Muheza District) (Pangani District)

Languages
- Bondei, Shambaa & Swahili

Religion
- Majority Islam, Minority Christianity and African Traditional Religion

Related ethnic groups
- Sambaa, Zigua, Chaga, Pare & other Bantu peoples

- Person: Mbondei
- People: Wabondei
- Language: Kibondei

The Bondei People (Swahili: Wabondei) are a Bantu ethnic group based in Muheza District and Pangani District of eastern Tanga Region in Tanzania. The Bondei speak Kibondei, a Bantu language and are culturally related to the Shambaa and Masai ethnic group.

== Overview and history ==
The name "Bondei" was given to the people by the Kilindi dynasty after their conquest, who called them "WaBondei"- people of the valley. This was to describe the people who lived between the Lwengera Valley and the sea east of the usambaras. After the Kilindi Kingdom collapsed in 1868, the Bondei moved southwards from Magila near present day town of Muheza towards southern Muheza District and most of Pangani District. They also moved lands south of the Sigi River. However, due to rampant slave raiding after the collapse of the Kilindi kingdom, some Zigua migrants also became the Bondei people for protection escaping to Magila. The Bondei population is roughly 100,000. Most of Bondei people reside in Pangani District where they engage in different activities, especially small-scale agriculture. Some Bondei also reside in east Muheza District. The first Bondei to go overseas was a man named Dr. Geldart Mhando in 1890.

The Kiva insurrection of 1869, which had its roots in the breakdown of the Shambaa state spurred on by long-distance trade, was the fourth and most significant popular movement.

The insurgents were Bondei people, who lived in the plains east of Usambara and were subdued and incorporated into the Shambaa kingdom around the beginning of the nineteenth century. The Bondei, who had previously been stateless, reaped personal benefits from allegiance to a monarch who could resolve otherwise insurmountable internal problems, but they did not gain much from the state. Kilindi who were thought to be too dangerous to control Usambara were punished by being transferred to the Bondei. Due to their distance from the city, the Bondei received no redistributed goods in exchange for the tribute they were required to pay. When they traveled to Vugha, they were regarded as foreigners and were not permitted to enter the town.

The Bondei were understandably terrified by the Kiva revolt, which allowed them to reclaim their freedom, and the restoration of the kingdom. The Bondei, a staunchly stateless people, were unable to recognize any one of their kind as leader since any family head would invariably spark opposition from all other families. The Germans and early British regimes both appointed foreign akidas to deal with this challenge, but because to Cameron's intense hate of akidas, the akida had to be transformed into an elected jumbe Mkuu (superior headman).

The two candidates for the inaugural election in November 1925 were Geldart Mhina, a Christian Bondei clerk and the founder of TTACSA, and John Juma, the serving akida and the son of a Bondei man and a Kilindi woman. Despite the fact that everyone would have wanted John Juma to be an akida, 95% of the elders and headmen chose him, according to the provincial commissioner. The losing party interpreted the selection of a part-Kilindi as a return of Kilindi hegemony.

Bondei elders were unable to choose a jumbe Mkuu twice more between the wars, in 1930 and 1934, and were forced to accept the government's candidacy of persons with Kilindi ties. Bondei acquired the skill of presenting political assertions in terms of the past in the interim. While Geldart Mhina disputed that he was the last surviving member of Bonde's old kings, his followers asserted that they were reminded of the Kilindi carnage during Kiva "every time we see a Kilindi on the throne." Strangely, their idea of a "pure Bondei" derived from those members of the Shambaa-Zigua language group who lived "in the valley."

== See also ==
- List of ethnic groups in Tanzania
