= Schindleria brevipinguis =

Conservation status
- Data Deficient (IUCN 3.1)

Scientific classification
- Kingdom: Animalia
- Phylum: Chordata
- Class: Actinopterygii
- Division: Teleostei
- Order: Gobiiformes
- Family: Gobiidae
- Genus: Schindleria
- Species: S. brevipinguis

Binomial name
- Schindleria brevipinguis Watson & Walker, 2004

Species of fish

Schindleria brevipinguis is a species of marine fish in family Gobiidae of Perciformes. Known as the stout infantfish, it is native to Australia's Great Barrier Reef and to Osprey Reef in the Coral Sea.

== Anatomy ==
S. brevipinguis is among the smallest known fish in the world, together with species such as Paedocypris progenetica. Males of S. brevipinguis have an average standard length of 7.7 mm (0.30 in), a gravid female was 8.4 mm (0.33 in) and the maximum standard length of the species is 10 mm (0.39 in). It held the record for the smallest known vertebrate, but now, by a measurement of snout-to-vent length, the smallest vertebrate species currently is the recently (Jan 2012) described frog Paedophryne amauensis, while the parasitic males of the anglerfish Photocorynus spiniceps are but 6.2 millimetres (0.24 in) long. S. brevipinguis is distinguished from the similar S. praematura by having its first anal-fin ray further forward, under dorsal-fin 4, rather than 7–11 in S. praematura. Like most closely related fishes, the fish is very thin, and one specimen weighed just 0.7 milligrams.

== Taxonomy ==
The specific epithet, brevipinguis, derives from the Latin brevis (short) and pinguis (stout), in reference to the fish's shorter, thicker body, as compared with other Schindleria species.

The first specimen was collected by Jeff Leis in 1979, but the species was not formally described until a 2004 paper (Watson and Walker).

== See also ==
- Smallest organisms
