= Aphantophryne minuta =

Conservation status
- Least Concern (IUCN 3.1)

Scientific classification
- Kingdom: Animalia
- Phylum: Chordata
- Class: Amphibia
- Order: Anura
- Family: Microhylidae
- Genus: Aphantophryne
- Species: A. minuta

Binomial name
- Aphantophryne minuta Zweifel and Parker, 1989
- Aphantophryne minuta is only known from near the Myola Guest House in eastern Papua New Guinea

Species of frog

Aphantophryne minuta is a species of frog in the family Microhylidae. It is endemic to Papua New Guinea and is known from its type locality near Myola Guest House in the Owen Stanley Range, Northern Province, from another locality in the same province, Mount Tafa; only a single specimen is known from each locality. The specific name minuta refers to the very small size of this species. Common name Myola Guinea frog has been coined for it.

== Description ==
Aphantophryne minuta was described based on a single adult female, the holotype, measuring 12 mm (0.5 in) in snout–vent length. It is very similar to Aphantophryne sabini but much smaller (mature A. sabini females measure 19–24 mm (0.7–0.9 in) in snout–vent length). The snout is short and rounded. The tympanum is small and only partially visible. The fingers and toes have rounded tips and no webbing. The hind legs are short. The dorsum is warty, including the scapular folds that continue backward as rows of warts. The preserved specimen is dorsally dark brown between the wart rows and has paler brown flanks. The venter is dirty white. The specimen was carrying two ova.

== Habitat and conservation ==
The holotype was found under a small, decayed log lying in leaf litter on a rainforested ridge at 2,700 m (8,900 ft) above sea level. The Mount Tafa specimen is from 2,400 m (7,900 ft). Breeding is presumably by direct development (i.e, there is no free-living larval stage).

This species has no known threats and occurs in an area with very little human impact.
