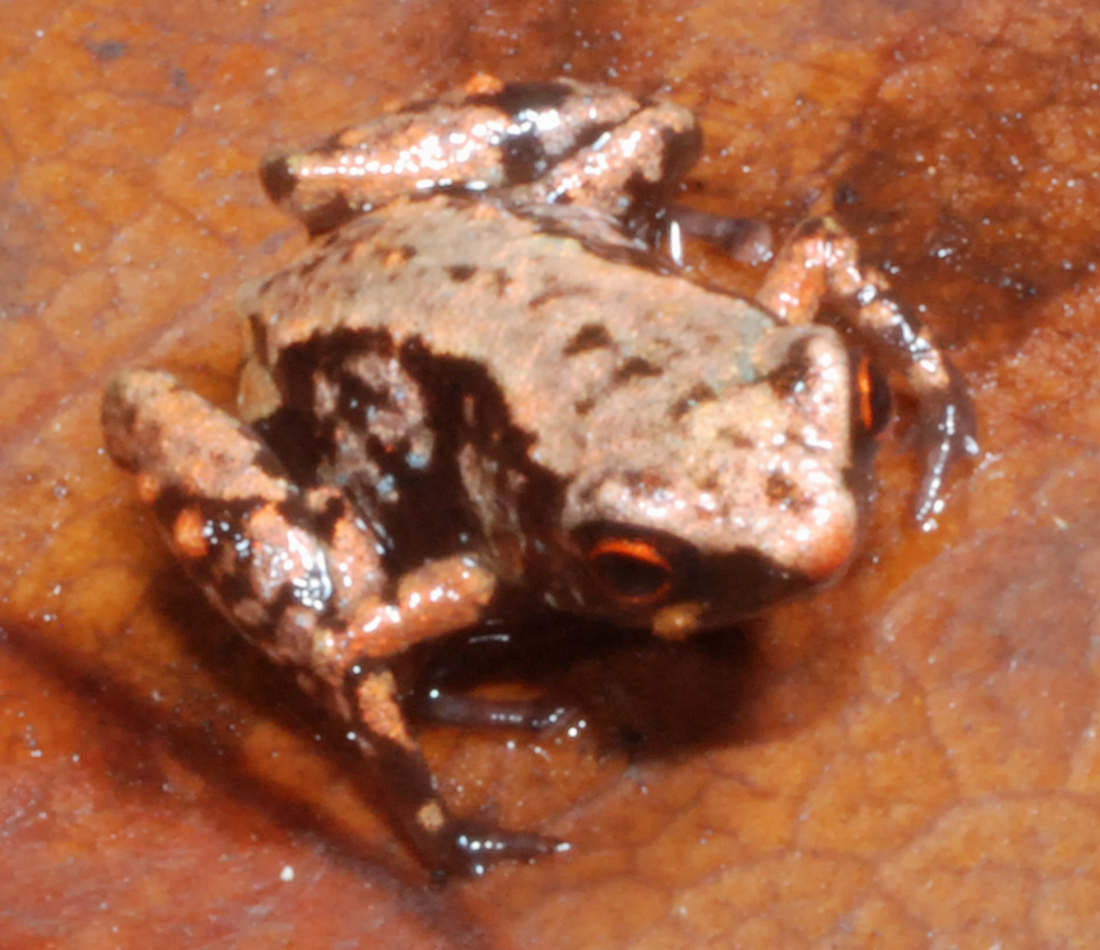
- Paratype of Paedophryne swiftorum

Scientific classification
- Kingdom: Animalia
- Phylum: Chordata
- Class: Amphibia
- Order: Anura
- Family: Microhylidae
- Genus: Paedophryne
- Species: P. swiftorum

Binomial name
- Paedophryne swiftorum Rittmeyer et al., 2012

= Paedophryne swiftorum =

Species of frog

Paedophryne swiftorum is a species of frog from Papua New Guinea discovered in 2008 and formally described in January 2012. It lives among leaf litter on the tropical rainforest floor and was named after the Swift family who had provided funds for establishing the Kamiali Biological Station where the new species was found.

== Discovery ==
Paedophryne swiftorum was first discovered by a student on a 2008 Cornell University expedition to Papua New Guinea. The male frog makes a series of double clicks which the investigators had previously heard but had thought to be made by crickets. Hearing this sound at close quarters while examining a millipede in the leaf litter, Michael Gründler turned his head and saw a minute frog rhythmically inflating its vocal sac. Measuring just 8.5 millimetres (0.33 in), it might have been thought not to be fully grown except for the fact that calling is normally only done by mature male frogs as an advertisement to attract females. Paedophryne swiftorum is one of the smallest vertebrates in the world but the following year, an even smaller species was discovered. The closely related Paedophryne amauensis, measuring just 7.7 millimetres (0.30 in), was discovered in the same vicinity on the forest floor. These frogs are very difficult to spot because they are so well camouflaged and are hidden among the dead leaves. However, their presence is detectable by the shrill insect-like calls they emit. Paedophryne swiftorum is also among the smallest frog in the Southern Hemisphere, and Paedophryne swiftorum body length (8.5 mm (0.33 in)) is also smaller than Brachycephalus didactylus body length 9.6–9.8 mm (0.38–0.39 in), but Paedophryne swiftorum is not listed in the Smallest organisms list, is not included in the smallest vertebrates known with other nine species of frogs.

== Description ==
The average length of Paedophryne swiftorum is 8.5 millimetres (0.33 in). The back is dark brown irregularly marked with pale or rusty brown mottling, sometimes with a tan dorsal stripe. The underside is dark brown with a paler belly. The head is short and broad with a blunt snout and large eyes. The legs are fairly long, the fingers and toes unwebbed and the first digits of hands and feet truncated. Some of the other digits are also reduced in size. The call consists of a series of four, six or eight double notes and is made at dawn and dusk but also during the day in wet weather.

== Habitat ==
Similar to all species of Paedophryne so far described, Paedophryne swiftorum lives in the leaf litter on the floors of tropical forests where it is well camouflaged by its mottled brown colouring. It seems to be a fairly common species judging by the fact that calling males occur at separations of approximately 50 centimetres (20 in). It feeds on tiny invertebrates such as mites and springtails and is likely to be preyed on by birds, small mammals and even large invertebrates. Reproduction is likely to be by direct development without an aquatic tadpole stage.
