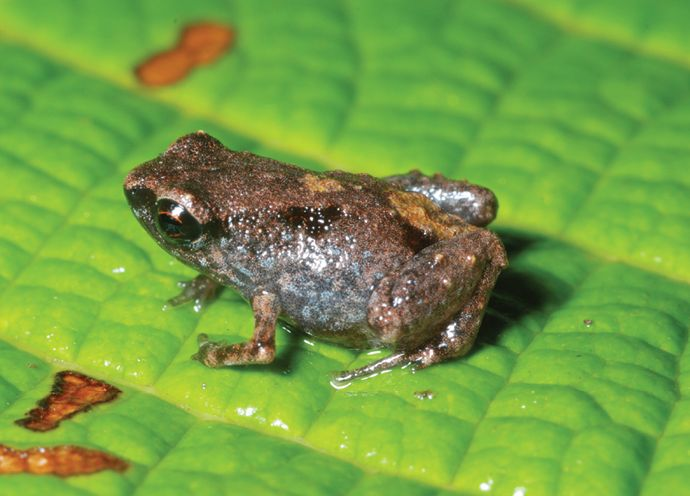
- Paedophryne dekot

Scientific classification
- Kingdom: Animalia
- Phylum: Chordata
- Class: Amphibia
- Order: Anura
- Family: Microhylidae
- Subfamily: Asterophryinae; Günther, 1858

Genera
- See text.

Synonyms
- Genyophryninae Boulenger, 1890

= Asterophryinae =

Subfamily of amphibians

Asterophryinae is a subfamily of microhylid frogs distributed in an area from the Peninsular Malaysia through the Malay Archipelago to northern Australia.

== Genera ==
The following genera are recognised in the subfamily Asterophryinae:

- Aphantophryne Fry, 1917
- Asterophrys Tschudi, 1838
- Austrochaperina Fry, 1912
- Barygenys Parker, 1936
- Callulops Boulenger, 1888
- Choerophryne Van Kampen, 1914
- Cophixalus Boettger, 1892
- Copiula Méhely, 1901
- Gastrophrynoides Noble, 1926
- Hylophorbus Macleay, 1878
- Mantophryne Boulenger, 1897
- Oninia Günther, Stelbrink, and von Rintelen, 2010
- Oreophryne Boettger, 1895
- Paedophryne Kraus, 2010
- Siamophryne Suwannapoom, Sumontha, Tunprasert, Ruangsuwan, Pawangkhanant, Korost & Poyarkov, 2018
- Sphenophryne Peters and Doria, 1878
- Vietnamophryne Poyarkov, Suwannapoom, Pawangkhanant, Aksornneam, Duong, Korost, & Che, 2018
- Xenorhina Peters, 1863 (synonym: Xenobatrachus Peters and Doria, 1878)

The most species-rich genus is Oreophryne (71 species). Two genera are monotypic: Oninia and Siamophryne.

The genera Siamophryne and Vietnamophryne were added to Asterophryinae in 2018.

== Body size ==
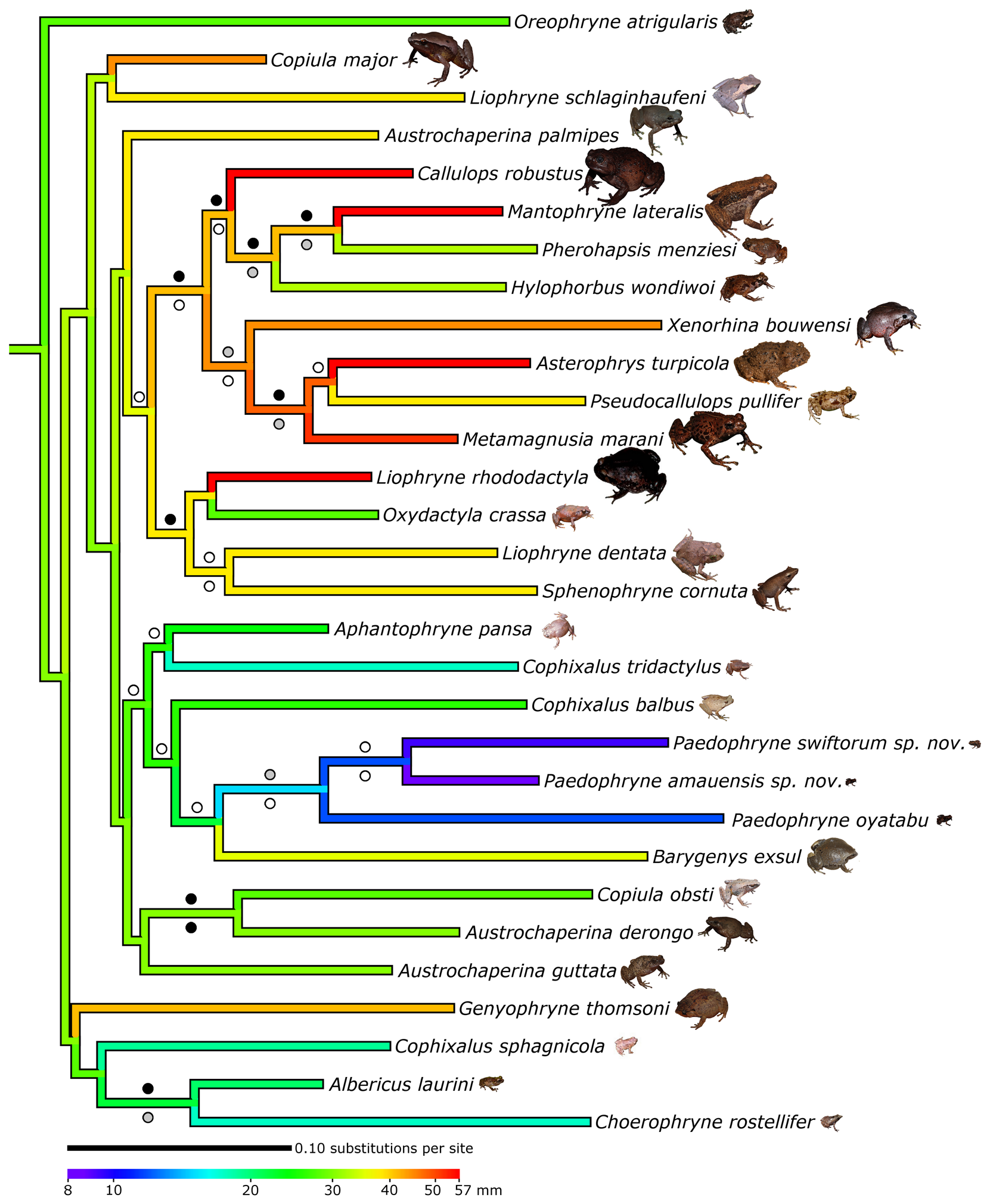
Phylogeny and evolution of body size in Asterophryinae. Colours of branches correspond to maximum male snout-vent length (Paedophryne) or average snout-vent length within each clade on a logarithmic scale.

Microhylid frogs are generally small. A few species such as Callulops robustus and Asterophrys turpicola attain snout-vent lengths (SVL) in excess of 50 mm (2.0 in), whereas frogs in genus Paedophryne are particularly small, and Paedophryne amauensis is the world's smallest known vertebrate, attaining an average body size of only 7.7 mm (0.30 in) (range 7.0–8.0 mm).
