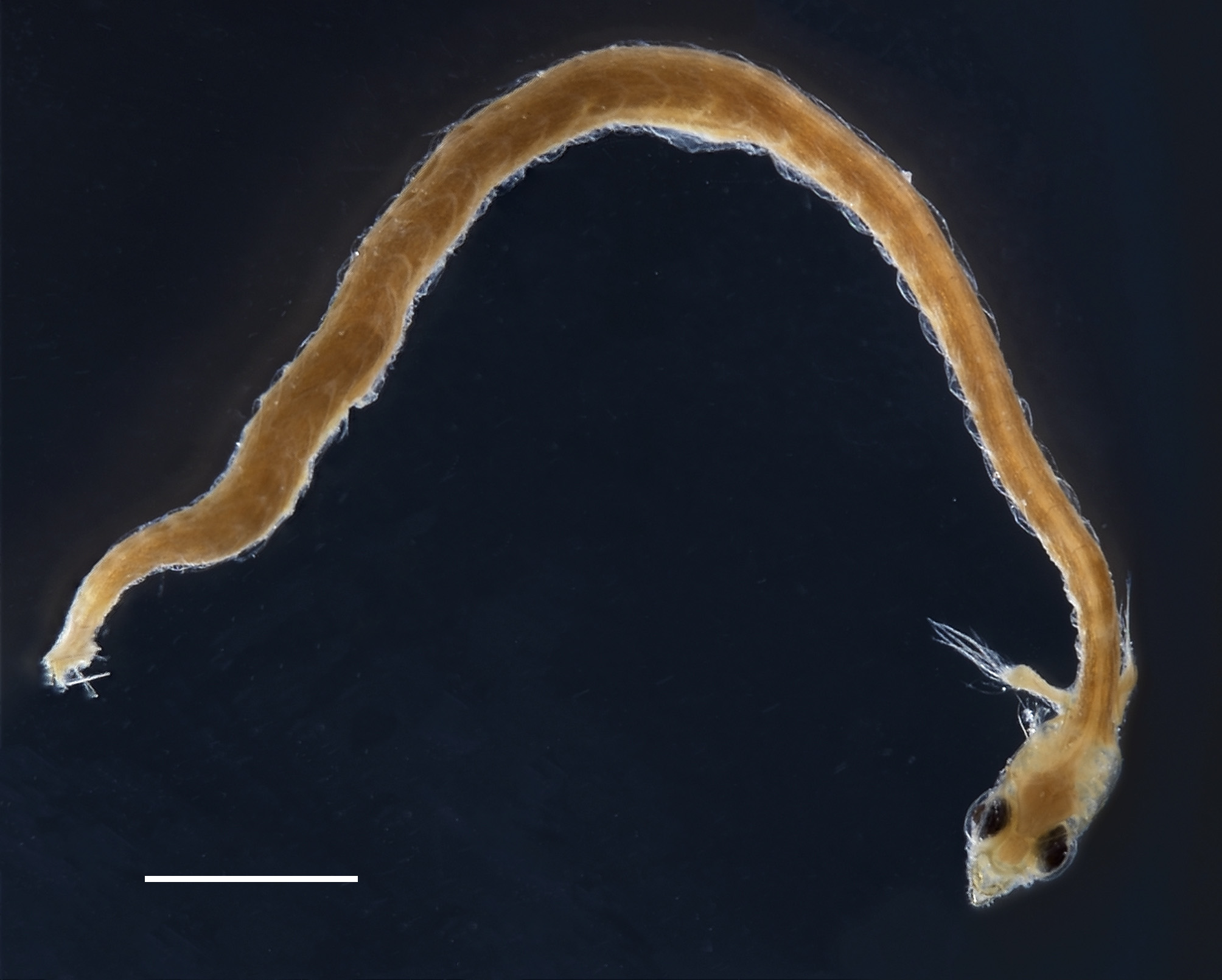
- Schindleria macrodentata

Scientific classification
- Kingdom: Animalia
- Phylum: Chordata
- Class: Actinopterygii
- Order: Gobiiformes
- Family: Gobiidae
- Genus: Schindleria; Giltay, 1934

Type species
- Hemiramphus praematurus Schindler, 1930

Species
- See text.

= Schindleria =

Genus of fishes

Schindleria is a genus of marine fish. It was the only genus of family Schindleriidae, among the Gobioidei of order Perciformes but is now classified under the Gobiidae in the Gobiiformes. The type species is S. praematura, Schindler's fish. The Schindleria species are known generically as Schindler's fishes after German zoologist Otto Schindler (1906–1959), or infantfishes. They are native to the southern Pacific Ocean, from the South China Sea to the Great Barrier Reef off eastern Australia, and Rapa Nui.

== Description ==
The infant fishes are so called because they retain many of their larval characteristics (an example of neoteny). Their elongated bodies are transparent, and many of the bones never develop. S. praematura reaches a length of 2.5 cm (0.98 in). All of the Schindleria species are reef fishes. They may be among the most common fish of the reefs, based on the results of plankton tows, but because of their transparency and small size, they are infrequently seen in life.

A recently described species, the stout infantfish, S. brevipinguis, was briefly the world's smallest known vertebrate at 8 mm (about one-third inch), smaller even than the dwarf gobies, until the new record was set by the 7.9-mm Paedocypris progenetica in early 2006 and supplanted by the 7.7-mm frog Paedophryne amauensis in 2012.

Apparently several (at least eight) further Schindleria species, native to the Ryukyu Islands, are yet to be described formally.

== Species ==
Schindleria contains the following species:

- Schindleria brevipinguis Watson & Walker, 2004 (Stout infantfish)
- Schindleria edentata Ahnelt, Robitzch, Abu El-Regal, 2022
- Schindleria elongata R. Fricke & Abu El-Regal, 2017 (Elongate paedomorphic goby)
- Schindleria macrodentata Ahnelt & Sauberer, 2018 (Schindler's largetooth goby)
- Schindleria multidentata Ahnelt, 2020
- Schindleria nigropunctata Fricke & Abu El-Regal, 2017 (Blackspotted paedomorphic goby)
- Schindleria parva Abu El-Regal, El-Sherbiny, Gabr & Fricke, 2021
- Schindleria pietschmanni (Schindler, 1931) (Pietschmann's floater)
- Schindleria praematura (Schindler, 1930) (Schindler's fish)
- Schindleria qizma Ahnelt, Macek & Robitzch 2023
- Schindleria squirei Robitzch, Landaeta & Ahnelt, 2023

== Sources ==
- Burke, Jack D. (1970). Cell Biology. Williams and Wilkins. p. 200. ISBN 978-0-683-01212-5.
- Froese, Rainer; Pauly, Daniel (eds.). "Species in genus Schindleria". FishBase. October 2004 version.
- Froese, Rainer; Pauly, Daniel (eds.). "Family Schindleriidae". FishBase. October 2004 version.
