= Aphantophryne parkeri =

Conservation status
- Data Deficient (IUCN 3.1)

Scientific classification
- Kingdom: Animalia
- Phylum: Chordata
- Class: Amphibia
- Order: Anura
- Family: Microhylidae
- Genus: Aphantophryne
- Species: A. parkeri

Binomial name
- Aphantophryne parkeri (Loveridge, 1955)

Synonyms
- Oreophryne parkeri Loveridge, 1955

Species of amphibian

Aphantophryne parkeri is a species of frog in the family Microhylidae. It is endemic to the north coast of New Guinea and only known from Matapan (or Matapau) and the Bewani Mountains in the West Sepik Province, Papua New Guinea, and from Sentani in the Papua Province, Western New Guinea (Indonesia). This species was formerly included in the genus Oreophryne, but was in 2017 moved to Aphantophryne based on molecular data. The specific name parkeri honours Hampton Wildman Parker, an English zoologist and herpetologist. Common name Parker's cross frog has been coined for it.

== Description ==
Adult males measure about 23–24 mm (0.91–0.94 in) and adult females 26–29 mm (1.02–1.14 in) in snout–vent length (each of these ranges is based on just two specimens). The head is relatively narrow. The snout bluntly rounded, approaching truncate, in dorsal view, and vertical in profile. The canthus rostralis is rounded. The tympanum is moderately distinct to indistinct. The fingers and the toes have well-developed terminal disks. The fingers have no webbing whereas the toes have moderate webbing. The dorsum is light brown and has irregular darker small spots interrupted by a sharply defined, dark W-like mark in the scapular area. There are abundant tiny white spots over all dorsal and lateral surfaces and limbs. The iris is dark brown.

The male advertisement call is a train of 21–34 notes, with a dominant frequency of 2600–2900 Hz. The notes are uttered at a rate of 5 s^{−1}, and the call lasts about 5 seconds.

== Habitat and conservation ==
Aphantophryne parkeri occurs in very disturbed forests and sago swamps in highly disturbed habitats at 90–300 m (300–980 ft) above sea level. The type series was reported as having been collected "from running water in sago-palm forest", but this is likely erroneous because no related species is aquatic; an earlier account on the same specimens stated them having been collected "near running water". In Sentani, males were calling from about 3–6 m above ground in banana plants and sago palms in an area of garden regrowth.

There are no known threats to this species, and it appears to adapt to disturbance. It is common in the Papuan locality. It presumably occurs in Cyclops Nature Reserve.
