= Vietnamophryne occidentalis =

Conservation status
- Data Deficient (IUCN 3.1)

Scientific classification
- Kingdom: Animalia
- Phylum: Chordata
- Class: Amphibia
- Order: Anura
- Family: Microhylidae
- Genus: Vietnamophryne
- Species: V. occidentalis

Binomial name
- Vietnamophryne occidentalis Poyarkov, Suwannapoom, Pawangkhanant, Aksornneam, Duong, Korost and Che, 2018

Species of frog

Vietnamophryne occidentalis is a species of microhylid frog endemic to northern Thailand. Its type locality is Doi Tung Mountain, Chiang Rai Province, northern Thailand.
