= Gastrophrynoides borneensis =

Conservation status
- Least Concern (IUCN 3.1)

Scientific classification
- Kingdom: Animalia
- Phylum: Chordata
- Class: Amphibia
- Order: Anura
- Family: Microhylidae
- Genus: Gastrophrynoides
- Species: G. borneensis

Binomial name
- Gastrophrynoides borneensis (Boulenger, 1897)

Synonyms
- Engystoma borneense Boulenger, 1897

Species of frog

Gastrophrynoides borneensis is a species of frog in the family Microhylidae. It is endemic to Borneo and is known from Sarawak and Sabah in Malaysia, but it is likely to be also found in adjacent Kalimantan (Indonesia). Common name Borneo narrowmouth toad has been coined for it.

Gastrophrynoides borneensis is a lowland forest species that occurs in leaf-litter of the forest floor. It is threatened by habitat loss caused by clear-cutting.
