= Vietnamophryne inexpectata =

Conservation status
- Data Deficient (IUCN 3.1)

Scientific classification
- Kingdom: Animalia
- Phylum: Chordata
- Class: Amphibia
- Order: Anura
- Family: Microhylidae
- Genus: Vietnamophryne
- Species: V. inexpectata

Binomial name
- Vietnamophryne inexpectata Poyarkov, Suwannapoom, Pawangkhanant, Aksornneam, Duong, Korost and Che, 2018

Species of frog

Vietnamophryne inexpectata is a species of microhylid frog endemic to the Central Highlands of Vietnam. Its type locality is Kon Chu Rang Nature Reserve, Gia Lai Province, central Vietnam.
