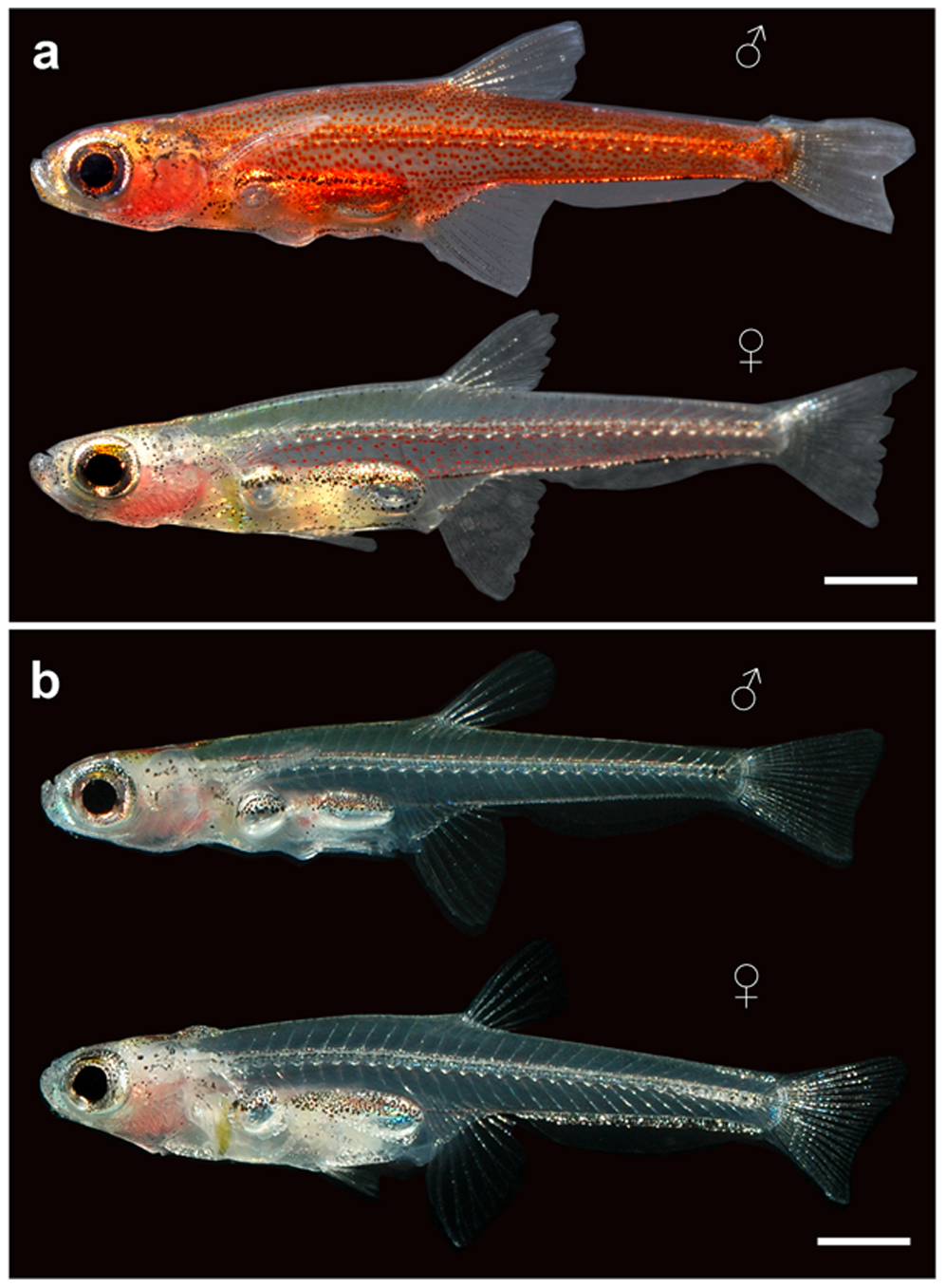
- Paedocypris carbunculus (top), Paedocypris sp. "Singkep" (bottom). Scale bar = 1 mm

Scientific classification
- Kingdom: Animalia
- Phylum: Chordata
- Class: Actinopterygii
- Order: Cypriniformes
- Suborder: Cyprinoidei
- Family: Paedocyprididae; Mayden & W.J. Chen, 2010
- Genus: Paedocypris; Kottelat, Britz, H. H. Tan & K. E. Witte, 2006

Type species
- Paedocypris progenetica Kottelat, Britz, H. H. Tan & K. E. Witte, 2006

= Paedocypris =

Genus of fishes

Paedocypris is a genus of tiny cyprinid fish found in swamps and streams on the Southeast Asian islands of Borneo, Sumatra and Bintan.

Paedocypris progenetica has been claimed to be the one of smallest known species of fish in the world, rivaling the sister genus Danionella of the family Danionidae. The smallest mature female measured 0.96 cm (0.38 in) and the largest known individual was 1.24 cm (0.49 in).And their average lengths 1.1 cm (0.43 in)The mass of the fish is 4 to 16mg. Its average weight is 10 mg.

== Species ==
The three currently recognized species in this genus are:

- Paedocypris carbunculus Britz & Kottelat, 2008
- Paedocypris micromegethes Kottelat, Britz, H. H. Tan & K. E. Witte, 2006
- Paedocypris progenetica Kottelat, Britz, H. H. Tan & K. E. Witte, 2006

== Taxonomy ==
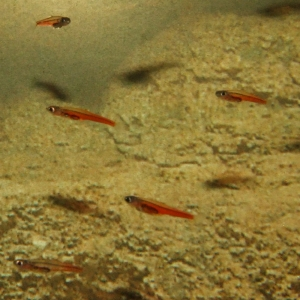
Paedocypris progenetica

Two species were discovered and identified by ichthyologists Maurice Kottelat from Switzerland and Tan Heok Hui from the Raffles Museum of Biodiversity Research and the National University of Singapore in 1996. Their osteology was studied by Ralf Britz at London's Natural History Museum. In 1994, the same ichthyologists had already discovered in Sarawak (Malaysian part of Borneo) another miniature species of the same genus Paedocypris. Like P. progenetica, P. micromegethes was found in the slow-flowing blackwater streams and peat swamps.

The genus, Paedocypris, and two species, Paedocypris progenetica and Paedocypris micromegethes, were first described in 2006. Paideios is Greek for children and cypris is Greek for Venus and is a common suffix for cyprinid genera; the gender is feminine. Progenetica (from the word progenetic) is used as an adjective. Micromegethes is Greek for small in size, and is used as a noun in apposition.

Paedocypris is considered a danionin genus by Tyson Roberts. Sundadanio and Paedocypris were found to share a sister group relationship, supporting its close relationship to danionin genera; however, this study included danionins among the subfamily Rasborinae.

== Appearance ==
Their miniature transparent bodies lack the typical features characteristic of adult fish, for instance a mineralised braincase, and it retains the postanal larval fin-fold along the ventral edge of the caudal peduncle, characteristic of fish larvae. They have a unique sexual dimorphism: The males have highly modified pelvic fins, with the first ray terminating with a hook-like projection of keratinized skin, supported by hypertrophied pelvic musculature. Males also have a pad of keratinized skin in front of the pelvic fins. These modified fins are thought to be used to grasp the female during mating, or to keep position over a spawning surface.

=== Smallest vertebrate ===
Paedocypris progenetica has been claimed to be the smallest known species of fish and vertebrate in the world, particularly before the description of the frog Paedophryne amauensis in 2012. The smallest mature P. progenetica female is only 0.96 cm (0.38 in) in standard length, smaller than the female of any other vertebrate species, including those of P. amauensis. The largest known individual is 1.24 cm (0.49 in).

Male individuals of the anglerfish species Photocorynus spiniceps have been documented to be 6.2–7.3 mm (0.24–0.29 in) at maturity, and thus claimed to be a smaller species. However, these survive only by sexual parasitism, and the female individuals reach the significantly larger size of 50.5 mm (1.99 in).

During their evolution where they have adapted to their environment and shrunk in size, they have lost at least seven and possibly as many as ten percent of their Hox genes (about 15–20 percent of the total amount) and much of their transposons, and their introns are much reduced. Because of their small size and development due to a simplification of their genome, their skulls consist of cartilage, about 40 of their skeletal bones will never be properly developed and the ribs are reduced and remain poorly ossified. Other groups of fish which live in the same environment have not gone through the same types of genetic and developmental changes. Paedocypris genomes are the first known examples of integrated filovirus-like elements in fish.

== Habitat and conservation ==
Paedocypris progenetica lives in the blackwater peat swamps of the Indonesian islands of Sumatra and Bintan. P. micromegethes lives in the peat swamps of Sarawak in northern Borneo, Malaysia. P. carbunculus is found in peat swamps in Central Kalimantan, Borneo, Indonesia. Members of this genus are habitat specialists that only live in acidic water. Within peat swamp forests, they are usually found to inhabit deeper, cooler water layers close to the bottom half of the water columns. They also tend to inhabit shaded areas in which light is usually absent from their environment. Their small size helps them to survive droughts, as they can live in small remaining puddles. However, their small ranges and specialised habitat make them extremely vulnerable to habitat loss, such as drainage of peat swamps and fires, and some populations have already disappeared. It has been speculated that some other miniature fish from the habitat and region may already have become extinct, even before being scientifically described or discovered. In Malaysia alone, it has been estimated that—in addition to Paedocypris—up to 15% of the freshwater fish species are associated with peat swamps, and based on current destruction rates all Bornean and Sumatran peatlands may be gone by 2040.
