= Schindleria squirei =

Scientific classification
- Domain: Eukaryota
- Kingdom: Animalia
- Phylum: Chordata
- Class: Actinopterygii
- Order: Gobiiformes
- Family: Gobiidae
- Genus: Schindleria
- Species: S. squirei

Binomial name
- Schindleria squirei Robitzch, Landaeta, Ahnelt 2023

Species of fish

Schindleria squirei is a tiny species of fish native to the surroundings of Easter Island, Chile. It belongs to the family Gobiidae, the same family as gobies. The specimens captured for study were caught in deep waters off Hanga Roa. Before its description as a new species, this fish was considered part of Schindleria praematura, because it is native to the Hawaiian archipelago and nearby islands, but Schindleria squirei has a long dorsal spine, different from the other species.
