= Aphantophryne sabini =

Conservation status
- Least Concern (IUCN 3.1)

Scientific classification
- Kingdom: Animalia
- Phylum: Chordata
- Class: Amphibia
- Order: Anura
- Family: Microhylidae
- Genus: Aphantophryne
- Species: A. sabini

Binomial name
- Aphantophryne sabini Zweifel and Parker, 1989
- Aphantophryne sabini is only known from near the Myola Guest House in eastern Papua New Guinea

Species of frog

Aphantophryne sabini is a species of frog in the family Microhylidae. It is endemic to Papua New Guinea and is only known from the region of its type locality, Myola Guest House in the Owen Stanley Range, Northern Province. The specific name sabini honors Andrew E. Sabin, an American businessman, philanthropist, and environmentalist who joined the expedition during which the holotype of this species was collected. However, its vernacular name Guest House Guinea frog refers to the type locality instead.

== Description ==
Males can grow to 17 mm (0.7 in) and females to 24 mm (0.9 in) in snout–vent length. The overall appearance is squat, and the head is notably narrower than the rotund body. The snout is rounded. The tympanum is poorly visible. The fingers and toes have rounded tips and no webbing. The hind legs are short. The holotype has orange-tan dorsal ground color, dark brown dorsal markings, and a white vertebral stripe bordered with black. However, most specimens lack the vertebral stripe. The darker dorsal pattern ranges from reddish brown to dark gray-brown. The flanks range from yellowish tan through duller tan to orange; the abdomen has a paler shade of orange

Aphantophryne sabini is similar to Aphantophryne pansa but slightly smaller. The most distinctive feature is the male advertisement call, which is a prolonged series of soft "clicks" in A. sabini; that of A. pansa is shorter but uttered at a higher click rate.

== Habitat and conservation ==
Aphantophryne sabini is known from montane grassy meadows, montane forest edges, and treefern-dominated grasslands at elevations of 2,080–2,600 m (6,820–8,530 ft) above sea level. Breeding is presumably by direct development (i.e., there is no free-living larval stage). It is a common species. There are no known threats to this species because habitats in the area where it occurs are probably reasonably secure.
