= Vietnamophryne orlovi =

Conservation status
- Data Deficient (IUCN 3.1)

Scientific classification
- Kingdom: Animalia
- Phylum: Chordata
- Class: Amphibia
- Order: Anura
- Family: Microhylidae
- Genus: Vietnamophryne
- Species: V. orlovi

Binomial name
- Vietnamophryne orlovi Poyarkov, Suwannapoom, Pawangkhanant, Aksornneam, Duong, Korost and Che, 2018

Species of frog

Vietnamophryne orlovi is a species of microhylid frog endemic to northern Vietnam. Its type locality is Phia Oac-Phia Den National Park, Cao Bang Province, northern Vietnam.
