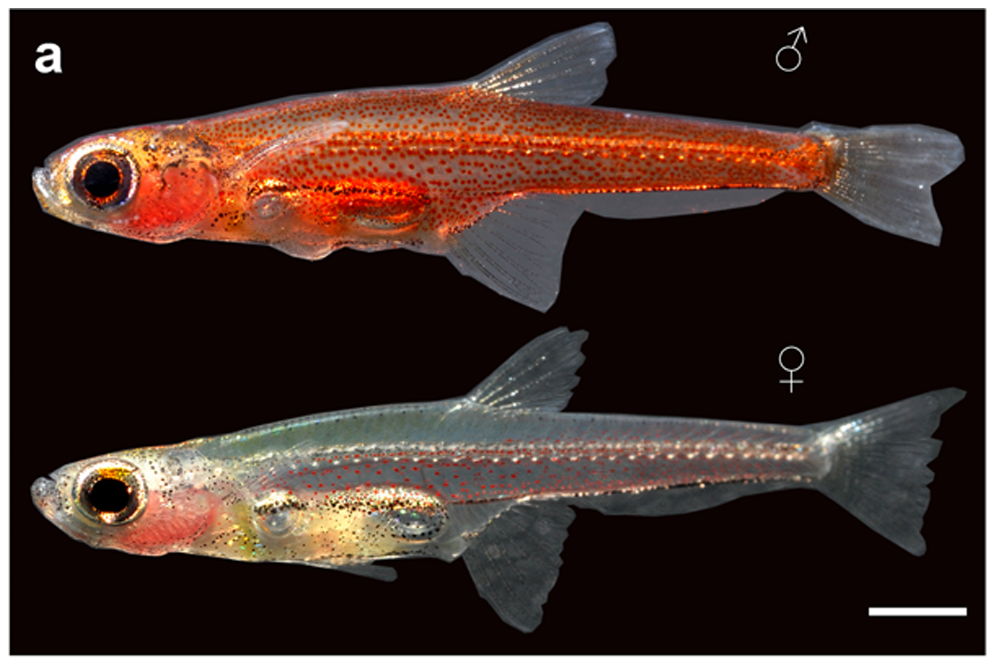
- Male (top), female (bottom)

Conservation status
- Near Threatened (IUCN 3.1)

Scientific classification
- Kingdom: Animalia
- Phylum: Chordata
- Class: Actinopterygii
- Order: Cypriniformes
- Family: Paedocyprididae
- Genus: Paedocypris
- Species: P. carbunculus

Binomial name
- Paedocypris carbunculus Britz & Kottelat, 2008

= Paedocypris carbunculus =

Species of fish

Paedocypris carbunculus, the Borneo paedocypris, is a tiny species of cyprinid fish endemic to peat swamps and blackwater streams in Central Kalimantan, Borneo, Indonesia. It is the most recently described species of the three in the genus Paedocypris and it reaches up to 11.5 mm (0.45 in) in standard length. This shoaling species has been kept and bred for several generations in aquariums.

The male P. carbunculus has a unique pelvic fin, along with a keratinized pad, that allows the male to latch on to the female for sexual reproduction.
