= Schindleria pietschmanni =

Scientific classification
- Kingdom: Animalia
- Phylum: Chordata
- Class: Actinopterygii
- Order: Gobiiformes
- Family: Gobiidae
- Genus: Schindleria
- Species: S. pietschmanni

Binomial name
- Schindleria pietschmanni Watson & Walker, 2004

Species of fish

Schindleria pietschmanni is a species of fish which was classified in the family Schindleriidae found in the Taiwan Strait.
