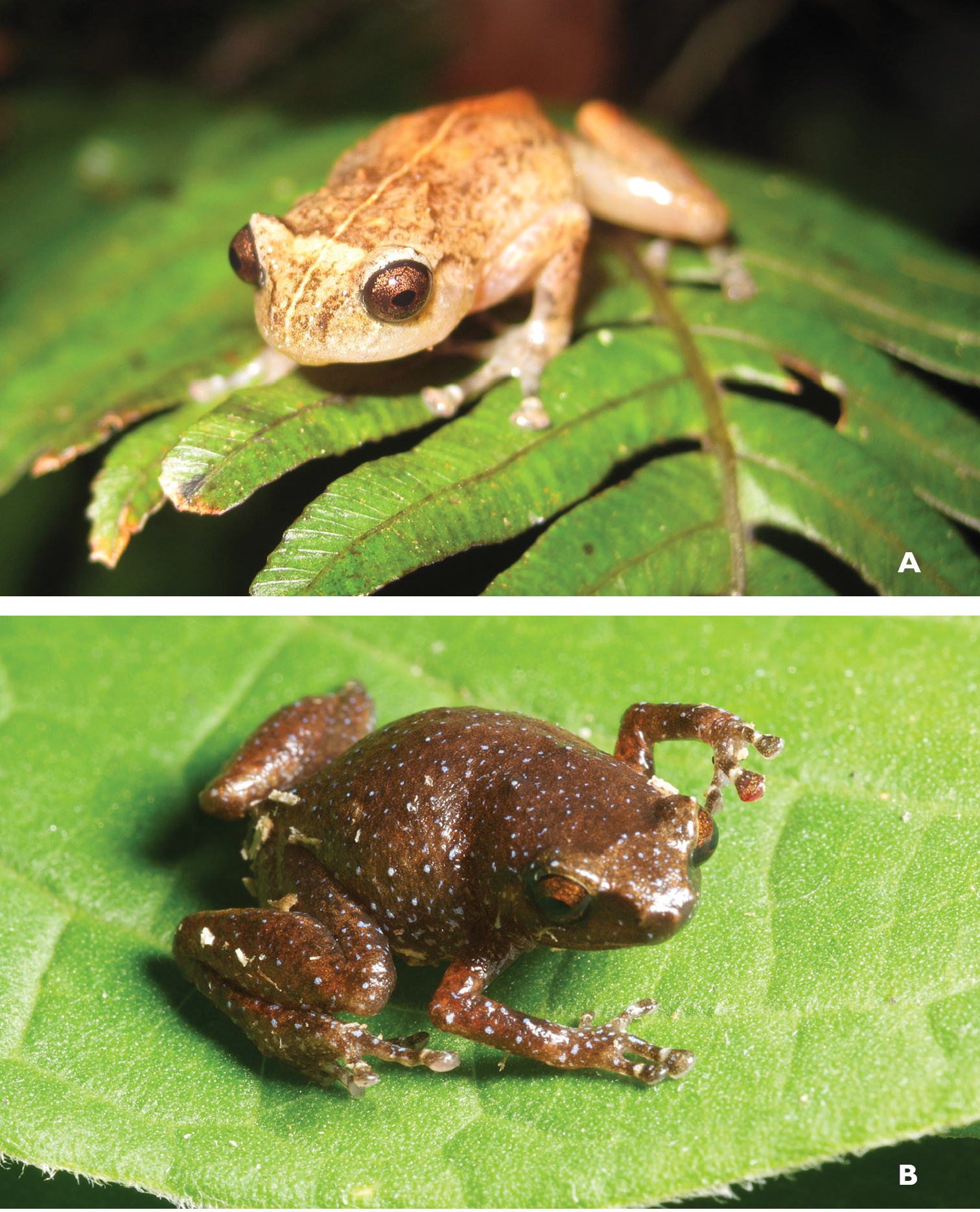
- Aphantophryne cf. nana males from Mindanao

Scientific classification
- Domain: Eukaryota
- Kingdom: Animalia
- Phylum: Chordata
- Class: Amphibia
- Order: Anura
- Family: Microhylidae
- Subfamily: Asterophryinae
- Genus: Aphantophryne; Fry, 1917

Type species
- Aphantophryne pansa Fry, 1917 "1916"

Species
- 5 species (see text)

= Aphantophryne =

Genus of amphibians

Aphantophryne is a genus of microhylid frogs found in New Guinea and in Mindanao, the Philippines. Originally described by Fry in 1917, Richard G. Zweifel considered in 1956 Aphantophryne synonymous to Cophixalus. The genus was resurrected in 1989 to house two new species in addition to the type species, A. pansa. A molecular study on the subfamily Asterophryinae in 2017 revealed that two species originally included in the genus Oreophryne were more closely related to Aphantophryne than to other Oreophryne, and were consequently moved to this genus. The study also revealed a number of undescribed species.

== Description ==
Aphantophryne are small frogs, the maximum snout-to-vent body length is 31 mm for A. pansa and 24 mm for A. sabini. The smallest species A. minuta has the body length of only 12 mm. Females are larger than males. The distinguishing feature of Aphantophryne when compared to other genyophrynine genera is the number of presacral vertebrae: Aphantophryne has seven while the other genera have eight.

== Species ==
The genus has five recognized species:

Binomial name and author	Common name
Aphantophryne minuta Zweifel and Parker, 1989	Myola Guinea frog
Aphantophryne nana (Brown and Alcala, 1967)	Camiguin cross frog, volcano cross frog
Aphantophryne pansa Fry, 1917	Scratchley Guinea frog
Aphantophryne parkeri (Loveridge, 1955)	Parker's cross frog
Aphantophryne sabini Zweifel and Parker, 1989	Guest house Guinea frog

The true number of species is higher, considering the molecularly identified but as yet undescribed species, and the deep divergence of lineages in Aphantophryne pansa, suggestive of a species complex rather than a single species.
