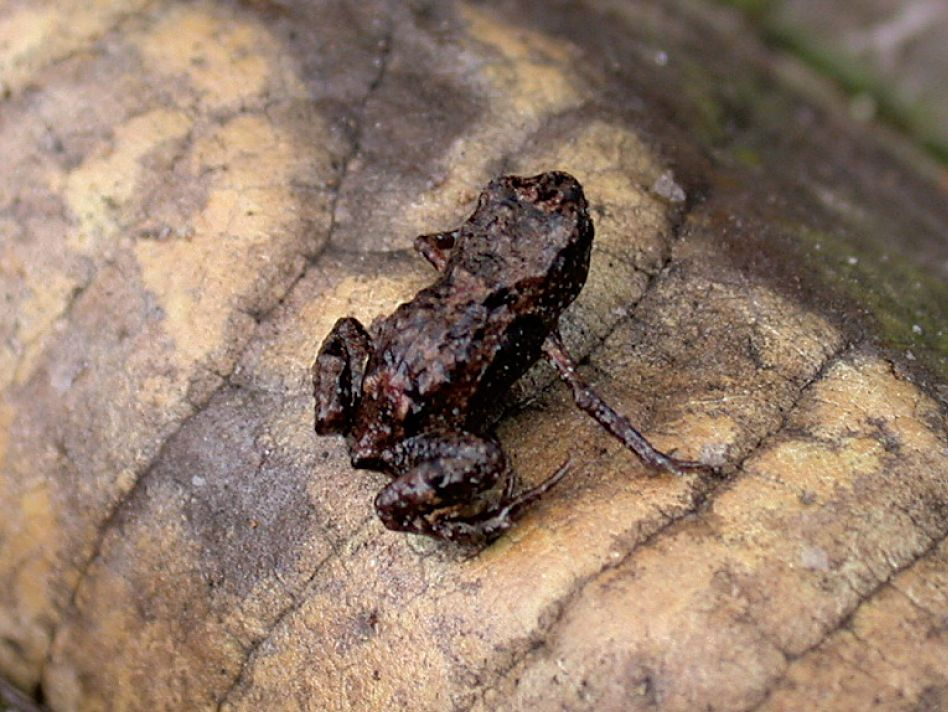
- Paedophryne kathismaphlox

Scientific classification
- Kingdom: Animalia
- Phylum: Chordata
- Class: Amphibia
- Order: Anura
- Family: Microhylidae
- Subfamily: Asterophryinae
- Genus: Paedophryne; Kraus, 2010

= Paedophryne =

Genus of amphibians

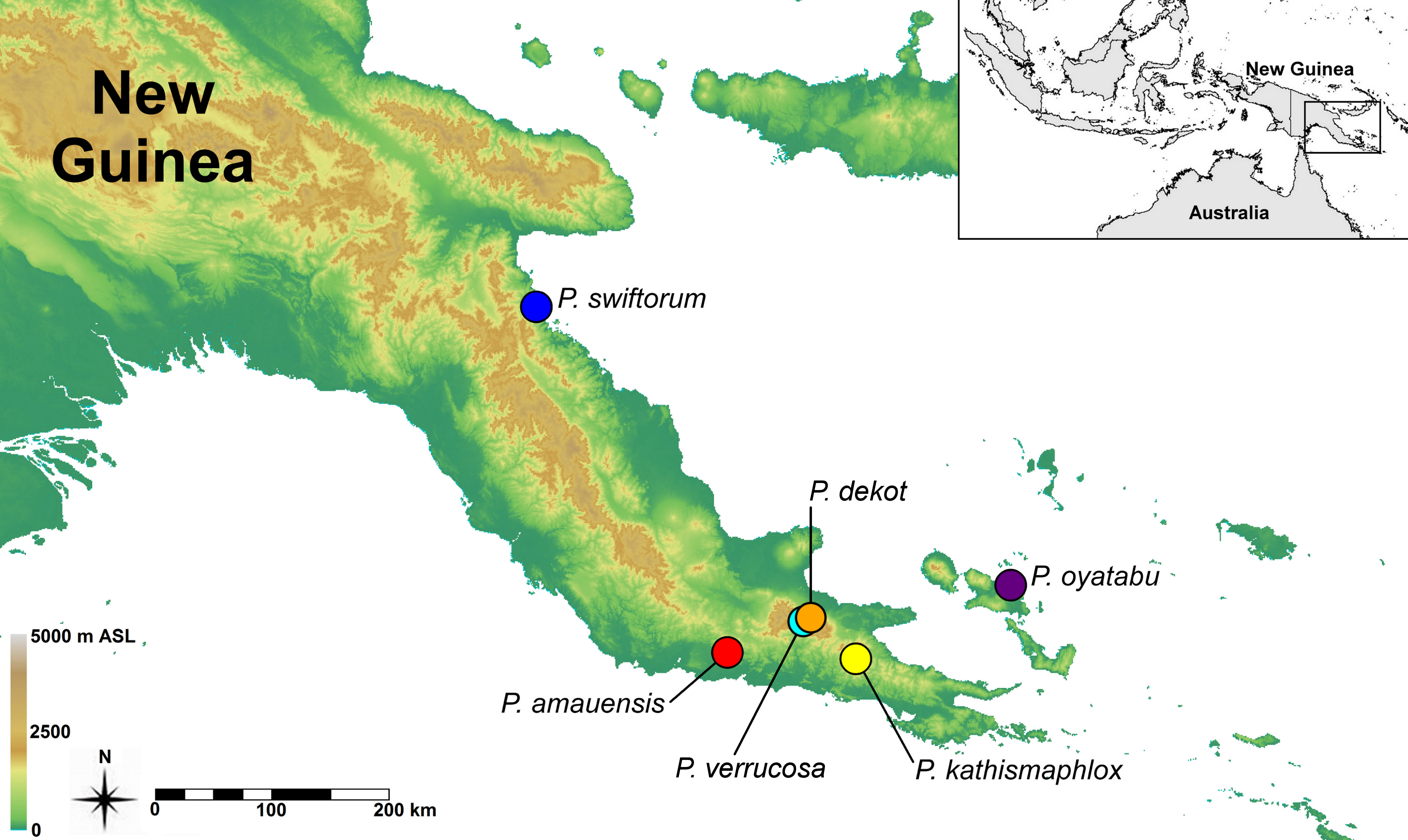
Map of localities where Paedophryne specimens have been found (P. titan from Normanby Island, not shown)

Paedophryne (from the Ancient Greek paedos (παίδος) "child" and phryne (φρύνος) "toad, frog") is a genus of microhylid frogs from Papua New Guinea, including D'Entrecasteaux Islands. All seven species known so far are amongst the smallest frog and vertebrate species.

== Species ==
The following species are recognised in the genus Paedophryne:

- Paedophryne amauensis Rittmeyer et al., 2012
- Paedophryne dekot Kraus, 2011
- Paedophryne kathismaphlox Kraus, 2010
- Paedophryne oyatabu Kraus, 2010
- Paedophryne swiftorum Rittmeyer et al., 2012
- Paedophryne titan Kraus, 2015
- Paedophryne verrucosa Kraus, 2011

== Gallery ==
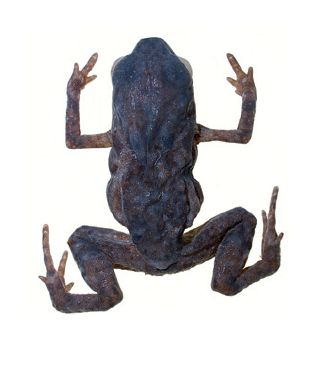
Paedophryne kathismaphlox

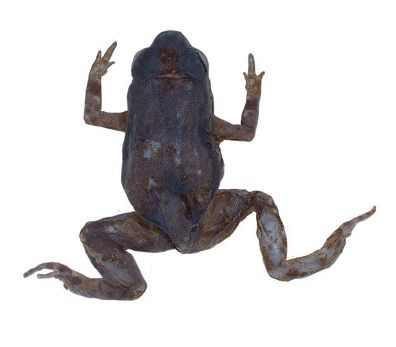
Paedophryne oyatabu

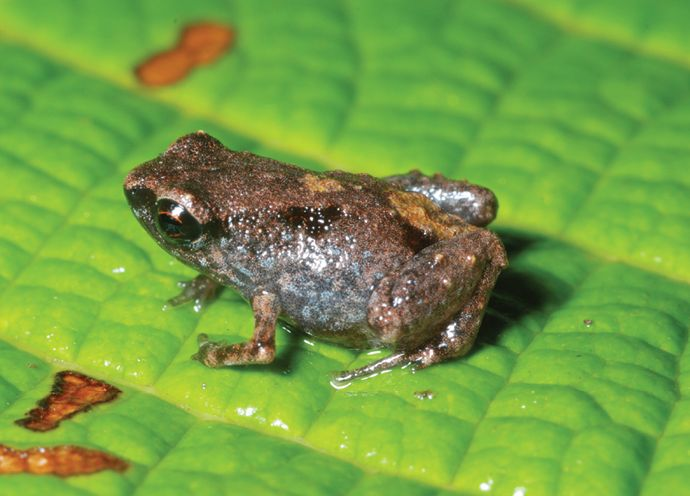
Paedophryne dekot

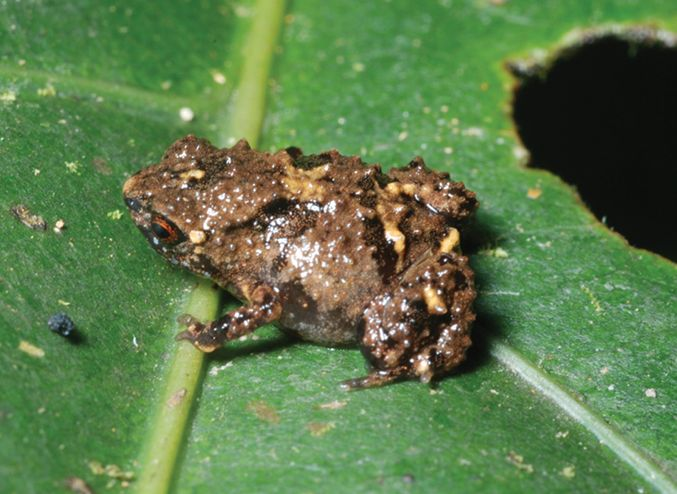
Paedophryne verrucosa

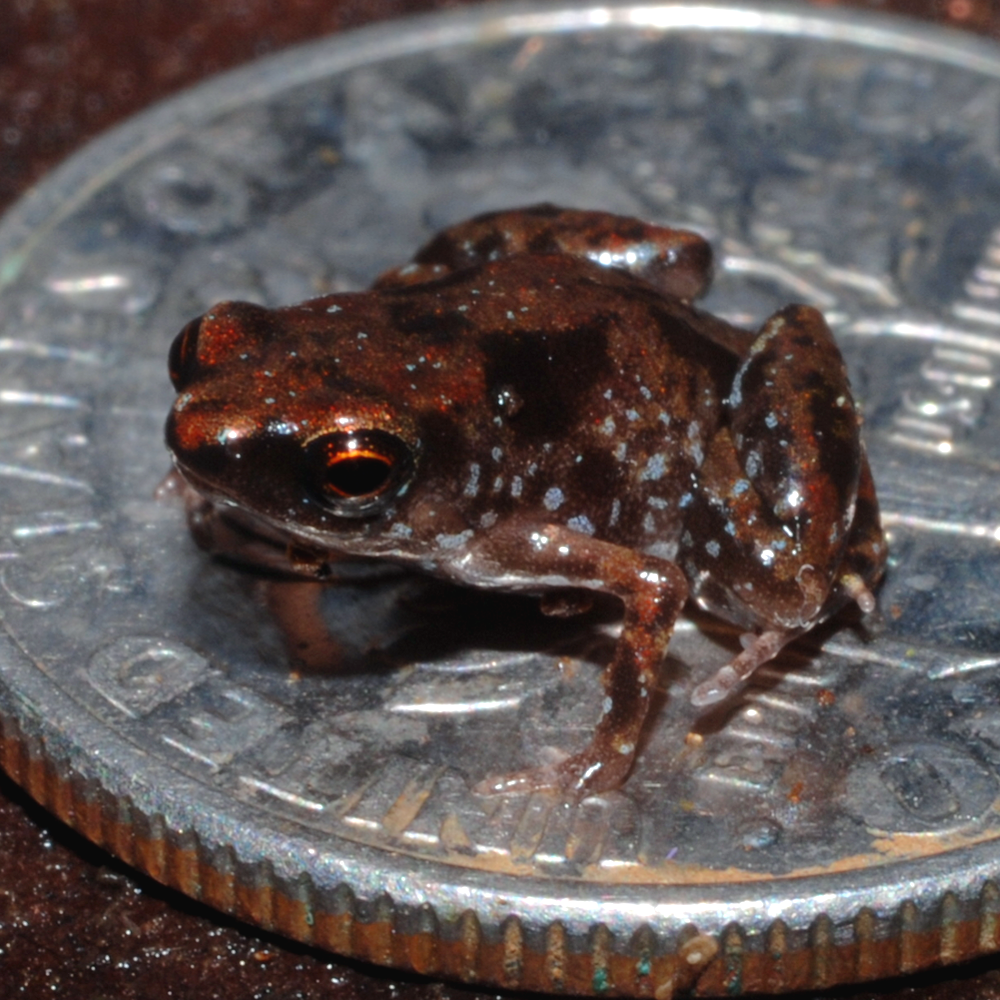
Paedophryne amauensis on a dime

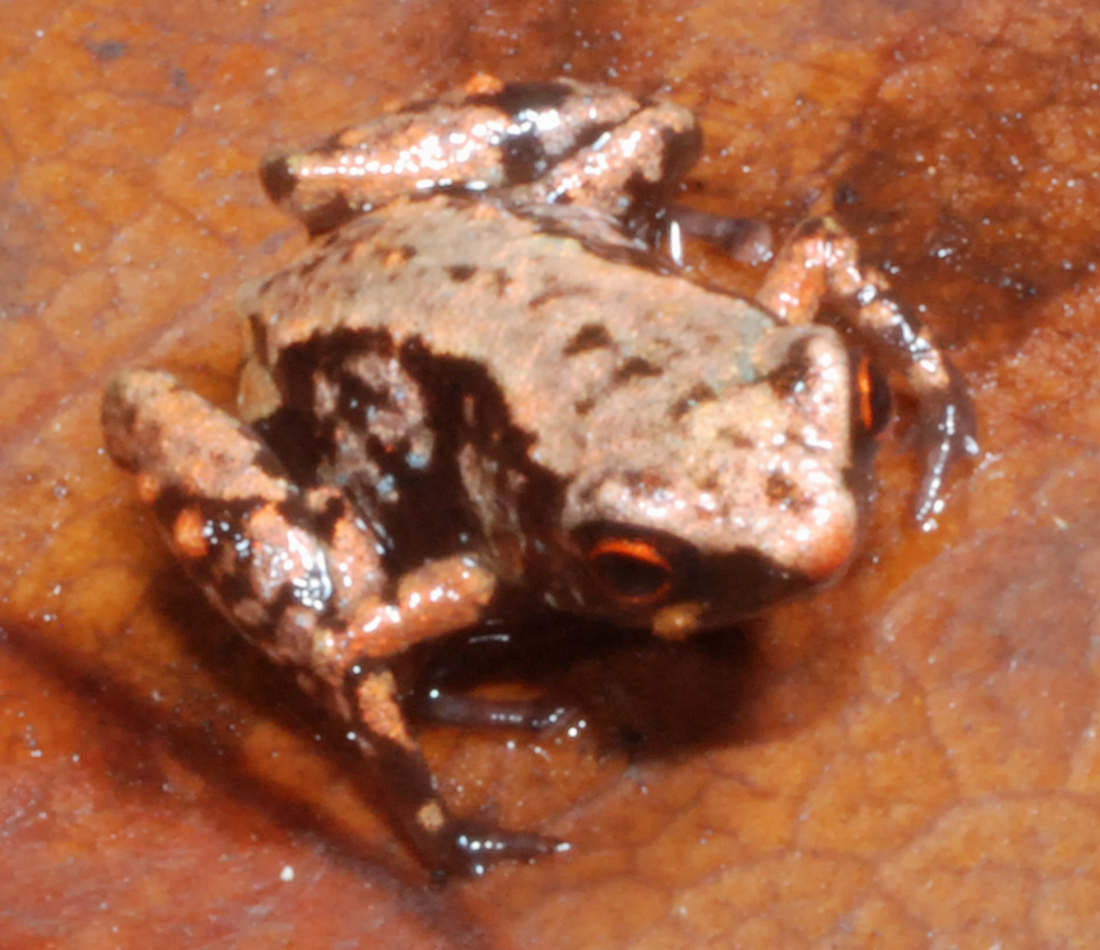
Paedophryne swiftorum

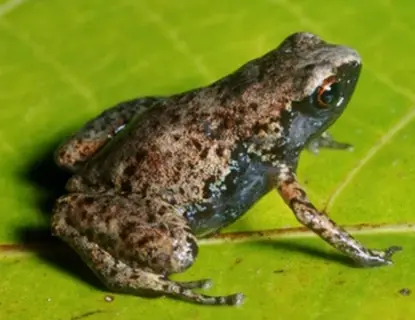
Paedophryne titan
