= Paedocypris micromegethes =

Conservation status
- Vulnerable (IUCN 3.1)

Scientific classification
- Kingdom: Animalia
- Phylum: Chordata
- Class: Actinopterygii
- Order: Cypriniformes
- Suborder: Cyprinoidei
- Family: Paedocyprididae
- Genus: Paedocypris
- Species: P. micromegethes

Binomial name
- Paedocypris micromegethes Kottelat, Britz, H. H. Tan & K. E. Witte, 2006

Species of fish

Paedocypris micromegethes, the Malaysian paedocypris, is a species of cyprinid fish endemic to Sarawak in East Malaysia, where it is found in peat swamps. It is one of the smallest vertebrates in the world, with females reaching a maximum size of 11.6 mm.
