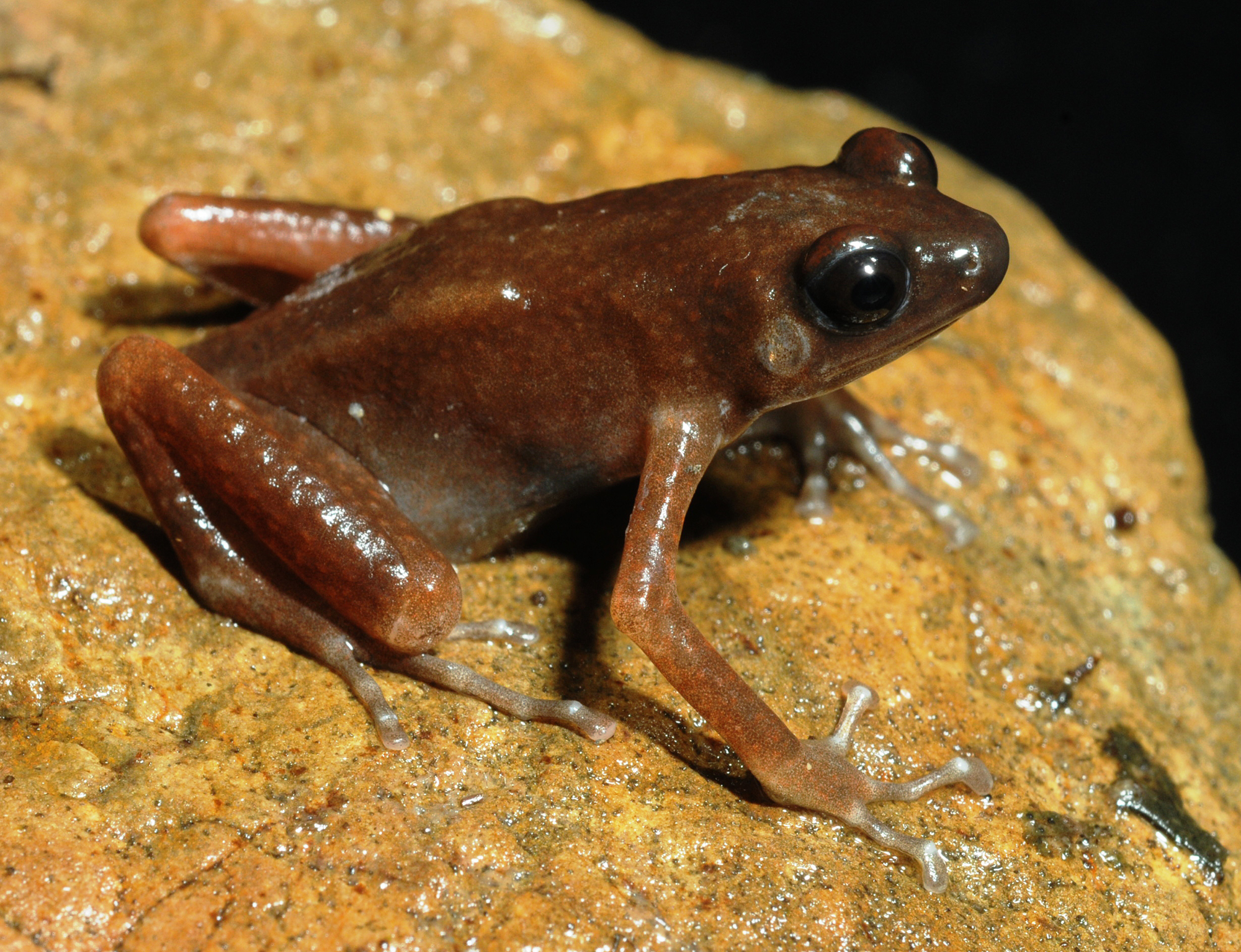
- A male Siamophryne troglodytes

Conservation status
- Critically Endangered (IUCN 3.1)

Scientific classification
- Kingdom: Animalia
- Phylum: Chordata
- Class: Amphibia
- Order: Anura
- Family: Microhylidae
- Subfamily: Asterophryinae
- Genus: Siamophryne; Suwannapoom, Sumontha, Tunprasert, Ruangsuwan, Pawangkhanant, Korost & Poyarkov, 2018
- Species: S. troglodytes

Binomial name
- Siamophryne troglodytes Suwannapoom, Sumontha, Tunprasert, Ruangsuwan, Pawangkhanant, Korost & Poyarkov, 2018

= Siamophryne =

Species of frog

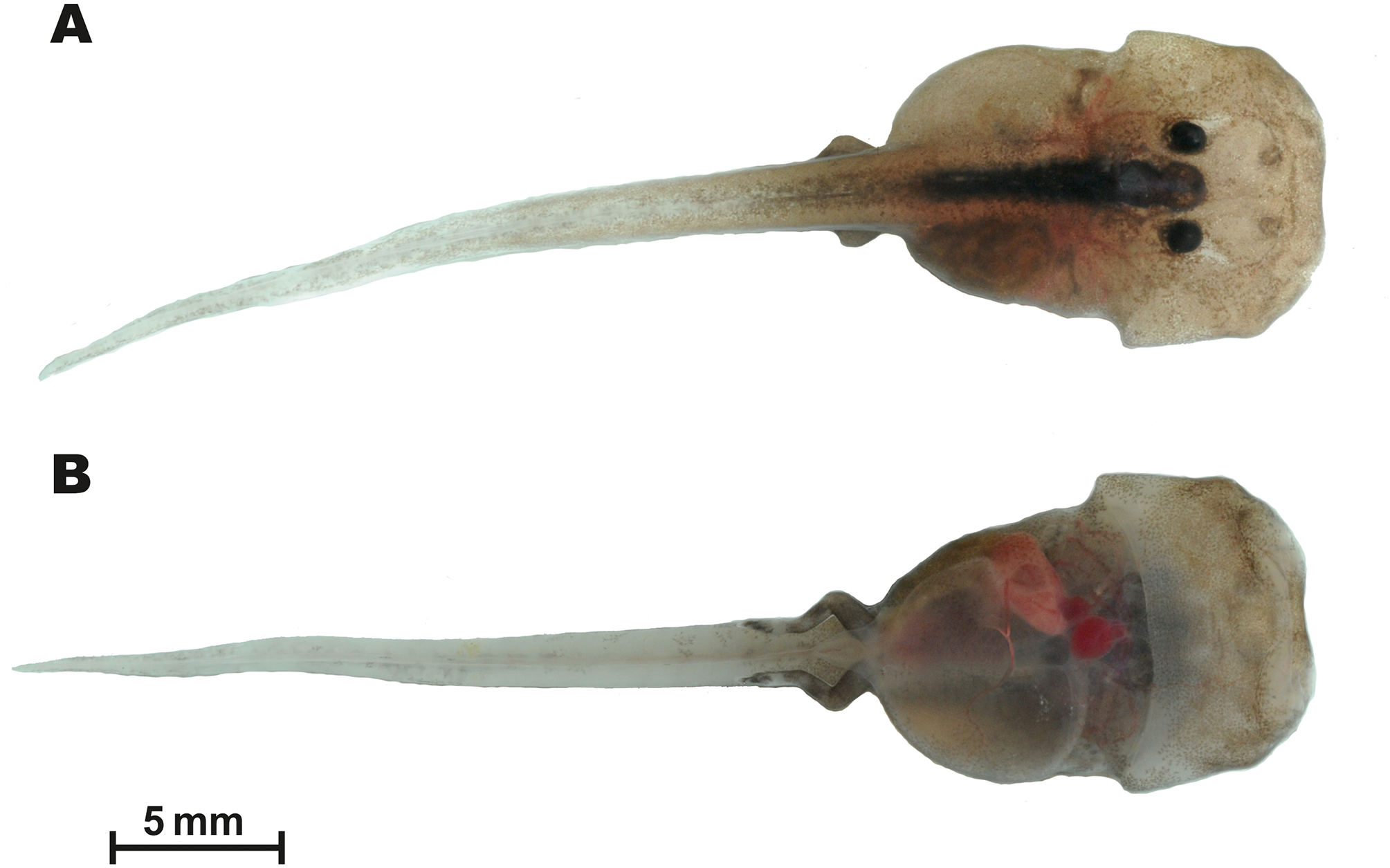
S. troglodytes tadpole

Siamophryne is a genus of frog found in Thailand. It is monotypic, consisting of only one species, the Tenasserim cave frog (Siamophryne troglodytes). Its closest relative is the genus Vietnamophryne.

The genus Siamophryne was first described by Suwannapoom, et al. (2018).

== Ecology ==
S. troglodytes is known only from a single limestone cave system in Sai Yok District, Kanchanaburi Province, western Thailand. There are several species of guano-producing bats inhabiting the cave system. The ecology of the cave is affected by local guano mining.

== Evolutionary history ==
The basal positions of the genera Vietnamophryne and Siamophryne within the subfamily Asterophryinae point to the origin of the subfamily in Indochina, with dispersals into Australasia occurring subsequently.

== See also ==
- Tenasserim Hills, its namesake
