= Aphantophryne pansa =

Conservation status
- Least Concern (IUCN 3.1)

Scientific classification
- Kingdom: Animalia
- Phylum: Chordata
- Class: Amphibia
- Order: Anura
- Family: Microhylidae
- Genus: Aphantophryne
- Species: A. pansa

Binomial name
- Aphantophryne pansa Fry, 1917

Synonyms
- Cophixalus pansus — Zweifel, 1956

Species of frog

Aphantophryne pansa is a species of frog in the family Microhylidae. It is endemic to Papua New Guinea. Its natural habitat is subtropical or tropical high-altitude grassland.
