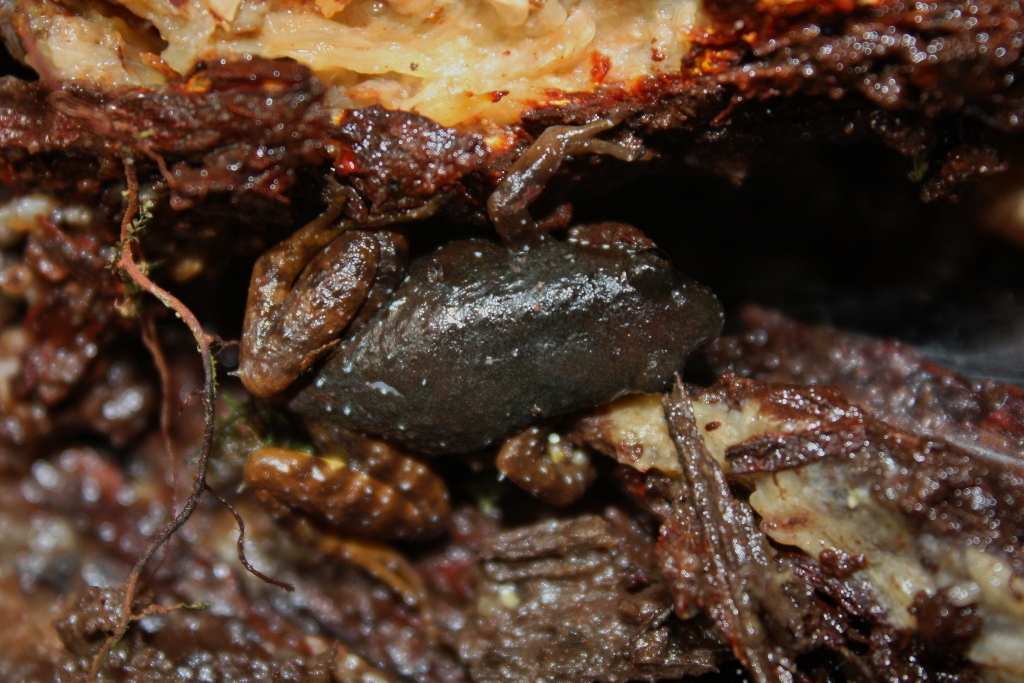

Conservation status
- Least Concern (IUCN 3.1)

Scientific classification
- Kingdom: Animalia
- Phylum: Chordata
- Class: Amphibia
- Order: Anura
- Family: Microhylidae
- Subfamily: Chaperininae
- Genus: Chaperina; Mocquard, 1892
- Species: C. fusca

Binomial name
- Chaperina fusca Mocquard, 1892

Synonyms
- Chaperina beyeri Taylor, 1920; Microhyla leucostigma Boulenger, 1899; Nectophryne picturata Smith, 1921

= Chaperina =

Genus of amphibians

Chaperina fusca

Chaperina is a genus of frogs in the family Microhylidae. It is the only genus in the subfamily Chaperininae. It is also itself monotypic, being represented by the single species, Chaperina fusca, commonly known as the brown thorny frog, spiny-heeled froglet, and saffron-bellied frog. It is found on the Malay Peninsula, in Borneo and in the Philippines (Palawan, Mindanao, and Jolo islands). It is abundant in Borneo but uncommon on the Malay Peninsula and patchily distributed in the Philippines.

== Description ==
Chaperina fusca are small frogs: males measure 18–21 mm (0.71–0.83 in) in snout–vent length and females 20–26 mm (0.79–1.02 in). They are black above with minute white, light blue, or greenish spots. The skin is smooth with scattered tubercles; they have a sharp dermal projection on elbows and heel.

These frogs are active after rainfall on forest floor and low vegetation; they are good climbers.

== Habitat and conservation ==
Its natural habitats are primary lowland and montane rainforests as well as edge habitats; it has also been found in rural gardens. It breeds in small, temporary water bodies rich in decaying organic matter.

Threats to this species include deforestation, habitat conversion to agriculture, and pollution.
