= Gastrophrynoides =

Scientific classification
- Domain: Eukaryota
- Kingdom: Animalia
- Phylum: Chordata
- Class: Amphibia
- Order: Anura
- Family: Microhylidae
- Subfamily: Asterophryinae
- Genus: Gastrophrynoides; Noble, 1926

Type species
- Engystoma borneense Boulenger, 1897

Species
- 2 species (see text)

Genus of amphibians

Gastrophrynoides is a small genus of microhylid frogs. There are two species known from the Malay Peninsula and Borneo. Common name Borneo narrowmouth toads has been coined for the genus.

== Species ==
There are two recognized species:

Binomial name and authority	Common name
Gastrophrynoides borneensis (Boulenger, 1897)	Borneo narrowmouth toad
Gastrophrynoides immaculatus Chan, Grismer, Norhayati, and Daicus, 2009	Tung's narrow-mouthed frog
