= Adelastes =

Neblina Frog

Conservation status
- Data Deficient (IUCN 3.1)

Scientific classification
- Kingdom: Animalia
- Phylum: Chordata
- Class: Amphibia
- Order: Anura
- Family: Microhylidae
- Subfamily: Adelastinae
- Genus: Adelastes; Zweifel, 1986
- Species: A. hylonomos

Binomial name
- Adelastes hylonomos Zweifel, 1986

Synonyms
- Adelastes hylonomus

Genus of amphibians

Adelastes is a genus of frogs in the family Microhylidae. It is the only genus in the subfamily Adelastinae and is also itself monotypic, being represented by the single species, Adelastes hylonomos, commonly known as the Neblina frog.

It is found in Venezuela and possibly Brazil. Its natural habitat is subtropical or tropical moist lowland forests. It is threatened by habitat loss.
