= Vietnamophryne =

Scientific classification
- Kingdom: Animalia
- Phylum: Chordata
- Class: Amphibia
- Order: Anura
- Family: Microhylidae
- Subfamily: Asterophryinae
- Genus: Vietnamophryne; Poyarkov, Suwannapoom, Pawangkhanant, Aksornneam, Duong, Korost and Che, 2018

Genus of frogs

Vietnamophryne (common name: Indochinese dwarf frogs; Vietnamese: nhái lùn; Thai: ueng tham khrae, อึ่งถ้ำแคระ) is a divergent genus of Asterophryinae frogs found in Indochina. Its closest relative is the genus Siamophryne. The genus Vietnamophryne was first described by Poyarkov, et al. (2018).

== Species ==
There are three species, described in 2018:

- Vietnamophryne inexpectata Poyarkov, Suwannapoom, Pawangkhanant, Aksornneam, Duong, Korost, and Che, 2018
- Vietnamophryne orlovi Poyarkov, Suwannapoom, Pawangkhanant, Aksornneam, Duong, Korost, and Che, 2018
- Vietnamophryne occidentalis Poyarkov, Suwannapoom, Pawangkhanant, Aksornneam, Duong, Korost, and Che, 2018

In 2021 the descriptions of two species were added:

- Vietnamophryne cuongi Nguyen, Hoang, Jiang, Orlov, Ninh, Nguyen, Nguyen, and Ziegler, 2021
- Vietnamophryne vuquangensis Hoang, Jiang, Nguyen, Orlov, Le, Nguyen, Nguyen, Nguyen, Nguyen, and Ziegler, 2021

== Type localities ==
Type localities of each species:

- Vietnamophryne cuongi in Ba Vi National Park, Hanoi, northern Vietnam,
- Vietnamophryne inexpectata in Kon Chu Rang Nature Reserve, Gia Lai Province, central Vietnam.
- Vietnamophryne orlovi in Phia Oac-Phia Den National Park, Cao Bang Province, northern Vietnam.
- Vietnamophryne occidentalis in Doi Tung Mountain, Chiang Rai Province, northern Thailand.
- Vietnamophryne vuquangensis in Vu Quang National Park, Ha Tinh Province, Vietnam near to the Laos border.
