= Schindleria praematura =

Conservation status
- Least Concern (IUCN 3.1)

Scientific classification
- Kingdom: Animalia
- Phylum: Chordata
- Class: Actinopterygii
- Order: Gobiiformes
- Family: Gobiidae
- Genus: Schindleria
- Species: S. praematura

Binomial name
- Schindleria praematura Schindler, 1930

Synonyms
- Hemiramphus praematurus Schindler, 1930

Species of fish

Schindleria praematura, Schindler's fish is a species of neotenic goby which was formerly placed in the monogeneric family Schindleriidae but which is currently classified within the Gobiidae. It is associated with reefs and has an Indo-Pacific distribution from South Africa and Madagascar to Hawaii and the sea mounts of the South Pacific. The generic name and the common name honour the German zoologist Otto Schindler (1906–1959), who described the species. Schindleria praematura's entire body, including the head, is uniformly whitish. The iris of the eye is black and capped dorsally with an iridescent silvery layer spotted with numerous melanophores. The black pigment cap on the swim bladder is visible through the body wall, and their fins are translucent. Schindleria praematura is also notable for its small size. They are the world's smallest and fastest maturing marine vertebrates and are likely the most extreme case of paedomorphism among teleost fishes. Adult S. praematura have an average body length of around 10–20 mm resembling the body length of most fishes' early larval stage.

== Taxonomy ==
Schindler (1930) described the first species from the Hawaiian Islands as Hemiramphus praematurus because he assumed that the species was a larval hemiramphid. The second species—also described by Schindler (1931)—was observed from the Hawaiian Islands and described as Hemiramphus pietschmanni. Giltay (1934) found a single specimen of H. praematurus off New Guinea and concluded that the species did not show a close relation to other known hemiramphids. He therefore combined both species Schindler found into a new genus called Schindleria and a new family Schindleriidae. And the third species, Schindleria brevipinguis, was described by Watson and Walker (2004) off north-eastern Australia To date, these three species along with eight others (totaling 11 species) are the only described members of the family, although studies have suggested that this family probably contains many species that have yet to be discovered and classified. However, the classification of Schindleria praematura moved from the family Schindleriidae to the family Gobiidae in 2009 based on the molecular phylogenetic study and was later supported by Nelson's et al.'s classification in 2016. Schindleriidae is also a member of the suborder Gobioidei.

== Morphological description ==
Schindleria (Gobiidae) are the world's smallest and fastest maturing marine vertebrates. They are likely the most extreme case of paedomorphism among teleost fishes. Adult S. praematura have an average body length of around 10–20 mm resembling the body length of most fishes' early larval stage. Some of the larval characteristics observed in sexually mature individuals include functional pronephros (most primitive form of a kidney for excretory organ functions), a transparent body and a largely unossified skeleton (not yet converted to bone or lacking a bony structure).

Identification of the species as Schindleria praematura (Schindler) is based on diagnostic features including but not limited to 13 segmented caudal rays, the gut extending to about two-thirds of the standard length, between 18 and 22 dorsal fin rays, and 11 to 14 anal fin rays, which originate immediately behind the urogenital opening. The entire body, including the head, is uniformly whitish, elongated, and compressed. The average length of head is about 10.5% of the total length. The black pigment cap on the swim bladder is visible through the body wall, and their fins are translucent. The iris of the eye is black and capped dorsally with an iridescent silvery layer spotted with numerous melanophores. Eye diameter is about equal to the length of the snout, 25% in head length, and two or three rows of small teeth are present in the jaws. S. praematura are sexually dimorphic. Among females, the most distinctive feature is the pre-dorsal fin length and the caudal fin length, while among males, the snout length was overall most distinctive. There were different urogenital papilla (UG) shape between males and females. Males of S. praematura had a long and narrow UG with the opening on the tip. In female S. praematura, the UG was rounded and shorter compared to the males’, but was distinctly wider and had two narrow projections laterally to the UG opening.

== Distribution ==
Schindleriidae, a family of small, paedomorphic, marine gobioid fishes (Johnson & Brothers, 1993), is widely distributed in warm-water reef habitats of the Indian and Pacific Oceans Schindleria's biogeographic range is extremely large, inhabiting a wide range of environmentally very different tropical waters at and off coral reefs, from the submarine ridges of Nazca and Sala y Gomez, off of South America, to Hawaii, South Africa, and the Red Sea. But more specifically, Schindleria praematura is confined to Indo-West Pacific coral reefs and is distributed from southern Japan and the South China Sea to the Great Barrier Reef (Australia), Papua New Guinea, Palau and the Marshall Islands. This species has also been observed at Easter Island, Madagascar in the western Indian Ocean and Southern African regions inside the Kosi Mouth Estuary, KwaZulu-Natal South Africa. Additionally, the first record of the species in the Red Sea was made by El-Regal and Kon, 2019 which significantly extends the known distribution of this species northward in the Indo-West Pacific.

== Biology and behavior ==
Mature S. praematura displays some characters which could be regarded as larval (linear form of heart, lack of surface body pigment, developing vertebral column) and others which are debatably larval (pronephros, small body size). Depending on how the combination of larval and sexual characters are viewed Schindleria might be described as either paedogenetic (essentially larvae with precocious gonads) or neotenic (adults in which larval characters have been retained- called peadomorphosis) with often the latter being described in most literature. Schindleria praematura is unusual among gobies in that it is planktonic; not only does it retain a larval morphology, but it also exhibits a larval ecology, never settling out of the plankton as do most gobies. Schindleria praematura populations have been recorded near islands in the tropical Pacific and Indian oceans, not too far out in open waters, and perform the diel migrations typical of plankton, rising to the surface at night to feed and returning to the bottom during the day. Schindleria praematura primarily feeds on zooplankton. More specifically its diet is known to include small marine invertebrates such as crustaceans, and mollusks. Copepods are a large part of their diet. It feeds in the water column near the seabed on drifting organisms.

Schindleriidae, now referred to as Gobiidae, are one of the few families that can use atoll lagoons throughout their larval stage and are therefore called "lagoon completers". Hence, Schindleria may remain pelagic for most of their very short lifespan of less than three months and may use the reef only during a brief period for reproduction. A study around the Hawaiian island assumes these fish migrate daily around the reef matrix. They move to shallower depths in the lagoons at night. This migration has also been suggested to occur at smaller spatial scales, where vertical daily migrations take place between the epibenthos during the day and the water column during the night. The reason for migration behavior in Schindleria is still unknown, but it is likely that the two species S. praematura and S. pietschemanni differ in their migration behavior and the spatial scale at which migration is taking place around the Hawaiian coasts. S. pietschmanni was found to be more abundant close to shore while S. praematura was more abundant offshore, and the latter was more frequently caught distant from the reef matrix and the former in closer vicinity to the reef. This supports the idea of differing habitat and/or ecology in these two species due to intraspecific competition for limited resources.

=== Swimming Behavior ===
The first description of the swimming behavior of Schindleria was studied by, Robitzch, V., Olivier, D., & Ahnelt, H. (2022). They determined that Schindleria can switch between two swimming modes: the anguilliform—a type of movement used by all fish larvae; and the subcarangiform—a type of movement found in many late larvae and juvenile fishes (Fig. 3). Schindleria also used a "C-start" to initiate swimming or change swimming direction, another typical movement amongst larval fish stages. The pectoral fins were kept close to the body during the movements.

Schindleria may also have a relatively higher anguilliform swimming performance compared to other similar sized fishes, which may be related to its particularly large pectoral fins and its long, less rudimentary dorsal and anal fins in comparison to other larvae. The two median fins may further increase stability, aid against roll, and augment thrust during the anguilliform swimming; overall, increasing speed in Schindleria's anguilliform swimming.

This complex and advanced swimming ability the study recorded in Schindleria, despite its small and progenic body construction, suggest that the development of unique morphological features has been advantageous in this short-lived taxon. Thus, Schindleria must have taken advantage of performing one or the other swimming mode depending on the purpose of the swimming behavior and evolved the ability to switch between them.

For example, subcarangiform swimming may be required for higher swimming speed (during escape or foraging) or the maintenance of swimming speed over prolonged swimming periods (during migrations to coral reefs for reproduction), while the anguilliform mode may be more efficient during slower swimming movements or maneuverability that are less energetically demanding.

Additionally, although it was believed that Schindleria spent most of its time in reefs, Robitzch, V., Olivier, D., & Ahnelt, H. (2022) suggests that due to morphological features such as body shape, its small size, its paedomorphic nature, and low Reynold's number this fish may favor anguilliform swimming to remain in the water column and migrate long distances in the pelagic zone while being energy efficient. Thus, many Schindleria may remain pelagic for most of their very short lifespan (of less than three months) and may use the reef only during a brief period of a few days for reproduction. On the other hand, fast swimming speeds are easier to reach with a subcarangiform swimming, for which Schindleria may have evolved its unique teleost structures and further developed few of its rudimentary fins despite progenesis.

== Reproduction ==
The extremely paedomorphic bony fish Schindleria includes one of the lightest, smallest, and youngest reproducing (23 days, 10 generations per year) vertebrate species. In this species, gonads are well developed at body length of about 20 mm for females and 15 mm for males and contain large ova and even free spermatozoa. The small size of the otoliths in relation to the standard body length indicates that S. praematura is a fast-growing fish. The small number of otolith rings in the larger individuals also suggests a short lifespan (probably no more than 2 or 3 months), possibly associated with the extreme paedomorphism of the species.

Schindleria has been called ‘the most extreme example of progenetic developmental truncation known among fishes. In Schindleria, every aspect of morphology is juvenilized: the body is transparent and scaleless, the heart is tubular with the atrium posterior to the ventricle, the kidney is pronephric, and the gills and the gut are simplified. Schindleria praematura gonad structure is a significantly different from the other species in the genus. In S. praematura, the paedomorphic morphology includes changes in the gonads and accessory structures of both males and females which include the following: The ovaries of S. praematura differ in many respects from the other gobioid species. In the ovary, the stromal tissue is reduced, there is a single chamber rather than a series of ovigerous folds, and the oogonia are restricted to a germinal ridge at the ventral margin of the ovary. Reduction to this degree is unknown among teleosts, but a germinal ridge has previously been observed in the seahorses. Similarly, the testis of S. praematura differs greatly from the typical perciform testis and from the other gobioids examined. The testis of S. praematura is a single, slender and elongate organ with paired extensions continuing from both the anterior and posterior ends.

Observed simplifications in the S. praematura testis include a drastic reduction in the amount of interstitial tissue, reduction in the extent of secretory tissue in the sperm duct gland, and compression and reduction in number of the spermatogenic lobules. The testicular units are lobules, rather than tubules, as indicated by the lack of anastomoses and termination of the lobules at the testis periphery. The lobules in S. praematura are unusual in that they are so tightly packed in the testis that there is no lumen present. This condition was interpreted by Grier et al. (1980) as a modified restricted testis, with spermatogonia restricted to the distal termini of the lobules. The reduced gonad morphology seen in S. praematura does not appear to have any effect on its ability to produce gametes; the oocytes and spermatozoa observed were not absolutely smaller or more reduced in complexity than those in other goby species. Males have a simplified form of the gobioid sperm duct gland. Reports have observed fresher specimens’ sperm duct gland to be full of a darkly staining secretion.

In some other gobies, this secretion functions to adhere spermatozoa to a substratum on which the eggs are laid. Gobies are oviparous and deposit eggs in a nest or on some other substratum such as shells, rocks, algal filaments, or the burrows of other animals. The eggs adhere to the substratum. Then gobies deposit a sperm trail or ribbon as the eggs are deposited, and fertilization occurs. Schindleria praematura females produce relatively few (10–11) but relatively large eggs compared to their body size. Final oocyte maturation (germinal vesicle migration and breakdown) was observed only in S. praematura. No sperm were found in any of the ovaries examined, nor is there any other evidence of internal fertilization. There is also no evidence of accessory gonadal structure primordia (AGS) on the ovaries which would indicate the potential for sex change.

Schindleria display the characteristics of small fish species occurring in retention areas (coral atoll lagoons and estuaries) such as small adult size, limited number of adult guilds, non-specialized larvae, and non-pelagic eggs. The spawning period of Schindleria in the northern hemisphere appears to be between December and May, and in the southern hemisphere from October to December. It seems that this species spawns in most months of the year due to their quick reproduction rates and short life spans.

== Conservation status ==
Because of their small size, transparent bodies, and rapid reproductive cycles, Schindleria are seen as cryptic and mostly overlooked. They are not harmful to humans and are not widely consumed. However, Schindleria is both highly abundant and likely the most numerous coral reef fish on the planet. Therefore, morphological differences may be a good strategy to increase the span of resources/niches available in heavily populated ecosystems such as the Hawaiian coral reefs. Schindleria praematura has most recently been assessed for The IUCN Red List of Threatened Species in 2024. Schindleria praematura is listed as Least Concern.
