= Otto Schindler (zoologist) =

German zoologist and ichthyologist

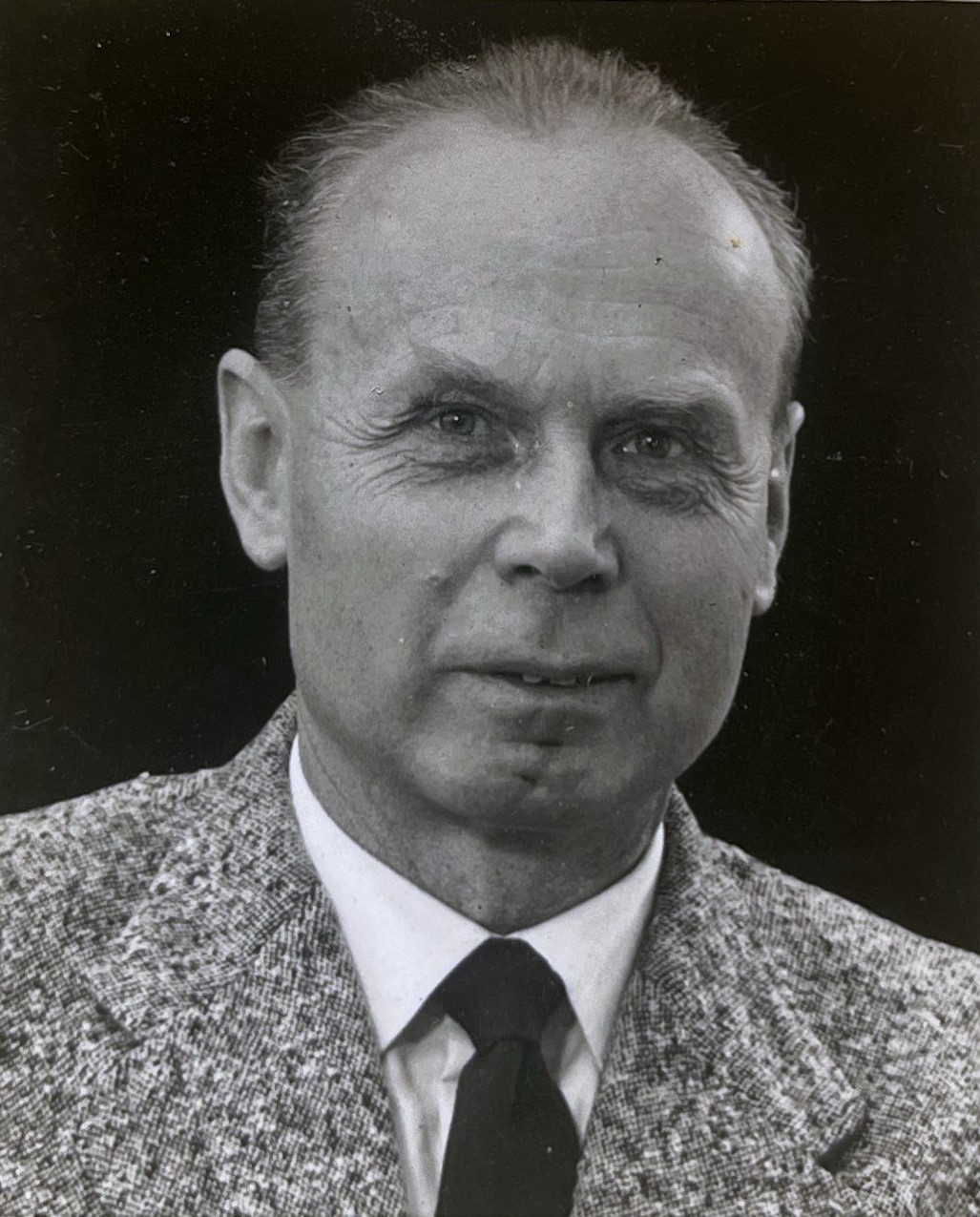

Otto Schindler (1 December 1906 – 4 September 1959) was a German zoologist who specialised in ichthyology.

== Early life ==
Schindler was born to Otto Schindler and Gabriele Schindler (née Pietschmann), spending most of his childhood in Vienna and the Sudetenland. After graduating Gymnasium Stubenbastei, Schindler attended the University of Vienna, where he received a doctorate in 1930.

== Career ==
In 1931 he joined the Bavarian State Collection of Zoology (Zoologische Staatssammlung München) as an assistant curator of ichthyology, to work on the specimens collected by the III German Grand Chaco Expedition to East Paraguay. In 1937 he joined the IV expedition to Brazil which lasted 6 months. After the Second World War he was appointed Curator of Ichthyology and restored and ordered the collection of fish which had survived the war. It is known that he visited Stockholm in the 1950s, bringing some specimens from the museums there back to Munich. He also obtained specimens from Vienna as part of his efforts to rebuild the ZSM collection. He returned to South America in 1953-54, travelling to Bolivia with Walter Forster; during this expedition Schindler was appointed to negotiate the fishing quotas on Lake Titicaca with Peru by the Bolivian Ministry of Agriculture; the Peruvian negotiator was fellow German zoologist Hans-Wilhelm Koepcke. He collected many specimens from Lake Titicaca and he sampled in the vicinity of Cochabamba and in the Amazon lowlands with the amateur lepidopterist Rudolf Zischka.

During the expeditions he collected the types of Aphyocharacidium bolivianum, Oligosarcus schindleri and Characidium schindleri. Schindler has the goby genus Schindleria named after him. He described the type species as Hemipramphus praematurus and Louis Pierre Giltay raised the genus Schindleria for this distinctive fish in 1934.

== Personal life ==
Schindler married Maria Petsch in 1939 and had three children with her. He died on 4 September 1959 during a study trip in Poitiers, France.
