= Oninia =

Scientific classification
- Kingdom: Animalia
- Phylum: Chordata
- Class: Amphibia
- Order: Anura
- Family: Microhylidae
- Genus: Oninia; Günther, Stelbrink & von Rintelen, 2010

Genus of amphibians

Oninia is a genus of frogs belonging to the family Microhylidae.

The species of this genus are found in New Guinea.

== Species ==
Species:

- Oninia senglaubi Günther, Stelbrink & von Rintelen, 2010
