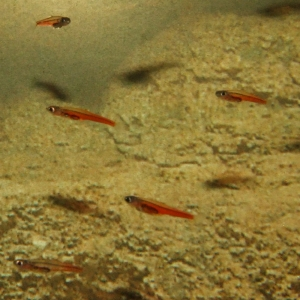

Conservation status
- Near Threatened (IUCN 3.1)

Scientific classification
- Kingdom: Animalia
- Phylum: Chordata
- Class: Actinopterygii
- Order: Cypriniformes
- Suborder: Cyprinoidei
- Family: Paedocyprididae
- Genus: Paedocypris
- Species: P. progenetica

Binomial name
- Paedocypris progenetica Kottelat, Britz, H. H. Tan & K. E. Witte, 2006

= Paedocypris progenetica =

Species of fish

Paedocypris progenetica, also known as the Indonesian superdwarf fish, is a tiny, significantly transparent fish. The binomial name originates from the Greek Paideios, meaning children, and Cypris, meaning Venus, a common suffix for the cyprinid genera. The species is native to Indonesia and Malaysia and found in peat swamps and slow flowing blackwater streams. It was first discovered by Singaporean ichthyologist Heok Hui Tan in 2006.

It is one of the smallest known fish in the world, with a mature adult reaching a length of 6.7mm. It held the record for the shortest known vertebrate until the frog Paedophryne amauensis was formally described in January 2012.

== Species description ==
In life, the species is a translucent orange, with males displaying an iridescent orange spot between the eyes and on the nape. The species has a total length ranging from 6.7mm to 9.6mm with a standard length of 6.1-8.8mm, making it one of the smallest known fish The weight of adults ranges from 0.3 mg to 1.8 mg. and vertebrates. Paeocypris progenetica is known as one of the most developmentally truncated vertebrates, with 61 physical characters affected by developmental truncation. The fish resembles in many ways that of the larval and juvenile stages of its relatives, retaining transparency, a long caudal peduncle, and a lack of frontals protecting the brain. Males have a more complex state, notably exhibiting one of the most extreme instances of skeletal sexual dimorphism. The genus contains a number of unique physical attributes. These include a complex novel structure to the pelvic girdle, hypertrophied (enlarged due to increased cell size) abductor and ventral arrector muscles in males, a pad of keratinized (cells filled with keratin) skin preceding the pelvic fin in males, and a highly modified outermost pelvic-fin ray with the ventral hemitrich significantly expanded and flattened. Traits distinguishing P. progenetica from the rest of its genus include the projection of the keratinized pad, the straight arrangement of breeding tubercles on the dentary, vestigial or often missing pelvic fins in females, and tiny black vermiculations on the belly from throat to anus, among others.

== Systematics and evolution ==
Upon first discovery of two species of the genus in 2006, Paedocypris was placed in the formally recognized family Cyprinidae. As of 2010, Paedocypris has been placed in a new superfamily, Paedocypridoidea, and family, Paedocyprididae. This family includes the three species of Paedocypris: P. progenetica, P. micromegethes, and P. carbunculus. A study in 2007 hypothesized the minimum age of divergence for the genus Paedocypris estimated at ca. 24 MYBP (million years before present). An additional study investigated the evolution of the genus using morphological and molecular analyses to estimate divergence times between species. The study concluded that P. carbunculus diverged first compared to P. micromegethes, then later followed by P. progenetica. It was hypothesized that P. progenetica may have split from its relatives 24.5 MYBP during the late Oligocene.

The genome, like the morphology of Paedocypris, is notably characterized by reduction. The species demonstrates an overall loss in DNA content, with a lower number of chromosomes compared to that of close relatives. Along with a considerable loss of intron sequences, the genome lacks multiple homeobox (HOX) genes and other genes that play critical roles in development.

== Distribution and habitat ==
Paeocypris progenetica is found in tropical Southeast Asia within the Peninsular Malaysia region and on Sumatra and Bintan Island in Indonesia. It is predicted that additional populations of the species will be found with future inventory efforts. They live in blackwater peat swamps, wetlands with waterlogged soils that prevent plant decay forming layers of acidic peat, with highly acidic (pH 3-6), tannin-stained waters. This acidity is due to large amounts of humic acids and other phenolic acids. The water ranges in color from a light tea brown to deep red brown, gradually reaching black, with depths ranging from 10 cm to 3 m. Blackwater peat swamps in Malaysia are some of the richest ichthyofaunal regions in the world. During the dry season, P. progenetica can survive in small animal burrows, shallow pools, and even in the soil, in part thanks to its small size. This survival skill provides considerable advantage when water levels fall during times of drought. In dry periods, the peat acts as a buffer to retain isolated pools of water, and in some cases can sustain permanent creeks.

== Life history ==
It is hypothesized that the many anatomical and morphological sexual dimorphisms in P. progenetica play a role in reproductive behavior. The highly modified pelvic fins with hypertrophied muscles as well as the keratinized pad preceding the pelvic girdle are believed to function as a clasping device. A study in 2018 investigated the egg structure and larval development of Paedocypris carbunculus. Belonging to the same genus, the discoveries may be inferred to apply to P. progenetica as well. The eggs are adhesive, and deposited on the underside of plant leaves. With a smooth surface, the eggs are only 450–500 μm in diameter. Eggs hatch around 36 hours after laying. Freshly hatched larvae measure about 1.6 mm and attach to the substrate using a gular adhesive organ. According to a Dutch study by Perrin and Beyer, P. carbunculus were fed Artemia nauplii (brine shrimp), fine dry food, and rotifers in captivity for breeding. In nature, it is reported that they consume food particles in the size range of 60-500 μm. In Perrin and Beyer's study, they investigated the breeding behavior of P. carbunculus. Reports of the study suggest that males claim mini territories on the underside of leaves. They position themselves upside down under the leaf and wait there for females. It was also observed that male P. carbunculus can emit light signals, and it is suggested that this plays an important role in mate recognition. The current literature does not include research into parental care behavior.

== Conservation status ==
Paedocypris progenetica's population status was most recently assessed in 2019 for The IUCN Red List of Threatened Species. The IUCN listed the species as Near Threatened and declining. There are a number of anthropogenic threats to the species. Ongoing activities in the region such as drainage of standing water, dumping of palm oil and other waste, and conversion to agricultural land contribute to global warming and habitat degradation. Researchers remain concerned about the threat of genetic diversity loss in the limited populations of P. progenetica due to climate change. Further sources highlight that the diverse and structurally complex peat swamp forests are rapidly disappearing in Southeast Asia. Notably, by 2010 Sundaland had lost 60% of its peat swamp forests. From 1990-2010, the proportion of forest cover in the peatlands of Peninsular Malaysia, Sumatra, and Borneo fell from 77% to 36%, creating the potential for all Southwest Asian peat swamp forests to disappear by 2030. Forces driving the land conversion include logging, urbanization, and conversion for agricultural use, frequently palm oil plantations and shrimp farms. The fires of 1997 in Sumatra and Borneo also wiped out a significant amount of peat swamp forests. As demonstrated in Figure 5, the occurrence of fire is especially concentrated in deforested peatland habitats. It is estimated that under a "business-as-usual" (BAU) scenario, land-use change up to 2050 could drive 14-62% of stenotopic peat swamp fish species to extinction in Sundaland. Furthermore, out of 102 stenotopic species in Sundaland's peat swamp forests, BAU models predict an average of 16 species will be extinct globally by 2050. As for the significance of this species, P. progenetica is believed to act as a biological indicator for the quality and condition of peat swamp environments. Notably, the species has made its way into a number of published articles and books for people of all ages due to its record-holding size. For example, in the book "Do Fish Sleep?: Fascinating Answers to Questions about Fishes" Paedocypris progenetica is proclaimed to be the smallest fish in the world.
