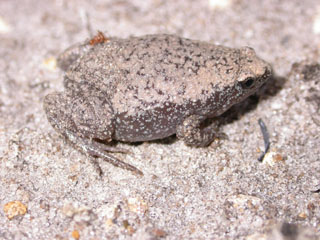
- Eastern narrowmouth toad (Gastrophryne carolinensis)

Scientific classification
- Kingdom: Animalia
- Phylum: Chordata
- Class: Amphibia
- Order: Anura
- Superfamily: Ranoidea
- Family: Microhylidae; Günther, 1858

Subfamilies
- Adelastinae; Asterophryinae; Chaperininae; Cophylinae; Dyscophinae; Gastrophryninae; Hoplophryninae; Kalophryninae; Melanobatrachinae; Microhylinae; Otophryninae; Phrynomerinae; Scaphiophryninae
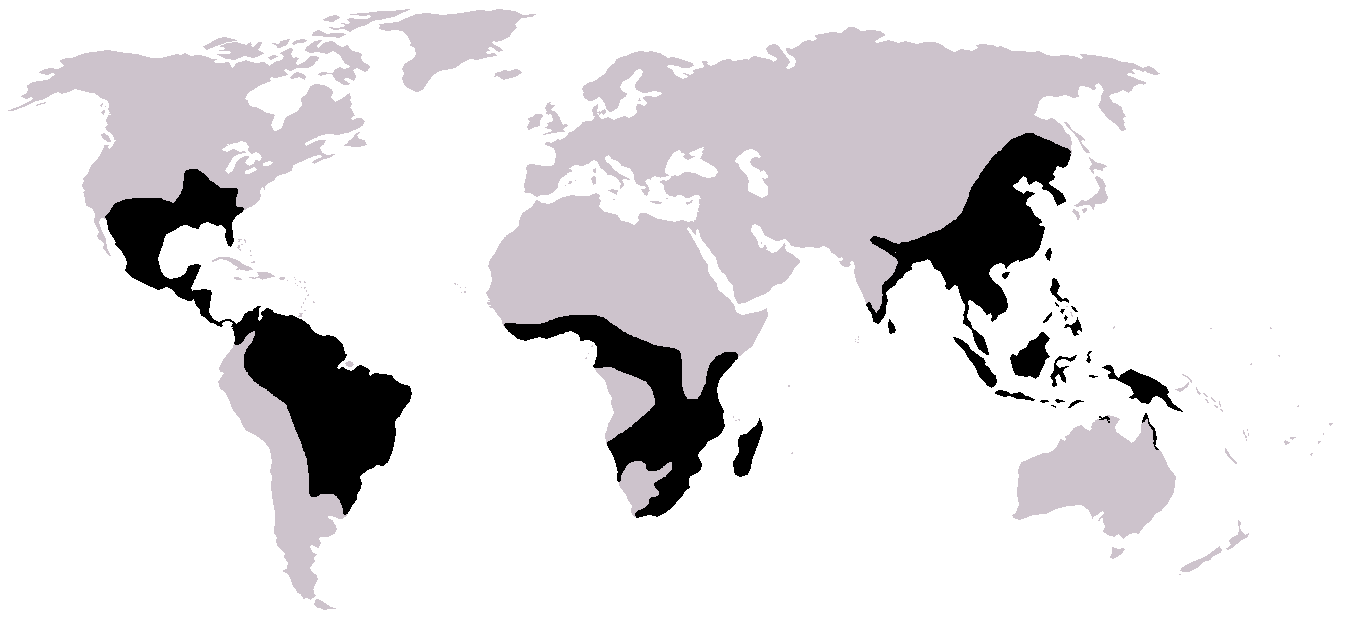
- Distribution of Microhylidae (in black)

= Microhylidae =

Microhylidae Temporal range: Paleocene - Present, 66–0 Ma

Family of amphibians

The Microhylidae, commonly known as narrow-mouthed frogs, are a geographically widespread family of frogs. The 683 species are in 57 genera and 11 subfamilies.

== Evolution ==
A molecular phylogenetic study by van der Meijden, et al. (2007) has estimated the initial internal divergence of the family Microhylidae to have taken place about 66 million years ago, or immediately after the Cretaceous extinction event. The most recent common ancestor of the Microhylidae and their closest ranoid relatives is estimated to have lived 116 million years ago in Gondwana.

== Description ==
As suggested by their name, microhylids are mostly small frogs. Many species are below 1.5 cm (0.59 in) in length, although some species are as large as 9 cm (3.5 in). They can be arboreal or terrestrial, and some even live close to water. The ground-dwellers are often found under leaf litter within forests, occasionally venturing out at night to hunt. The two main shapes for the microhylids are wide bodies and narrow mouths and normal frog proportions. Those with narrow mouths generally eat termites and ants, and the others have diets typical of most frogs. Egg-laying habits are highly varied.

=== Reproduction ===
The microhylids of New Guinea and Australia completely bypass the tadpole stage, with direct development from egg to frog. The arboreal species can therefore lay the eggs within the trees, and never need venture to the ground. Where species do have tadpoles, these almost always lack the teeth or horny beaks typical of the tadpoles of other families.

=== Anatomy ===
The skull has paired palatines and frontoparietals. The facial nerve passes through the anterior acoustic foramen in the auditory capsule; the trigeminal and facial nerve ganglia are fused to form a prootic ganglion. The eight (or seven) presacral holochordal vertebrae are all procoelous except for a biconcave surface on last presacral. The pectoral girdle is firmisternal and some show reduced clavicle and procoracoids. The terminal phalanges are blunt, pointed, or T-shaped. The tadpole lacks keratinized mouth parts and has a large spiracular chamber emptied by a caudomedial spiracle.

== Biochemistry ==
Phrynomantins are a family of peptides (specialised proteins) secreted through the skin of frogs of the genus Phrynomantis; Interestingly, it was previously thought that this family of frogs had, in the course of evolution, completely lost the ability to secrete defensive peptides through their skin, relying instead on other means of survival. There are 17 known precursor proteins encoded by the frog’s genes, which give rise to a total of 19 functional peptides.

== Taxonomy ==
- subfamily Adelastinae Peloso, Frost, Richards, Rodrigues, Donnellan, Matsui, Raxworthy, Biju, Lemmon, Lemmon, & Wheeler, 2015
  - genus Adelastes Zweifel, 1986
- subfamily Asterophryinae Günther, 1858
  - genus Aphantophryne Fry, 1917
  - genus Asterophrys Tschudi, 1838
  - genus Austrochaperina Fry, 1912
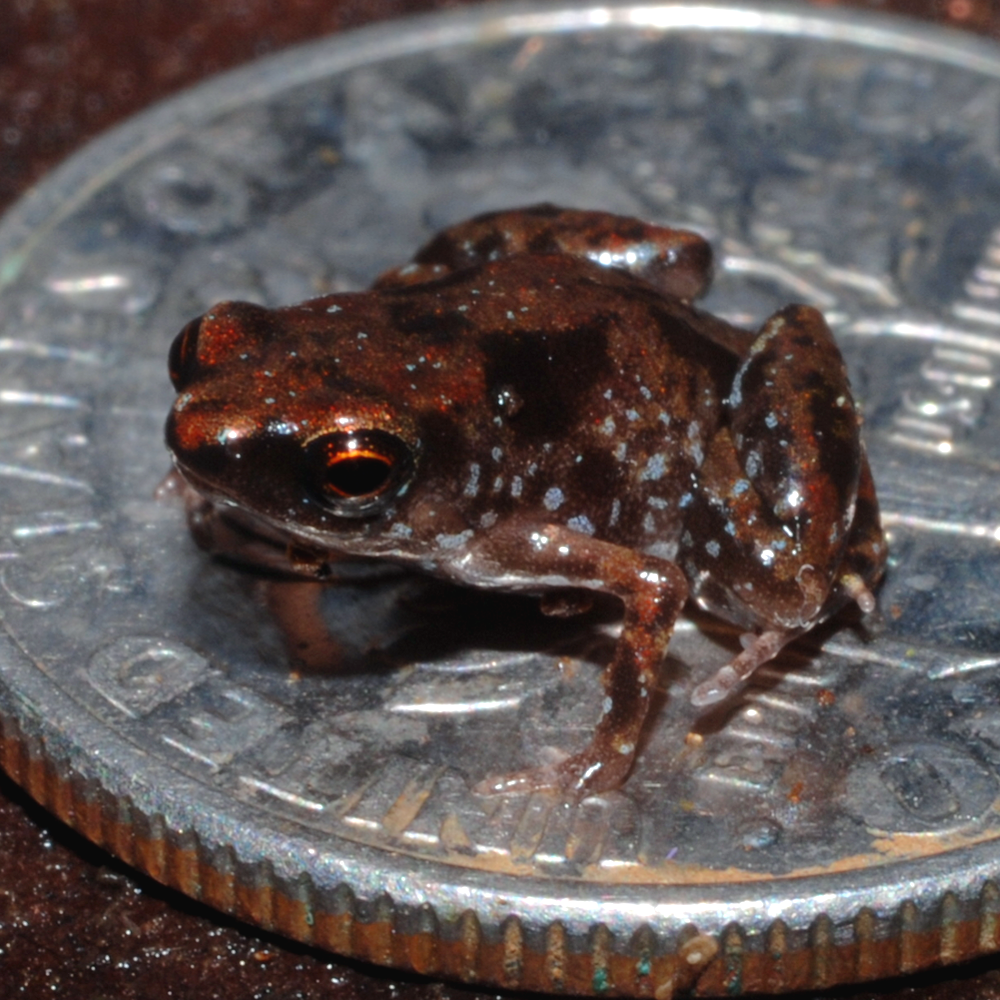
    Paedophryne amanuensis
  - genus Barygenys Parker, 1936
  - genus Callulops Boulenger, 1888
  - genus Choerophryne Van Kampen, 1914
  - genus Cophixalus Boettger, 1892
  - genus Copiula Méhely, 1901
  - genus Gastrophrynoides Noble, 1926
  - genus Hylophorbus Macleay, 1878
  - genus Mantophryne Boulenger, 1897
  - genus Oninia Günther, Stelbrink & von Rintelen, 2010
  - genus Oreophryne Boettger, 1895
  - genus Paedophryne Kraus, 2010
  - genus Siamophryne Suwannapoom, Sumontha, Tunprasert, Ruangsuwan, Pawangkhanant, Korost, and Poyarkov, 2018
  - genus Sphenophryne Peters & Doria, 1878
  - genus Vietnamophryne Poyarkov, Suwannapoom, Pawangkhanant, Aksornneam, Duong, Korost and Che, 2018
  - genus Xenorhina Peters, 1863
- subfamily Chaperininae Peloso, Frost, Richards, Rodrigues, Donnellan, Matsui, Raxworthy, Biju, Lemmon, Lemmon, & Wheeler, 2015
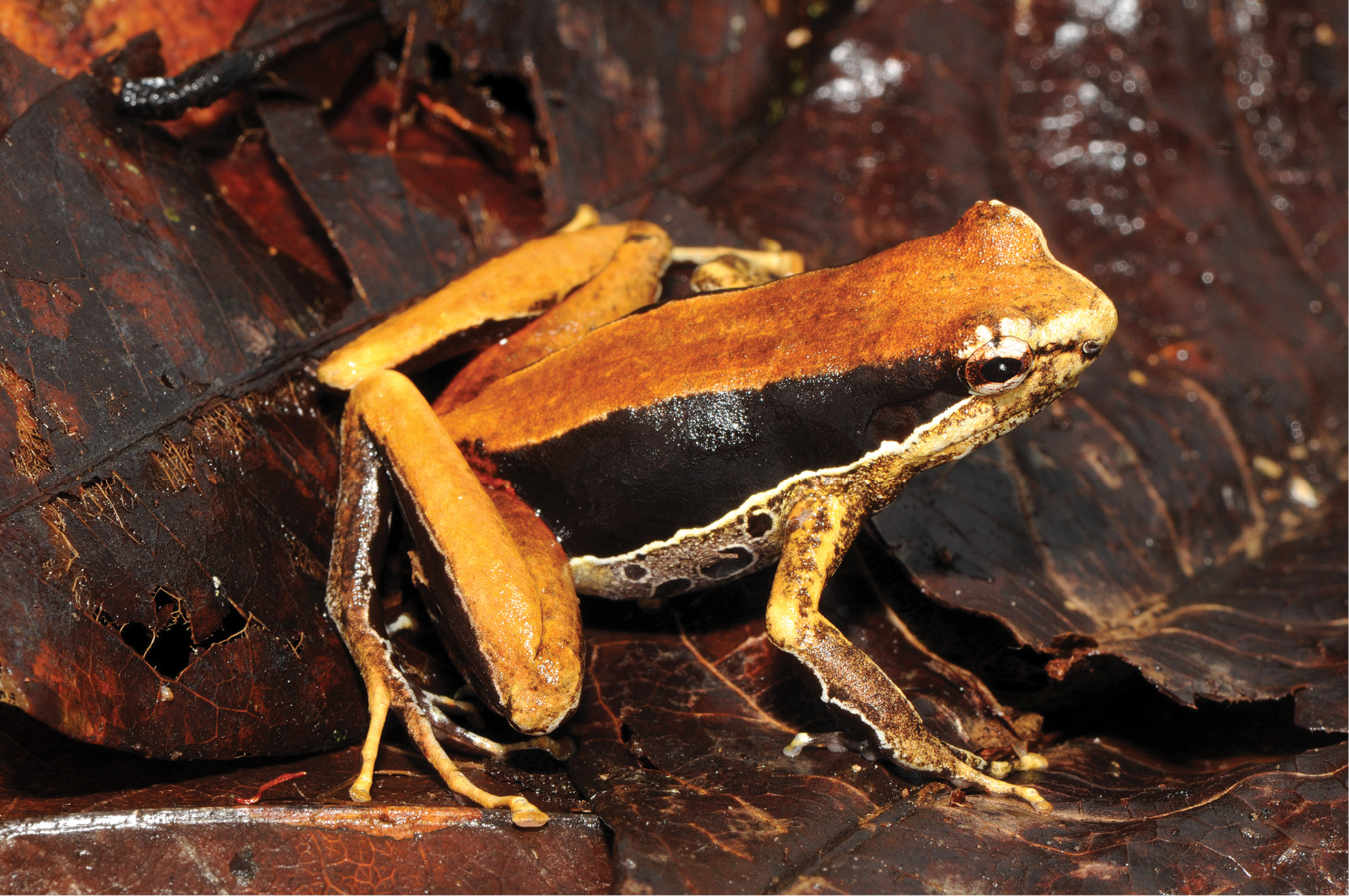
  - Mantophryne insignis
    genus Chaperina Mocquard, 1892
- subfamily Cophylinae Cope, 1889
  - genus Anilany Scherz, Vences, Rakotoarison, Andreone, Köhler, Glaw, and Crottini, 2016
  - genus Anodonthyla Müller, 1892
  - genus Cophyla Boettger, 1880
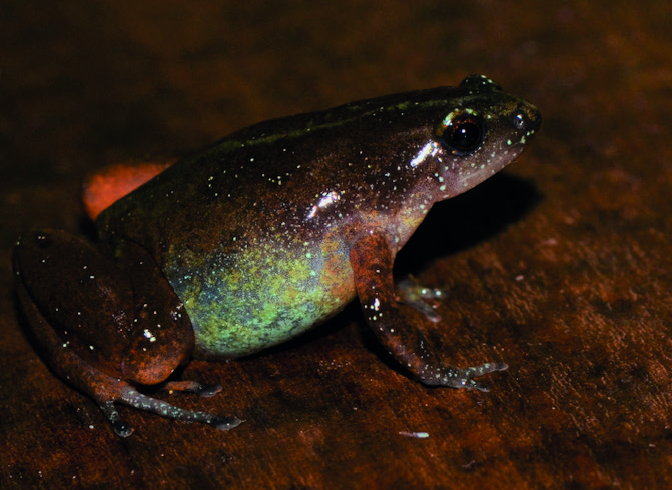
  - Chiasmocleis hudsoni
    genus Madecassophryne Guibé, 1974
  - genus Mini Scherz, Hutter, Rakotoarison, Riemann, Rödel, Ndriantsoa, Glos, Roberts, Crottini, Vences & Glaw, 2019
  - genus Plethodontohyla Boulenger, 1882
  - genus Rhombophryne Boettger, 1880
  - genus Stumpffia Botteger, 1881
- subfamily Dyscophinae Boulenger, 1882
  - genus Dyscophus Grandidier, 1872
- subfamily Gastrophryninae Fitzinger, 1843
  - genus Arcovomer Carvalho, 1954
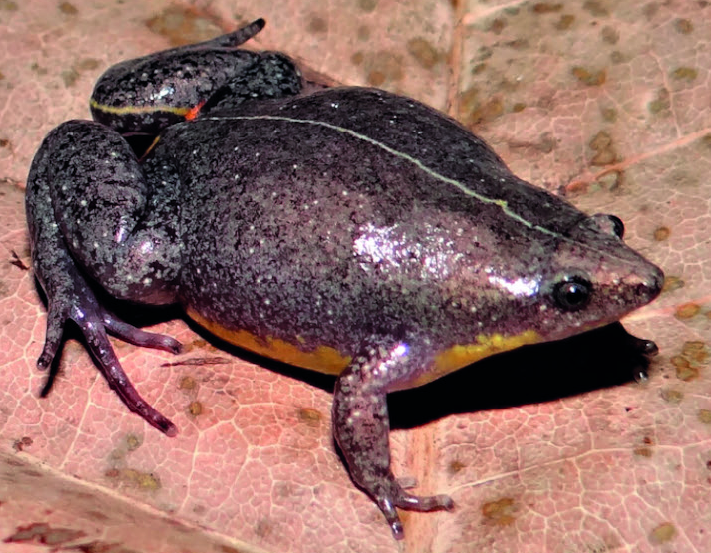
  - Elachistocleis helianneae
    genus Chiasmocleis Méhely, 1904
  - genus Ctenophryne Mocquard, 1904
  - genus Dasypops Miranda-Ribeiro, 1924
  - genus Dermatonotus Méhely, 1904
  - genus Elachistocleis Parker, 1927
  - genus Gastrophryne Fitzinger, 1843
  - genus Hamptophryne Carvalho, 1954
  - genus Hypopachus Keferstein, 1867
  - genus Myersiella Carvalho, 1954
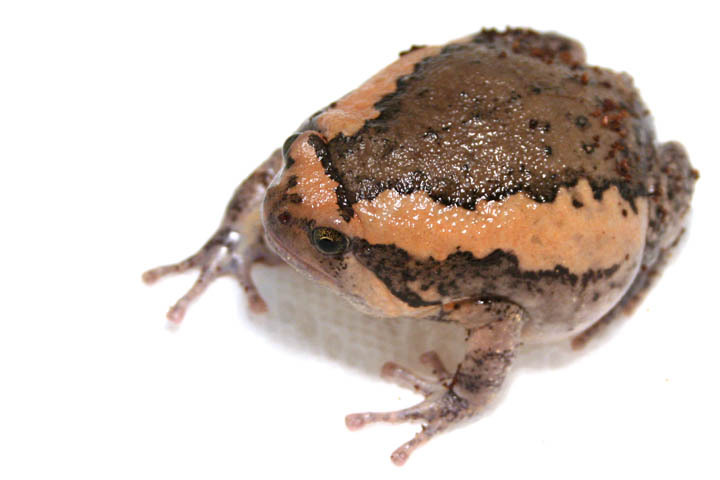
  - Kaloula pulchra
    genus Stereocyclops Cope, 1870
- subfamily Hoplophryninae Noble, 1931
  - genus Hoplophryne Barbour & Loveridge, 1928
  - genus Parhoplophryne Barbour & Loveridge, 1928
- subfamily Kalophryninae Mivart, 1869
  - genus Kalophrynus Tschudi, 1838
- subfamily Melanobatrachinae Noble, 1931
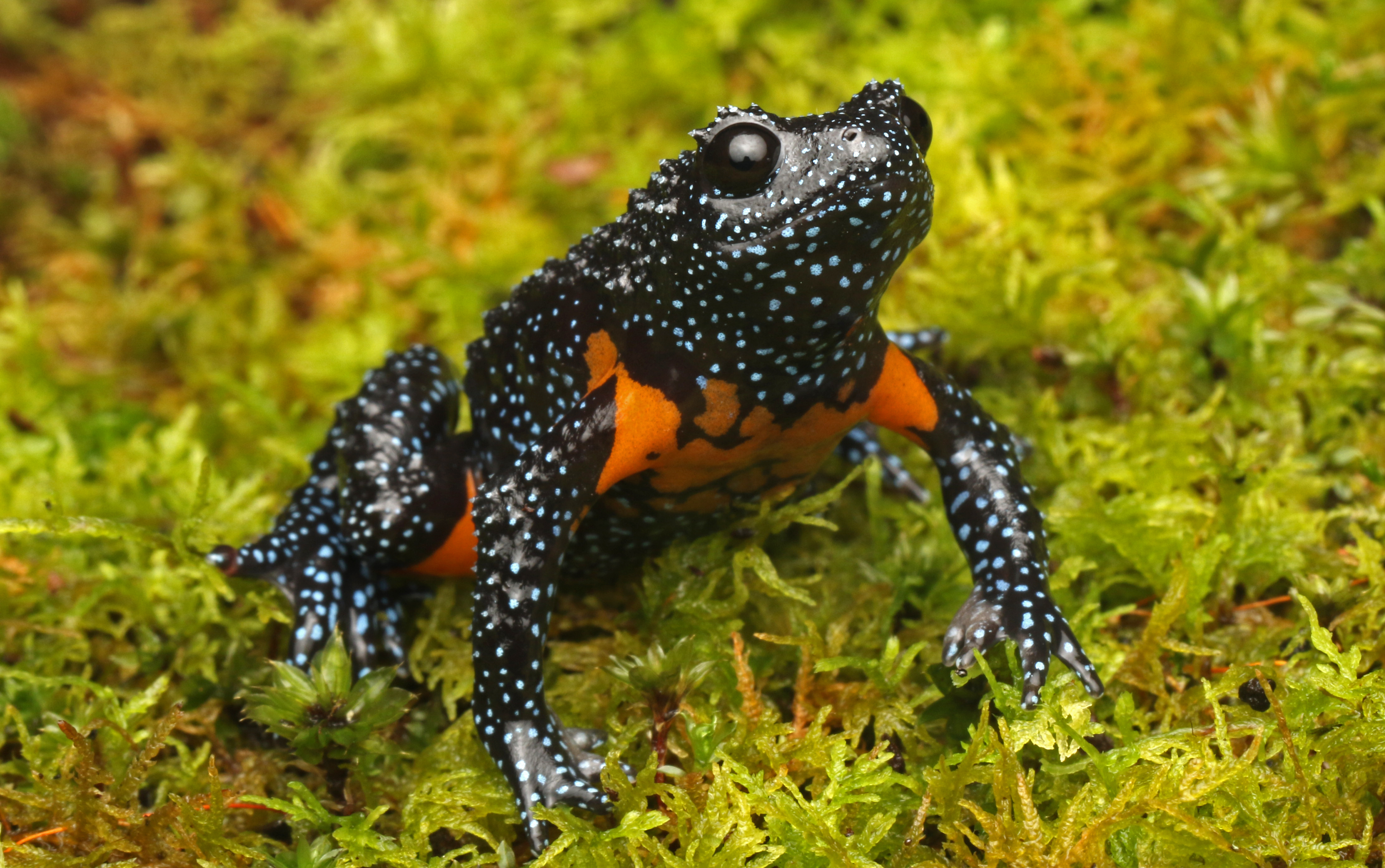
  - Melanobatrachus indicus
    genus Melanobatrachus Beddome, 1878
- subfamily Microhylinae Günther, 1858
  - genus Glyphoglossus Gunther, 1869 "1868"
  - genus Kaloula Gray, 1831
  - genus Metaphrynella Parker, 1934
  - genus Microhyla Tschudi, 1838
  - genus Micryletta Dubois, 1987
  - genus Mysticellus Sonali & Biju, 2019
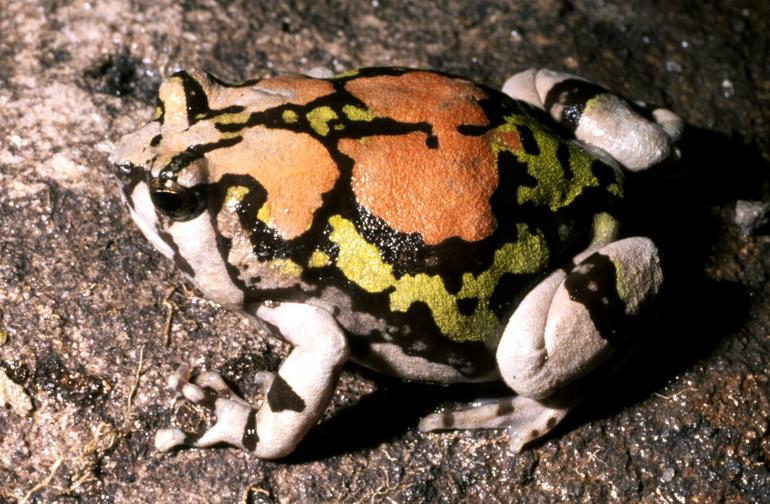
  - Scaphiophryne gottlebei
    genus Nanohyla Gorin, Scherz, Korost & Poyarkov, 2021
  - genus Phrynella Boulenger, 1887
  - genus Uperodon Duméril & Bibron, 1841
- subfamily Otophryninae Wassersug & Pyburn, 1987
  - genus Otophryne Boulenger, 1900
  - genus Synapturanus Carvalho, 1954
- subfamily Phrynomerinae Noble, 1931
  - genus Phrynomantis Peters, 1867
- subfamily Scaphiophryninae Laurent, 1946
  - genus Paradoxophyla Blommers-Schlösser & Blanc, 1991
  - genus Scaphiophryne Boulenger, 1882

== Range ==
Frogs from the Microhylidae occur throughout the tropical and warm temperate regions of North America, South America, Africa, eastern India, Sri Lanka, Southeast Asia, New Guinea, and Australia. Although most are found in tropical or subtropical regions, a few species can be found in arid or nontropical areas. They are the majority of frog species in New Guinea and Madagascar.

The ranges of each subfamily are:

- Hoplophryninae: Africa
- Scaphiophryninae: Madagascar
- Dyscophinae: Madagascar
- Microhylinae: Southeast Asia, East Asia, South Asia
- Asterophryinae: Australia, New Guinea
- Phrynomerinae: Africa
- Kalophryninae: Southeast Asia
- Otophyninae: South America
- Cophylinae: Madagascar
- Gastrophryninae: New World
- Melanobatrachinae: South Asia
- Chaperininae: Southeast Asia
- Adelastinae: South America
