= A. robusta =

A. robusta may refer to:

- Actinella robusta, an air-breathing land snail species endemic to Portugal
- Afromaimetsha robusta, an extinct species of wasp
- Aganippe robusta, a spider species in the genus Aganippe found in South Australia
- Agathis robusta, the Queensland kauri or smooth-barked kauri, a coniferous tree species native to eastern Queensland, Australia
- Alasmidonta robusta, the Carolina elktoe, an extinct freshwater mussel species endemic to the United States
- Ammannia robusta, the grand redstem, a flowering plant species native to most of western and central North America
- Anacampta robusta, a picture-winged fly species
- Aniba robusta, a plant species endemic to Venezuela
- Antistia robusta, a praying mantis species
- Arachnothera robusta, the Long-billed Spiderhunter, a bird species found in Brunei, Indonesia, Malaysia and Thailand
- Austrochaperina robusta, the robust frog, a frog species endemic to Australia

== See also ==
- Robusta
