= Ceroxys hortulana =

Scientific classification
- Kingdom: Animalia
- Phylum: Arthropoda
- Class: Insecta
- Order: Diptera
- Family: Ulidiidae
- Genus: Ceroxys
- Species: C. hortulana

Binomial name
- Ceroxys hortulana (Rossi, 1790)

Synonyms
- Musca hortulana Rossi, 1790; Meckelia elegans Robineau-Desvoidy, 1830; Musca hyalinata Panzer, 1798; Scatophaga marmorea Fabricius, 1805

Species of fly

Ceroxys hortulana is a species of picture-winged fly in the genus Ceroxys of the family Ulidiidae found in the Czech Republic, Austria, Bosnia Herzegovina, Croatia, France, Germany, Italy, Lithuania, Moldova, Poland, Portugal, Romania, Hungary, Slovakia, Ukraine, and Russia.
