= Copiula rivularis =

Conservation status
- Least Concern (IUCN 3.1)

Scientific classification
- Kingdom: Animalia
- Phylum: Chordata
- Class: Amphibia
- Order: Anura
- Family: Microhylidae
- Genus: Copiula
- Species: C. rivularis

Binomial name
- Copiula rivularis (Zweifel, 2000)

Synonyms
- Austrochaperina rivularis Zweifel, 2000

Species of frog

Copiula rivularis is a species of frog in the family Microhylidae. It is endemic to Papua New Guinea and known from near the Indonesian border east to the Morobe Province; it is expected to occur in the Papua province of Indonesia. The specific name comes from the Latin adjective pertaining to small brooks or streams and refers to the habitat of this species. Based on molecular evidence, it was transferred from Austrochaperina to Copiula in 2016.

== Description ==
Males grow to 45 mm (1.8 in) and females to 52 mm (2.0 in) in snout–vent length; the body size is geographically variable. The dorsum is olive-brown with darker brown markings. Ventral coloration is gray-brown with faint darker mottling that is most evident on the chin. The legs are moderately long. The tympanum is scarcely visible. The fingers and toes are unwebbed and have well-developed terminal discs.

== Habitat and conservation ==
Its natural habitats are tropical forests where it occurs along small streams; they might hide under the leaf litter but are good swimmers. It is locally abundant and there are no known threats facing it.
