= Slender frog (disambiguation) =

The slender frog is an Australian and New Guinean frog of the family Microhylidae.

"Slender frog" may also refer to one of several other frogs:

- Kajang slender litter frog, a frog in the family Megophryidae endemic to Malaysia
- Marbled slender frog, a frog in the family Ranidae found in Cambodia, China, Hong Kong, Laos, Malaysia, Myanmar, Thailand, and Vietnam
- Slender tree frog, a frog in the family Hylidae native to southwestern Australia
