= Copiula derongo =

Conservation status
- Least Concern (IUCN 3.1)

Scientific classification
- Kingdom: Animalia
- Phylum: Chordata
- Class: Amphibia
- Order: Anura
- Family: Microhylidae
- Genus: Copiula
- Species: C. derongo

Binomial name
- Copiula derongo (Zweifel, 2000)

Synonyms
- Austrochaperina derongo Zweifel, 2000

Species of frog

Copiula derongo is a species of frog in the family Microhylidae. It is endemic to New Guinea and found in both Indonesia and Papua New Guinea. The specific name derongo refers to its type locality, the village of Derongo in the Western Province (Papua New Guinea). Based on molecular evidence, it was transferred from Austrochaperina to Copiula in 2016.

== Description ==
Males measure up to 37 mm (1.5 in) and females up to 50 mm (2.0 in) in snout–vent length, although the maximum size varies geographically. The dorsal ground colour is olive to reddish brown, sometimes with dark speckles. In most males (and in some females) the tip of the snout is much paler than the rest of the head. The eyes are small and the tympanum is obscure.

== Habitat and conservation ==
Its natural habitats are tropical forests. It breeds in mud cavities. It is locally common and occurs in remote areas with little human influence, and is therefore not considered threatened.
