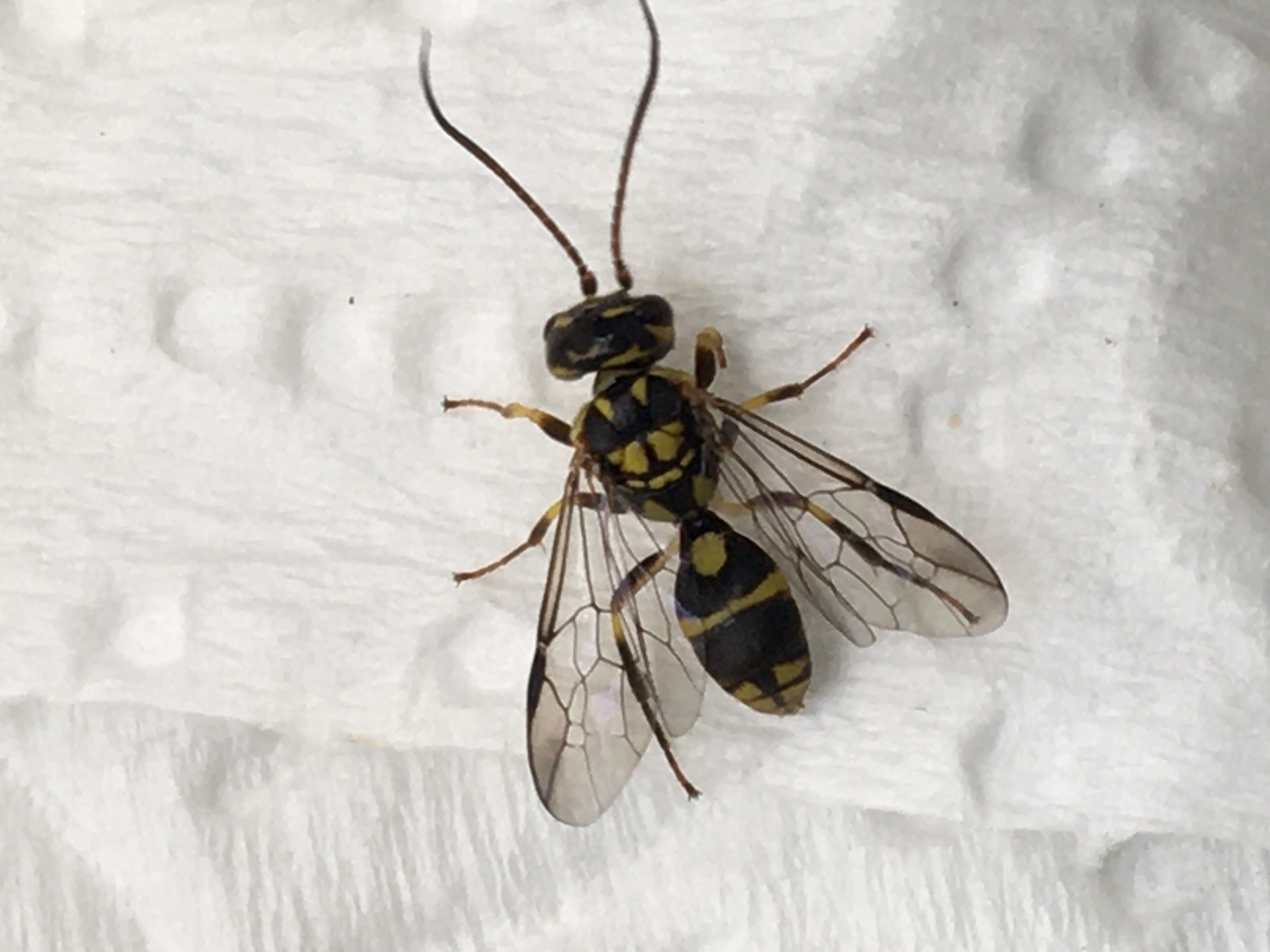
- Adult found in Selangor, Malaysia

Scientific classification
- Kingdom: Animalia
- Phylum: Arthropoda
- Class: Insecta
- Order: Hymenoptera
- Family: Trigonalidae
- Genus: Taeniogonalos
- Species: T. gestroi

Binomial name
- Taeniogonalos gestroi (Schultz, 1908)

Synonyms
- Poecilogonalos thwaitesi var. gestroi Schultz, 1908; Poecilogonalos pulchella gestroi Weinstein and Austin, 1991; Poecilogonalos thwaitesi thwaitesi Weinstein and Austin, 1991

= Taeniogonalos gestroi =

Species of wasp

Taeniogonalos gestroi is a species of wasp in the family Trigonalidae. It is a hyperparasitoid that parasitise Ichneumonidae and Tachinidae larva inside the caterpillars of Lepidoptera.

== Distribution ==
It has a wide range, as it is native to India (Sikkim), Malaysia, China (Hainan, Jiangsu, Yunnan), Myanmar, Thailand, Laos, Indonesia, Taiwan and Papua New Guinea.

== Description ==
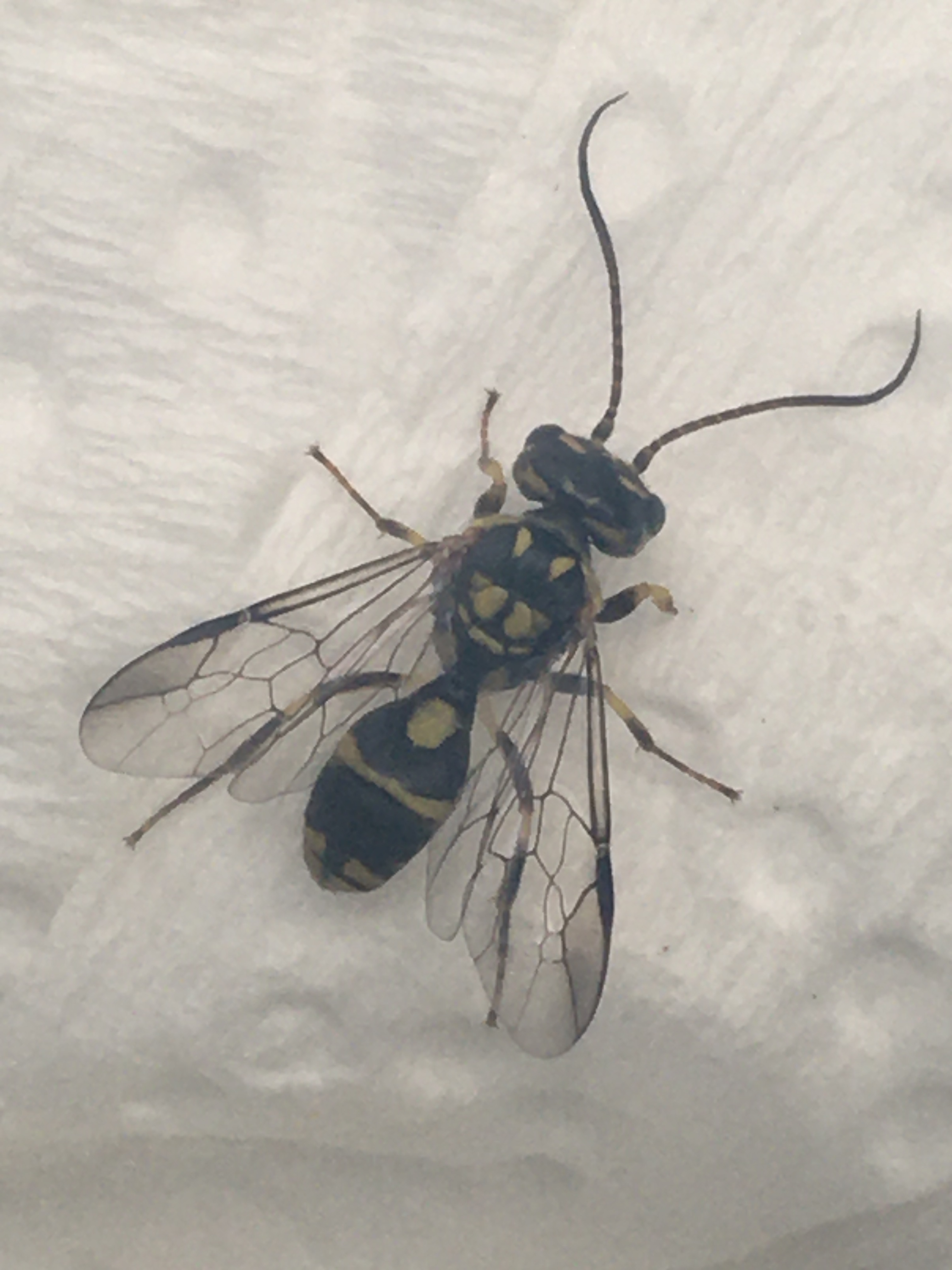
Taeniogonalos gestroi adult

Ground colour is black with yellow maculae (spots; patterns). Wings are hyaline (translucent), with the forewings having a brown translucent area covering most of the radial cell. Adults are diurnal. It was previously thought to be a subspecies or a variety of a different species, Taeniogonalos thwaitesii, which is native to Sri Lanka.

Females lack a medio-apical process on the second sternite.
