= Rain frog =

Rain frog may refer to one of the following:

- Eleutherodactylidae, a family of frogs in the Americas
  - Eleutherodactylus in Neotropics
- Brevicipitidae
  - Breviceps in Africa
- Austrochaperina pluvialis in Australia
- Craugastor in Neotropics
- Leptodactylus in Neotropics
- Pristimantis in Neotropics (related to Eleutherodactylus)
- Scaphiophryne in Madagascar
