= Copiula guttata =

Conservation status
- Least Concern (IUCN 3.1)

Scientific classification
- Kingdom: Animalia
- Phylum: Chordata
- Class: Amphibia
- Order: Anura
- Family: Microhylidae
- Genus: Copiula
- Species: C. guttata

Binomial name
- Copiula guttata (Zweifel, 2000)

Synonyms
- Austrochaperina guttata Zweifel, 2000

Species of frog

Copiula guttata is a species of frog in the family Microhylidae. It is endemic to Papua New Guinea and known from around the head of the Gulf of Papua in the Gulf and Chimbu Provinces. The specific name is the Latin adjective guttata that means "spotted" and refers to the dorsal colour pattern of this species. Based on molecular evidence, it was transferred from Austrochaperina to Copiula in 2016.

== Description ==
Males measure 37–43 mm (1.5–1.7 in) and females 41–44 mm (1.6–1.7 in) in snout–vent length. The dorsum bears a pattern of irregular dark brown spots on a gray-brown background. The legs are long. The tympanum is small and inconspicuous. The fingers and toes are unwebbed and have well-developed terminal discs.

== Habitat and conservation ==
Its natural habitats are lowland tropical forests. It is a leaf-litter species that breeds in soil cavities. It is a reasonably common species and although it can suffer locally from habitat loss, it also occurs in remote areas with little human influence, and is therefore not considered threatened.
