= Ceroxys caerulea =

Scientific classification
- Kingdom: Animalia
- Phylum: Arthropoda
- Class: Insecta
- Order: Diptera
- Family: Ulidiidae
- Genus: Ceroxys
- Species: C. caerulea

Binomial name
- Ceroxys caerulea

Species of fly

Ceroxys caerulea is a species of ulidiid or picture-winged fly in the genus Ceroxys of the family Ulidiidae.
