= Taeniogonalos raymenti =

Scientific classification
- Kingdom: Animalia
- Phylum: Arthropoda
- Class: Insecta
- Order: Hymenoptera
- Family: Trigonalidae
- Genus: Taeniogonalos
- Species: T. raymenti

Binomial name
- Taeniogonalos raymenti Carmean & Kimsey, 1998

Species of wasp

Taeniogonalos raymenti is a species of wasp in the family Trigonalidae. It can be reared as a hyperparasite of the fly Sturmia convergens, itself a parasite of the monarch butterfly (Danaus plexippus).
