= Austrochaperina novaebritanniae =

Conservation status
- Vulnerable (IUCN 3.1)

Scientific classification
- Kingdom: Animalia
- Phylum: Chordata
- Class: Amphibia
- Order: Anura
- Family: Microhylidae
- Genus: Austrochaperina
- Species: A. novaebritanniae

Binomial name
- Austrochaperina novaebritanniae Zweifel, 2000

Species of frog

Austrochaperina novaebritanniae is a species of frog in the family Microhylidae. It is endemic to the island of New Britain, Papua New Guinea. It is restricted to the northeastern part of the island where it occurs in lowland rainforests at elevations of 350–1,000 m (1,150–3,280 ft) above sea level. It has also been found in a recently cleared rainforest. It is threatened by the logging of lowland forest but can be locally abundant.
