= Ceroxys flavoscutellata =

Scientific classification
- Kingdom: Animalia
- Phylum: Arthropoda
- Class: Insecta
- Order: Diptera
- Family: Ulidiidae
- Genus: Ceroxys
- Species: C. flavoscutellata

Binomial name
- Ceroxys flavoscutellata Pape, 1986

Species of fly

Ceroxys flavoscutellata is a species of ulidiid or picture-winged fly in the genus Ceroxys of the family Ulidiidae.
