= Copiula =

Scientific classification
- Domain: Eukaryota
- Kingdom: Animalia
- Phylum: Chordata
- Class: Amphibia
- Order: Anura
- Family: Microhylidae
- Subfamily: Asterophryinae
- Genus: Copiula; Méhelÿ, 1901

Type species
- Phrynixalus oxyrhinus Boulenger, 1898

Species
- 14 species (see text)

Genus of amphibians

Copiula is a genus of microhylid frogs endemic to New Guinea. The common name Mehely frogs has been coined for them. They are leaf-litter inhabitants.

== Taxonomy ==
Copiula is probably not monophyletic. Some former Austrochaperina species have already been transferred to this genus, and further ones might follow when more data became available.

== Species ==
There are at present 14 species in this genus:

- Copiula alpestris (Zweifel, 2000)
- Copiula annanoreenae Günther, Richards, and Dahl, 2014
- Copiula derongo (Zweifel, 2000)
- Copiula exspectata Günther, 2002
- Copiula fistulans Menzies and Tyler, 1977 — Lae Mehely Frog
- Copiula guttata (Zweifel, 2000)
- Copiula lennarti Günther, Richards, and Dahl, 2014
- Copiula major Günther, 2002
- Copiula minor Menzies and Tyler, 1977 — Milne Bay Mehely Frog
- Copiula obsti Günther, 2002
- Copiula oxyrhina (Boulenger, 1898) — Misima Island Mehely Frog
- Copiula pipiens Burton and Stocks, 1986 — Wirui Mehely Frog
- Copiula rivularis (Zweifel, 2000)
- Copiula tyleri Burton, 1990 — Sepik Mehely Frog

The AmphibiaWeb reports fewer species, with species that Peloso and colleagues moved in 2016 from Austrochaperina and Oxydactyla missing.
