= Pseudogonalos =

Scientific classification
- Kingdom: Animalia
- Phylum: Arthropoda
- Clade: Pancrustacea
- Class: Insecta
- Order: Hymenoptera
- Family: Trigonalidae
- Genus: Pseudogonalos; Schulz, 1906

Genus of parasitic wasps

Pseudogonalos is a genus of parasitic wasps belonging to the family Trigonalidae. Members of these genus vary from 5.5mm to 13.9mm in length.

== Species ==
Species include:

- Pseudogonalos angusta Schulz, 1906
- Pseudogonalos hahnii (Spinola, 1840)
