= Ceroxys morosa =

Scientific classification
- Kingdom: Animalia
- Phylum: Arthropoda
- Clade: Pancrustacea
- Class: Insecta
- Order: Diptera
- Family: Ulidiidae
- Genus: Ceroxys
- Species: C. morosa

Binomial name
- Ceroxys morosa (Loew, 1873)

Synonyms
- Anacampta morosa Loew, 1873

Species of fly

Ceroxys morosa is a species of picture-winged fly in the genus Ceroxys of the family Ulidiidae found in Russia.
