= Sturmia convergens =

Scientific classification
- Kingdom: Animalia
- Phylum: Arthropoda
- Clade: Pancrustacea
- Class: Insecta
- Order: Diptera
- Family: Tachinidae
- Subfamily: Exoristinae
- Tribe: Goniini
- Genus: Sturmia
- Species: S. convergens

Binomial name
- Sturmia convergens (Wiedemann, 1824)

Synonyms
- Polychnomyia flavohalterata Bischof, 1904; Sturmia completa Curran, 1927; Tachina convergens Wiedemann, 1824; Tachina setilatera Wiedemann, 1824

Species of fly

Sturmia convergens is a genus of flies in the family Tachinidae.

It is a parasitoid of the monarch butterfly (Danaus plexippus), as well as Danaus chrysippus and Agrius convolvuli. The wasp species Taeniogonalos raymenti can be reared as a hyperparasite of S. convergens.

== Distribution ==
Ethiopia, Kenya, Malawi, Nigeria, Sierra Leone, South Africa, Tanzania, Uganda, Zambia, Zimbabwe, India, Sri Lanka, Australia, Papua New Guinea.
