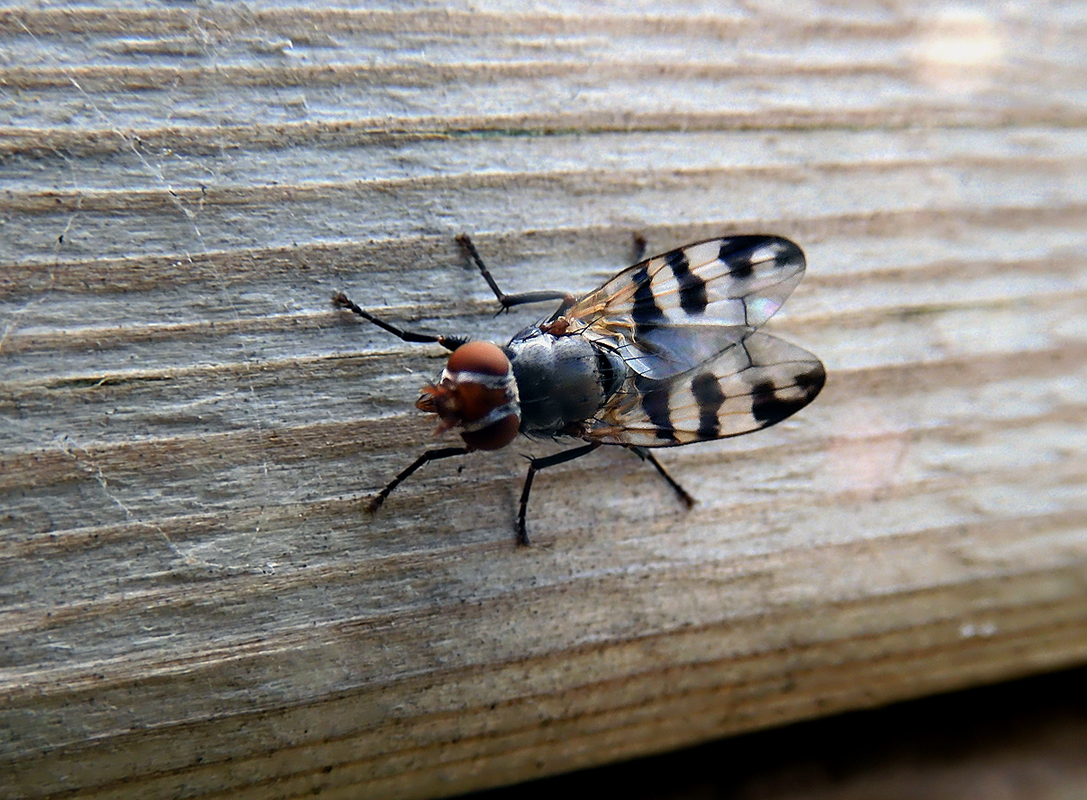

Scientific classification
- Kingdom: Animalia
- Phylum: Arthropoda
- Clade: Pancrustacea
- Class: Insecta
- Order: Diptera
- Family: Ulidiidae
- Genus: Ceroxys
- Species: C. urticae

Binomial name
- Ceroxys urticae (Linnaeus, 1758)

Synonyms
- Musca urticae Linnaeus, 1758; Ceroxys euzonus Steyskal, 1968

= Ceroxys urticae =

Band-winged Wingwaver

Species of fly

Ceroxys urticae, the band-winged wingwaver, is a species of picture-winged fly in the genus Ceroxys of the family Ulidiidae found in most of Europe. It can also be found in Egypt, Iran, Israel, Kazakhstan, Kyrgyzstan, Mongolia, Saudi Arabia, Turkmenistan, and Uzbekistan. Plants this fly lives on include alfalfa, the true grasses (Poaceae), Egyptian clover (Trifolium alexandrinum L.) and wild sugarcane.

== Gallery ==
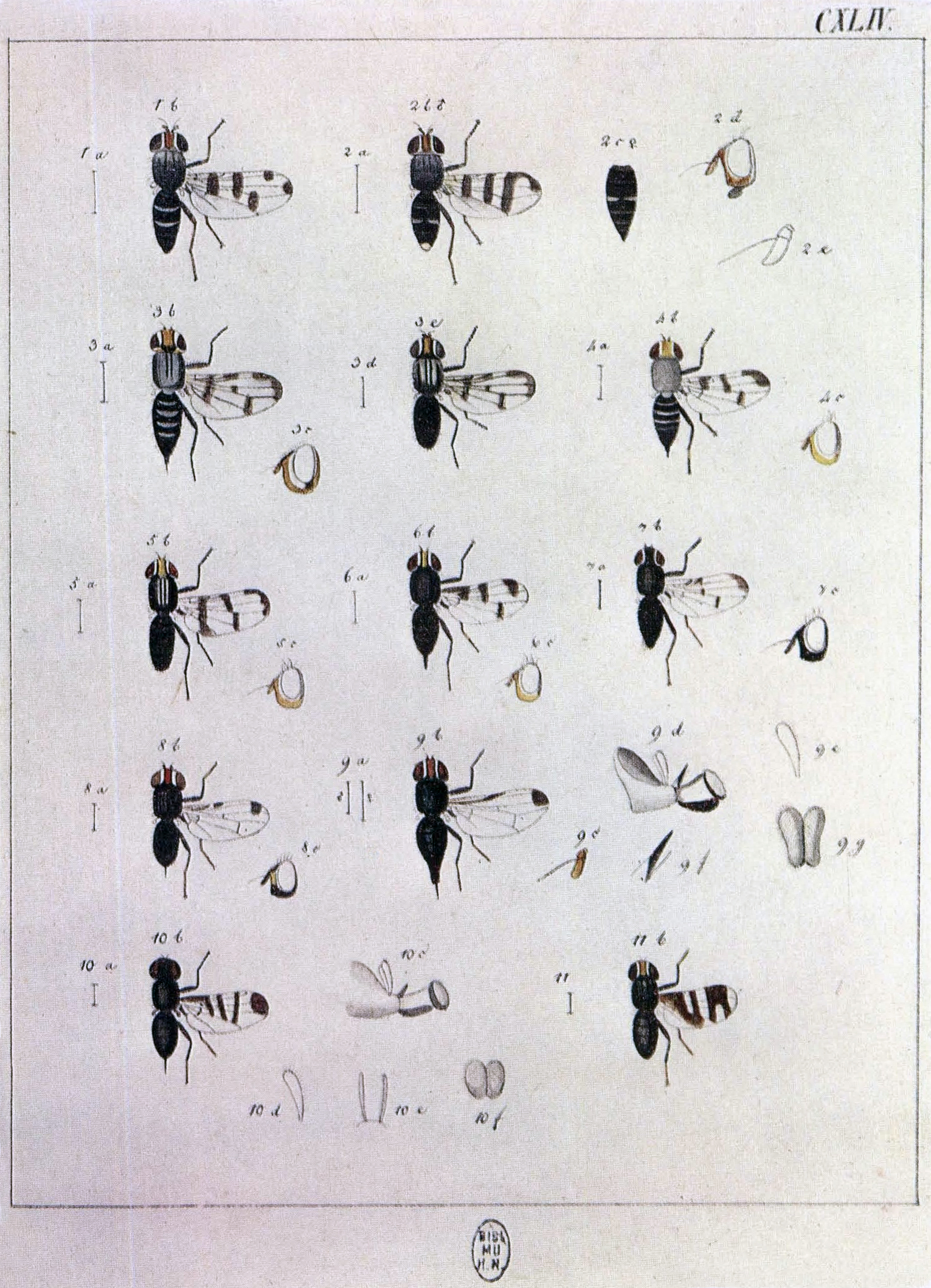
Ceroxys urticae
