= Copiula fistulans =

Conservation status
- Least Concern (IUCN 3.1)

Scientific classification
- Kingdom: Animalia
- Phylum: Chordata
- Class: Amphibia
- Order: Anura
- Family: Microhylidae
- Genus: Copiula
- Species: C. fistulans

Binomial name
- Copiula fistulans Menzies and Tyler, 1977

Species of frog

Copiula fistulans is a species of frog in the family Microhylidae. It is endemic to Papua New Guinea and occurs in the northeastern part of New Guinea in Morobe and Northern Provinces. Common name Lae Mehely frog has been coined for this species.

== Description ==
Adult males measure 28–35 mm (1.1–1.4 in) and adult females 31–36 mm (1.2–1.4 in) in snout–vent length. The snout is prominent, projecting far beyond the anterior limit of the mandible. Its tip is often slightly uptilted. The head is wider than it is long. The eyes are small inconspicuous. The tympanic membrane is distinct although the tympanic annulus is not; no supratympanic fold is present. The fingers and toes bear very small terminal discs; those of the toes are slightly larger than the finger ones. No webbing is present. Skin is smooth. Living animals are medium grayish-brown to fawn; some are irregularly mottled. The sides are darker. Many individuals have a narrow mid-dorsal stripe. There are black canthal and postorbital stripes. The undersurfaces are yellow with grey vermiculations on the throat and, in some individuals, extending to the abdomen. Preserved specimens are pale gray to dull brown above, apart from the tip of the snout, which is unpigmented. An elongate and slightly irregular black stripe extends from the postorbital to the scapular regions. The undersurfaces are pale cream, heavily suffused with brown under the jaws and on the limbs.

== Habitat and conservation ==
Copiula fistulans is found on forested hillsides at fairly low elevations, below 500 m (1,600 ft). It lives in burrows in the forest floor and appears to avoid low-lying, flat areas where the soil is subject to inundation. It has also been found in burrows on abandoned logging roads and can tolerate some habitat modification. It has direct development (i.e., there is no free-living larval stage).

Copiula fistulans is locally a very common species and is facing no known threats. It is not known to occur in any protected area.
