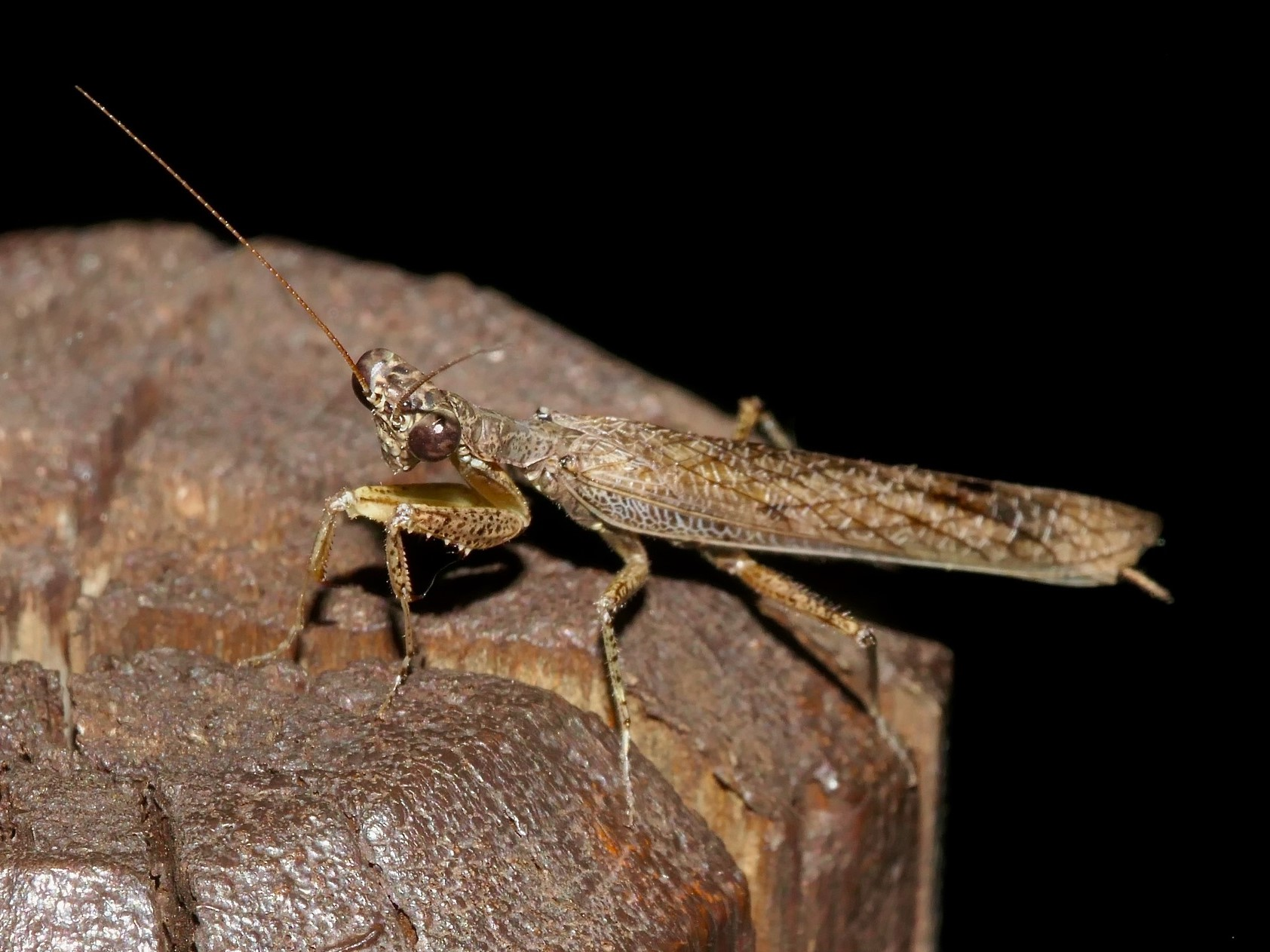

Scientific classification
- Domain: Eukaryota
- Kingdom: Animalia
- Phylum: Arthropoda
- Class: Insecta
- Order: Mantodea
- Family: Eremiaphilidae
- Genus: Antistia
- Species: A. maculipennis

Binomial name
- Antistia maculipennis Stål, 1876

Synonyms
- Antistia signata Karny, 1908

= Antistia maculipennis =

Species of praying mantis

Antistia maculipennis is a species of praying mantis in the family Eremiaphilidae. It has been found in southern and western Africa (Botswana, Namibia, and Burkina Faso).

== See also ==
- List of mantis genera and species
