= Austrochaperina mehelyi =

Conservation status
- Least Concern (IUCN 3.1)

Scientific classification
- Kingdom: Animalia
- Phylum: Chordata
- Class: Amphibia
- Order: Anura
- Family: Microhylidae
- Genus: Austrochaperina
- Species: A. mehelyi

Binomial name
- Austrochaperina mehelyi (Parker, 1934)

Synonyms
- Chaperina fusca Méhely, 1901; Sphenophryne fusca — Van Kampen, 1923; Sphenophryne mehelyi Parker, 1934

Species of frog

Austrochaperina mehelyi is a species of frog in the family Microhylidae, endemic to Papua New Guinea, known only from two localities, Adelbert Range and mountains of Huon Peninsula . Its natural habitats are subtropical or tropical moist lowland forests and subtropical or tropical moist montane forests. It is very poorly known and was last collected in 2003 where it was abundant.

A. mehelyi was originally described as a new species Chaperina fusca by Hungarian zoologist Lajos Méhelÿ in 1901; however, that name was preoccupied by another frog species described already in 1892. A replacement for the specific name was given in 1934 by Hampton Wildman Parker.
