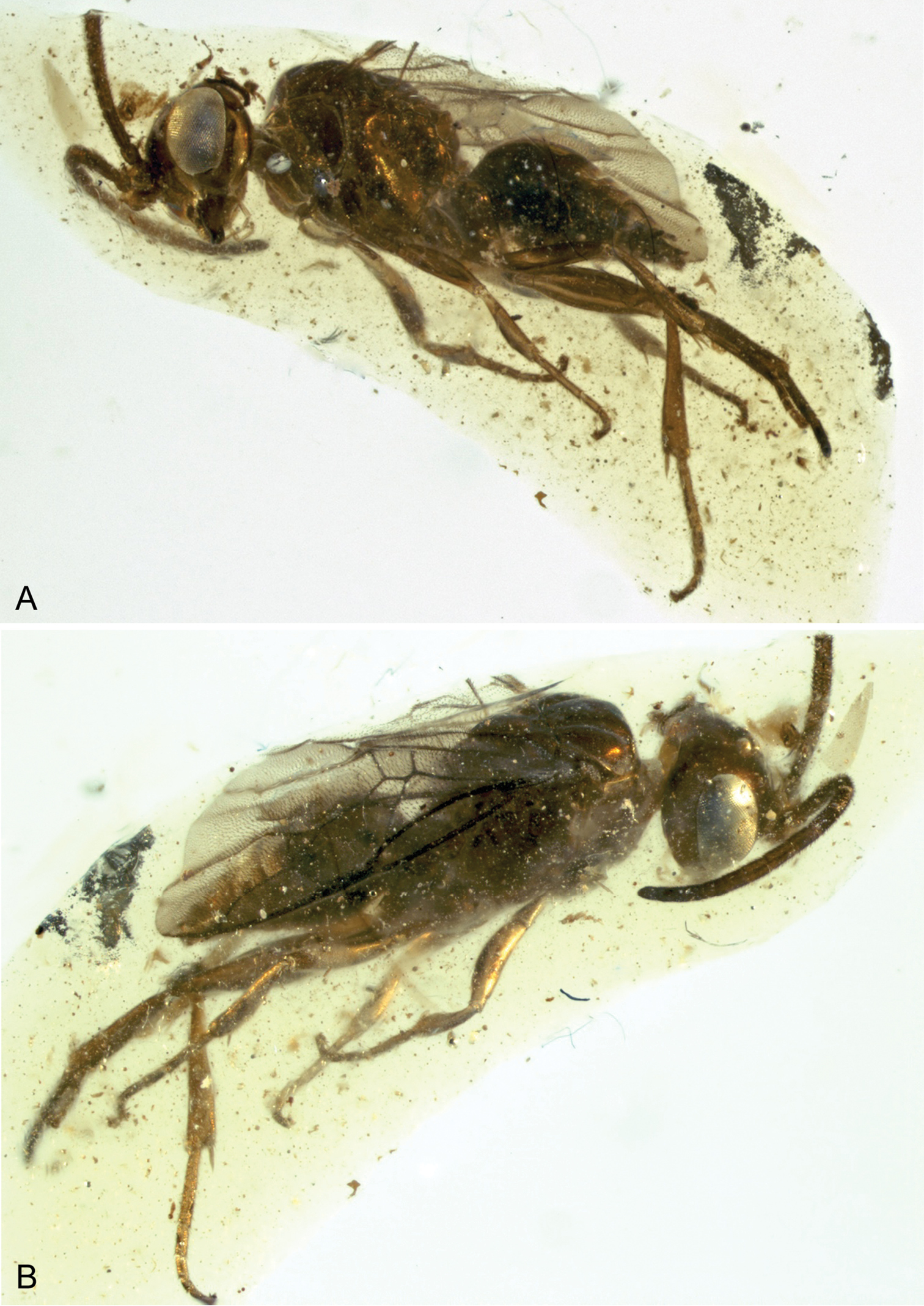
- Male of Guyotemaimetsha enigmatica

Scientific classification
- Kingdom: Animalia
- Phylum: Arthropoda
- Class: Insecta
- Order: Hymenoptera
- Family: †Maimetshidae
- Subfamily: †Maimetshinae
- Tribe: †Maimetshini
- Genus: †Guyotemaimetsha; Perrichot, Nel & Néraudeau, 2004
- Species: †G. enigmatica

Binomial name
- †Guyotemaimetsha enigmatica Perrichot, Nel & Néraudeau, 2004

= Guyotemaimetsha =

Guyotemaimetsha Temporal range: Albian

Extinct genus of wasps

Guyotemaimetsha is an extinct genus of wasp which existed in France during the Cretaceous period. The only species is Guyotemaimetsha enigmatica.
