= Ceroxys zaidami =

Scientific classification
- Kingdom: Animalia
- Phylum: Arthropoda
- Clade: Pancrustacea
- Class: Insecta
- Order: Diptera
- Family: Ulidiidae
- Genus: Ceroxys
- Species: C. zaidami

Binomial name
- Ceroxys zaidami (Becker, 1907)

Synonyms
- Meckelia zaidami Becker, 1907

Species of fly

Ceroxys zaidami is a species of ulidiid or picture-winged fly in the genus Ceroxys of the family Ulidiidae.
