= Ceroxys baneai =

Scientific classification
- Kingdom: Animalia
- Phylum: Arthropoda
- Class: Insecta
- Order: Diptera
- Family: Ulidiidae
- Subfamily: Otitinae
- Tribe: Otitini
- Genus: Ceroxys
- Species: C. baneai

Binomial name
- Ceroxys baneai Gheorghiu, 1994

Species of fly

Ceroxys baneai is a species of picture-winged fly in the genus Ceroxys of the family Ulidiidae found in

== Distribution ==
Romania.
