= Austrochaperina archboldi =

Conservation status
- Data Deficient (IUCN 3.1)

Scientific classification
- Kingdom: Animalia
- Phylum: Chordata
- Class: Amphibia
- Order: Anura
- Family: Microhylidae
- Genus: Austrochaperina
- Species: A. archboldi

Binomial name
- Austrochaperina archboldi Zweifel, 2000

Species of frog

Austrochaperina archboldi is a species of frog in the family Microhylidae.

It is endemic to Papua New Guinea, known only from specimens found in Kratke Range. Its natural habitat is subtropical or tropical moist montane forests.
