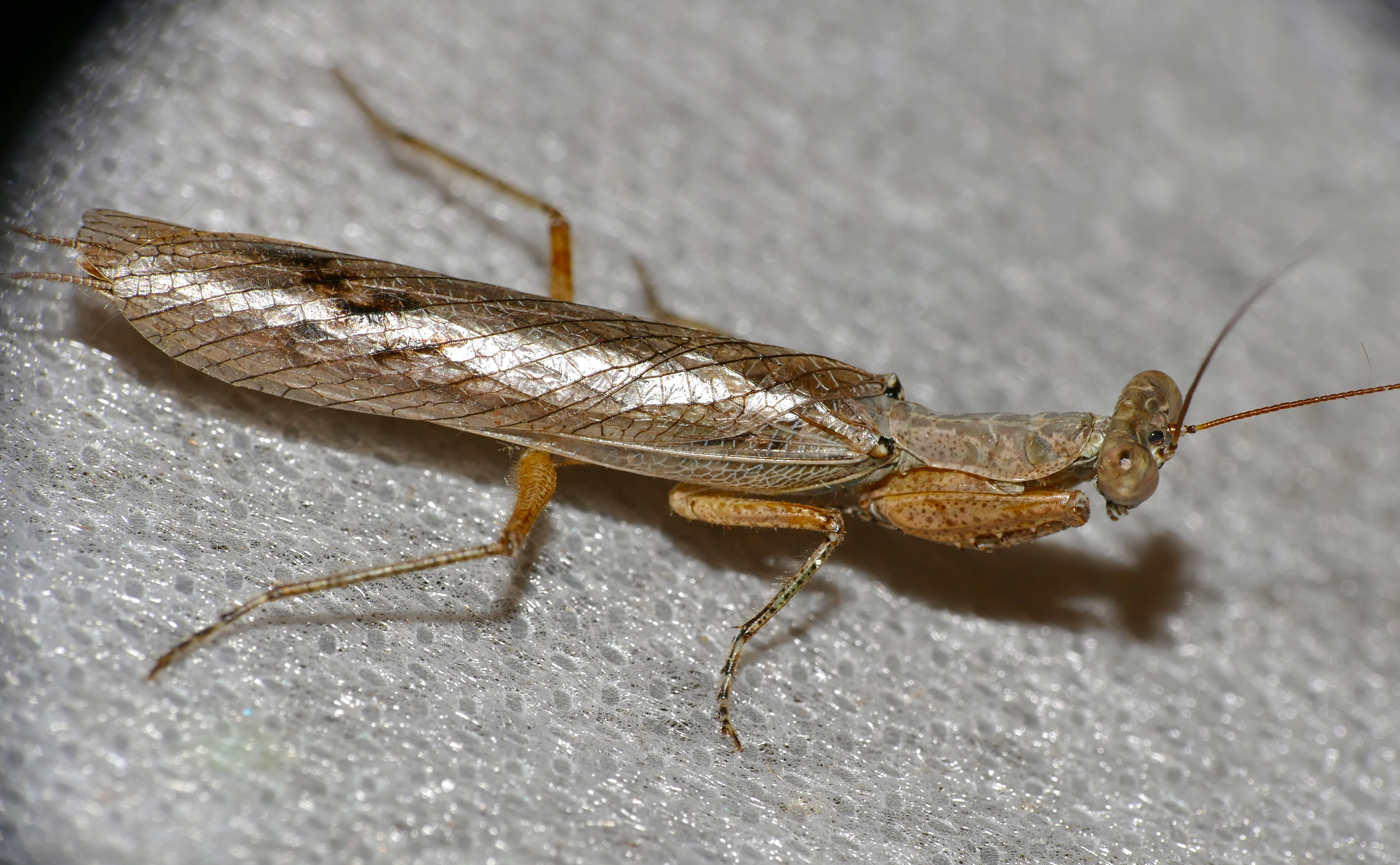
- In South Africa

Scientific classification
- Kingdom: Animalia
- Phylum: Arthropoda
- Clade: Pancrustacea
- Class: Insecta
- Order: Mantodea
- Family: Eremiaphilidae
- Subfamily: Tarachodinae
- Tribe: Tarachodini
- Genus: Antistia; Stål, 1876

= Antistia (mantis) =

Genus of praying mantises

Antistia is a genus of mantises in the family Tarachodidae. There are at least four described species in the genus Antistia.

== Species ==
These four species belong to the genus Antistia:

- Antistia maculipennis Stal, 1876
- Antistia parva Beier, 1953
- Antistia robusta Kaltenbach, 1996
- Antistia vicina Kaltenbach, 1996

== See also ==
- List of mantis genera and species
