= Austrochaperina brevipes =

Conservation status
- Data Deficient (IUCN 3.1)

Scientific classification
- Kingdom: Animalia
- Phylum: Chordata
- Class: Amphibia
- Order: Anura
- Family: Microhylidae
- Genus: Austrochaperina
- Species: A. brevipes

Binomial name
- Austrochaperina brevipes (Boulenger, 1897)

Synonyms
- Liophryne brevipes (Boulenger, 1897); Sphenophryne brevipes (Boulenger, 1897)

Species of frog

Austrochaperina brevipes is a species of frog in the family Microhylidae. It is endemic to Papua New Guinea and known only from two localities, Mount Victoria and Myola Guest House in the Owen Stanley Range. Common name Victoria land frog has been suggested for it.

== Description ==
Austrochaperina brevipes is a stocky, relatively broad-headed frog. Males grow to 24 mm (0.94 in) and females 28 mm (1.1 in) in snout–vent length. Males appear to reach maturity at about 20 mm (0.79 in) and females at about 22 mm (0.87 in) SVL. The dorsum is reddish brown, brown, or yellowish brown. There is a yellow vertebral line.

This species probably breeds through direct development. A male was found attending 14 eggs, whereas a female of 22.9 mm (0.90 in) contained ten eggs.

== Habitat and conservation ==
The species' natural habitat is montane rainforest where they live in leaf litter and beneath logs. The threats to this poorly known species are unknown; this frog has not been seen since 1987.
