= Copiula obsti =

Conservation status
- Data Deficient (IUCN 3.1)

Scientific classification
- Kingdom: Animalia
- Phylum: Chordata
- Class: Amphibia
- Order: Anura
- Family: Microhylidae
- Genus: Copiula
- Species: C. obsti

Binomial name
- Copiula obsti Günther, 2002

Species of frog

Copiula obsti is a species of frog in the family Microhylidae. It is endemic to the Wondiwoi Mountains in West Papua, Indonesian New Guinea. It is known mature forest at elevations of 400–800 m (1,300–2,600 ft) above sea level. It lives under leaf litter on the forest floor. It is potentially threatened by habitat loss caused by logging.
