= Afrapia =

Afrapia Temporal range: Turonian

Scientific classification
- Kingdom: Animalia
- Phylum: Arthropoda
- Class: Insecta
- Order: Hymenoptera
- Family: †Maimetshidae
- Subfamily: †Maimetshinae
- Tribe: †Maimetshini
- Genus: †Afrapia; Rasnitsyn & Brothers, 2009

Type species
- †Afrapia globularis Rasnitsyn & Brothers, 2009

Species
- †Afrapia globularis Rasnitsyn & Brothers, 2009; †Afrapia variicornis Rasnitsyn & Brothers, 2009

Extinct genus of wasps

Afrapia is an extinct genus of wasp which existed in Botswana during the late Cretaceous period. It contains the species Afrapia globularis and Afrapia variicornis.
