= Ceroxys confluens =

Scientific classification
- Kingdom: Animalia
- Phylum: Arthropoda
- Clade: Pancrustacea
- Class: Insecta
- Order: Diptera
- Family: Ulidiidae
- Genus: Ceroxys
- Species: C. confluens

Binomial name
- Ceroxys confluens (Becker, 1907)

Synonyms
- Meckelia confluens Becker, 1907

Species of fly

Ceroxys confluens is a species of fly in the genus Ceroxys of the family Ulidiidae.
