= Austrochaperina yelaensis =

Conservation status
- Least Concern (IUCN 3.1)

Scientific classification
- Kingdom: Animalia
- Phylum: Chordata
- Class: Amphibia
- Order: Anura
- Family: Microhylidae
- Genus: Austrochaperina
- Species: A. yelaensis

Binomial name
- Austrochaperina yelaensis Zweifel, 2000

Species of frog

Austrochaperina yelaensis is a species of frog in the family Microhylidae endemic to Papua New Guinea. It was described by Richard G. Zweifel in 2000 from a holotype collected at 700 metres (2,300 ft) on the southern slopes of Mount Rossel, Rossel Island, Milne Bay Province. It has also been recorded on Vanatinai (Sudest Island). It was originally only known from a specimen found around 1960 but was rediscovered again at the original location and a new one at Vanatinai. The population is unknown as it is not uncommon but also not frequently found. There are no major threats to the species at present. It lives in the leaf litter of primary rainforest and cloud forest.
