= Austrochaperina macrorhyncha =

Conservation status
- Least Concern (IUCN 3.1)

Scientific classification
- Kingdom: Animalia
- Phylum: Chordata
- Class: Amphibia
- Order: Anura
- Family: Microhylidae
- Genus: Austrochaperina
- Species: A. macrorhyncha

Binomial name
- Austrochaperina macrorhyncha (van Kampen, 1906)

Synonyms
- Chaperina macrorhyncha van Kampen, 1906; Chaperina punctata van Kampen, 1913

Species of frog

Austrochaperina macrorhyncha is a species of frog in the family Microhylidae. It is endemic to West Papua, Indonesia. Its natural habitats are subtropical or tropical moist lowland forests and subtropical or tropical moist montane forests.

== Sources ==
- Richards, S. & Günther, R. 2004. Austrochaperina macrorhyncha. 2006 IUCN Red List of Threatened Species. Downloaded on 23 July 2007.
