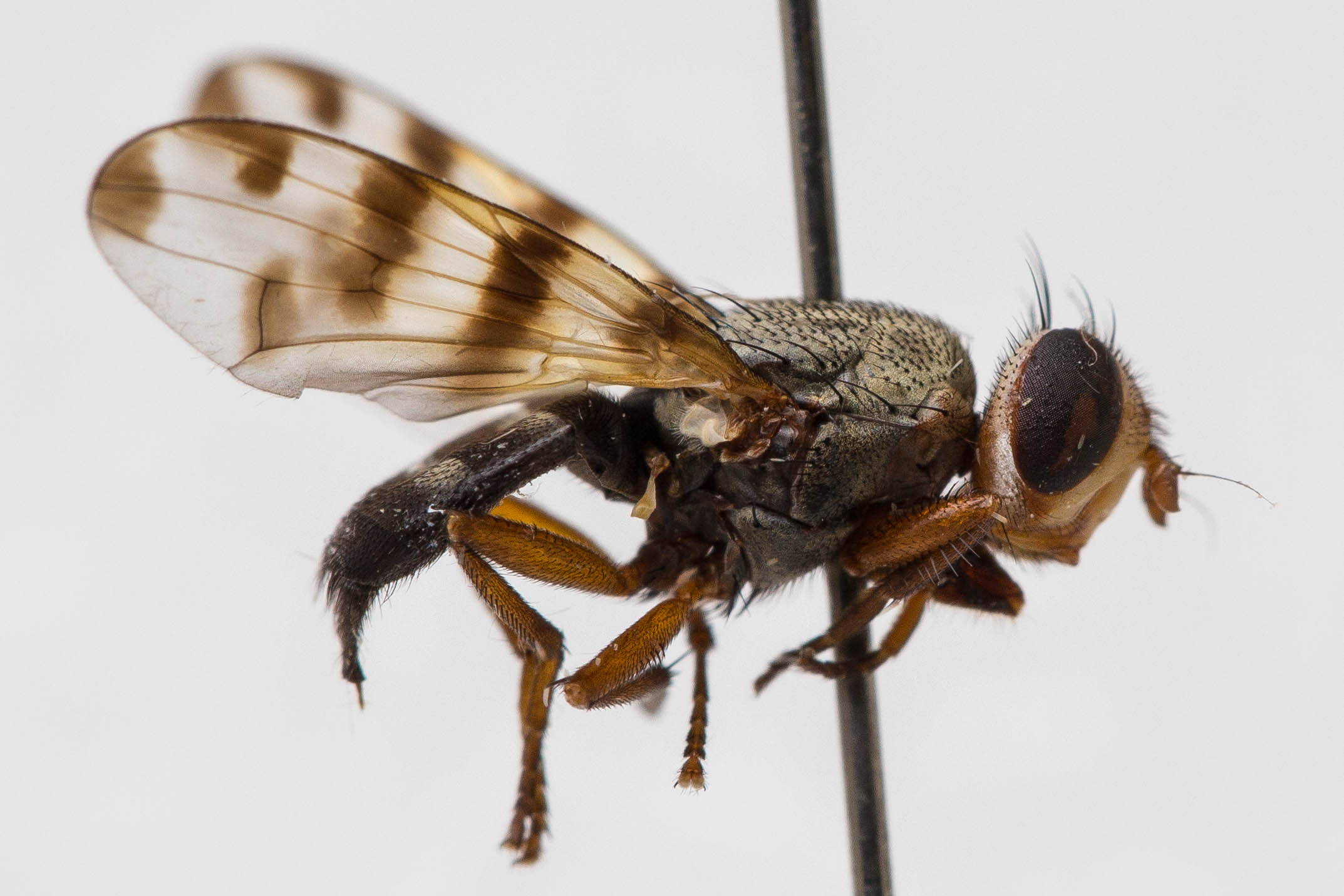

Scientific classification
- Kingdom: Animalia
- Phylum: Arthropoda
- Clade: Pancrustacea
- Class: Insecta
- Order: Diptera
- Family: Ulidiidae
- Genus: Ceroxys
- Species: C. latiusculus

Binomial name
- Ceroxys latiusculus (Loew, 1873)

Synonyms
- Anacampta latiuscula Loew, 1873

= Ceroxys latiusculus =

Species of fly

Ceroxys latiusculus, the narrow-banded picture-winged fly, is a species of fly in the genus Ceroxys of the family Ulidiidae. Adults are 9-12 mm in length. The abdomen is black with gray bands and the wings have distinctive markings. Larvae feed on Senecio.
