= Andyrossia =

Andyrossia Temporal range: Barremian

Scientific classification
- Kingdom: Animalia
- Phylum: Arthropoda
- Clade: Pancrustacea
- Class: Insecta
- Order: Hymenoptera
- Family: †Maimetshidae
- Subfamily: †Maimetshinae
- Tribe: †Maimetshini
- Genus: †Andyrossia; Rasnitsyn & Jarzembowski, 2000
- Species: †A. joyceae

Binomial name
- †Andyrossia joyceae (Rasnitsyn & Jarzembowski, 1998)

Synonyms
- Arossia Rasnitsyn & Jarzembowski, 1998

Extinct genus of wasps

Andyrossia is an extinct genus of wasp known from the Late Cretaceous Weald Clay of southern England, containing a single species, Andyrossia joyceae. It was first named by Rasnitsyn and Jarzembowski in 1998 as Arossia; this was later realised to be a junior homonym of a barnacle subgenus containing Concavus panamensis, and was replaced by the name Andyrossia in 2000.
