= Maimetshorapia =

Maimetshorapia Temporal range: Turonian

Scientific classification
- Kingdom: Animalia
- Phylum: Arthropoda
- Class: Insecta
- Order: Hymenoptera
- Family: †Maimetshidae
- Subfamily: †Maimetshinae
- Tribe: †Maimetshini
- Genus: †Maimetshorapia; Rasnitsyn & Brothers, 2009
- Species: †M. africana

Binomial name
- †Maimetshorapia africana Rasnitsyn & Brothers, 2009

Extinct genus of wasps

Maimetshorapia is an extinct genus of wasp which existed in Botswana during the late Cretaceous period, containing the single species Maimetshorapia africana.
