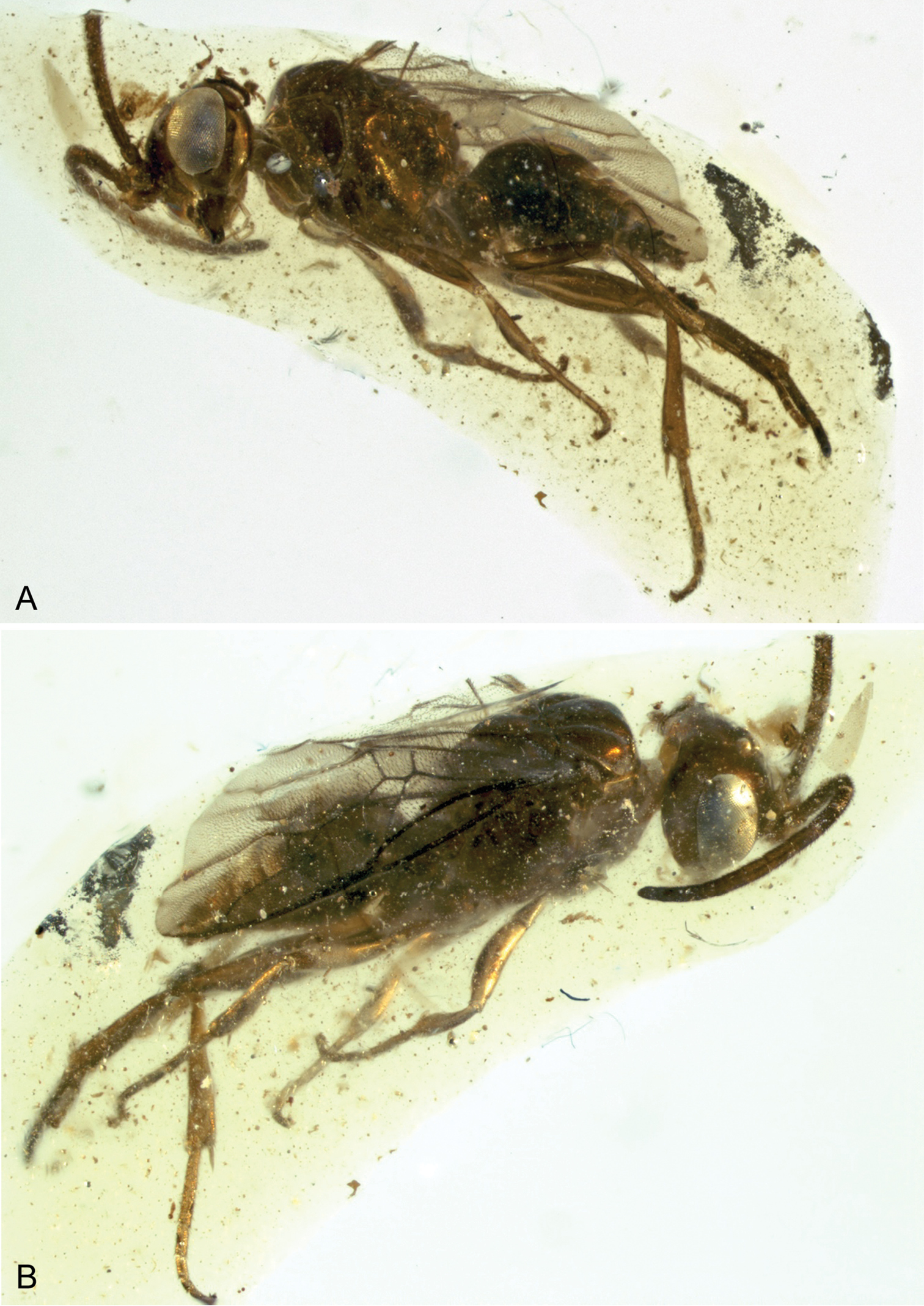
- Male of Guyotemaimetsha enigmatica

Scientific classification
- Kingdom: Animalia
- Phylum: Arthropoda
- Class: Insecta
- Order: Hymenoptera
- Suborder: Apocrita
- Superfamily: Trigonaloidea
- Family: †Maimetshidae; Rasnitsyn, 1975

= Maimetshidae =

Maimetshidae Temporal range: Cretaceous Barremian–Campanian

Extinct family of wasps

Maimetshidae is an extinct family of wasps, known from the Cretaceous period. While originally considered relatives of Megalyridae, they are now considered to probably be close relatives of Trigonalidae.

== Subdivisions ==
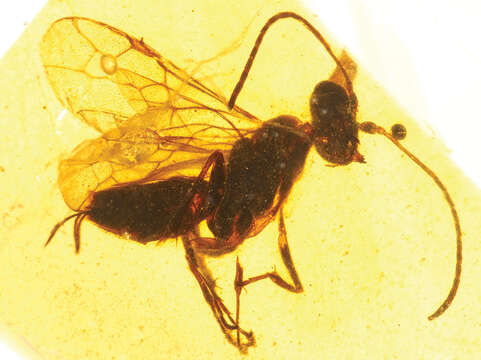
Iberomaimetsha fossil

- Subfamily †Maimetshinae Rasnitsyn 1975
  - Tribe †Ahiromaimetshini Engel 2016
    - †Ahiromaimetsha Perrichot et al. 2011 Lebanese amber, Early Cretaceous (Barremian)
    - †Turgonaliscus Engel 2016 Weald Clay, United Kingdom, Early Cretaceous (Barremian)
    - †Turgonalus Rasnitsyn 1990 Turga Formation, Zabaykalsky Krai, Russia, Early Cretaceous (Aptian)
  - Tribe †Maimetshini Rasnitsyn 1975
    - †Afrapia Rasnitsyn and Brothers 2009 Orapa, Botswana, Late Cretaceous (Turonian)
    - †Afromaimetsha Rasnitsyn and Brothers 2009 Orapa, Botswana, Late Cretaceous (Turonian)
    - †Ahstemiam McKellar and Engel 2011 Canadian amber, Late Cretaceous (Campanian)
    - †Andyrossia Rasnitsyn and Jarzembowski 2000 Weald Clay, United Kingdom, Early Cretaceous (Barremian)
    - †Burmaimetsha Perrichot 2013 Burmese amber, Myanmar, Cretaceous (Albian-Cenomanian)
    - †Cretogonalys Rasnitsyn 1977 Taimyr amber, Russia, Late Creaceous (Cenomanian)
    - †Guyotemaimetsha Perrichot et al. 2004 French amber (incl. Charentese amber), Late Cretaceous (Cenomanian)
    - †Iberomaimetsha Ortega-Blanco et al. 2011 Spanish amber, Escucha Formation, Spain, Early Cretaceous (Albian) Taimyr amber, Russia, Late Creaceous (Santonian)
    - †Maimetsha Rasnitsyn 1975 Taimyr amber, Russia, Late Creaceous (Santonian)
    - †Maimetshasia Perrichot 2013 Burmese amber, Myanmar, Cretaceous (Albian-Cenomanian)
    - †Maimetshorapia Rasnitsyn and Brothers 2009 Orapa, Botswana, Late Cretaceous (Turonian)
- Subfamily †Zorophratrinae Engel 2016
  - †Zorophratra Engel 2016 Lebanese amber, Early Cretaceous (Barremian)
