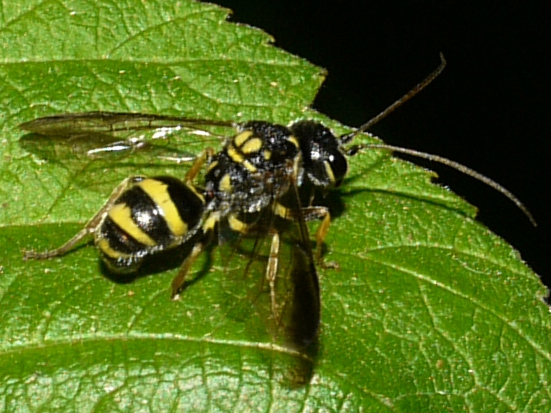

Scientific classification
- Kingdom: Animalia
- Phylum: Arthropoda
- Class: Insecta
- Order: Hymenoptera
- Family: Trigonalidae
- Genus: Taeniogonalos
- Species: T. gundlachii

Binomial name
- Taeniogonalos gundlachii (Cresson, 1865)

= Taeniogonalos gundlachii =

Species of wasp

Taeniogonalos gundlachii is a species of hymenopteran in the family Trigonalidae.
