= Northern Territory frog =

Conservation status
- Least Concern (IUCN 3.1)

Scientific classification
- Kingdom: Animalia
- Phylum: Chordata
- Class: Amphibia
- Order: Anura
- Family: Microhylidae
- Genus: Austrochaperina
- Species: A. adelphe

Binomial name
- Austrochaperina adelphe (Zweifel, 1985)

Synonyms
- Sphenophryne adelphe Zweifel, 1985

Species of amphibian

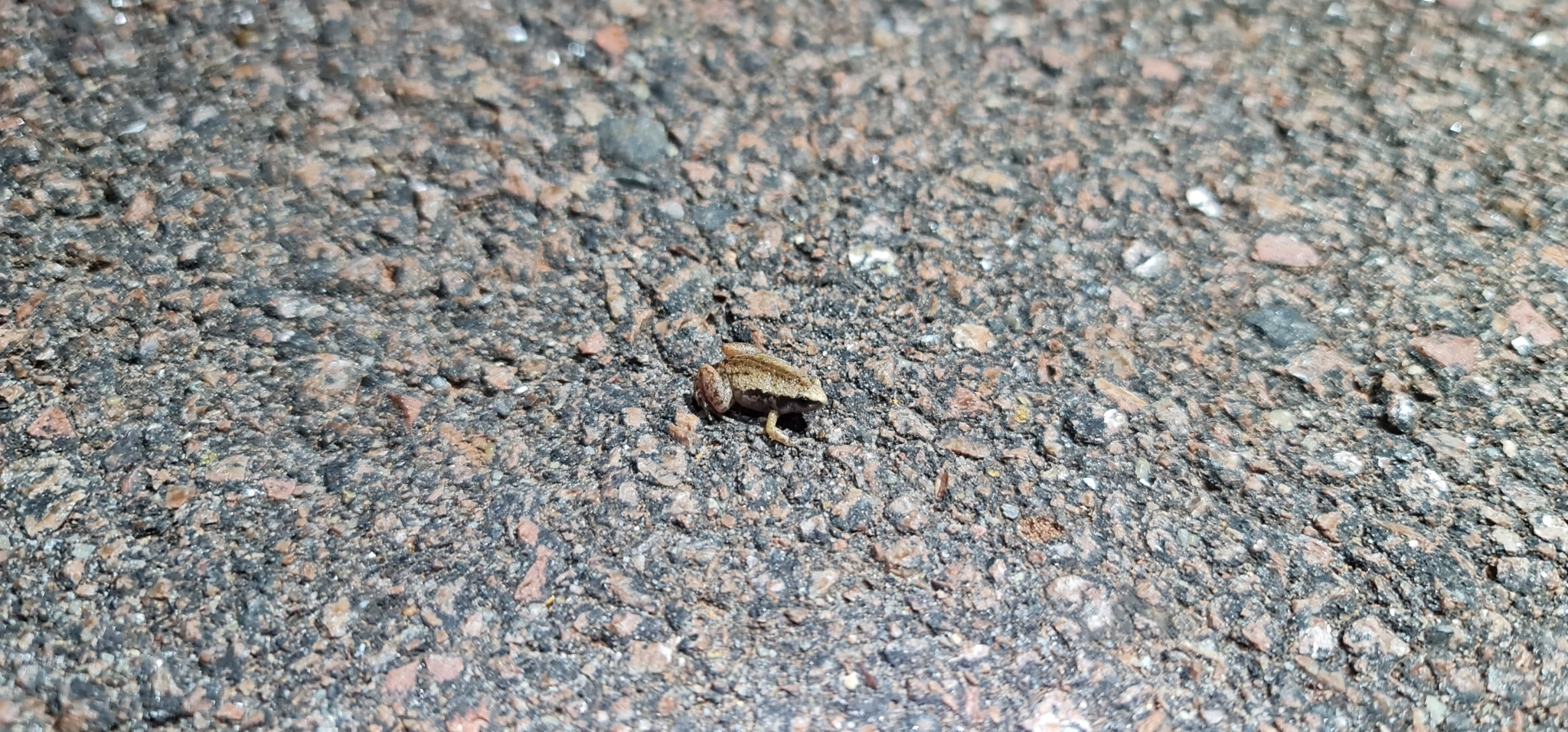
Northern Territory frog

The Northern Territory frog (Austrochaperina adelphe), also known as the peeping land frog, Top End chirper and Top End tiny frog, is a species of frog in the family Microhylidae. It is endemic to Australia. Its natural habitats are subtropical or tropical swamps, moist savanna, intermittent rivers, swamps, intermittent freshwater marshes, plantations, rural gardens, heavily degraded former forest, and canals and ditches.
