= Antistia parva =

Scientific classification
- Domain: Eukaryota
- Kingdom: Animalia
- Phylum: Arthropoda
- Class: Insecta
- Order: Mantodea
- Family: Eremiaphilidae
- Genus: Antistia
- Species: A. parva

Binomial name
- Antistia parva Beier, 1953

Species of praying mantis

Antistia parva is a species of praying mantis in the family Eremiaphilidae.

== See also ==
- List of mantis genera and species
