= Copiula pipiens =

Conservation status
- Least Concern (IUCN 3.1)

Scientific classification
- Kingdom: Animalia
- Phylum: Chordata
- Class: Amphibia
- Order: Anura
- Family: Microhylidae
- Genus: Copiula
- Species: C. pipiens

Binomial name
- Copiula pipiens Burton and Stocks, 1986

Species of frog

Copiula pipiens is a species of frog in the family Microhylidae. It is known from its type locality, Wirui near Wewak in the north coast of New Guinea, Papua New Guinea, and from the island of Yapen, off the north-western coast of New Guinea, in the West Papua province of Indonesia. The Yapen population might represent a different but closely related species. Common name Wirui Mehely frog has been coined for this species.

== Description ==
Adult males in the type series measure 23–25 mm (0.9–1.0 in) and the sole adult female 28 mm (1.1 in) in snout–vent length. The head is almost triangular, longer than it is broad. The snout is long and protruding. The eyes are small. The tympanum is visible; no supratympanic fold is present. The fingers and the toes bear small terminal discs and are unwebbed. The hind legs are moderately long. Skin is smooth. The dorsum has pale orange-pink ground color and is uniformly spotted. A faint mid-vertebral line is present. The ventral surfaces are creamy-white with brown markings; the vent region is suffused by orange-pink. Males have a single vocal sac.

The male advertisement call is a rapid series of high-pitched cheeps, emitted at a rate of about 10 notes/second for a period of up to 20 seconds. The dominant frequency is 4–5 kHz.

== Habitat and conservation ==
Copiula pipiens occurs in open secondary woodland slightly above sea level in the Wewak area, and in degraded forest on the Yapen Island at 620–680 m (2,030–2,230 ft) above sea level. Presumably, it has direct development (i.e., there is no free-living larval stage).

Copiula pipiens is a common species. Threats to it are not known but it appears to be able to persist in disturbed habitats. It occurs in the Yapen Nature Reserve, although logging is also taking place in the reserve.
