= Copiula oxyrhina =

Conservation status
- Least Concern (IUCN 3.1)

Scientific classification
- Kingdom: Animalia
- Phylum: Chordata
- Class: Amphibia
- Order: Anura
- Family: Microhylidae
- Genus: Copiula
- Species: C. oxyrhina

Binomial name
- Copiula oxyrhina (Boulenger, 1898)

Species of frog

Copiula oxyrhina is a species of frog in the family Microhylidae. It is endemic to Papua New Guinea. Its natural habitats are subtropical or tropical moist lowland forests, subtropical or tropical moist montane forests, subtropical or tropical seasonally wet or flooded lowland grassland, rural gardens, urban areas, and heavily degraded former forest.
