= Ceroxys amurensis =

Scientific classification
- Kingdom: Animalia
- Phylum: Arthropoda
- Class: Insecta
- Order: Diptera
- Family: Ulidiidae
- Subfamily: Otitinae
- Tribe: Otitini
- Genus: Ceroxys
- Species: C. amurensis

Binomial name
- Ceroxys amurensis Hennig, 1939

Synonyms
- Ceroxys hortulana amurensis Hennig, 1939

Species of fly

Ceroxys amurensis is a species of ulidiid or picture-winged fly in the genus Ceroxys of the family Tephritidae.

== Distribution ==
Korean Peninsula, Russia, China.
