= Copiula major =

Conservation status
- Data Deficient (IUCN 3.1)

Scientific classification
- Kingdom: Animalia
- Phylum: Chordata
- Class: Amphibia
- Order: Anura
- Family: Microhylidae
- Genus: Copiula
- Species: C. major

Binomial name
- Copiula major Günther, 2002

Species of frog

Copiula major is a species of frog in the family Microhylidae. It is found in West Papua, Indonesia and possibly Papua New Guinea. Its natural habitat is subtropical or tropical moist lowland forests. It is threatened by habitat loss.
