= Austrochaperina beehleri =

Conservation status
- Least Concern (IUCN 3.1)

Scientific classification
- Kingdom: Animalia
- Phylum: Chordata
- Class: Amphibia
- Order: Anura
- Family: Microhylidae
- Genus: Austrochaperina
- Species: A. beehleri

Binomial name
- Austrochaperina beehleri Günther & Richards, 2019

Synonyms
- Asterophrys beehleri (Günther & Richards, 2019)

Species of frog

Austrochaperina beehleri is a species of frog in the family Microhylidae. It is currently only known from three separate locations in Papua New Guinea, where it inhabits lowland rainforests at altitudes ranging from 110 to 380 m (360 to 1,250 ft).
