= Austrochaperina blumi =

Conservation status
- Least Concern (IUCN 3.1)

Scientific classification
- Kingdom: Animalia
- Phylum: Chordata
- Class: Amphibia
- Order: Anura
- Family: Microhylidae
- Genus: Austrochaperina
- Species: A. blumi

Binomial name
- Austrochaperina blumi Zweifel, 2000

Species of frog

Austrochaperina blumi is a species of frog in the family Microhylidae. It is endemic to New Guinea and known from the northern slopes of the New Guinean Central Range in Western New Guinea (Indonesia), and from the Bewani, Torricelli, and Hunstein Mountains in Papua New Guinea. The specific name blumi honors J. Paul Blum, the herpetologist who collected the type series. Common name Kosarek land frog has been proposed for it.

== Description ==
Adult males measure 23–24 mm (0.9–0.9 in) and adult females 23–26 mm (0.9–1.0 in) in snout–vent length. The head is relatively narrow. The snout is truncate. The eyes are relatively large. The tympanum is small and indistinct. The finger and toe tips bear grooved discs. No webbing is present. The dorsal surfaces of the head, body, and limbs are pale tan scattered with many small, somewhat darker, irregular spots. The ventral ground color is pale tan, approaching white, but bearing numerous small, slightly darker spots on the throat and chest and fewer spots on the abdomen.

== Habitat and conservation ==
Austrochaperina blumi occurs in disturbed habitats, including villages, lawns, and rural gardens, and presumably also in forests, at elevations of 340–1,840 m (1,120–6,040 ft) above sea level. It is locally very abundant. Presumably, development is direct (i.e, there is no free-living larval stage). It is a very adaptable species that probably is not facing any threats. It is not known to occur in any protected areas.
