= Austrochaperina hooglandi =

Conservation status
- Least Concern (IUCN 3.1)

Scientific classification
- Kingdom: Animalia
- Phylum: Chordata
- Class: Amphibia
- Order: Anura
- Family: Microhylidae
- Genus: Austrochaperina
- Species: A. hooglandi

Binomial name
- Austrochaperina hooglandi (Zweifel, 1967)

Synonyms
- Sphenophryne hooglandi (Zweifel, 1967)

Species of frog

Austrochaperina hooglandi is a species of frog in the family Microhylidae. It is endemic to Papua New Guinea. Its natural habitats are subtropical or tropical moist lowland forests and subtropical or tropical moist montane forests.
