= Austrochaperina aquilonia =

Conservation status
- Near Threatened (IUCN 3.1)

Scientific classification
- Kingdom: Animalia
- Phylum: Chordata
- Class: Amphibia
- Order: Anura
- Family: Microhylidae
- Genus: Austrochaperina
- Species: A. aquilonia

Binomial name
- Austrochaperina aquilonia Zweifel, 2000

Species of amphibian

Austrochaperina aquilonia is a species of frogs in the family Microhylidae. It is endemic to the Sandaun Province, north-western Papua New Guinea. It is only known from two nearby locations in the Torricelli Mountains: Mount Somoro (type locality) and from the village of Wilbeite. The specific name aquilonia is a Latin adjective meaning "northern" and refers to the range of this species in the north coast mountains of New Guinea.

Known range of Austrochaperina aquilonia in New Guinea

== Description ==
Austrochaperina aquilonia is only known from two specimens, both adult males: the holotype (collected by Jared Diamond) measuring 31 mm (1.2 in) in snout–vent length, and the paratype (collected by Tim Flannery) measuring 23 mm (0.91 in). It is a relatively slender-bodied species with a bluntly pointed snout. The hands are relatively small and have small finger discs. The toes are unwebbed. The dorsum is pale graybrown with darker brown irregular spotting and mottling.

== Habitat and conservation ==
Habitat data are missing but Austrochaperina aquilonia is believed to be a forest inhabitant. The specimens were collected somewhere between 730 and 1,420 m (2,400 and 4,660 ft) above sea level. There are no known threats to this little known species.
