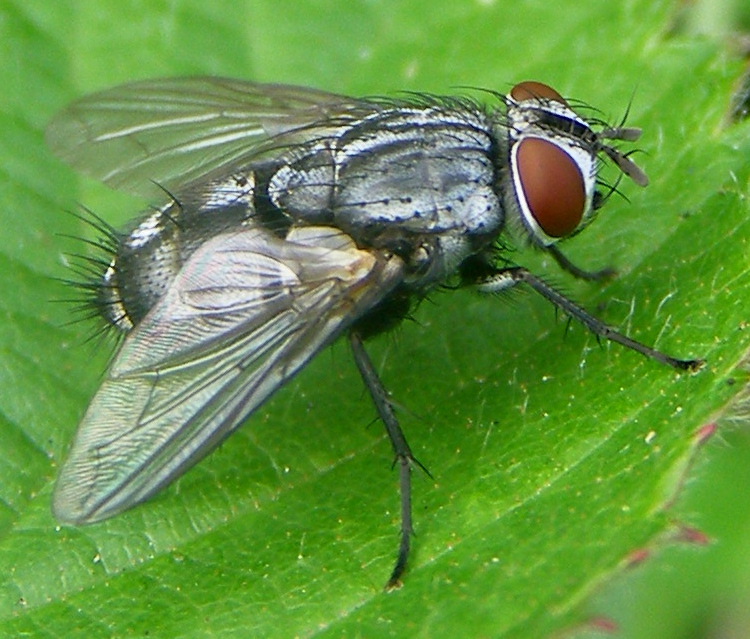

Scientific classification
- Kingdom: Animalia
- Phylum: Arthropoda
- Clade: Pancrustacea
- Class: Insecta
- Order: Diptera
- Family: Tachinidae
- Subfamily: Exoristinae
- Tribe: Goniini
- Genus: Sturmia
- Species: S. bella

Binomial name
- Sturmia bella (Meigen, 1824)

Synonyms
- Tachina bella Meigen, 1824; Blepharipa pupiphaga Rondani, 1861; Masicera robertii Macquart, 1851; Sturmia concolor Robineau-Desvoidy, 1830; Sturmia floricola Robineau-Desvoidy, 1830; Sturmia vanessae Robineau-Desvoidy, 1830; Tachina cymelus Walker, 1849; Tachina discrepanda Pandellé, 1896

= Sturmia bella =

Species of fly

Sturmia bella is a species of fly in the family Tachinidae. Larvae can parasitize over twenty lepidopteran species, such as Parantica sita.

== Distribution ==
British Isles, Czech Republic, Estonia, Hungary, Moldova, Poland, Romania, Slovakia, Ukraine, Finland, Bosnia and Herzegovina, Bulgaria, Corsica, Croatia, Greece, Italy, Montenegro, Portugal, Serbia, Spain, Turkey, Austria, Belgium, Channel Islands, France, Germany, Netherlands, Switzerland, Japan, South Korea, Israel, Palestine, Morocco, Russia, Armenia, Georgia, China, Japan , Nepal, Taiwan, New Caledonia, Solomon Islands
