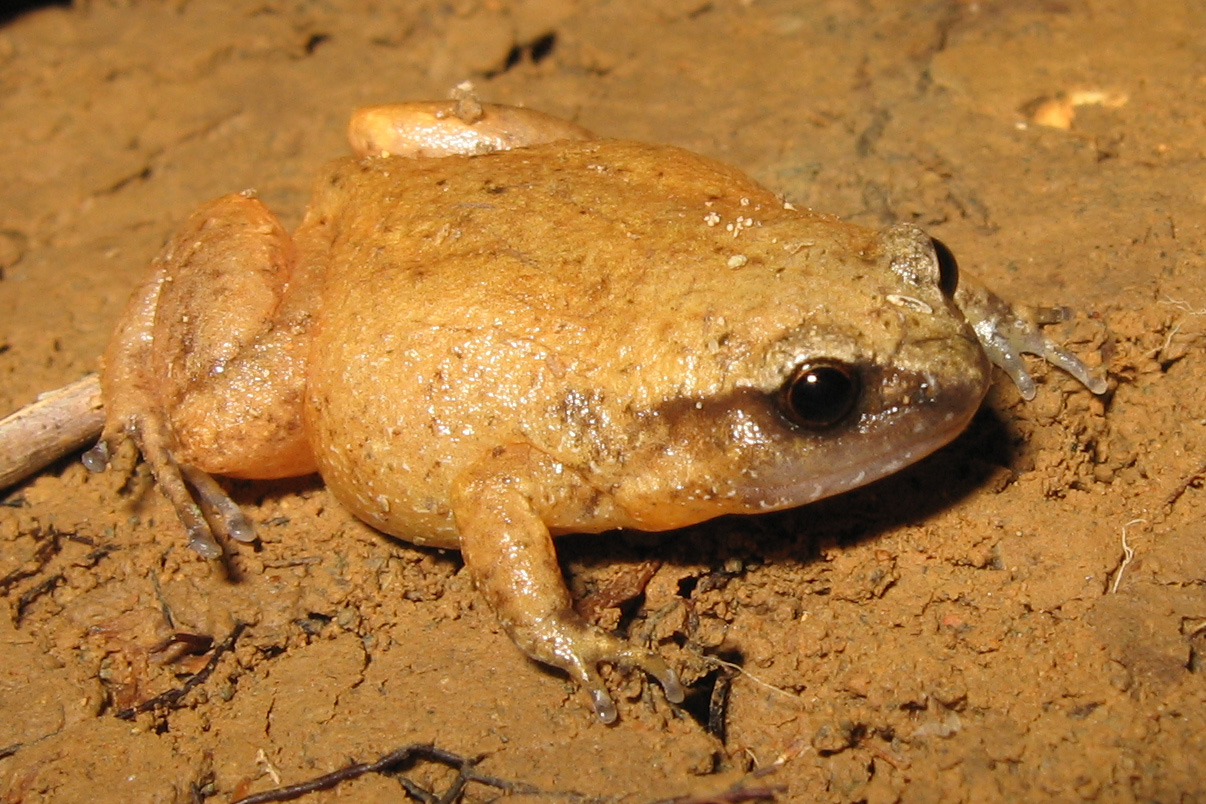

Conservation status
- Least Concern (IUCN 3.1)

Scientific classification
- Kingdom: Animalia
- Phylum: Chordata
- Class: Amphibia
- Order: Anura
- Family: Microhylidae
- Genus: Austrochaperina
- Species: A. fryi

Binomial name
- Austrochaperina fryi (Zweifel, 1962)

Synonyms
- Sphenophryne fryi (Zweifel, 1962)

= Fry's frog =

Species of amphibian

Fry's frog (Austrochaperina fryi) is a species of frog in the family Microhylidae. It is endemic to Australia. Its natural habitat is subtropical or tropical moist lowland forests. It is threatened by habitat loss.
