= Ceroxys pallidus =

Scientific classification
- Kingdom: Animalia
- Phylum: Arthropoda
- Clade: Pancrustacea
- Class: Insecta
- Order: Diptera
- Family: Ulidiidae
- Genus: Ceroxys
- Species: C. pallidus

Binomial name
- Ceroxys pallidus Steyskal, 1991

Species of fly

Ceroxys pallidus is a species of ulidiid or picture-winged fly in the genus Ceroxys of the family Ulidiidae.
