= Ceroxys munda =

Scientific classification
- Kingdom: Animalia
- Phylum: Arthropoda
- Clade: Pancrustacea
- Class: Insecta
- Order: Diptera
- Family: Ulidiidae
- Genus: Ceroxys
- Species: C. munda

Binomial name
- Ceroxys munda (Loew, 1868)

Synonyms
- Anacampta munda Loew, 1868

Species of fly

Ceroxys munda is a species of picture-winged fly in the genus Ceroxys of the family Ulidiidae found in Hungary, Slovakia, the Czech Republic, Ukraine, and Russia.
