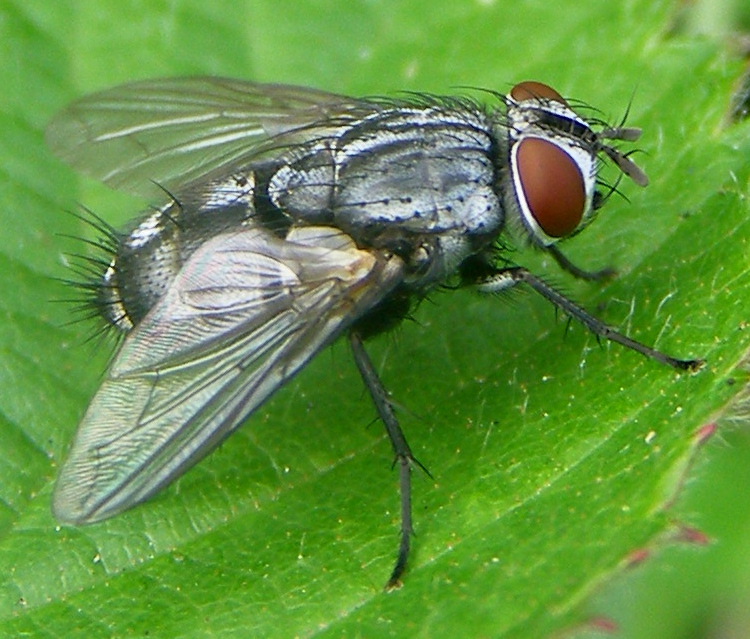
- Sturmia bella

Scientific classification
- Kingdom: Animalia
- Phylum: Arthropoda
- Clade: Pancrustacea
- Class: Insecta
- Order: Diptera
- Family: Tachinidae
- Subfamily: Exoristinae
- Tribe: Goniini
- Genus: Sturmia; Robineau-Desvoidy, 1830

Type species
- Sturmia vanessae Robineau-Desvoidy, 1830

Synonyms
- Oodigaster Macquart, 1854; Polychnomyia Bischof, 1904; Verbekeia Mesnil, 1959; Vodigaster Walker, 1858

= Sturmia =

Genus of flies

Sturmia is a genus of flies in the family Tachinidae.

== Species ==
- Sturmia bella (Meigen, 1824)
- Sturmia bellina Mesnil, 1944
- Sturmia consistens (Curran, 1927)
- Sturmia convergens (Wiedemann, 1824)
- Sturmia harrissinae Coquillett, 1897
- Sturmia lindneri (Mesnil, 1959)
- Sturmia micronychia Shima & Tachi, 2002
- Sturmia nigroscutellata Mesnil, 1970
- Sturmia oceanica Baranov, 1938
- Sturmia profana (Karsch, 1888)
- Sturmia rasa (Mesnil, 1959)
- Sturmia rasella (Mesnil, 1970)
- Sturmia velutina Mesnil, 1944
