= Cretogonalys =

Cretogonalys Temporal range: Cenomanian

Scientific classification
- Kingdom: Animalia
- Phylum: Arthropoda
- Class: Insecta
- Order: Hymenoptera
- Family: †Maimetshidae
- Subfamily: †Maimetshinae
- Tribe: †Maimetshini
- Genus: †Cretogonalys; Rasnitsyn, 1977
- Species: †C. taimyricus

Binomial name
- †Cretogonalys taimyricus Rasnitsyn, 1977

Extinct genus of wasps

Cretogonalys is an extinct genus of wasp which existed in Siberia during the late Cretaceous period, containing a single species, Cretogonalys taimyricus. It was described by Rasnitsyn in 1977.
