= Austrochaperina palmipes =

Conservation status
- Least Concern (IUCN 3.1)

Scientific classification
- Kingdom: Animalia
- Phylum: Chordata
- Class: Amphibia
- Order: Anura
- Family: Microhylidae
- Genus: Austrochaperina
- Species: A. palmipes

Binomial name
- Austrochaperina palmipes (Zweifel, 1956)

Synonyms
- Sphenophryne palmipes Zweifel, 1956

Species of frog

Austrochaperina palmipes is a species of frog in the family Microhylidae. It is endemic to Papua New Guinea. Its natural habitats are subtropical or tropical moist lowland forests, subtropical or tropical moist montane forests, rivers, and heavily degraded former forest.
