= Austrochaperina adamantina =

Conservation status
- Near Threatened (IUCN 3.1)

Scientific classification
- Kingdom: Animalia
- Phylum: Chordata
- Class: Amphibia
- Order: Anura
- Family: Microhylidae
- Genus: Austrochaperina
- Species: A. adamantina

Binomial name
- Austrochaperina adamantina Zweifel, 2000

Species of frog

Austrochaperina adamantina is a species of frog in the family Microhylidae. It is endemic to New Guinea and occurs in the Torricelli and Bewani Mountains in the West Sepik Province, Papua New Guinea. The specific name adamantina is Latin for "like a diamond" and refers to Jared Diamond, credited as the collector of the holotype and "great many other valuable herpetological specimens from Papua New Guinea".

== Description ==
Austrochaperina adamantina was described based on a single specimen, which is an adult female measuring 28 mm (1.1 in) in snout–vent length. The head is narrow. The snout is truncate as seen from above and slightly rounded in profile. The eyes are relatively large. The tympanic ring is barely visible; a weak supratympanic fold is present. The fingers and the toes have well-developed terminal discs but lack webbing. Skin is smooth apart from slight wartiness on the lower back. The dorsum is tan with indistinct darker mottling. There is a well-defined paler area on the side of face, from the upper lip from just below nostril to the tympanic fold. The lower surfaces are all pale with faint darker mottling that is slightly darker on the throat and the hind legs. The thighs are posteriorly pale with darker mottling.

== Habitat and conservation ==
Austrochaperina adamantina has been recorded from elevations between 340–1,550 m (1,120–5,090 ft) above sea level (the upper limit is imprecise and could be lower). Its ecological requirements are unknown but it is presumably a forest inhabitant that breeds by direct development (i.e, there is no free-living larval stage), as its congeners. Threats to it are unknown.
