= Copiula alpestris =

Conservation status
- Least Concern (IUCN 3.1)

Scientific classification
- Kingdom: Animalia
- Phylum: Chordata
- Class: Amphibia
- Order: Anura
- Family: Microhylidae
- Genus: Copiula
- Species: C. alpestris

Binomial name
- Copiula alpestris (Zweifel, 2000)

Synonyms
- Oxydactyla alpestris Zweifel, 2000

Species of frog

Copiula alpestris is a species of frog in the family Microhylidae. It is endemic to Papua New Guinea and known from the Western Highlands, Chimbu, and Eastern Highlands Provinces at elevations of 1,800–2,800 m (5,900–9,200 ft) above sea level. The specific name is a Latin adjective meaning "living in high mountains", in reference to its relatively high-altitude habitats. Based on molecular evidence, the species was transferred from Oxydactyla to Copiula in 2016.

== Description ==
Copiula alpestris is a stout, short-legged frog. Males grow to 27 mm (1.1 in) and females to 28 mm (1.1 in) in snout–vent length, although the maximum size is lower at many sites. The dorsum is medium brown. The side of the head and the eyelids are darker, approaching black. There are a few light flecks on the upper lips. There is also a dark brown streak that begins behind the eye, broadens as it passes above and behind the indistinct tympanum, and fades into the ground color posteriorly. The ventral ground color is pale tan. The fingers and toes are unwebbed and without discs.

== Habitat and conservation ==
Its natural habitats are montane forests where it occurs on saturated ground under moss. It is quite common. There are no known threats facing this species living in relatively isolated areas.
