= Maimetsha =

Maimetsha Temporal range: Turonian

Scientific classification
- Kingdom: Animalia
- Phylum: Arthropoda
- Class: Insecta
- Order: Hymenoptera
- Family: †Maimetshidae
- Subfamily: †Maimetshinae
- Tribe: †Maimetshini
- Genus: †Maimetsha; Rasnitsyn, 1975
- Species: †M. arctica

Binomial name
- †Maimetsha arctica Rasnitsyn, 1975

Extinct genus of wasps

Maimetsha arctica is an extinct genus of wasp which existed during the Cretaceous period, and the only species in the genus Maimetsha.
