= Austrochaperina kosarek =

Conservation status
- Data Deficient (IUCN 3.1)

Scientific classification
- Kingdom: Animalia
- Phylum: Chordata
- Class: Amphibia
- Order: Anura
- Family: Microhylidae
- Genus: Austrochaperina
- Species: A. kosarek

Binomial name
- Austrochaperina kosarek Zweifel, 2000
- A. kosarek is only known from its type locality, Kosarek, in Western New Guinea

Species of frog

Austrochaperina kosarek is a species of frog in the family Microhylidae. It is endemic to New Guinea and only known from its type locality, Kosarek, in West Papua (Indonesia). It is only known from one specimen collected in 1979. It has not been well-studied but it might be widespread in suitable habitat.

== Description ==
The holotype is an adult female measuring 21 mm (0.8 in) in snout–vent length. The head almost as wide as the body. The snout is tapering to a sharply rounded tip but is rounded and slightly projecting in profile. The eyes are large. The tympanic annulus is obscure; a weak postorbital-supratympanic fold is present. The legs are short. The finger tips are flattened and disc-like, but only the disc of the third finger is broader than the penultimate phalanx; discs have somewhat broader discs. No webbing is present. The dorsum is light brown with obscure, small, darker markings and a dark mark above the cloacal opening. The snout is gray above, almost white on its tip. The chin and chest are dark brown with small light spots, in contrast to the pale abdomen irregularly spotted with brown.

== Habitat and conservation ==
The holotype was collected from Kosarek at 1,400 m (4,600 ft) above sea level. No further information on its habitat is available, but it presumably occurs in rainforest and has direct development (i.e., there is no free-living larval stage).

Sufficient data to assess conservation status of this species are lacking. Threats to it are poorly known, but not much forest is left in the area of the type locality.
