= Copiula tyleri =

Conservation status
- Least Concern (IUCN 3.1)

Scientific classification
- Kingdom: Animalia
- Phylum: Chordata
- Class: Amphibia
- Order: Anura
- Family: Microhylidae
- Genus: Copiula
- Species: C. tyleri

Binomial name
- Copiula tyleri Burton, 1990

Species of frog

Copiula tyleri is a species of frog in the family Microhylidae. It is endemic to northeastern New Guinea and is found in both Western New Guinea (Cyclops Mountains) and Papua New Guinea (Bewani, Torricelli, Hunstein, and Adelbert Ranges). The specific name tyleri honours Michael J. Tyler, Australian herpetologist who have worked extensively with Australian and New Guinean frogs.

== Description ==
Adult males measure 19.6–24.5 mm (0.77–0.96 in) and females 24.2–25.5 mm (0.95–1.00 in) in snout–vent length. The tympanum is conspicuous and unpigmented. The snout is relatively short and broad. Fingers and toes are without webbing. Skin is smooth. The dorsum is dark brown. There are dark post-orbital bands. The iris is dark brown, approaching black, with tiny golden flecks.

== Habitat and conservation ==
Its natural habitats are tropical lowland and hill rainforests at elevations of 670–1,220 m (2,200–4,000 ft) above sea level. One specimen was found hiding beneath a broad leaf on the forest floor at daytime, and once uncovered, tried to hide in a hole in the ground.

Copiula tyleri is a common species with no known major threats. It occurs in the Cyclops Mountains Nature Reserve.
