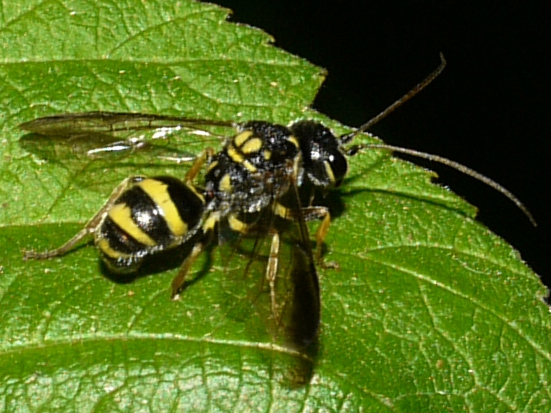
- Taeniogonalos gundlachii in the northern United States
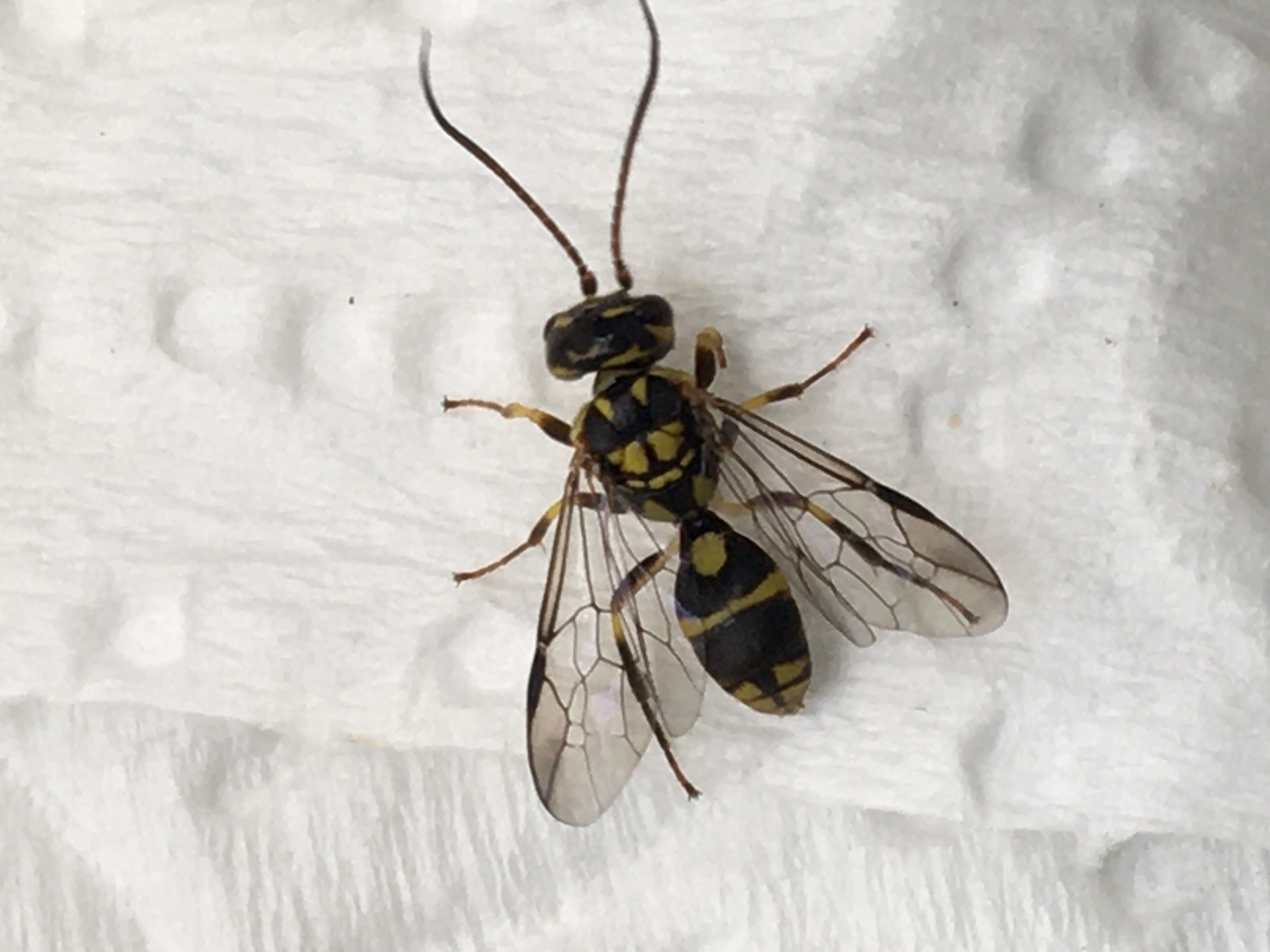
- Taeniogonalos gestroi found in Peninsular Malaysia

Scientific classification
- Kingdom: Animalia
- Phylum: Arthropoda
- Class: Insecta
- Order: Hymenoptera
- Family: Trigonalidae
- Genus: Taeniogonalos; Schultz, 1906

Species
- 53 or so, see text

Synonyms
- Labidogonalos Schulz, 1906; Poecilogonalos Schulz, 1906; Nanogonalos Schulz, 1906; Ischnogonalos Schulz, 1907; Lycogastroides Strand, 1912; Lycogonalos Bischoff, 1913; Taiwanogonalos Tsuneki, 1991

= Taeniogonalos =

Genus of wasps

Taeniogonalos is a genus of wasps in the family Trigonalidae.

== Species ==
There are 53 or so described species, including:

- Taeniogonalos alticola (Tsuneki, 1991)
- Taeniogonalos bucarinata Chen, van Achterberg, He & Xu, 2014
- Taeniogonalos chadwicki (Riek, 1954)
- Taeniogonalos cordata Chen, van Achterberg, He & Xu, 2014
- Taeniogonalos enderleini (De Santis 1980)
- Taeniogonalos eurysoma Chen & van Achterberg, 2020
- Taeniogonalos fasciata (Strand, 1913)
- Taeniogonalos fasciatipennis (Cameron, 1897)
- Taeniogonalos flavicincta (Bischoff, 1913)
- Taeniogonalos flavocincta (Teranishi, 1929)
- Taeniogonalos flavoscutellata (Chen, 1949)
- Taeniogonalos geminata Chen, van Achterberg, He & Xu, 2014
- Taeniogonalos gestroi Schulz, 1906
- Taeniogonalos gracilicornis (Strand, 1912)
- Taeniogonalos gundlachii (Cresson, 1865)
- Taeniogonalos henicospili (Rohwer, 1929)
- Taeniogonalos intermedia (Chen, 1949)
- Taeniogonalos javana (Bischoff, 1933)
- Taeniogonalos jucunda (Westwood, 1868)
- Taeniogonalos kerala (Ayyar, 1919)
- Taeniogonalos lachrymosa (Westwood, 1874)
- Taeniogonalos lugubris (Westwood, 1868)
- Taeniogonalos maculata (Smith, 1851)
- Taeniogonalos maga (Teranishi, 1929)
- Taeniogonalos maschuna (Schulz, 1907)
- Taeniogonalos maynei (Benoit, 1950)
- Taeniogonalos mongolica (Popov, 1945)
- Taeniogonalos ornata (Smith, 1861)
- Taeniogonalos pictifrons (Smith, 1861)
- Taeniogonalos pictipennis (Strand, 1914)
- Taeniogonalos raymenti Carmean & Kimsey, 1998
- Taeniogonalos rufofasciata (Chen, 1949)
- Taeniogonalos sauteri (Bischoff, 1933)
- Taeniogonalos schulzi (Bischoff, 1933)
- Taeniogonalos sculpturata Chen, van Achterberg, He & Xu, 2014
- Taeniogonalos semibrunnea (Bischoff, 1951)
- Taeniogonalos subtruncata Schulz, 1906
- Taeniogonalos taihorina (Bischoff, 1914)
- Taeniogonalos tenebrosa (Riek, 1954)
- Taeniogonalos thwaitesii (Westwood, 1874)
- Taeniogonalos triangulata Chen, van Achterberg, He & Xu, 2014
- Taeniogonalos tricolor Chen, 1949
- Taeniogonalos tricolorisoma Chen, van Achterberg, He & Xu, 2014
- Taeniogonalos uncifera Chen, van Achterberg, He & Xu, 2014
- Taeniogonalos venatoria (Riek, 1962)
- Taeniogonalos woodorum (Smith, 2012)
- Taeniogonalos zairensis (Benoit, 1950)
- Taeniogonalos zimmeri (Bischoff, 1933)
