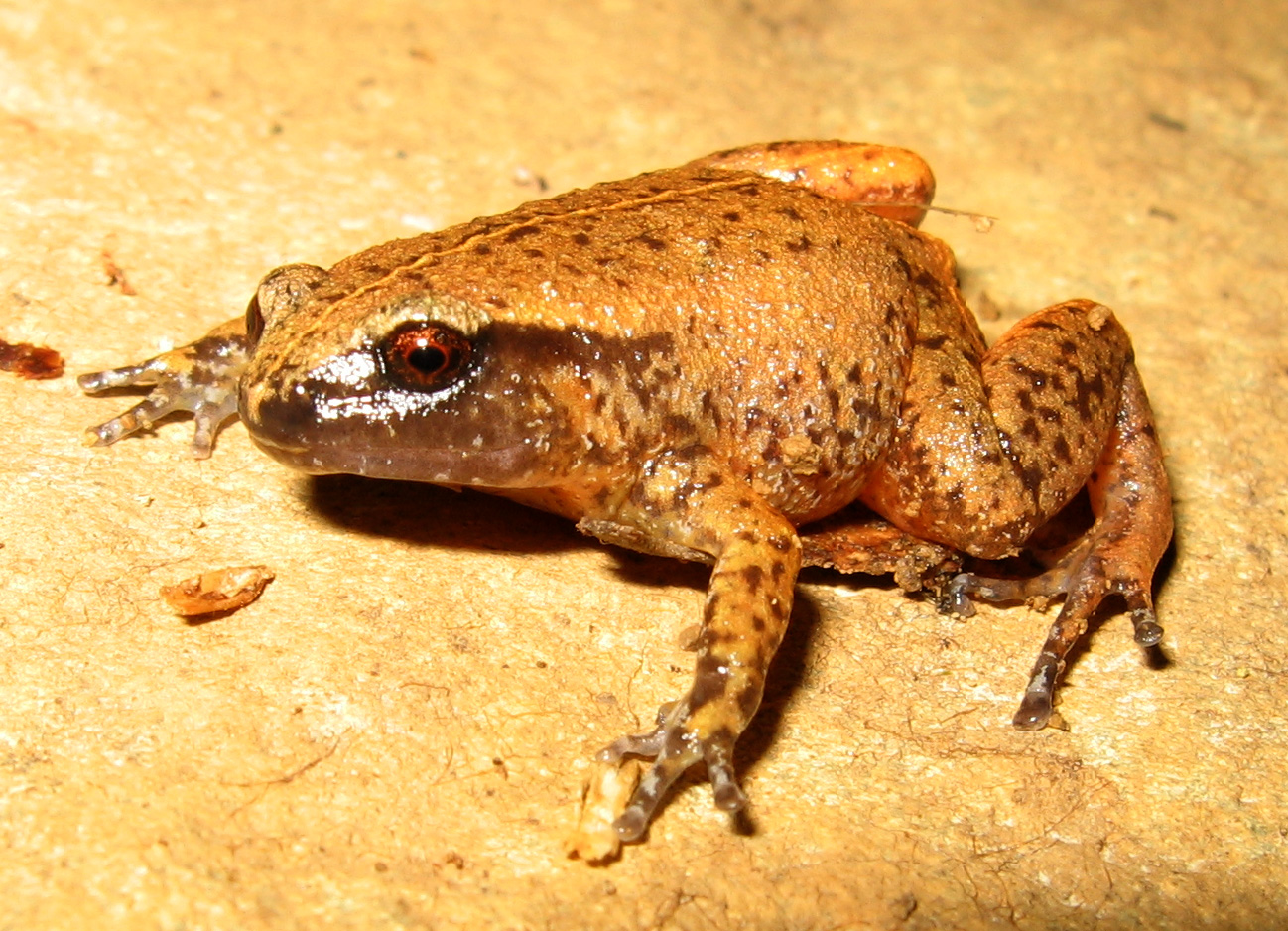

Conservation status
- Least Concern (IUCN 3.1)

Scientific classification
- Kingdom: Animalia
- Phylum: Chordata
- Class: Amphibia
- Order: Anura
- Family: Microhylidae
- Genus: Austrochaperina
- Species: A. pluvialis

Binomial name
- Austrochaperina pluvialis (Zweifel, 1965)

Synonyms
- Sphenophryne pluvialis Zweifel, 1965

= Austrochaperina pluvialis =

Species of amphibian

Austrochaperina pluvialis, also known as the rain frog, white-browed chirper, flecked land frog, or whitebrowed whistle frog, is a species of frog in the family Microhylidae. It is endemic to northeastern Queensland, Australia.

== Habitat and conservation ==
Austrochaperina pluvialis occurs in rainforests at elevations up to at least 900 m (3,000 ft), and at least historically, to 1,300 m (4,300 ft) above sea level. They are usually found beneath fallen timber and leaf litter. Males call from beneath leaves on the forest floor. Eggs are deposited terrestrially and have direct development, hatching as fully formed froglets.

Austrochaperina pluvialis is an infrequently seen species that appears patchily distributed because of difficulty of encountering it. In the past it has been threatened by habitat loss caused by logging. At present, development for tourism could represent a localized threat.
