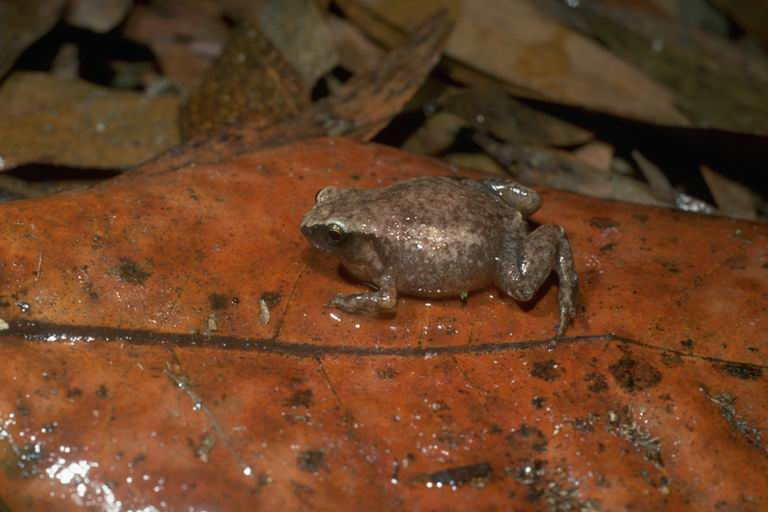

Conservation status
- Least Concern (IUCN 3.1)

Scientific classification
- Kingdom: Animalia
- Phylum: Chordata
- Class: Amphibia
- Order: Anura
- Family: Microhylidae
- Genus: Austrochaperina
- Species: A. robusta

Binomial name
- Austrochaperina robusta Fry, 1912

Synonyms
- Sphenophryne robusta Fry, 1912

= Robust frog =

Species of amphibian

The robust frog (Austrochaperina robusta) is a species of frog in the family Microhylidae. It is endemic to Australia. Its natural habitats are subtropical or tropical moist lowland forests and subtropical or tropical moist montane forests. It is threatened by habitat loss.
