= Afromaimetsha =

Afromaimetsha Temporal range: Turonian

Scientific classification
- Kingdom: Animalia
- Phylum: Arthropoda
- Class: Insecta
- Order: Hymenoptera
- Family: †Maimetshidae
- Subfamily: †Maimetshinae
- Tribe: †Maimetshini
- Genus: †Afromaimetsha; Rasnitsyn & Brothers, 2009
- Species: †A. robusta

Binomial name
- †Afromaimetsha robusta Rasnitsyn & Brothers, 2009

Genus of wasps

Afromaimetsha robusta is an extinct species of wasp which existed in Botswana during the late Cretaceous period, and the only species in the genus Afromaimetsha.
