= Ceroxys robusta =

Scientific classification
- Kingdom: Animalia
- Phylum: Arthropoda
- Clade: Pancrustacea
- Class: Insecta
- Order: Diptera
- Family: Ulidiidae
- Genus: Ceroxys
- Species: C. robusta

Binomial name
- Ceroxys robusta (Loew, 1873)

Synonyms
- Anacampta robusta Loew, 1873

Species of fly

Ceroxys robusta is a species of fly in the genus Ceroxys of the family Ulidiidae.
