= Slender frog =

Conservation status
- Least Concern (IUCN 3.1)

Scientific classification
- Kingdom: Animalia
- Phylum: Chordata
- Class: Amphibia
- Order: Anura
- Family: Microhylidae
- Genus: Austrochaperina
- Species: A. gracilipes

Binomial name
- Austrochaperina gracilipes (Nieden, 1926)

Synonyms
- Sphenophryne gracilipes Nieden, 1926

Species of amphibian

The slender frog (Austrochaperina gracilipes) is a species of frog in the family Microhylidae. It is found in Australia and New Guinea. Its natural habitats are subtropical or tropical dry forests, subtropical or tropical swamps, moist savanna, rivers, and intermittent rivers.
