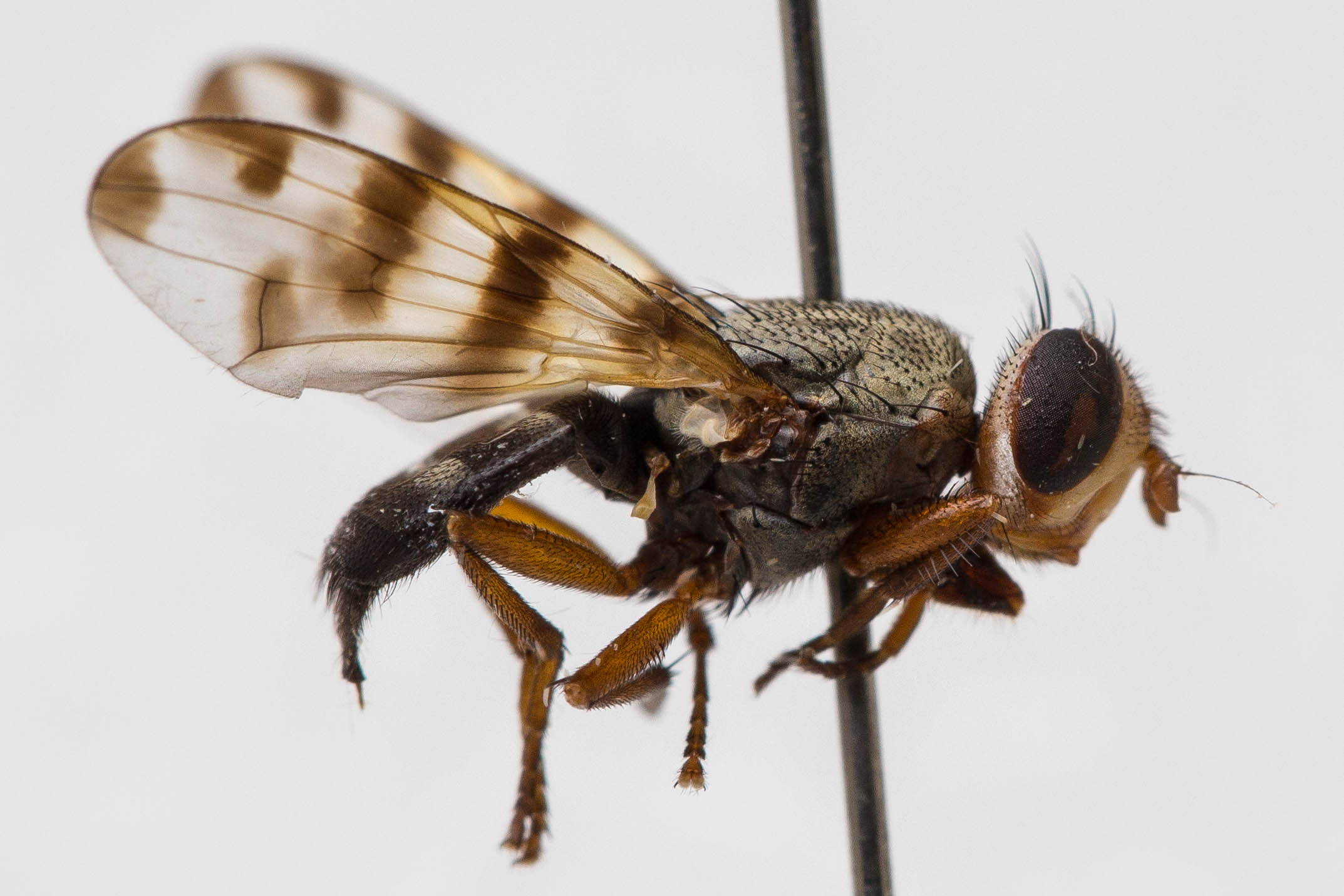
- Side view of Ceroxys latiusculus

Scientific classification
- Kingdom: Animalia
- Phylum: Arthropoda
- Clade: Pancrustacea
- Class: Insecta
- Order: Diptera
- Family: Ulidiidae
- Subfamily: Otitinae
- Tribe: Otitini
- Genus: Ceroxys; Macquart 1835

Type species
- Musca urticae Linnaeus, 1758

Synonyms
- Anacampta Loew, 1868; Ceratoxys Rondani, 1861; Engytortalis Hendel, 1935; Holodasia Loew, 1869

= Ceroxys =

Genus of flies

Ceroxys is a genus of picture-winged flies in the family Ulidiidae.

== Species ==
- Ceroxys amurensis Hennig, 1939
- Ceroxys baneai Gheorghiu, 1994
- Ceroxys cinifera (Loew, 1846)
- Ceroxys confluens (Becker, 1907)
- Ceroxys confusa (Becker, 1912)
- Ceroxys connexa (Becker, 1907)
- Ceroxys flavoscutellata (Hendel, 1935)
- Ceroxys fraudulosa (Loew, 1864)
- Ceroxys friasi Steyskal, 1991
- Ceroxys hyalinata (Panzer, 1798)
- Ceroxys laticornis (Loew, 1873)
- Ceroxys latiusculus (Loew, 1873)
- Ceroxys morosa (Loew, 1873)
- Ceroxys munda (Loew, 1868)
- Ceroxys pallidus Steyskal, 1991
- Ceroxys robusta (Loew, 1873)
- Ceroxys splendens (Becker, 1907)
- Ceroxys urticae (Linnaeus, 1758)
- Ceroxys zaidami (Becker, 1907)
