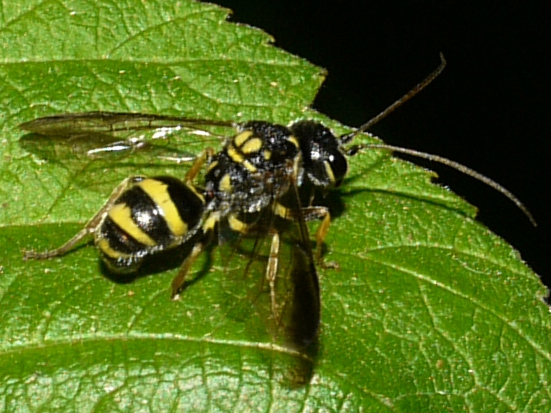
- Taeniogonalos gundlachii in the northern US
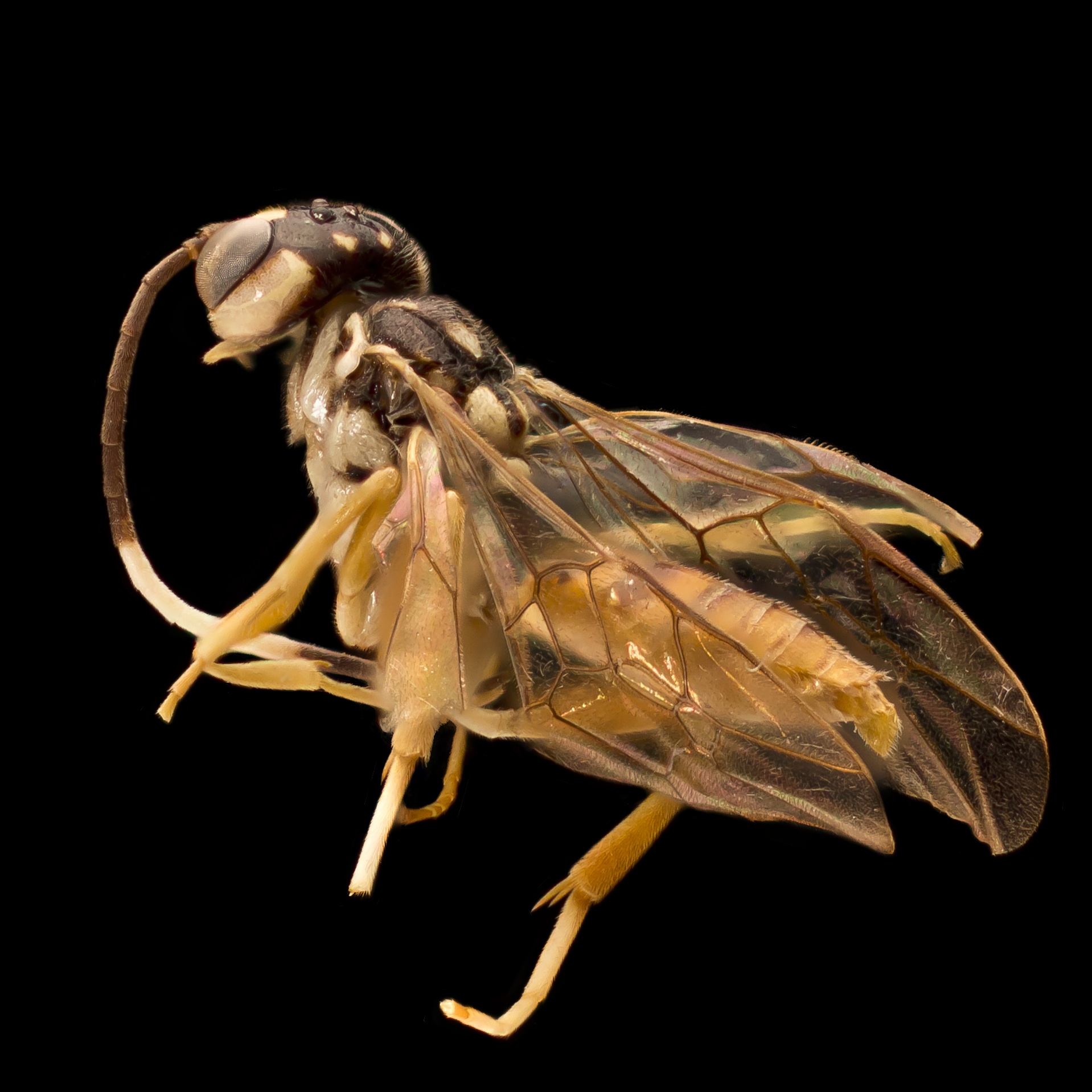
- Orthogonalys pulchella

Scientific classification
- Kingdom: Animalia
- Phylum: Arthropoda
- Clade: Pancrustacea
- Class: Insecta
- Order: Hymenoptera
- Suborder: Apocrita
- Superfamily: Trigonaloidea
- Family: Trigonalidae; Cresson, 1887

Genera
- See text

Synonyms
- Trigonalyidae Krieger, 1894

= Trigonalidae =

Trigonalidae Temporal range: Eocene–Present

Family of wasps

Trigonalidae is a family of parasitic wasps in the suborder Apocrita. They are the only living members of the superfamily Trigonaloidea. Trigonalidae are divided into 2 subfamilies; Orthogonalinae and Trigonalinae. These wasps are extremely rare, but surprisingly diverse, with over 90 species in 16 genera, and are known from all parts of the world. It is possibly the sister group to all Aculeata.

== Ecology ==
What little is known about the biology of these insects indicates a remarkably improbable life history: in nearly all known species, females lay thousands of minute eggs, "clamping" them to the edges of, or injecting them inside leaves. The egg must then be consumed by a caterpillar. Once inside the caterpillar, the trigonalid egg either hatches and attacks any other parasitoid larvae (including its siblings) in the caterpillar, or it waits until the caterpillar is killed and fed to a vespid larva, which it then attacks. If the caterpillar is neither attacked by another parasitoid nor fed to a vespid, the trigonalid larva fails to develop. Therefore, they are parasitoids or hyperparasitoids, but in a manner virtually unique among the insects, in that the eggs must be swallowed by a host, and even more unusual in that there may be an intermediate host. A few species are known exceptions, which directly parasitise sawflies.

== Nomenclature ==
The name of this family has also been spelled "Trigonaloidae" and "Trigonalyidae". These are incorrect under Article 29.5 of the ICZN. (Note: ICZN Code 29.5. Maintenance of current spellings. If a spelling of a family-group name was not formed in accordance with Article 29.3 but is in prevailing usage, that spelling is to be maintained, whether or not it is the original spelling and whether or not its derivation from the name of the type genus is in accordance with the grammatical procedures in Articles 29.3.1 and 29.3.2.) Despite this, some authors have continued to use the latter, "Trigonalyidae" spelling.

== Taxonomy ==
The fossil record of the family is poor, and there are no confirmed members of the family prior to the Cenozoic, with the oldest being from the Ypresian Eocene Okanagan Highlands in western North America. A possible specimen is known from the mid-Cretaceous Burmese amber of Myanmar, but this differs substantially from modern members of the family, and may belong to the stem-group. Suggested relatives of Trigonalidae within Trigonaloidea include the extinct family Maimetshidae, known from the Cretaceous period.

=== Genera ===
- Afrigonalys
- Bakeronymus
- Bareogonalos
- †Eotrigonalis
- Ischnogonalos
- Jezonogonalos
- Lycogaster
- Mimelogonalos
- Nomadina
- Orthogonalys
- Pseudogonalos
- Pseudonomadina
- Seminota
- Taeniogonalos
- Teranishia
- Trigonalys
- Xanthogonalos
