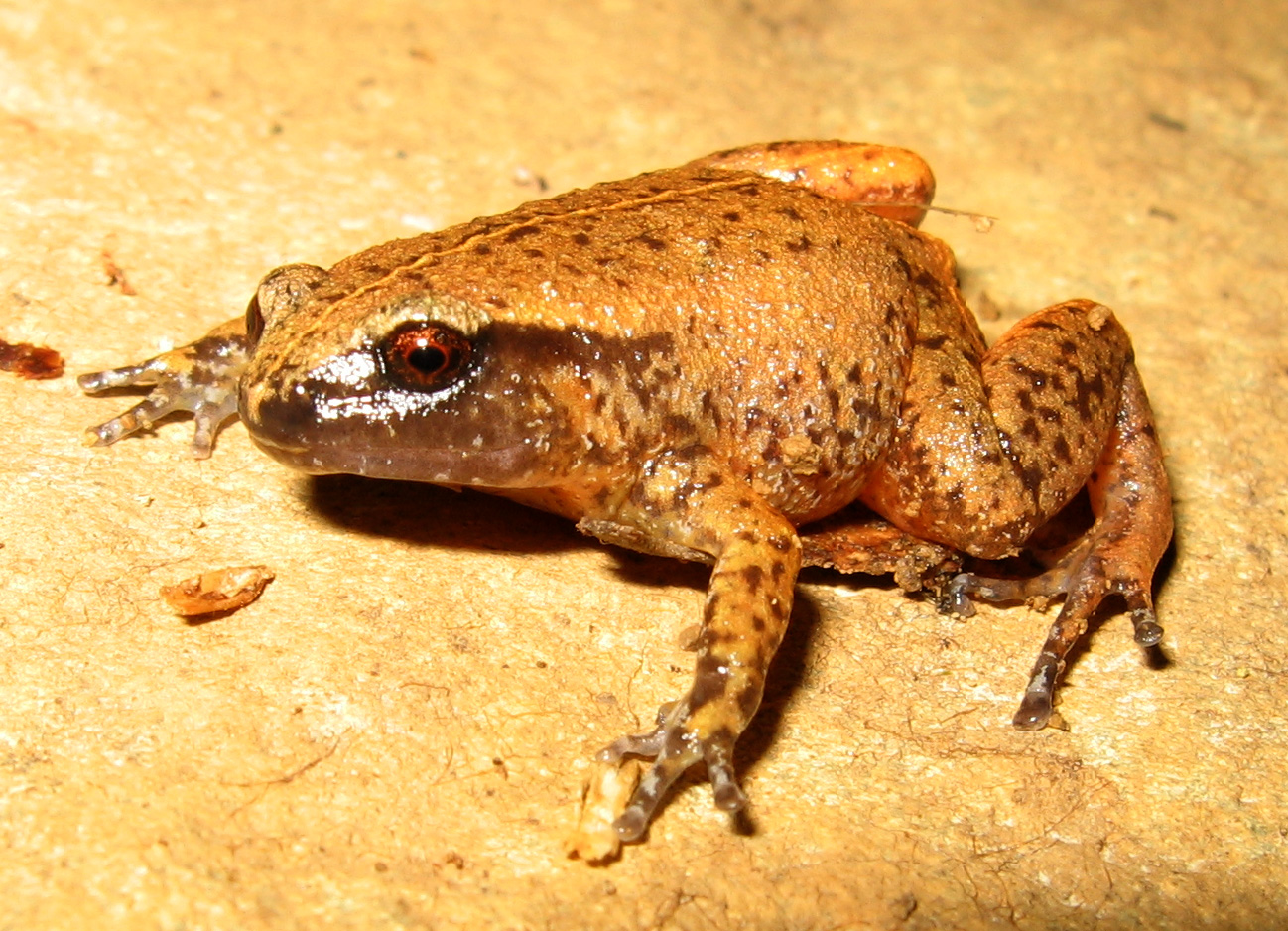
- The rain frog Austrochaperina pluvialis

Scientific classification
- Domain: Eukaryota
- Kingdom: Animalia
- Phylum: Chordata
- Class: Amphibia
- Order: Anura
- Family: Microhylidae
- Subfamily: Asterophryinae
- Genus: Austrochaperina; Fry, 1912

Type species
- Austrochaperina robusta Fry, 1912

Species
- See text

= Austrochaperina =

Genus of amphibians

Austrochaperina is a genus of microhylid frogs found on New Guinea, New Britain and Australia.

== Taxonomy ==
The genus was removed from the synonymy of Sphenophryne by Richard Zweifel in 2000. However, as currently defined, it might not be monophyletic, with two monophyletic units of Austrochaperina more closely related to parts of Copiula than with each other.

== Description ==
Austrochaperina are rather generalized frogs in their morphology and appear mostly to inhabit leaf litter. They reach maximum sizes between 20 and 50 mm (0.79 and 1.97 in) snout–vent length. Finger and toe tips are flattened and disc-like. Most species lack toe webbing.

== Species ==
The following species are recognised in the genus Austrochaperina:

- Austrochaperina adamantina (Zweifel, 2000)
- Austrochaperina adelphe (Zweifel, 1985) — Peeping land frog
- Austrochaperina alexanderi (Günther, Richards, and Dahl, 2014)
- Austrochaperina aquilonia (Zweifel, 2000)
- Austrochaperina archboldi (Zweifel, 2000)
- Austrochaperina basipalmata (Van Kampen, 1906)
- Austrochaperina beehleri (Günther and Richards, 2019)
- Austrochaperina blumi (Zweifel, 2000)
- Austrochaperina brachypus (Günther and Richards, 2019)
- Austrochaperina brevipes (Boulenger, 1897) — Victoria land frog
- Austrochaperina fryi (Zweifel, 1962) — Whistling land frog
- Austrochaperina fulva (Günther and Richards, 2019)
- Austrochaperina gracilipes (Fry, 1912) — Golden land frog
- Austrochaperina hooglandi (Zweifel, 1967) — New Guinea land frog
- Austrochaperina kosarek (Zweifel, 2000)
- Austrochaperina laurae (Günther, Richards, and Dahl, 2014)
- Austrochaperina macrorhyncha (Van Kampen, 1906) — Manikion land frog
- Austrochaperina mehelyi (Parker, 1934) — Mehely's land frog
- Austrochaperina minutissima (Günther, 2009)
- Austrochaperina novaebritanniae (Zweifel, 2000)
- Austrochaperina palmipes (Zweifel, 1956) — Dayman land frog
- Austrochaperina parkeri (Zweifel, 2000)
- Austrochaperina pluvialis (Zweifel, 1965) — Flecked land frog
- Austrochaperina polysticta (Méhely, 1901) — Morobe land frog
- Austrochaperina punctata (Van Kampen, 1913)
- Austrochaperina robusta (Fry, 1912) — Chirping land frog
- Austrochaperina rudolfarndti (Günther, 2017)
- Austrochaperina septentrionalis (Allison and Kraus, 2003)
- Austrochaperina yelaensis (Zweifel, 2000)

The AmphibiaWeb includes a few additional species that Peloso and colleagues moved to Copiula in 2016.
