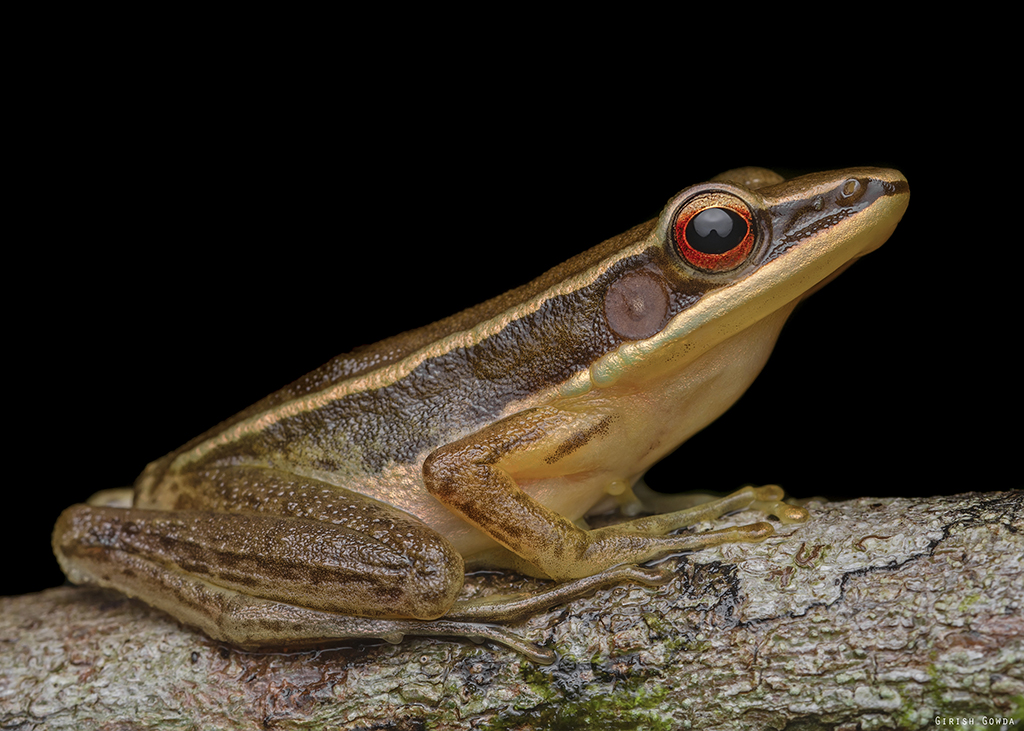

Scientific classification
- Kingdom: Animalia
- Phylum: Chordata
- Class: Amphibia
- Order: Anura
- Family: Ranidae
- Genus: Indosylvirana
- Species: I. intermedia

Binomial name
- Indosylvirana intermedia (Rao, 1937)

= Indosylvirana intermedia =

Species of ranid frog from India

Indosylvirana intermedia, or Rao's intermediate golden-backed frog, is a species of ranid frog endemic to southern India.

== Taxonomy ==
The species was originally described as Rana (Hylorana) intermedius by Rao in 1937, from a specimen discovered in Sakleshpur, Kingdom of Mysore (now in Karnataka), in the Western Ghats mountain range. Its specific epithet refers to it being intermediate between Rana gracilis (now Hydrophylax gracilis) and Rana temporalis (now Indosylvirana temporalis), both also reported in this locality.

It was later assigned to the separate genus Hylarana, although some authors kept the latter as a subgroup of Rana, while considering the species to be a synonym of R. temporalis. A 2014 study confirmed the genetic distinctiveness of the species, while showing that the presumed H. temporalis specimens of the Western Ghats were misidentified H. aurantiaca, which was recovered as the frog's closest relative. A subsequent reclassification led to most Hylarana species being moved to new genera. Notably, H. intermedia was moved to the genus Indosylvirana, which represents one of the three South Asian radiations of the Hylarana complex. Nonetheless, some publications still refer to the species as Hylarana intermedia.

== Description ==
Indosylvirana intermedia is a small frog, measuring up to 7.4 centimetres (2.9 in) in length.

== Distribution ==
Indosylvirana intermedia is found in the Western Ghats north of the Palakkad Gap, in the Indian states of Karnataka and Kerala.

== Ecology ==
One I. intermedia specimen from Karkala, Karnataka was discovered in 2023 with a living bonnet mushroom sprouting from its left flank. As the frog was not caught, precise identification of the mushroom species or of the exact nature of the relationship is unknown. Later examination of photographic evidence suggested the mushroom to be Mycena sp., a saprotrophic fungi which is mostly found in decomposing wood, although it has already been reported to grow on living tree roots. A possibility, advanced by researcher Karthikeyan Vasudevan, is that the mushroom grew from a piece of woody debris stuck under the frog's skin.

The fungal outgrowth has been noted to be unrelated to chytridiomycosis, a common fungal disease affecting frogs throughout India. Effects of the mushroom on the frog's disease sensitivity are unclear. Both the risk of a compromised immune system and the possibility of the later having been more strongly activated by the outgrowth have been proposed.
