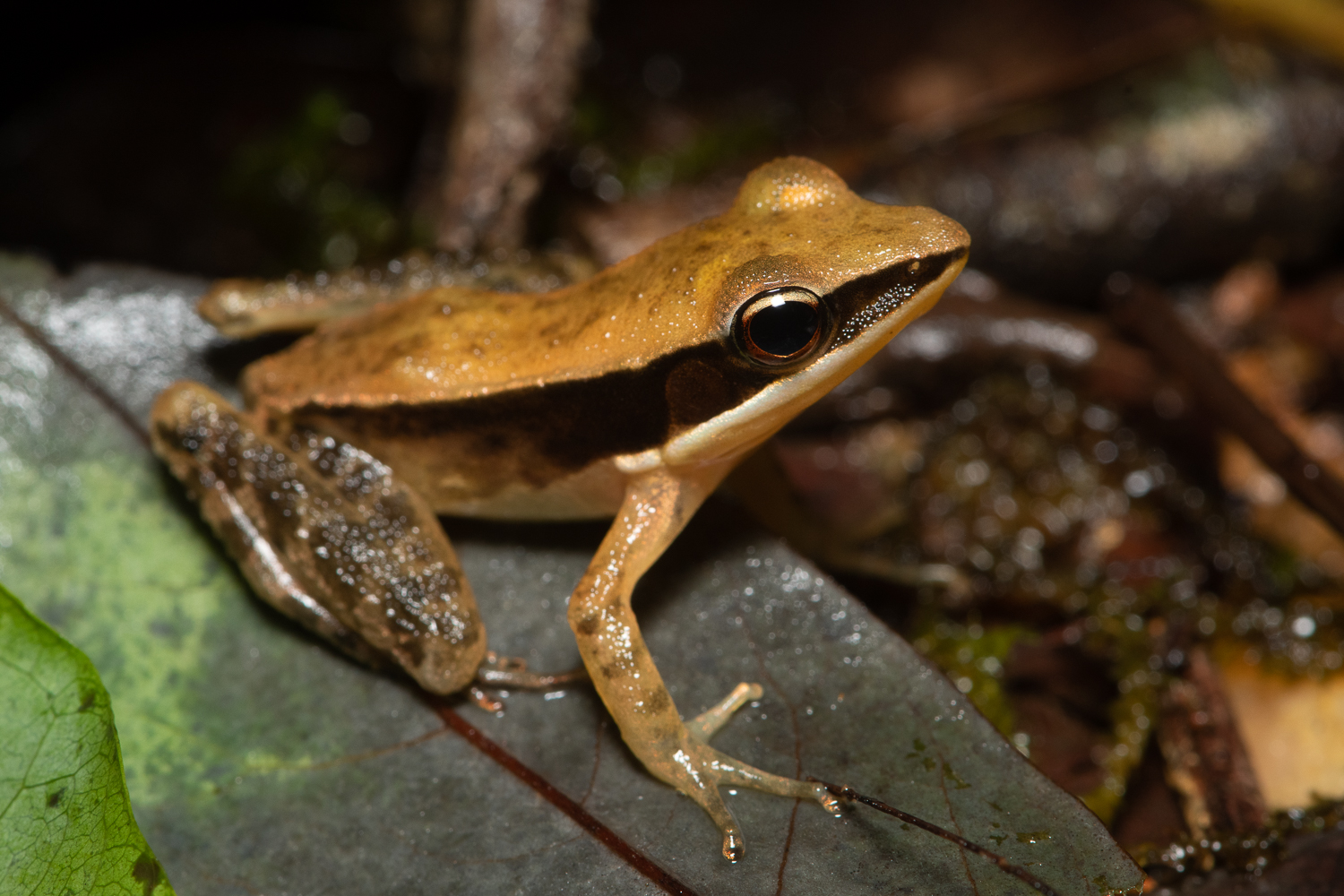

Scientific classification
- Kingdom: Animalia
- Phylum: Chordata
- Class: Amphibia
- Order: Anura
- Family: Ranidae
- Genus: Indosylvirana
- Species: I. indica

Binomial name
- Indosylvirana indica (Biju et al., 2014)

Synonyms
- Hylarana indica Biju et al., 2014

= Indosylvirana indica =

Species of frog

Indosylvirana indica, the Indian golden-backed frog, is a species of frog in the family Ranidae. It was formerly considered as conspecific with Indosylvirana temporalis but was found to be a distinct species in a 2014 study.

== Etymology ==
The species name indica came from a Latin word which refers to the origin of the species from India.

== Distribution ==
This species is endemic to the Western Ghats north of the Palghat Gap in the states of Karnataka and Kerala.

== Habitat ==
It inhabits the secondary and primary forests, also found near wetlands adjacent to forest and sometimes associated with perennial fast flowing streams. It is found at elevations between 40 and 1,145 m (131 and 3,757 ft) above sea level. As of late 2019, it has not been assessed for the IUCN Red List of Threatened Species.

== Description ==
Adult males measure 46–59 mm (1.8–2.3 in) and adult females 66–74 mm (2.6–2.9 in) in snout–vent length. The head is longer than it is wide. The snout is sub-elliptical in dorsal view and rounded in lateral view. The tympanum is distinct. The forelimbs are moderately short and thin. The fingers are long and have obtusely pointed discs at their tips. Dermal fringes are present. The hind limbs are relatively long and thin. The toe tips have obtusely pointed discs; the toes have moderate webbing. The dorsal parts are bronze while the lower flanks are light brown. The tympanic area is light greyish-brown and the tympanum is light brown. The upper lip has a yellowish-white stripe that continues to above the arm insertion. The throat, chest, and belly are greyish-white.
