= H. aurantiaca =

H. aurantiaca may refer to:

- Hylarana aurantiaca, the golden frog, a frog species endemic to Sri Lanka and the Western Ghats of India
- Hygrophoropsis aurantiaca, the false chanterelle, a mushroom species

== See also ==
- Aurantiaca
