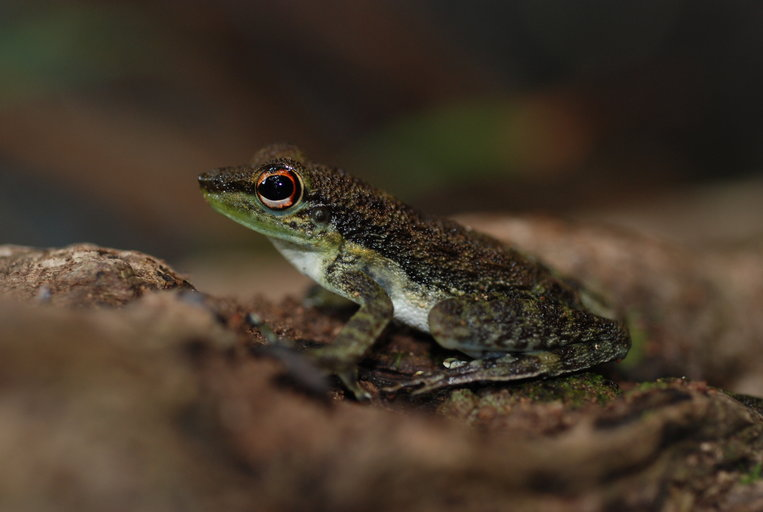

Conservation status
- Least Concern (IUCN 3.1)

Scientific classification
- Kingdom: Animalia
- Phylum: Chordata
- Class: Amphibia
- Order: Anura
- Family: Ranidae
- Genus: Staurois
- Species: S. natator

Binomial name
- Staurois natator (Günther, 1859)

= Staurois natator =

Species of frog

Staurois natator is a species of frog in the family Ranidae. It is endemic to the Philippines, where found on the islands of Mindanao, Leyte and Samar. It has sometimes been reported from other Philippine islands and Borneo, but these populations are now regarded as separate species (S. guttatus and S. nubilus). Its natural habitats are subtropical or tropical moist lowland forests, rivers, and intermittent rivers. It is threatened by habitat loss.
