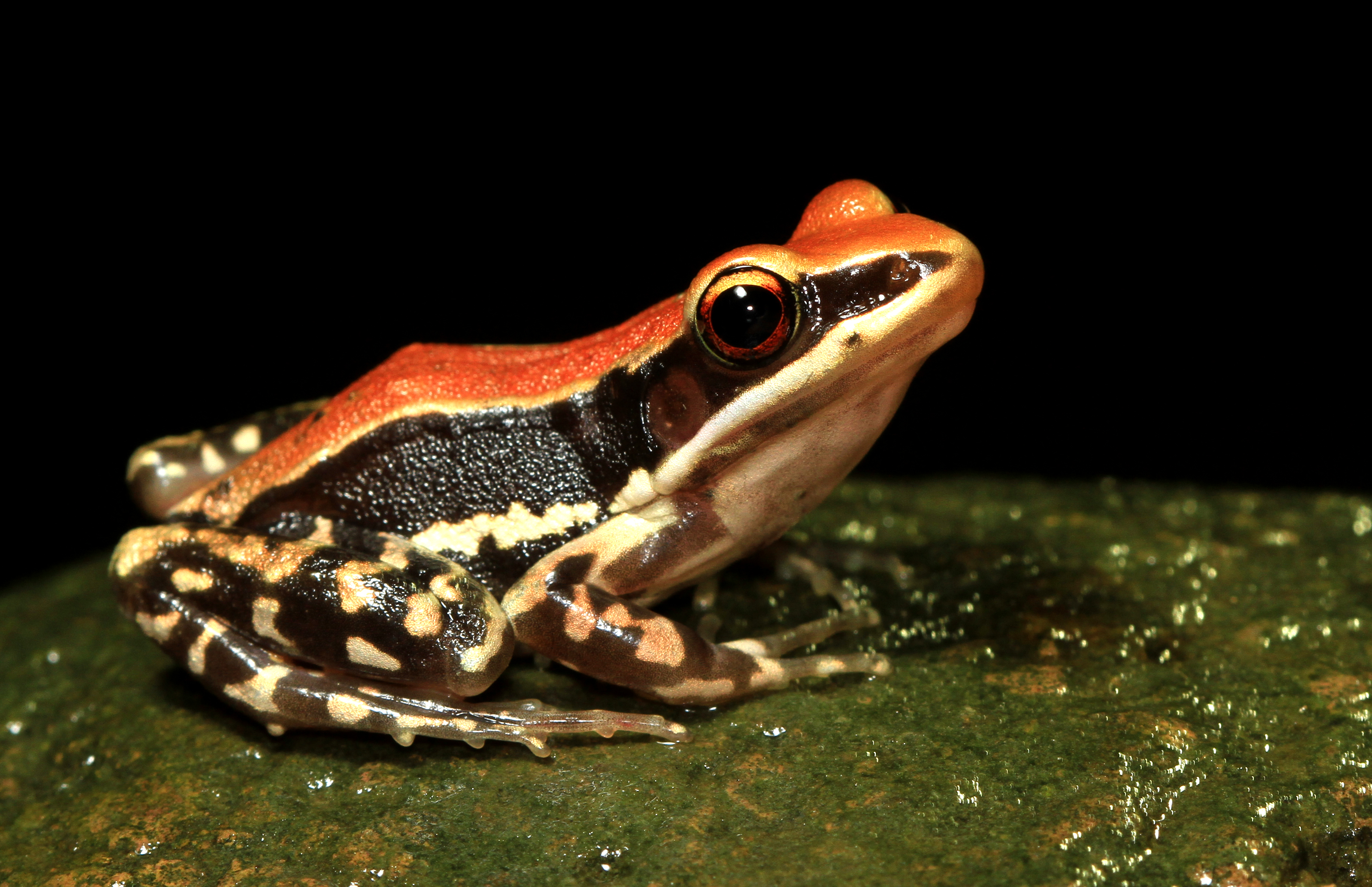

Scientific classification
- Kingdom: Animalia
- Phylum: Chordata
- Class: Amphibia
- Order: Anura
- Family: Ranidae
- Genus: Hydrophylax
- Species: H. bahuvistara

Binomial name
- Hydrophylax bahuvistara Padhye, AD, Jadhav A, Modak N, Nameer PO, Dahanukar, 2015

= Hydrophylax bahuvistara =

Species of amphibian

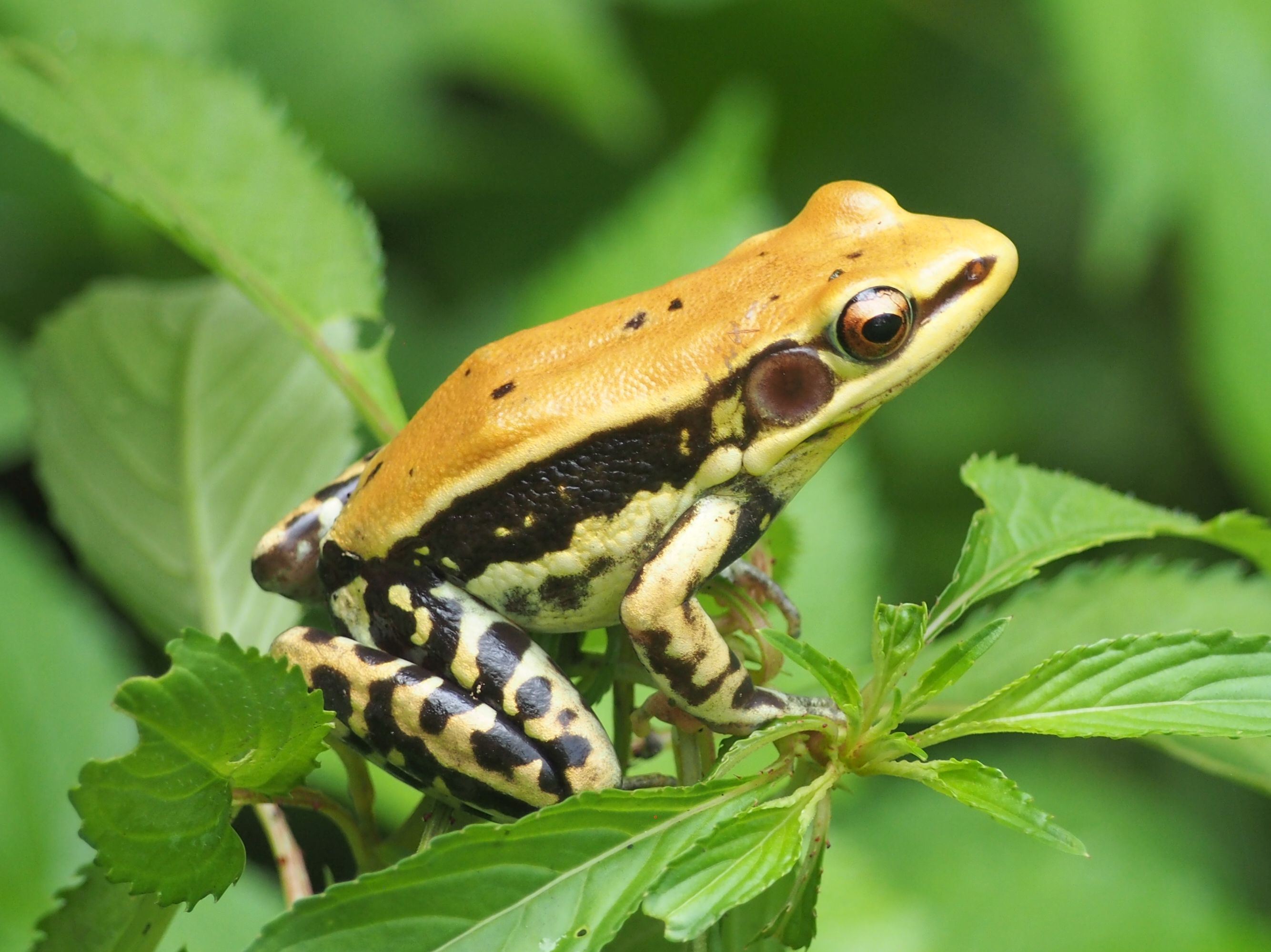
Hydrophylax bahuvistara, near Prabalgad

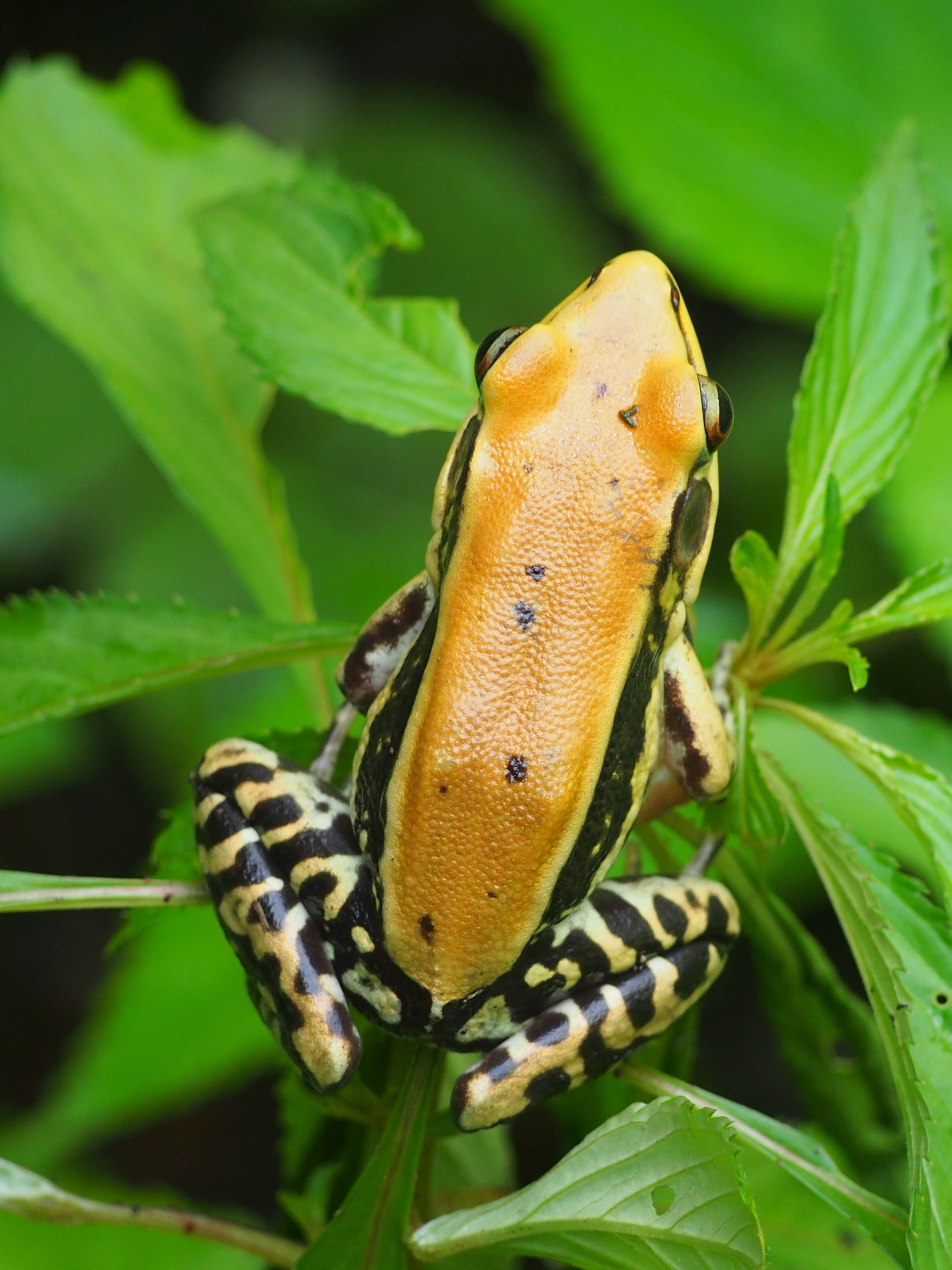
Hydrophylax bahuvistara, top view

Hydrophylax bahuvistara, commonly known as the widespread fungoid frog, is a colourful frog found widespread in peninsular India, distributed in Maharashtra, Karnataka, Goa and Madhya Pradesh. It is very similar to another species with which it overlaps partly in range, Hydrophylax malabaricus.

== Description ==
Hydrophylax bahuvistara can be separated from its congeners based on a combination of characters including outline of snout in dorsal view truncated, finger and toe tips without later-o-ventral groove, foot moderately webbed, metatarsals of 4th and 5th toes closely set, outer metatarsal tubercle small, dorsal parts of shank without glandular folds and sparse horny spinules, and heels touch each other when the legs are folded at right angles to the body.

A host defense peptide isolated from the skin of this frog, urumin, targets the stalk region of influenza virus H1 hemagglutinin protein. It destroys influenza virions, and protects mice from lethal infection; thus urumin represents a novel class of anti-influenza virucide.
