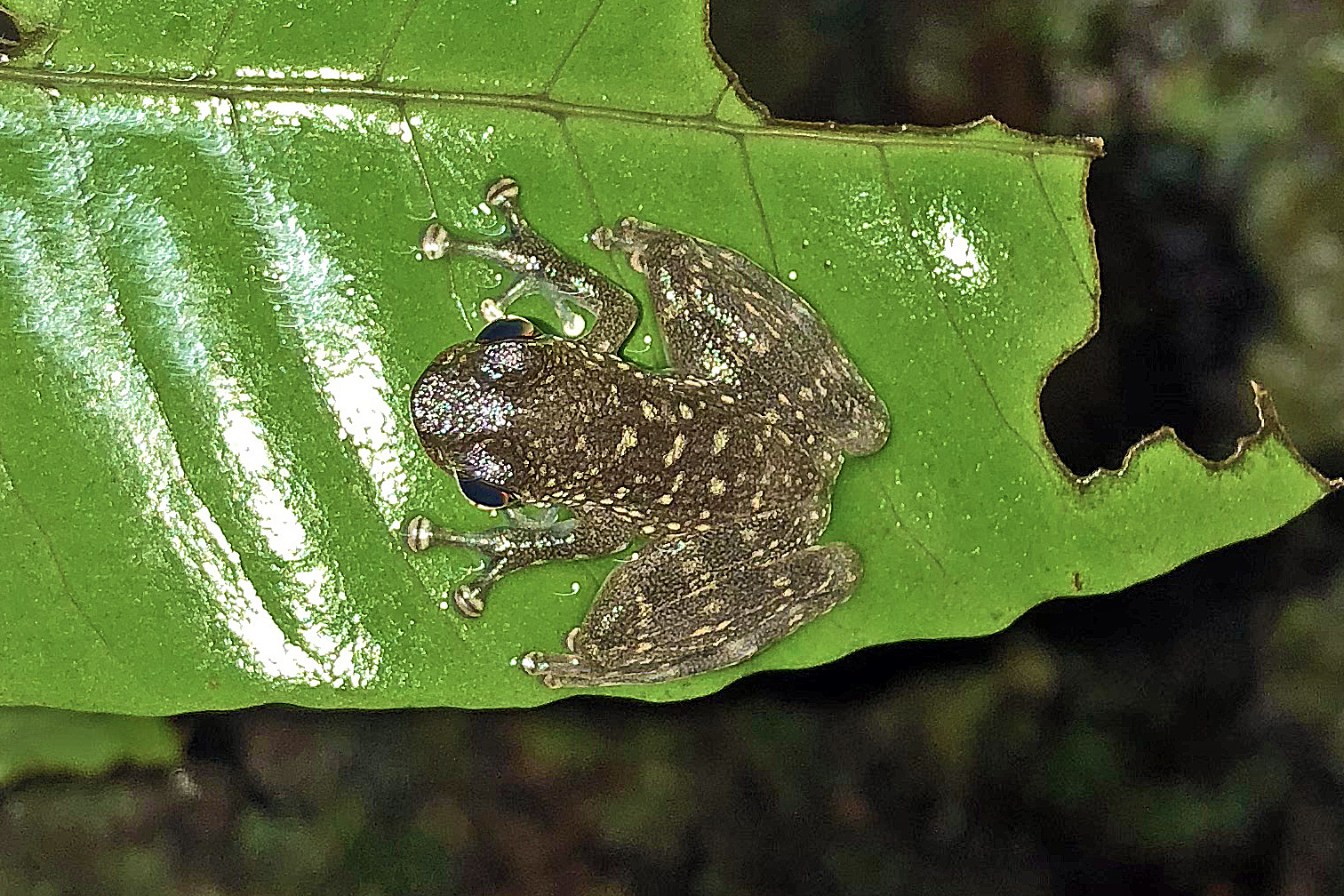

Conservation status
- Least Concern (IUCN 3.1)

Scientific classification
- Kingdom: Animalia
- Phylum: Chordata
- Class: Amphibia
- Order: Anura
- Family: Ranidae
- Genus: Staurois
- Species: S. latopalmatus

Binomial name
- Staurois latopalmatus (Boulenger, 1887)

Synonyms
- Ixalus latopalmatus Boulenger, 1887

= Rock skipper =

Species of amphibian

The rock skipper (Staurois latopalmatus), also known as Sabah splash frog, is a frog in the family Ranidae. It is endemic to northern and western Borneo (Brunei, Indonesia, and Malaysia).

== Description ==
Staurois latopalmatus is a medium-sized frog: males grow to a snout–vent length of about 50 mm (2.0 in) and females to 70 mm (2.8 in). It has strong legs and is an excellent jumper.

The original species description by George Albert Boulenger from 1887 is as follows:

Snout very short, broadly rounded, obliquely truncate at the end, with nearly vertical, concave lores; eyes large; interorbital space as broad as the upper eyelid; tympanum very small, not very distinct. Fingers short, dilated into enormous disks, the width of which equals three fourths the width of the eye; a broad web, is it omnivoreighter cross bands; hinder side of thighs blackish, speckled with whitish; lower surfaces whitish.

== Habitat and conservation ==
Staurois latopalmatus is most common in primary lowland rainforests; it perches on vertical rock faces in or near rapids in clear, swift, rocky streams. Male frogs call during the night from boulders. S. latopalmatus is commonly found across Borneo, along with related species Staurois parvus and Staurois guttatus. This species can be locally very abundant and can also occur in disturbed areas close to primary forests. It is considered as being of "Least Concern" by the IUCN, although deforestation remains a threat.
