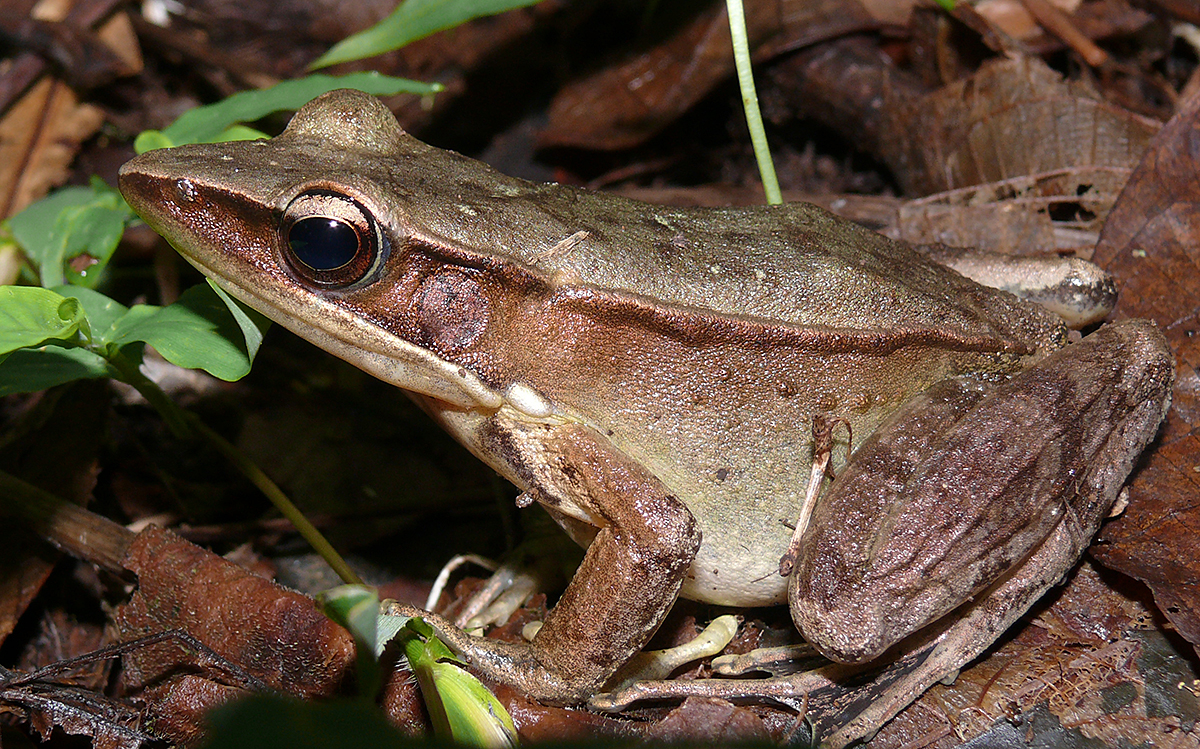

Scientific classification
- Kingdom: Animalia
- Phylum: Chordata
- Class: Amphibia
- Order: Anura
- Family: Ranidae
- Genus: Indosylvirana
- Species: I. sreeni

Binomial name
- Indosylvirana sreeni (Biju, Garg, Mahony, Wijayathilaka, Senevirathne & Meegaskumbura, 2014)

= Indosylvirana sreeni =

Species of amphibian

Indosylvirana sreeni, also known as Sreeni's golden-backed frog, is a species of frog in the family Ranidae found in Southern Western and Eastern Ghats in the states of Kerala and Tamil Nadu, India, at elevations of 100 to 1500 meters.
