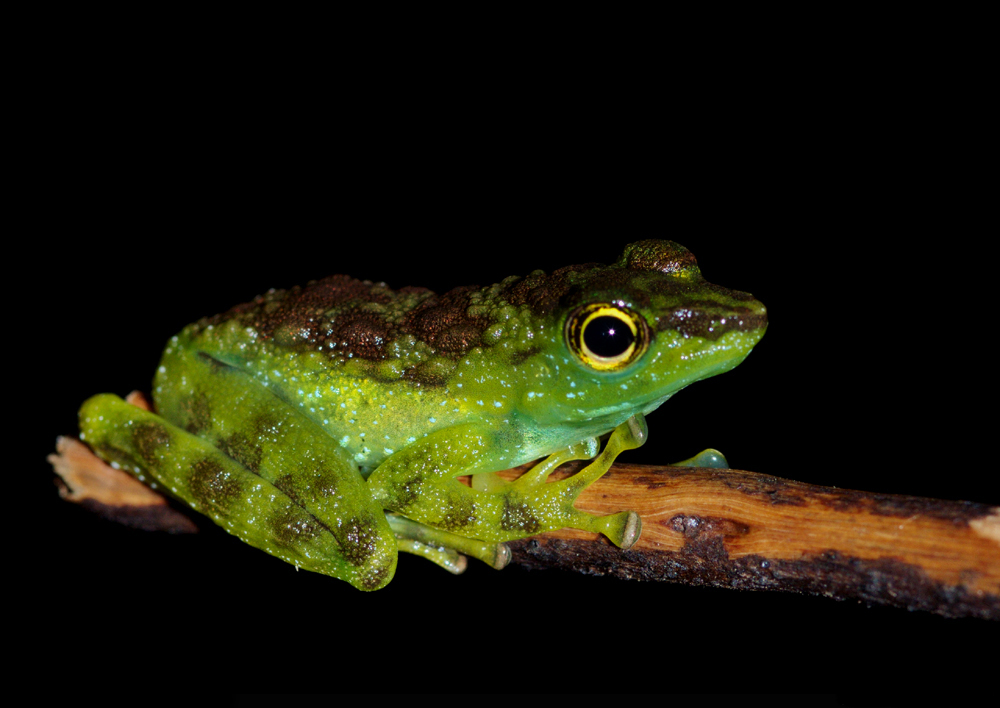
- Adult seen along stream in Mt. Kinablu National Park

Conservation status
- Least Concern (IUCN 3.1)

Scientific classification
- Kingdom: Animalia
- Phylum: Chordata
- Class: Amphibia
- Order: Anura
- Family: Ranidae
- Genus: Staurois
- Species: S. tuberilinguis

Binomial name
- Staurois tuberilinguis Boulenger, 1918

Synonyms
- Rana tuberilinguis (Boulenger, 1918)

= Staurois tuberilinguis =

Species of amphibian

Staurois tuberilinguis (common names: Borneo splash frog, green-spotted rock frog) is a semi-aquatic amphibian of the true frog family (Ranidae). This diurnal and crepuscular frog is also commonly associated with its very close relative Staurois parvus (common name: Borneo rock frog). In fact, many do not consider the two species to be taxonomically separate. This species is commonly found within the tropical rainforests of on Borneo, Malaysia next to fast-flowing rivers and streams. Due to the frog's noisy choice of habitat, S. parvus are well-known for their multi-modal system of communication that combines acoustic calls with visual display signals. S. parvus seems to be in decline in part of its range, but overall is listed as being of "least concern" in the IUCN Red List of Threatened Species. It is threatened by habitat loss, especially by deforestation and sedimentation of streams.

== Description ==
=== Tadpole morphology ===
S. parvus tadpoles possess a strongly depressed body with small subcutaneous eyes, tiny external nares, a vermiform appearance with a long tail and reduced fins, and nearly pigmentless skin. Compared to S. tuberilinguis, the two tadpoles are nearly indistinguishable; however, S. parvus contains various white isolated acini of its body and tail, while S. tuberilinguis do not.

=== Adult morphology ===
Adults of this species have a snout-vent length of 27–31 mm (1.1–1.2 in) for males and 33–38 mm (1.3–1.5 in) for females. They have a markedly slender head with a pointed snout and a rather short fourth finger, distinguishing the species from its relatives. Its vomer lacks teeth, and it has a lingual papilla. The eggs are unpigmented. Additionally, there is an array of nanopillars across the ventral surface of the frog's toes that serve as a form of reversible adhesive that allows S. parvus to ability to remain steady even under running water conditions.

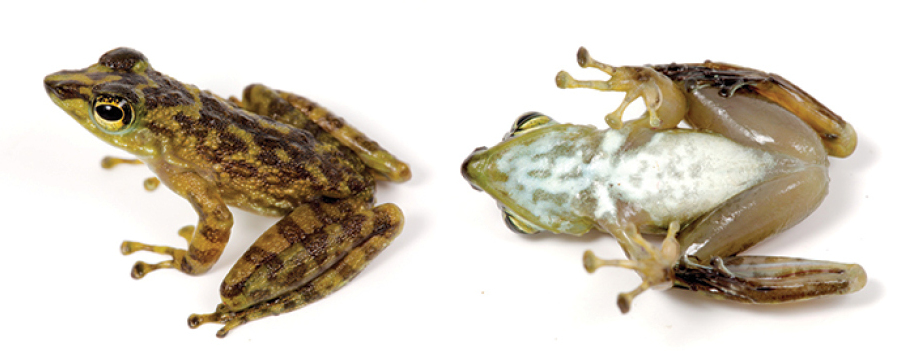
Top and bottom view of S. tuberilinguis

=== Close relatives ===
S. parvus are most closely related to S. tuberilinguis. In fact, aside from one or two morphological differences, the two species are virtually indistinguishable from each other. Genetic analysis tests have also shown that these two species are nearly the same genetic sequence. Therefore, there has been much discussion as to whether these two species are in fact taxonomically distinct. Other close relatives of S. parvus include Staurois guttatus and Staurois latopalmatus.

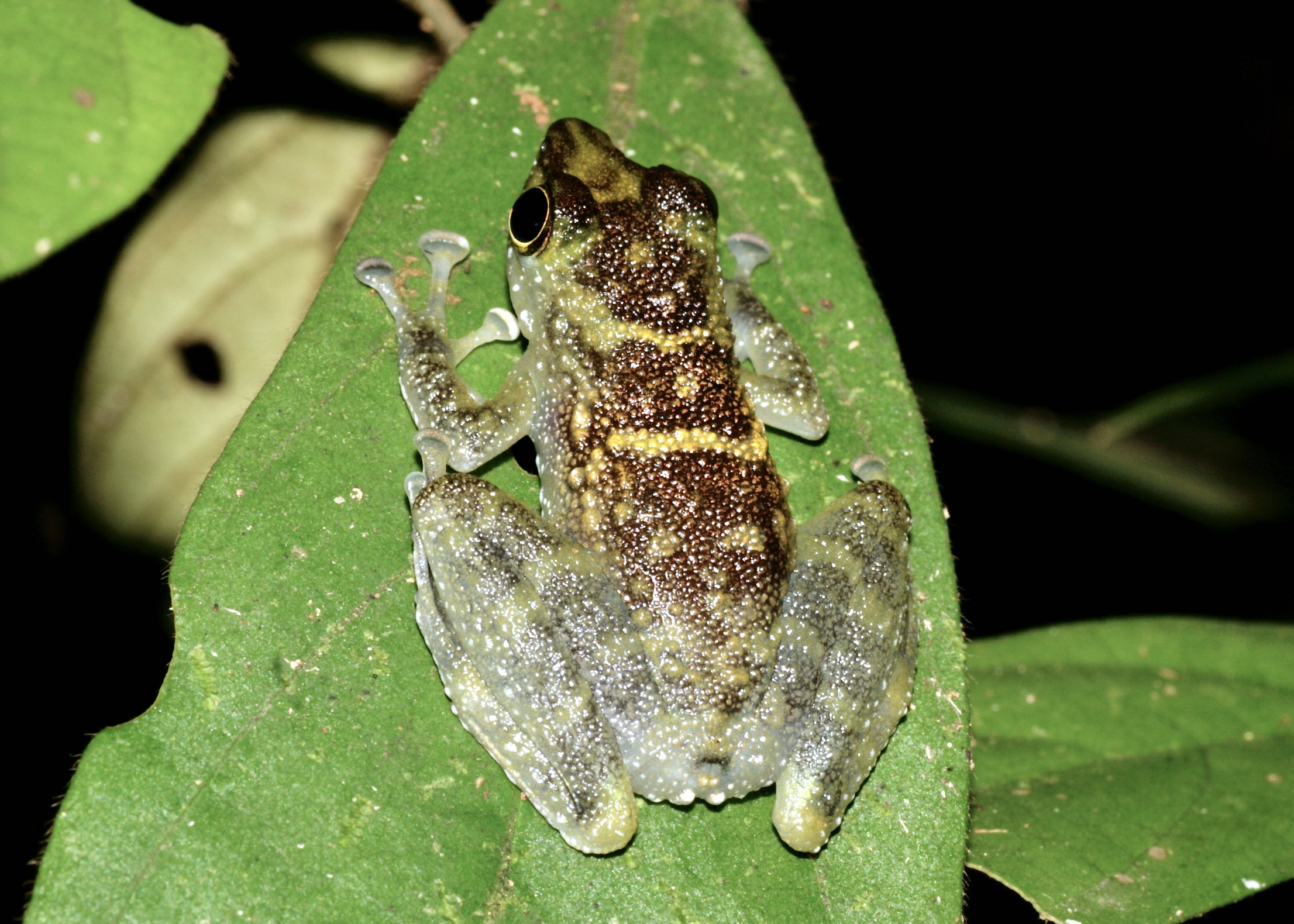
Staurois parvus

== Habitat and distribution ==
The species is found in northern Borneo in Sabah and Sarawak (Malaysia), Brunei, and northeastern Kalimantan (Indonesia) at up to 2,000 m (6,600 ft) above sea level.

A smaller relative, only known from the Crocker Range in Sabah (Malaysia), was described as S. parvus. Later, it was considered a junior synonym of S. tuberilinguis, but more recently it was confirmed to be distinct according to morphological and DNA sequence data.

This frog is commonly found along the banks of small, rocky streams with clear water in primary rainforests. They can often be seen perched on rocks or other vegetation near water, usually around the rapids. They breed in streams and the males vocalize during the day. Like other members of Staurois, they use visual signalling to attract mates.

== Life cycle ==
Ontogenetic development When S. parvus first metamorphosize from being a tadpole, they possess white and bluish coloration on their feet to assist with visual signaling. As they age from juvenile to adult this coloration increases in brightness to enhance their visual conspicuousness. Meta-analytical studies have shown that this ontogenetic change in coloration happens along with sexual development and maturity in S. parvus. In terms of bodily changes, S. parvus juveniles begin as bright green, which serve as a form of camouflage as the species is known to dwell nearly mossy rocks next to rivers and streams in rainforest environments.

== Behavior ==
=== Mating ===
Around 1–2 years after being born, S. parvus attains sexual maturity and will release a mating call. Afterwards, males settle near the side of the riverbeds and await the arrival of females. During this waiting period the riverside is significantly male-dominant, and a large amount of intrasexual competition takes place. Males puff out their vocal sac and adjust their posture to exhibit their physique and coloration in order to intimidate or deter other males that are looking to occupy their territory. The shallow portions of the river, or the areas where there is denser foliage – which are more suitable for egg laying – are predominantly occupied by the larger males.

Once the females arrive, S. parvus males will release an advertisement call to signal to the females their presence. Once the female is aware of the male's presence, the male will exhibit some form of visual signal to communicate their individual physical prowess and fitness, usually in the form of either foot flagging or foot flashing. Foot flagging involves raising a hind limb out and away from the body to expose webbing on the foot to other frogs. More mature S. parvus males will have brighter body coloration, and therefore color intensity helps females evaluate a male's age and development. Additionally, because foot flagging and flashing are physically demanding, the elaborateness and complexity of the foot display is indicative of the physical ability of the S. parvus male. Once the courtship ends, the male and female S. parvus will migrate to the water, engage in amplexus, and the female will lay her eggs. Because S. parvus females lay their eggs in fast-flowing waters, the female will choose a site under heavy leaf litter, between rocks, or within calmer side pools to prevent the eggs from getting swept away.

=== Communication ===
S. parvus individuals commonly live in noisy tropical rainforests near fast-flowing streams, which makes the usual acoustic means of communication less reliable. Therefore, S. parvus has an array of strategies used to effectively communicate in the presence of high background noise. One such strategy employed by S. parvus involves intensity amplification of their acoustic calls. If the background noise is too loud, then the Bornean rock frog is able to elevate the volume of its advertisement calls, up to 8 dB, in order to have its acoustic calls be heard by the receiver. On the other hand, S. parvus is able to modulate the pitch of its calls slightly away from its dominant calling frequency of 5578 Hz. It is hypothesized to do so in order to avoid jamming interference from the acoustic calls of conspecifics and heterospecifics. Additionally, S. parvus delivers a unique advertisement call that differentiates its call from that of similar relatives such as S. guttatus. Depending on the number of receivers and the background noise levels, S. parvus have been observed to increase the number of notes and the length of their calls. This presumedly is done to give the intended receiver more opportunity to recognize and identify the call. In extremely loud environments where vocal communication is not feasible, the Bornean rock frog is able to utilize visual modes of communication. S. parvus exhibit a large repertoire of visual communication displays, most commonly foot flagging and foot flashing. Less-common forms of visual communication by S. parvus include arm waving, upright posture, crouched posture, and an open-mouth display. Foot flagging is the act of raising either of the two hind limbs and rotating it outwards and backwards in an arc. During this behavior, which lasts on average 1.5 seconds, the frog's webbed toes are spread, allowing for the frog's conspicuous white webbing to be clearly observed by the receiver. Foot flashing is similar to foot flagging, except the hind limbs are not rotated; rather, the hind limb is stretched outwards and retracted immediately. Foot flashes are very fast, lasting about 0.83 seconds, and only occur following an acoustic call. In noisy environments like the rainforest, the purpose of the advertisement call is to direct the attention of receiver towards the signaler. Once the S. parvus has its recipient's attention, then it will follow-up with its visual display – typically a foot flag or flash. The less common visual displays – upright posture, crouching, and arm waving – are usually only displayed by S. parvus in close male-male encounters. These visual displays are typically done to communicate the male's physical ability.

Overall, S. parvus possesses a unique system of multi-modal communication that helps them to adapt and communicate in dynamic and noisy environments. This is especially the case in habitats like the tropical rainforest where rainfall is variable, and light can be scarce due to the overhead canopy. Therefore, when rainfall becomes violent and the background noise intensifies, or in low light conditions, visual modes of communication become favored. On the other hand, if there is low background noise and light conditions are appropriate, then acoustic means of communication become more advantageous. Therefore, S. parvus have developed an adaptive multi-modal communication system to overcome the dynamic conditions of their environment.

==== Physiology of Communication ====
S. parvus rely on very precise and fast muscle coordination to be able to perform visual signals like foot flagging and flashing. The mediation of such complex reflexes occurs through androgenic hormones, such as testosterone, and its related receptors. Research studies have found that neuromuscular systems that underlie multimodal communication displays in frogs and birds possess high levels of androgenic receptors and are androgen-dependent in order to function properly. Upon inhibition of these receptors, visual signals in S. parvus become inhibited, although vocal communication remains unaffected, highlighting the importance of androgenic hormones when it comes to visual communication among S. parvus.

== Diet ==
As a tadpole, S. parvus are able to only decomposed plants and algae. Once they metamorphosize, their diet expands to include insects. However, because adult S. parvus have a small body size, their diet is mostly limited to small insects such as flies, moths, and dragonflies. Overall, S. parvus are considered an opportunistic feeder, and will feed on anything that enters its domain of capture. Therefore, its diet as an adult mostly depends on the relative abundance of whatever prey during that season of the year.

== Conservation and threats ==
Deforestation by logging of forests and subsequent sedimentation and alteration of stream conditions are the primary threats to S. parvus populations. Although S. parvus is currently categorized as a species of Least Concern on the IUIC Red List, its population numbers have been steadily declining in recent years due to increased loss of habitat and habitat pollution. This species is found in Mt. Kinabalu and Gunung Mulu National Parks, which are well protected. However, the mountains in Kalimantan need urgent and increased protection.
