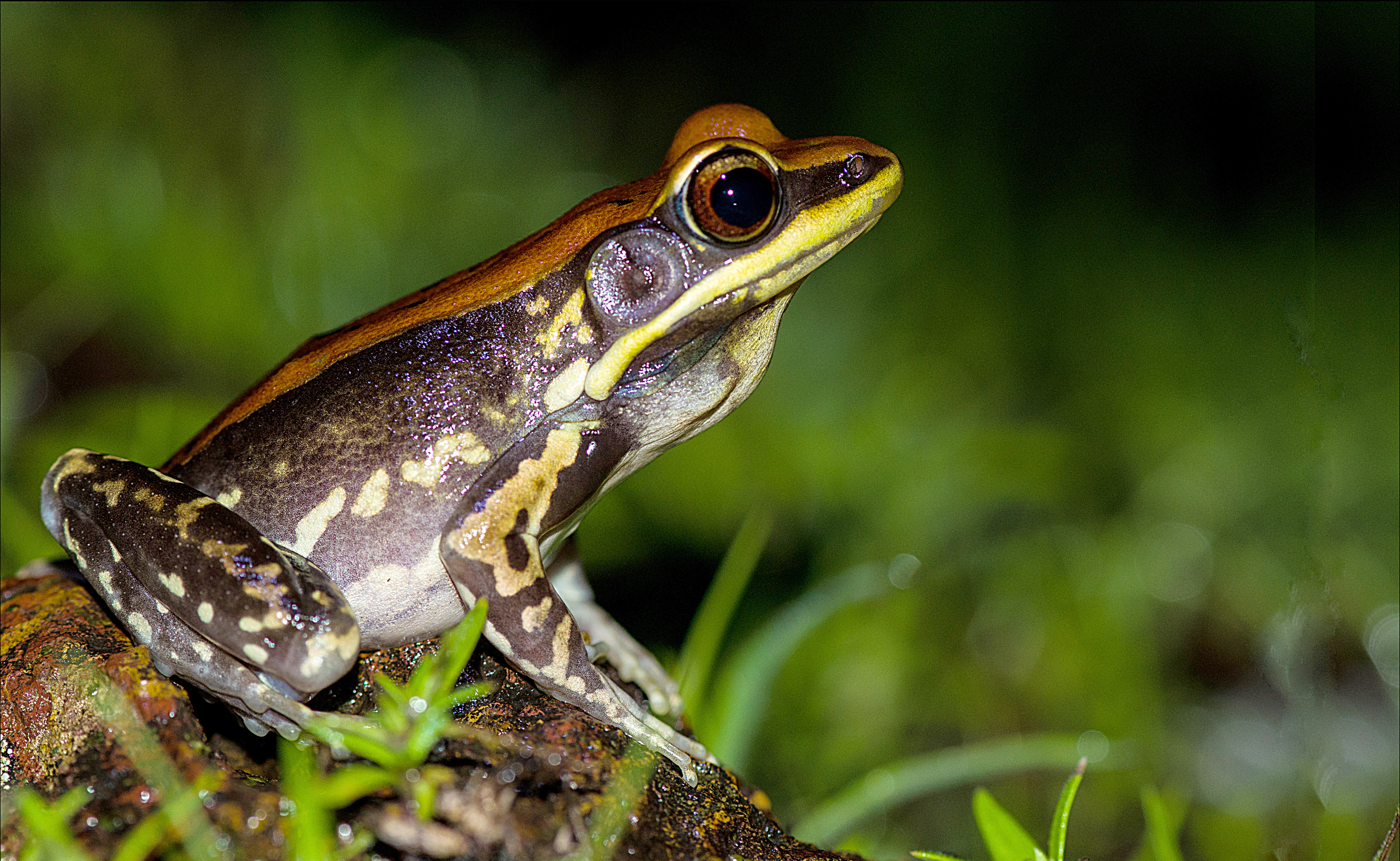

Conservation status
- Least Concern (IUCN 3.1)

Scientific classification
- Kingdom: Animalia
- Phylum: Chordata
- Class: Amphibia
- Order: Anura
- Family: Ranidae
- Genus: Hydrophylax
- Species: H. malabaricus

Binomial name
- Hydrophylax malabaricus (Tschudi, 1838)

Synonyms
- Rana malabarica Tschudi, 1838; Hylarana malabarica (Günther, 1859)

= Fungoid frog =

Species of amphibian

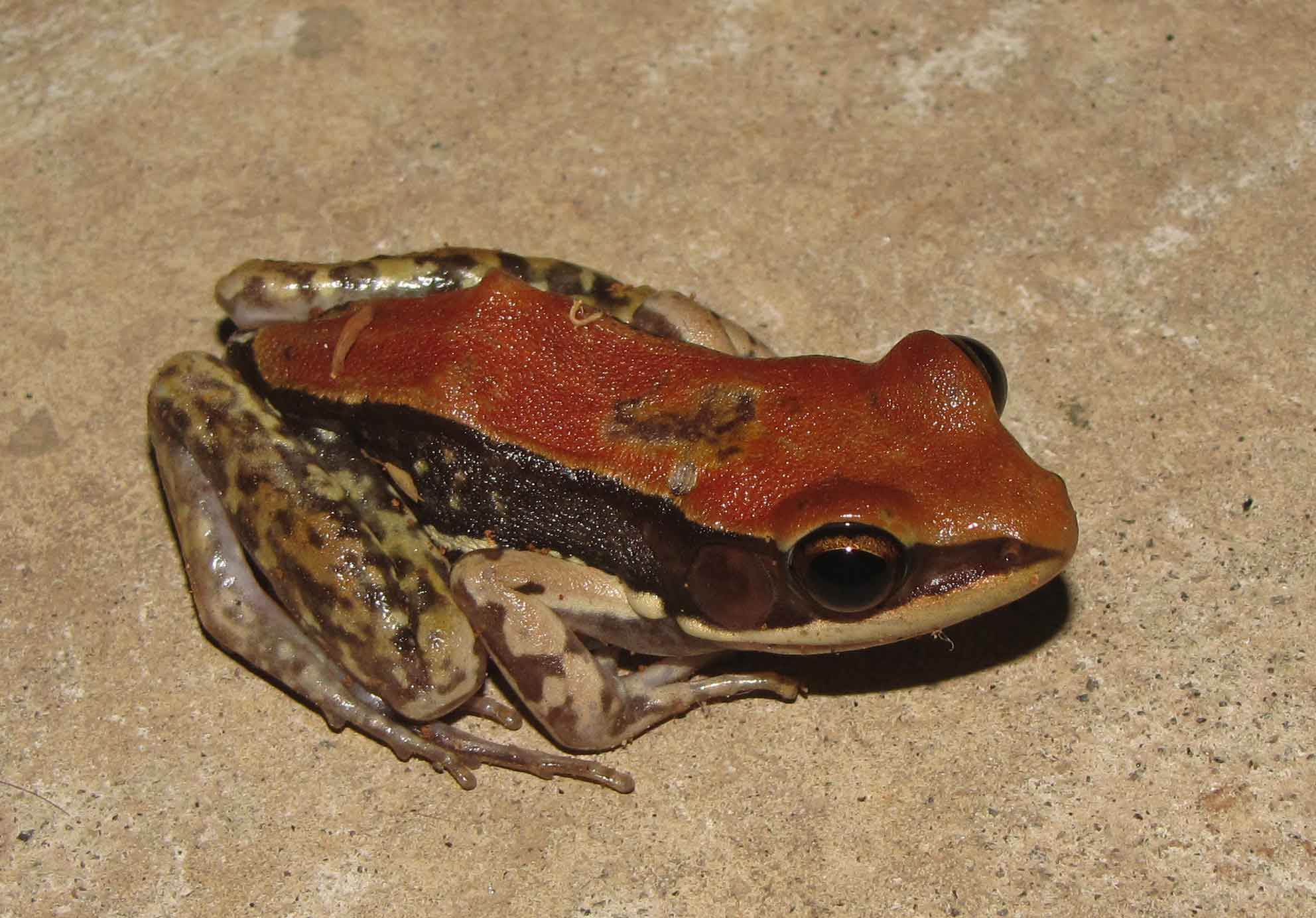
The Fungoid Frog at Ezhimala, North Malabar, Kerala

The fungoid frog or Malabar Hills frog (Hydrophylax malabaricus) is a colourful frog found on the forest floor and lower vegetation in the Western Ghats in south-western India from Bombay to Kerala. It is very similar to another species with which it overlaps partly in range, Hydrophylax bahuvistara which extends further into parts of central India. Although restricted in range within peninsular India, they are of least conservation concern. Their upper parts vary in colour from brownish-red to bright crimson.

== Description ==
Vomerine teeth in two oval oblique groups between the choanae. Head moderate, depressed; snout moderate, hardly as long as the diameter of the orbit, subacuminate, moderately prominent; loreal region concave; nostril nearer to the end of the snout than to the eye; interorbital space rather narrower than the upper eyelid; tympanum very distinct, nearly as large as the eye. fingers moderate, first extending beyond second; toes rather short, half webbed : tips of fingers and toes swollen; subarticular tubercles very strong; inner metatarsal tubercle oval, blunt; a large rounded tubercle at the base of the fourth toe; no tarsal fold. The tibio-tarsal articulation reaches the tympanum or the eye. Skin finely granulate above; a broad, not very prominent glandular lateral fold; a strong glandular fold from below the eye to the shoulder, followed by one or two glandules. Head and body bright crimson above, blackish brown on the sides; back sometimes with a few small black spots; upper lip, and a series of spots on the flank, white; limbs blackish brown above, spotted and marbled with pale brown and while; beneath uniform white, or marbled brown and white.
