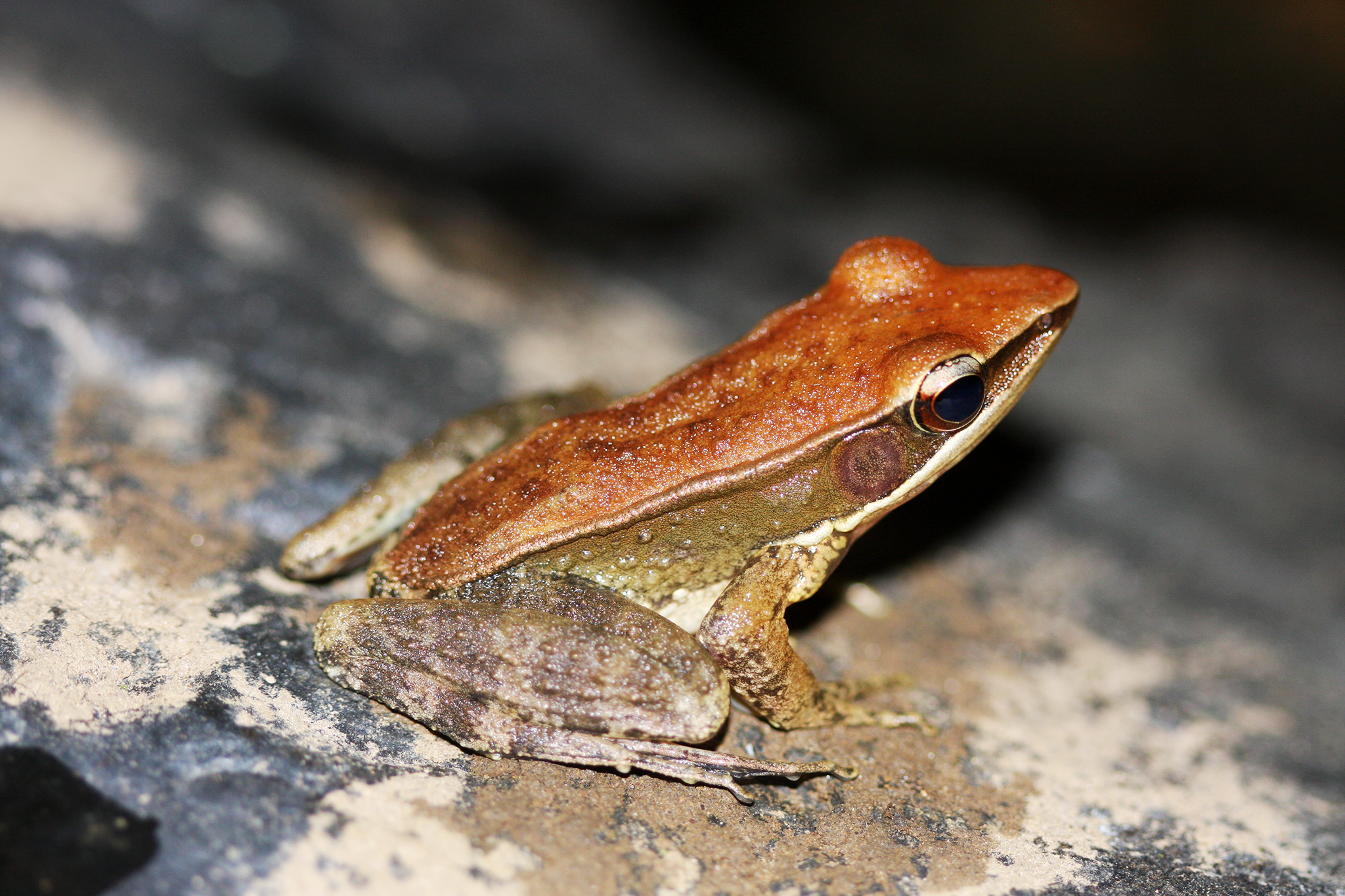

Conservation status
- Near Threatened (IUCN 3.1)

Scientific classification
- Kingdom: Animalia
- Phylum: Chordata
- Class: Amphibia
- Order: Anura
- Family: Ranidae
- Genus: Indosylvirana
- Species: I. temporalis

Binomial name
- Indosylvirana temporalis (Günther, 1864)

Synonyms
- Rana temporalis Günther, 1864; Sylvirana temporalis (Günther, 1864)

= Indosylvirana temporalis =

Bronzed frog

Species of amphibian

Indosylvirana temporalis, commonly known as the bronzed frog or Günther's golden-backed frog, is a species of true frog found in the riparian evergreen forests of the highlands of southwestern Sri Lanka. They are found abundantly on or close to the ground near water. Individuals are not shy and react by jumping only when provoked. They are important prey of many species of snakes, including the vine snake. Some related species found in the Western Ghats of India were formerly included in this species but were separated in a 2014 study.

== Description ==
Its vomerine teeth are present in two oblique series that extend beyond the level of the hind edge of the choanae. Its head is depressed and triangular; the snout is subacuminate and prominent. The canthus rostralis is angular and the loreal region is nearly vertical and strongly concave. The interorbital space is as broad as the upper eyelid or rather broader in some cases. The tympanum is very distinct and is as large as the eye, but sometimes a little smaller.

The digits are moderate wherein the first extends beyond the second. The toes are almost entirely webbed. The tips of the fingers and toes are dilated into well-developed disks. Its subarticular tubercles are well developed, while the inner metatarsal tubercle is oval and blunt with a small, round, outer metatarsal tubercle and no tarsal fold. The tibiotarsal articulation reaches from the nostril to the tip of the snout and sometimes a little beyond it.

The skin of these frogs is smooth or finely granulate above, with a narrow glandular lateral fold. While the dorsal regions are brown coloured, the loreal and temporal regions, and sometimes also the sides of the body are dark brown in colour. A white labial band can also be seen. Its limbs have dark cross bands. The ventral parts are typically white, with the throat and breast more or less speckled with brown spots. Males have internal vocal sacs and oval flat glands on the inner side of their arms. Males also have a strong pad on the inner side of the first finger, covered during the breeding season with a greyish brown velvet-like horny layer.

== Etymology ==
The frogs' common name is derived from the small bronze-coloured strips that appear on either side of the lower jaw, between the snout and the posterior point of the forelimbs, within a week after metamorphosis. The species has been referred to by several names, including Hylarana malabarica (incorrectly), Rana flavascens, Rana malabarica, Hylorana malabarica, Hylorana temporalis, Hylorana flavescens, Rana temporalis, Sylvirana temporalis, and Hylarana temporalis.

== Distribution and habitat ==
The bronzed frog is found only in Sri Lanka. They are chiefly found on the edges of rocky streams at low altitudes. They sit exposed on flat rocks and stones, and leap, often to a considerable distance, into the water when disturbed.

== Breeding ==
The bronzed frog typically breeds along the edges of gently flowing and/or in pockets of still water along the streams. The muddy colour of the tadpoles matches well with the substratum of the stream. The oral armature is well-suited for grazing at the bottom. In near permanent water, the tadpoles may have longer metamorphic duration (3–4 mo) to enable body growth and emergence of larger/stronger froglets.

Breeding season begins from August to May, and males will begin their mating call from 9:00 to 11:00 PM. Eggs are slightly green in color and can be found in clutches of 800 to 1200. These are usually deposited at the edges of rocky pools.

== Growth and development ==
The tadpoles of bronzed frogs appear in the streams from October till March. They are at least 11–14 mm (0.43–0.55 in) long at metamorphosis and weigh about 0.10–0.17 g (0.0035–0.0060 oz). The larval duration varies from 90 to 120 days. The dorsal sides of the tadpoles bear a muddy green/white/yellowish or olive brown colour, while their lateral sides are usually muddy. They have triangular snouts with a single, sinistral and lateral spiracle. The tail fin is transparent and pointed with moderately developed musculature. Slight pigmentation is visible on the skin of tail muscles and tail fins. The height of the dorsal fin is greater than the ventral fin. The teeth are blunt with the dental formula 2.23.1. A characteristic yellowish-brown strip is formed on the dorsal side between the snout and the posterior tip. On the lateral side, a black strip runs from the anterior to the posterior side of the body. Within a week of metamorphosis, small bronzed-coloured strips appear on either sides of the lower jaw, between the snout and the posterior point of the fore limbs. The bronzed strips are interrupted below the fore limbs.

=== Effects of density and kinship on growth and metamorphosis ===
Density can significantly influence growth and metamorphosis in many species of anurans, such as the Indian bull frog (Rana tigrina) and the toad Bufo melanostictus, including the bronzed frog. Generally, growth rates, measured in terms of body mass, vary inversely with population density, and slowly growing individuals metamorphose at smaller sizes than their larger conspecifics. Growth and size at metamorphic climax were therefore inversely correlated with density of rearing.

Presence of kin and non-kin also affects larval growth and metamorphosis. Larval growth was significantly greater when reared with siblings (crowded or uncrowded) compared to those reared with non-kin. Also, variation in size was also lower in individuals reared in pure groups compared to those reared in mixed groups. In mixed groups, the spectrum of developmental stages were broader than for pure groups.

== Behaviour ==
=== Microhabitat choice ===
Following the south-west monsoon rains that lash the Indian west coast from the first week of June, innumerable anuran species breed in ephemeral ponds and puddles. This incidentally puts the individuals in severe intra- and interspecific competition for food and space, and also to predation pressures. Microhabitat selection is, therefore, an important strategy employed by the anuran species including the bronzed frog. Tadpoles of bronzed frogs, which possess ventral mouths, predominantly occupy the substrate zone, and in greater numbers at the night than in daytime.

=== Social aggregation ===
Tadpoles of bronzed frogs show a social aggregation phenomenon. However, the nature and significance of this behaviour is yet to be understood.

=== Kin recognition ===
Kin recognition is widespread in organisms as diverse as social insects, fishes, amphibians, birds, and mammals, and even plants. Kin recognition behaviour in bronzed frog seems to be associated with growth regulation as their growth and metamorphosis is enhanced when reared with siblings than with nonsiblings.

=== Foraging strategy ===
Ideal free distribution (IFD) refers to the idea that individuals of a species will distribute themselves amongst areas or patches in such a way that the average gain to all individuals is equal. Tadpoles of bronzed frog exhibit IFD behaviour while foraging, regardless of whether they are siblings or nonsiblings in a group, which correlates well with their group-living strategy in nature.

=== Food perception ===
Tadpoles of bronzed frogs detect food based on chemical cues and not visually, indicating that chemical perception predominates visual senses in I. temporalis tadpoles.

== See also ==
- Indosylvirana aurantiaca, the golden frog
- Hylarana malabarica, the fungoid frog
