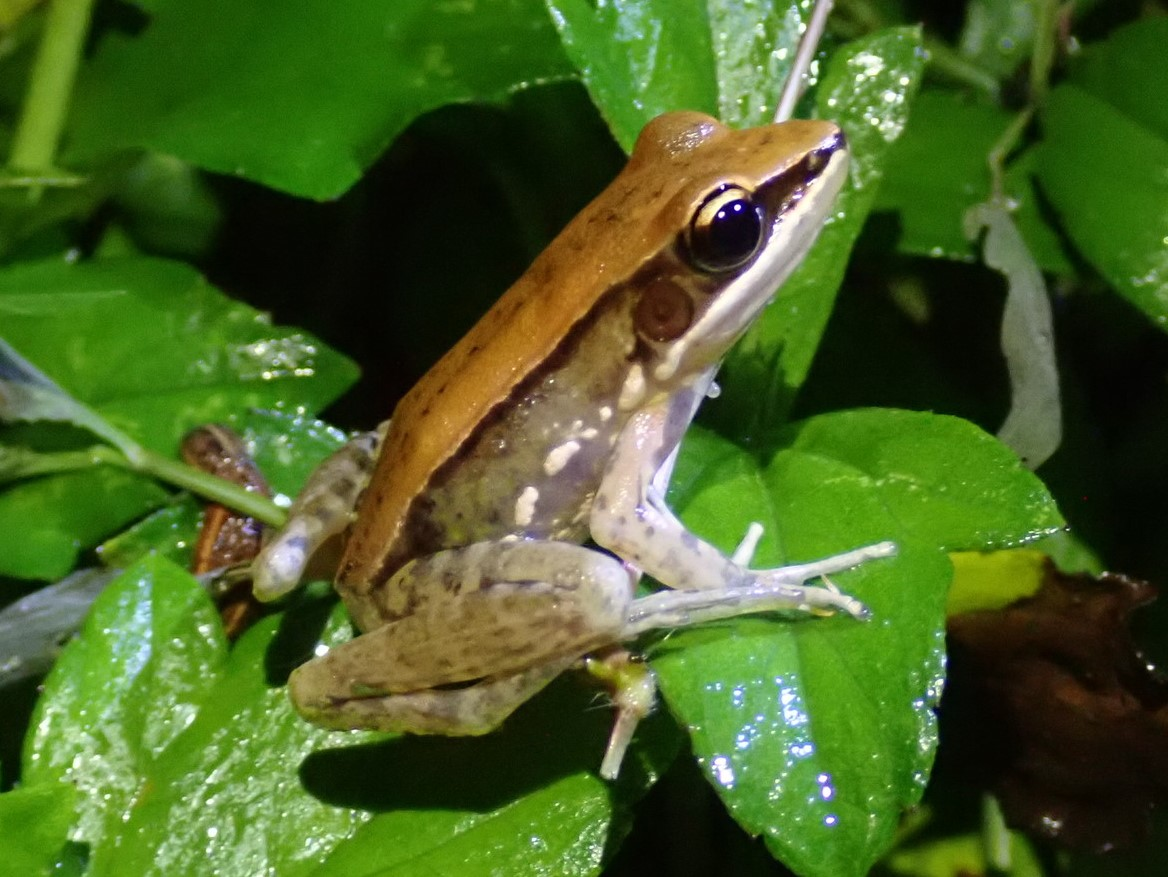

Conservation status
- Least Concern (IUCN 3.1)

Scientific classification
- Kingdom: Animalia
- Phylum: Chordata
- Class: Amphibia
- Order: Anura
- Family: Ranidae
- Genus: Hydrophylax
- Species: H. gracilis

Binomial name
- Hydrophylax gracilis (Gravenhorst, 1829)

Synonyms
- Rana gracilis Gravenhorst, 1829; Limnodytes macularius Blyth, 1855 "1854"; Hylorana macularia — Günther, 1864; Rana macularia — Boulenger, 1882; Hylarana gracilis — Chen et al., 2005; Sylvirana gracilis — Frost et al., 2006

= Hydrophylax gracilis =

Species of amphibian

Hydrophylax gracilis, also known as Gravenhorst's frog, Gravenhorst's golden-backed frog, and Sri Lanka wood frog, is a species of frog in the family Ranidae. It is endemic to Sri Lanka.

Hydrophylax gracilis occurs in marshes, agricultural land, grassland, and bush forests at elevations below 600 m (2,000 ft). Adult frogs are semi-arboreal and semi-aquatic, whereas the tadpoles live in stagnant waters. H. gracilis is a common species that can be threatened by loss of its wetland habitats through wetland reclamation, urbanization, and aquatic agrochemical pollution. However, it is present in many protected areas.
