= Hylarana montivaga =

Conservation status
- Endangered (IUCN 3.1)

Scientific classification
- Kingdom: Animalia
- Phylum: Chordata
- Class: Amphibia
- Order: Anura
- Family: Ranidae
- Genus: Hylarana
- Species: H. montivaga

Binomial name
- Hylarana montivaga (Smith, 1921)

Synonyms
- Rana montivaga Smith, 1921; Sylvirana montivaga (Smith, 1921); Bamburana montivaga (Smith, 1921); Hylarana montivaga (Smith, 1921)

Species of frog

Hylarana montivaga, sometimes known as Langbian Plateau frog or Chantaburi stream frog, is a species of frog in the family Ranidae. Its generic placement is currently unsettled. It is known from the Langbian Plateau in southern-central Vietnam; records from elsewhere (including Thailand) refer to other species.

== Habitat and conservation ==
This species is known from streams in evergreen forests at elevations of 1,500–2,000 m (4,900–6,600 ft) above sea level. It is currently listed as "endangered" by the International Union for Conservation of Nature (ICUN). This is due to agriculture and aquaculture within their habitats, and biological resource use.
