= Urumin =

Names
- Other names IPLRGAFINGRWDSQCHRFSNGAIACA; H-Ile-Pro-Leu-Arg-Gly-Ala-Phe-Ile-Asn-Gly-Arg-Trp-Asp-Ser-Gln-Cys-His-Arg-Phe-Ser-Asn-Gly-Ala-Ile-Ala-Cys-Ala-OH

Identifiers
3D model (JSmol)	Interactive image
PubChem CID	163325317
- InChI: InChI=1S/C129H198N42O35S2/c1-13-63(6)100(133)125(204)171-43-27-37-92(171)122(201)163-80(44-62(4)5)112(191)154-76(34-24-40-141-127(134)135)106(185)145-54-96(177)149-66(9)103(182)157-82(46-71-30-20-17-21-31-71)117(196)170-102(65(8)15-3)124(203)164-86(50-95(132)176)108(187)147-56-98(179)153-77(35-25-41-142-128(136)137)109(188)159-83(47-72-52-144-75-33-23-22-32-74(72)75)114(193)162-87(51-99(180)181)116(195)166-88(57-172)118(197)156-79(38-39-93(130)174)111(190)168-91(60-208)121(200)160-84(48-73-53-140-61-148-73)115(194)155-78(36-26-42-143-129(138)139)110(189)158-81(45-70-28-18-16-19-29-70)113(192)165-89(58-173)119(198)161-85(49-94(131)175)107(186)146-55-97(178)150-67(10)105(184)169-101(64(7)14-2)123(202)151-68(11)104(183)167-90(59-207)120(199)152-69(12)126(205)206/h16-23,28-33,52-53,61-69,76-92,100-102,144,172-173,207-208H,13-15,24-27,34-51,54-60,133H2,1-12H3,(H2,130,174)(H2,131,175)(H2,132,176)(H,140,148)(H,145,185)(H,146,186)(H,147,187)(H,149,177)(H,150,178)(H,151,202)(H,152,199)(H,153,179)(H,154,191)(H,155,194)(H,156,197)(H,157,182)(H,158,189)(H,159,188)(H,160,200)(H,161,198)(H,162,193)(H,163,201)(H,164,203)(H,165,192)(H,166,195)(H,167,183)(H,168,190)(H,169,184)(H,170,196)(H,180,181)(H,205,206)(H4,134,135,141)(H4,136,137,142)(H4,138,139,143)/t63-,64-,65-,66-,67-,68-,69-,76-,77-,78-,79-,80-,81-,82-,83-,84-,85-,86-,87-,88-,89-,90-,91-,92-,100-,101-,102-/m0/s1 Key: QLPKBNCTTOVOBP-QZGABZBFSA-N
- SMILES: N[C@@]([H])([C@]([H])(CC)C)C(=O)N1[C@@]([H])(CCC1)C(=O)N[C@@]([H])(CC(C)C)C(=O)N[C@@]([H])(CCCNC(=N)N)C(=O)NCC(=O)N[C@@]([H])(C)C(=O)N[C@@]([H])(Cc1ccccc1)C(=O)N[C@@]([H])([C@]([H])(CC)C)C(=O)N[C@@]([H])(CC(=O)N)C(=O)NCC(=O)N[C@@]([H])(CCCNC(=N)N)C(=O)N[C@@]([H])(CC(=CN2)C1=C2C=CC=C1)C(=O)N[C@@]([H])(CC(=O)O)C(=O)N[C@@]([H])(CO)C(=O)N[C@@]([H])(CCC(=O)N)C(=O)N[C@@]([H])(CS)C(=O)N[C@@]([H])(CC1=CN=C-N1)C(=O)N[C@@]([H])(CCCNC(=N)N)C(=O)N[C@@]([H])(Cc1ccccc1)C(=O)N[C@@]([H])(CO)C(=O)N[C@@]([H])(CC(=O)N)C(=O)NCC(=O)N[C@@]([H])(C)C(=O)N[C@@]([H])([C@]([H])(CC)C)C(=O)N[C@@]([H])(C)C(=O)N[C@@]([H])(CS)C(=O)N[C@@]([H])(C)C(=O)O

Properties
Chemical formula	C_{129}H_{198}N_{42}O_{35}S_{2}
Molar mass	2961.38 g·mol^{−1}
- Except where otherwise noted, data are given for materials in their standard state (at 25 °C [77 °F], 100 kPa). Infobox references

Urumin is a naturally occurring 27-amino acid virucidal host defense peptide against the human influenza A virus. It was discovered and isolated from the skin of Hydrophylax bahuvistara, a species of frog found in South India, by a team of Emory University researchers. The team that discovered urumin tested the peptide against 8 different H1N1 and 4 different H3N2 viruses, as well as various other influenza viruses. The peptide specifically targets the evolutionarily conserved H1 hemagglutinin stalk region of H1-containing influenza A viruses. Additionally, urumin was active against drug-resistant influenza A viruses, that were resistant against oseltamivir, zanamivir, and peramivir.

While its mechanism of action is not fully understood, urumin seems to inhibit viral growth by physically destroying influenza A virions, and is able to protect naive mice from doses of influenza A infection as high as twice the LD_{50}. Because of its specific targeting of the hemagglutinin stalk region of the influenza A virus, the mechanism of action of urumin is similar to that of antibodies induced in the body by universal influenza vaccines. Urumin was also tested for toxicity against erythrocytes and showed a TD_{50} of 2,450 μM and TI of 664.7, indicating a favorable toxicity profile against erythrocytes. As such, urumin may represent the basis for a potential first-line antiviral treatment against influenza A, particularly in the context of influenza outbreaks, although the discoverers of the peptide have stated that urumin is far from becoming an anti-flu drug. Urumin was named after the urumi, a sword used in Kalaripayattu, the martial art of Kerala, where urumin was discovered.
