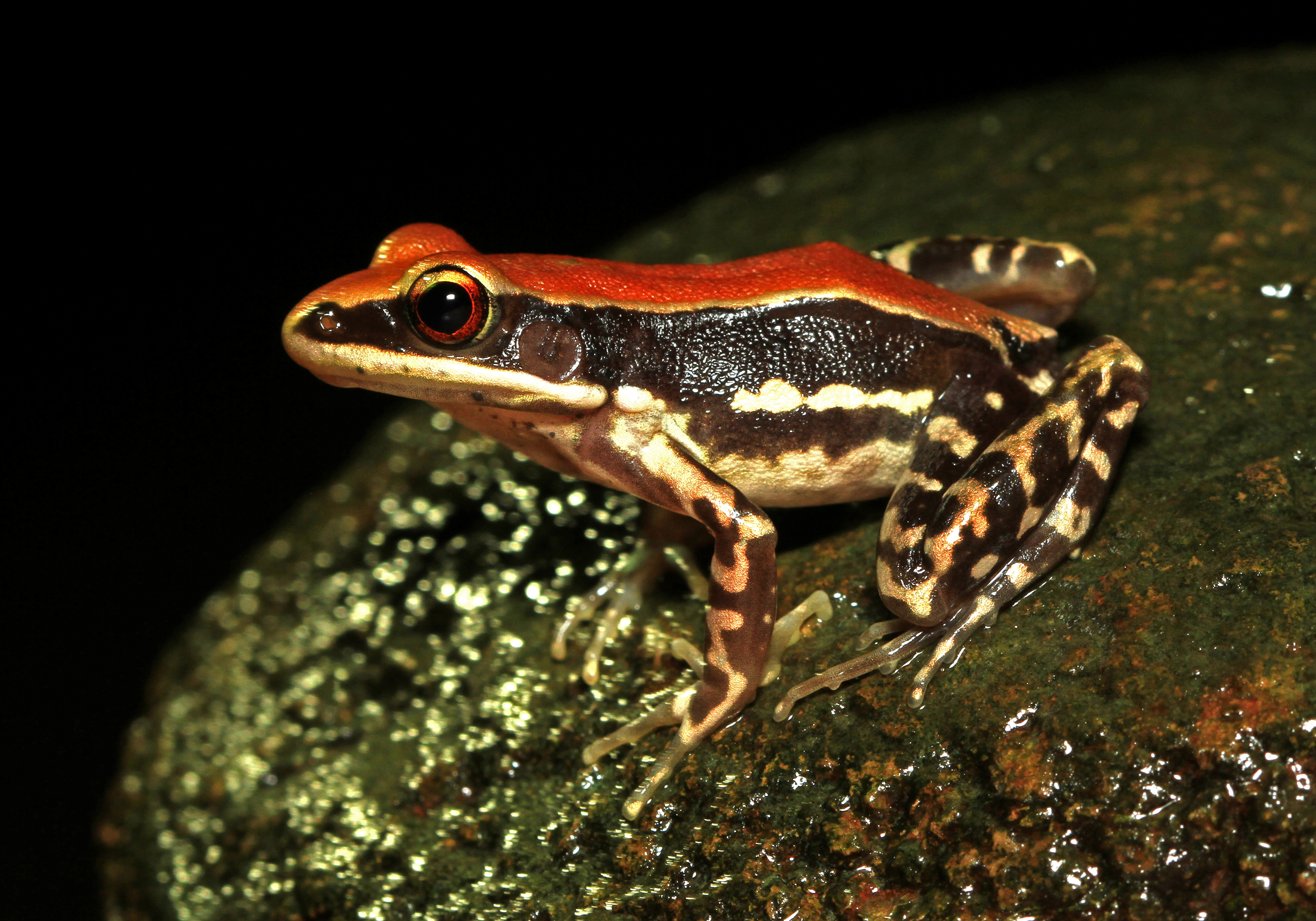
- Hydrophylax bahuvistara

Scientific classification
- Kingdom: Animalia
- Phylum: Chordata
- Class: Amphibia
- Order: Anura
- Family: Ranidae
- Genus: Hydrophylax; Fitzinger, 1843

Type species
- Rana malabarica Tschudi, 1838

Species
- 4 species (see text)

= Hydrophylax (frog) =

Genus of amphibians

Hydrophylax is a genus of true frogs (family Ranidae). They are found in South and Southeast Asia.

== Species ==
The following species are recognised in the genus Hydrophylax:

- Hydrophylax bahuvistara Padhye et al., 2015
- Hydrophylax gracilis (Gravenhorst, 1829)
- Hydrophylax leptoglossa (Cope, 1868)
- Hydrophylax malabaricus (Tschudi, 1838)
