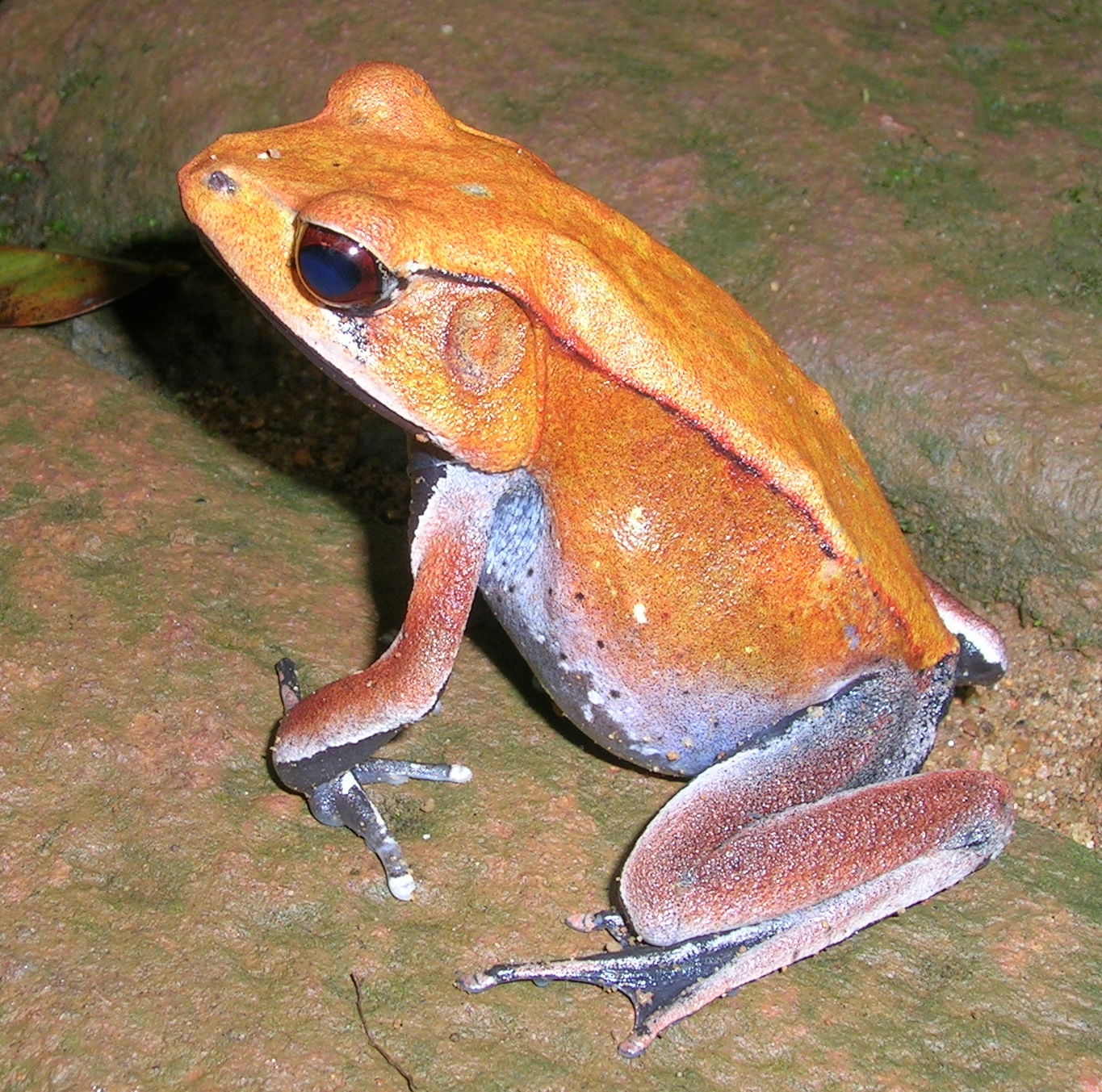
- Breeding male Clinotarsus curtipes

Scientific classification
- Kingdom: Animalia
- Phylum: Chordata
- Class: Amphibia
- Order: Anura
- Family: Ranidae
- Genus: Clinotarsus (Mivart, 1869)

Species
- see text.

Synonyms
- Pachybatrachus Mivart, 1869 (preoccupied); Nasirana Dubois, 1992

= Clinotarsus =

Genus of amphibians

Clinotarsus is a genus of ranid frogs. Members of this genus are found in India and Southeast Asia.

== Species ==
There are three species recognised in the genus Clinotarsus:

Image	Name	Common name	Distribution
	Clinotarsus alticola (Boulenger, 1882)	Assam Hills frog, Annandale's frog, pointed-headed frog, palebrown stream frog, hill frog, point-nosed frog, and high-altitude frog	Meghalaya and northeastern India (Assam, Meghalaya, Mizoram, Nagaland, Tripura, and West Bengal) to northern Bangladesh
	Clinotarsus curtipes (Jerdon, 1853)	bicolored frog or Malabar frog	Western Ghats of India
	Clinotarsus penelope Grosjean et al.., 2015	Palebrown stream frog	Peninsular Thailand from central Kachana Buri province south to Trang Province
