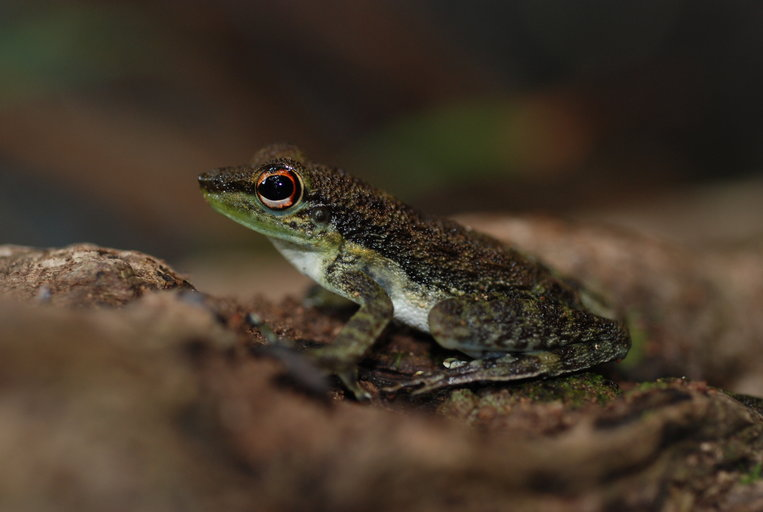
- Staurois natator

Scientific classification
- Kingdom: Animalia
- Phylum: Chordata
- Class: Amphibia
- Order: Anura
- Family: Ranidae
- Genus: Staurois; Cope, 1865

Diversity
- 6 species, and see text

= Staurois =

Genus of amphibians

Staurois is a small genus of minuscule true frogs. Most species in the genus are restricted to Borneo, but two species are from the Philippines. This genus is a quite ancient member of the true frog family, Ranidae. They are typically found in or near rapidly flowing, small rocky streams, and are sometimes known as splash frogs or foot-flagging frogs. The latter name refers to their unusual behavior of conspicuously waving their hindlegs and feet, as a way of signalling other members of the species. Similar behavior has also been documented in other frog genera, notably Hylodes and Micrixalus.

== Species ==
The six currently recognized species in the genus are:

- Staurois guttatus (Günther, 1858) - Borneo; formerly included in S. natator
- Staurois latopalmatus (Boulenger, 1887) - Borneo
- Staurois natator (Günther, 1858) - Philippines
- Staurois nubilus (Mocquard, 1890) - Philippines; formerly included in S. natator
- Staurois parvus Inger & Haile, 1960 - Borneo; sometimes included in S. tuberilinguis
- Staurois tuberilinguis Boulenger, 1918 - Borneo
