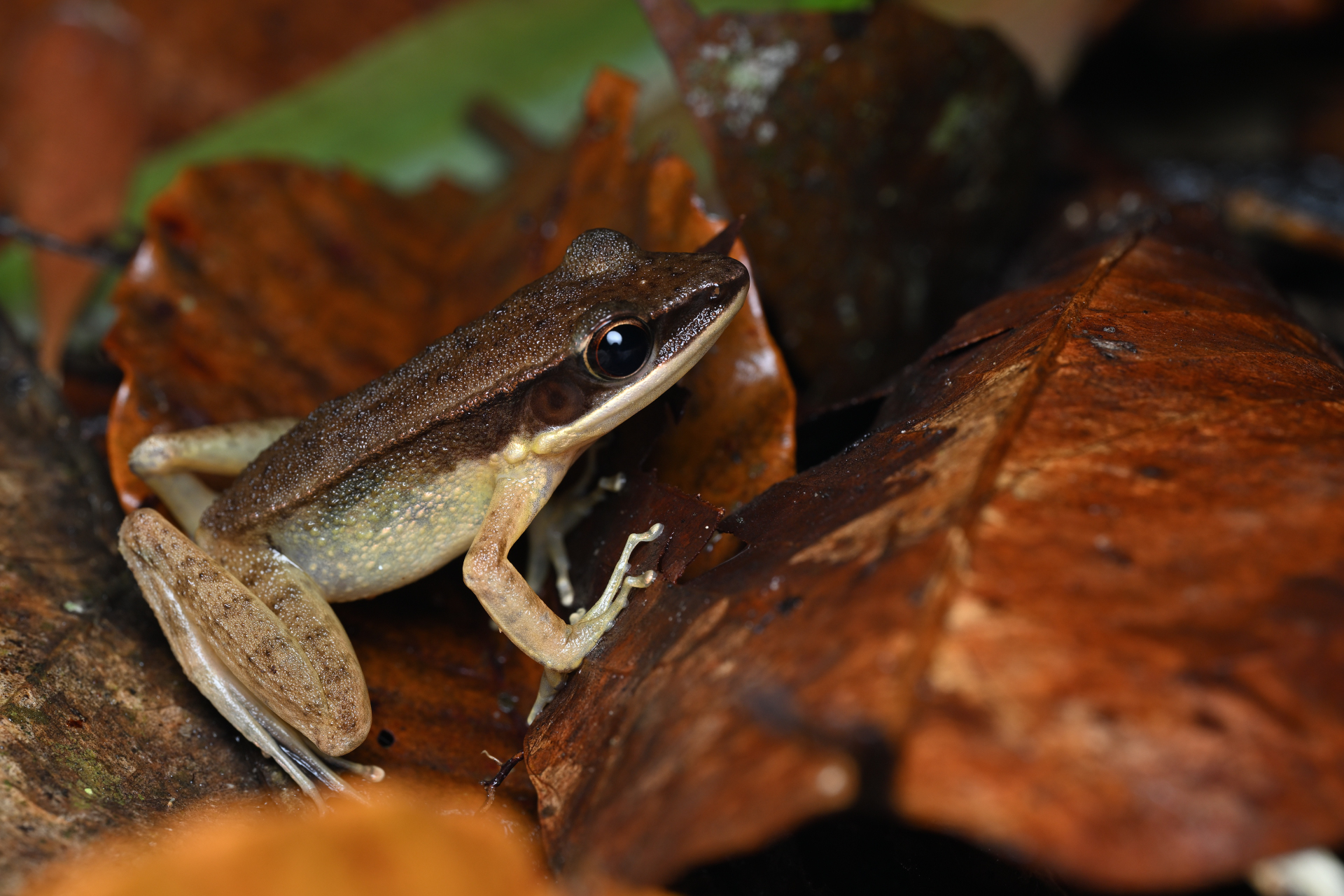

Conservation status
- Vulnerable (IUCN 3.1)

Scientific classification
- Kingdom: Animalia
- Phylum: Chordata
- Class: Amphibia
- Order: Anura
- Family: Ranidae
- Genus: Indosylvirana
- Species: I. serendipi

Binomial name
- Indosylvirana serendipi (Biju, Garg, Mahony, Wijayathilaka, Senevirathne, and Meegaskumbura, 2014)

Synonyms
- Hylarana serendipi Biju, Garg, Mahony, Wijayathilaka, Senevirathne, and Meegaskumbura, 2014

= Indosylvirana serendipi =

Sri Lankan golden-backed frog

Species of frog

Indosylvirana serendipi, or the Sri Lankan golden-backed frog, is a species of frog in the family Ranidae. It is endemic to Sri Lanka.

== Description ==
Body slender and head small. Supertympanic ridge absent. Subarticular tubercles prominent on toes. Third toe webbing extends up to the disc on the outside. Loreal region acute. Vomerine ridge present. Dermal fringe present. Dorsum reddish-brown with black. Tympanum area dark brown. Upper lip with a white stripe. Iris reddish brown with golden specks and dark patches. Flanks light yellowish-gray. Light brown limbs with grayish cross-bands. Ventrum whitish. Throat and limbs light grey. Male has a nuptial pad.

== Distribution ==
The frog is point endemic, where specimen only found from Kudawa araa of Sinharaja rain forest.

== Ecology ==
Its natural habitats are tropical lowland evergreen forests, banks of streams and in marshy areas.
