= Urumi =

Indian whip-sword

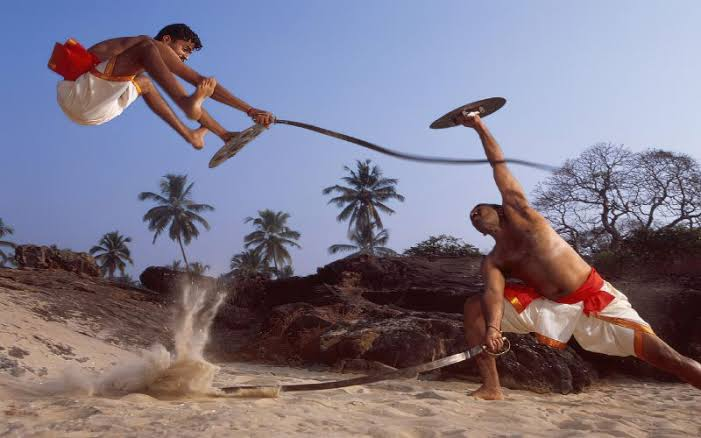
- Kerala kalari practitioners wielding urumi in a friendly spar.
- Type: Sword
- Place of origin: Kerala, India

Specifications
- Length: approx. 122–168 cm (48–66 in)

Urumi usage in Kalaripayattu demonstrated by Gangadharan Gurukkal in Perambra, Kozhikode.

An urumi is an Indian sword with a flexible, whip-like blade, secretly worn around the waist. Originating in modern-day Kerala, a state in southwestern India, it is thought to have existed from as early as the Sangam period.

It is treated as a whip sword, razor-sharp on both sides, made from a special combination of strong, flexible, sharpened steel (Wootz steel) and therefore requires prior knowledge of how to use a whip as well as a sword. For this reason, the urumi is almost always taught last in Indian martial arts such as Kalaripayattu.

The word urumi is used to refer to the weapon in Malayalam. In Kerala, it is also called chuttuval, from the Malayalam words for "coiling," or "spinning," (chuttu) and "sword" (val). In Sinhala, it is known as ethunu kaduwa.

== Structure ==
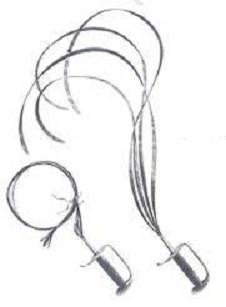
Drawn depiction of an urumi

The hilt of an urumi is constructed from iron or brass and is identical to that of the talwar, complete with a crossguard and frequently a slender knucklebow. The typical handle is termed a "disc hilt" from the prominent disc-shaped flange surrounding the pommel. The pommel often has a short decorative spike-like protrusion projecting from its centre. The blade is fashioned from flexible edged steel measuring 0.75 to 1 in (19 to 25 mm) in width. Ideally, the length of the blade should be the same as the wielder's armspan, usually between 4 and 5.5 ft (1.2 and 1.7 m). Multiple blades are often attached to a single handle. The Sri Lankan variation can have up to 32 blades and is typically dual-wielded, with one in each hand.

== Use ==
The urumi is handled like a flail but requires less strength since the blade combined with centrifugal force is sufficient to inflict injury. As with other "soft" weapons, proper use of the urumi requires control over the momentum of the blade. Thus, techniques used when wielding one include spins and agile manoeuvres. When not in use, the urumi is usually worn coiled around the waist like a belt, with the handle at the wearer's side.

Edgar Thurston, British phrenologist and ethnographer, documented the use of urumi by "Tiyans" in his study Castes and Tribes of Southern India.

== Legacy ==
A peptide found in the mucus of a South Indian frog is named urumin. This name is inspired from the urumi, since urumin kills the H1N1 flu virus effectively.

== In popular culture ==
The urumi is the weapon of choice of Mitsuri Kanroji, a character in the Demon Slayer manga series.

The urumi has made appearances in several video games. In the role-playing game Elden Ring, the urumi appears as a "Whip"-class weapon whose attacks cannot be parried. In the MOBA game League of Legends the urumi is wielded by the champion Nilah.

In the movie Ondanondu Kaladalli, popularly regarded as India's first martial arts movie, the characters portrayed by Shankar Nag and Sundar Raj face off in a duel to death, with both of them wielding urumis.

== See also ==
- Angampora
- Chain whip
- Kalaripayattu
- Silambam
