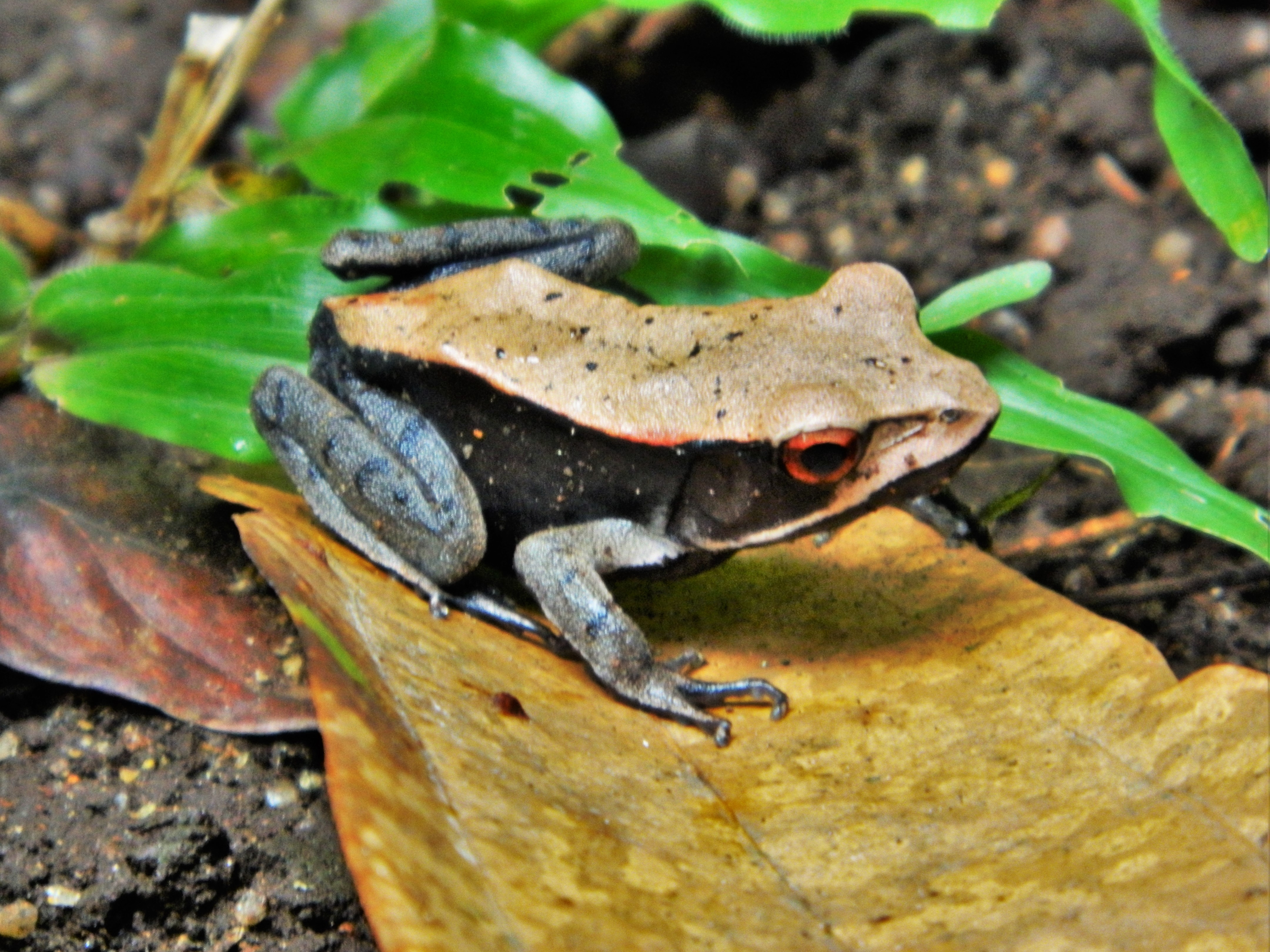
- Male in breeding colours

Conservation status
- Least Concern (IUCN 3.1)

Scientific classification
- Kingdom: Animalia
- Phylum: Chordata
- Class: Amphibia
- Order: Anura
- Family: Ranidae
- Genus: Clinotarsus
- Species: C. curtipes

Binomial name
- Clinotarsus curtipes (Jerdon, 1854)

Synonyms
- Rana curtipes Jerdon, 1854

= Bicolored frog =

Species of amphibian

The bicolored frog or Malabar frog (Clinotarsus curtipes) is a species of frog endemic to the Western Ghats of India. The tadpoles of the species are black and form dense and compact schools in slow moving streams in forested areas.

== Description ==
The bicolored frog's vomerine teeth scarcely developed, sometimes indistinct. The teeth are in two slightly oblique series on a level with the hind edge of the choanae. Its head large; snout short, rounded, with well-marked canthus rostralis and concave loreal region; nostril nearer to the end of the snout than to the eye; interorbital space broader than the upper eyelid; tympanum distinct, nearly as large as the eye. Fingers moderate, first extending beyond second; toes short, nearly entirely webbed; tips of fingers and toes swollen or dilated into very small disks; subarticular tubercles much developed; inner metatarsal tubercle small, oval, blunt; a rather large, flat tubercle at the base of the fourth toe; no tarsal fold. The tibio-tarsal articulation reaches the eye. Skin finely granular above; a moderately prominent, rather narrow glandular lateral fold; another told behind the tympanum down to the shoulder. Clinotarsus curtipes is greyish or brown above, with or without blackish dots; lateral fold lighter, edged with black; a blackish oblique spot or band below the eye; upper lip with a blackish margin; limbs dark purplish brown, without cross bands; light brown beneath, the throat sometimes dark brown. Male with an internal subgular vocal sac.

The spot patterns on the backs are often distinctive enough to use for population estimation using capture and recapture techniques. Use of this technique in the Bisale Reserve Forest in Kodagu during January 1999 – July 2001 gave a population density estimate of 0.08–0.1 frogs per square metre.

Adult frogs may occasionally feign death to escape predators.

The tadpoles are large (more than 9 cm (3.5 in) in total length) and form shoals in slow moving streams. They are collected for local consumption.

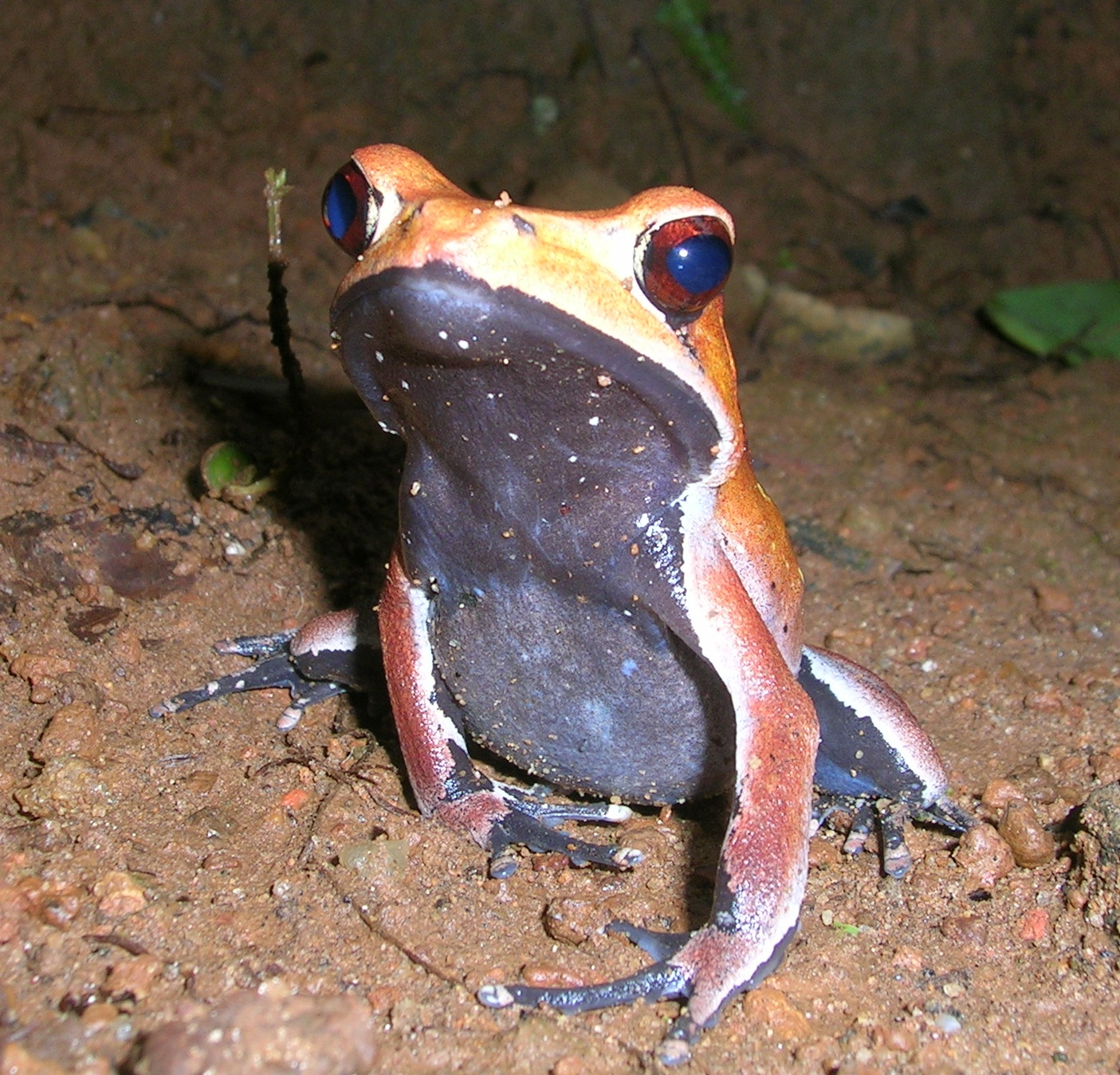
Underside of a breeding male

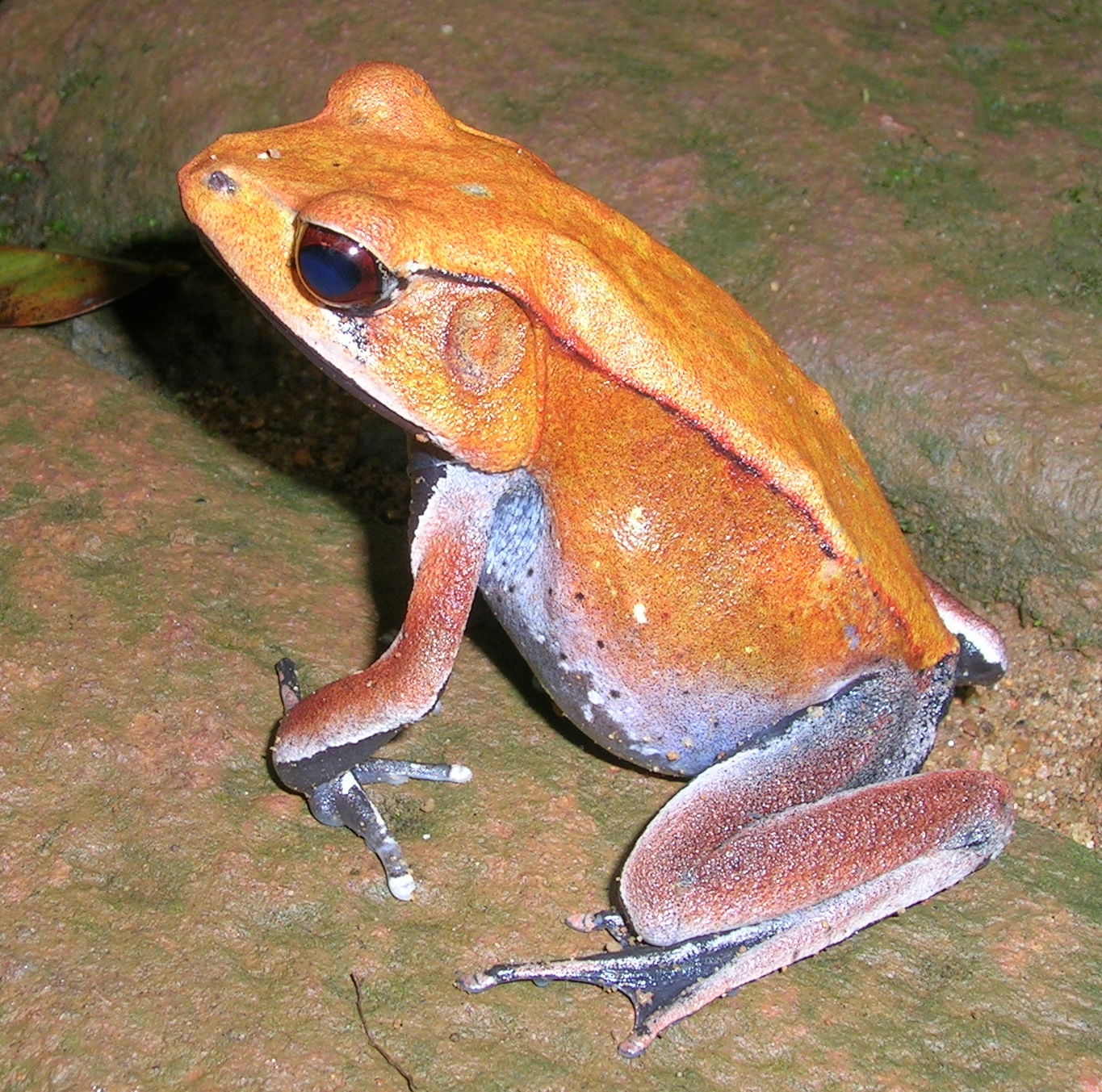
Upperside of a breeding male

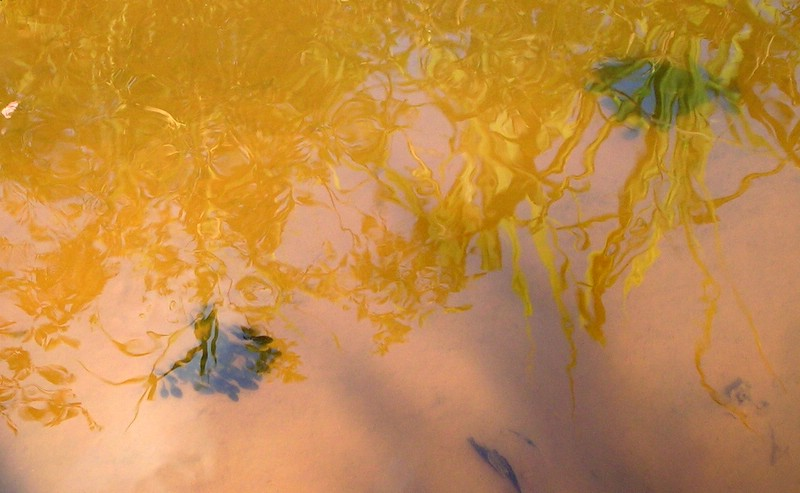
Shoals of tadpoles in a stream

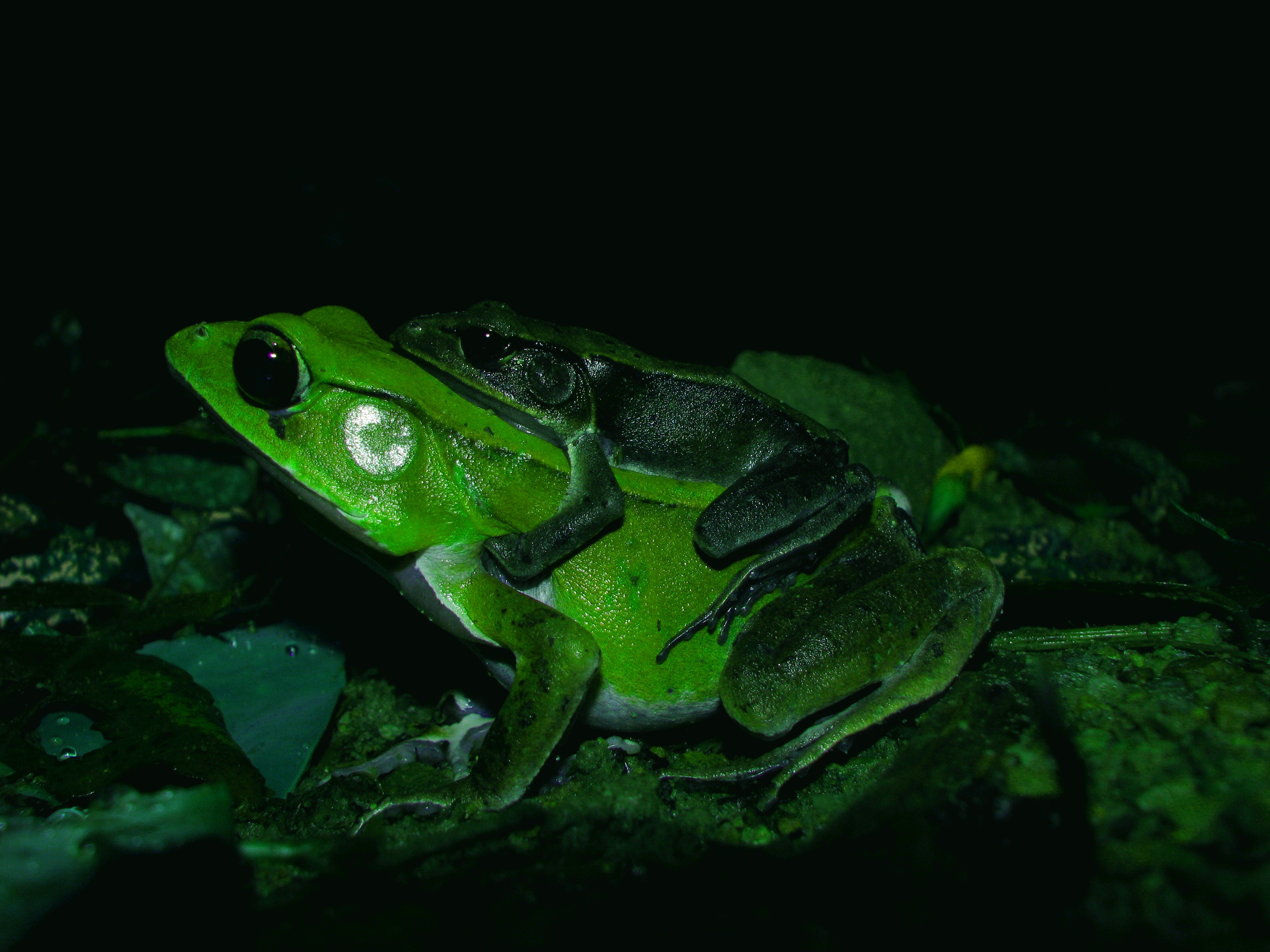
A pair in amplexus

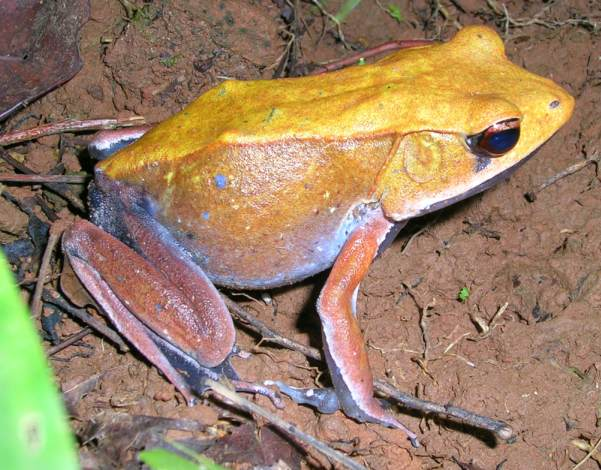

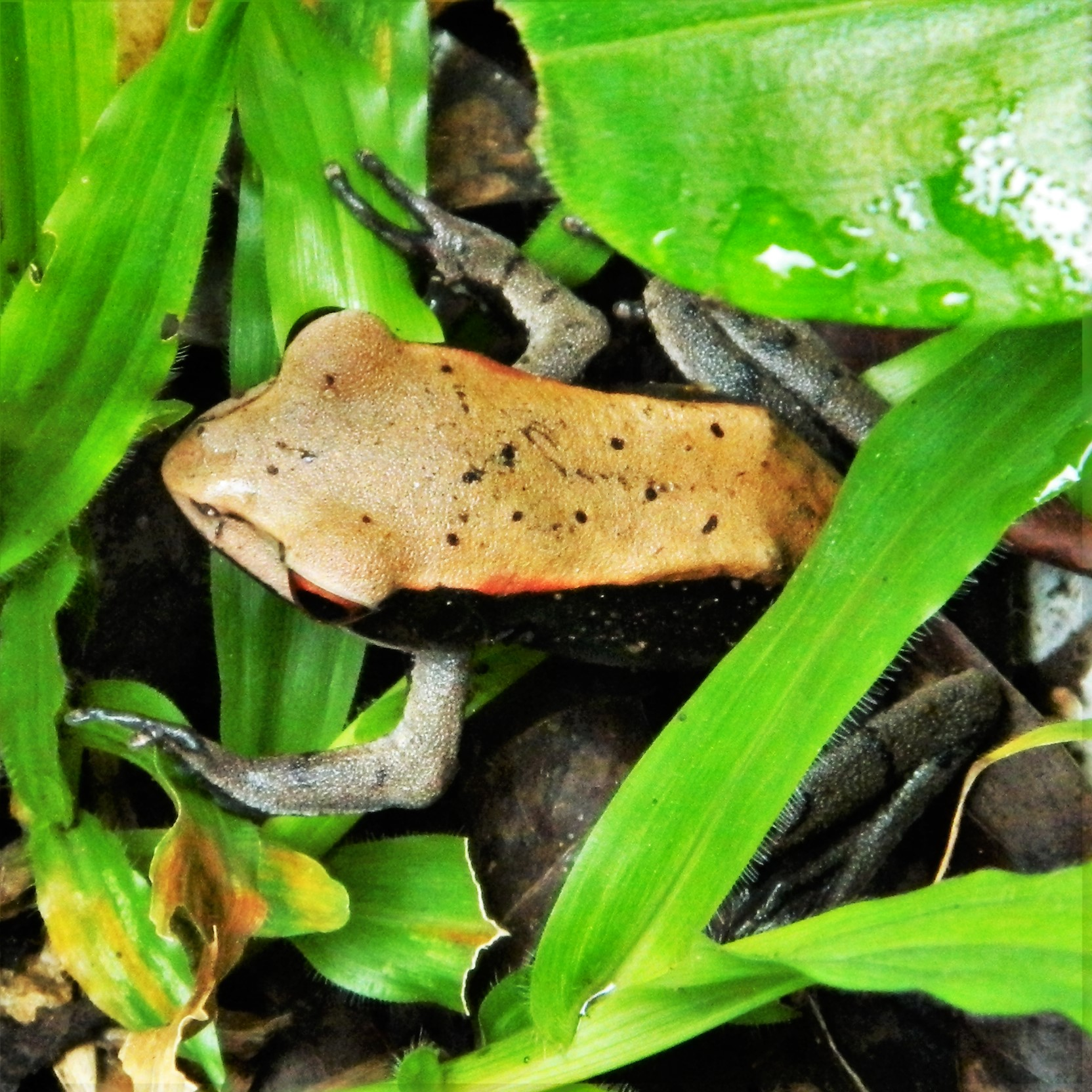
Malabar frog
