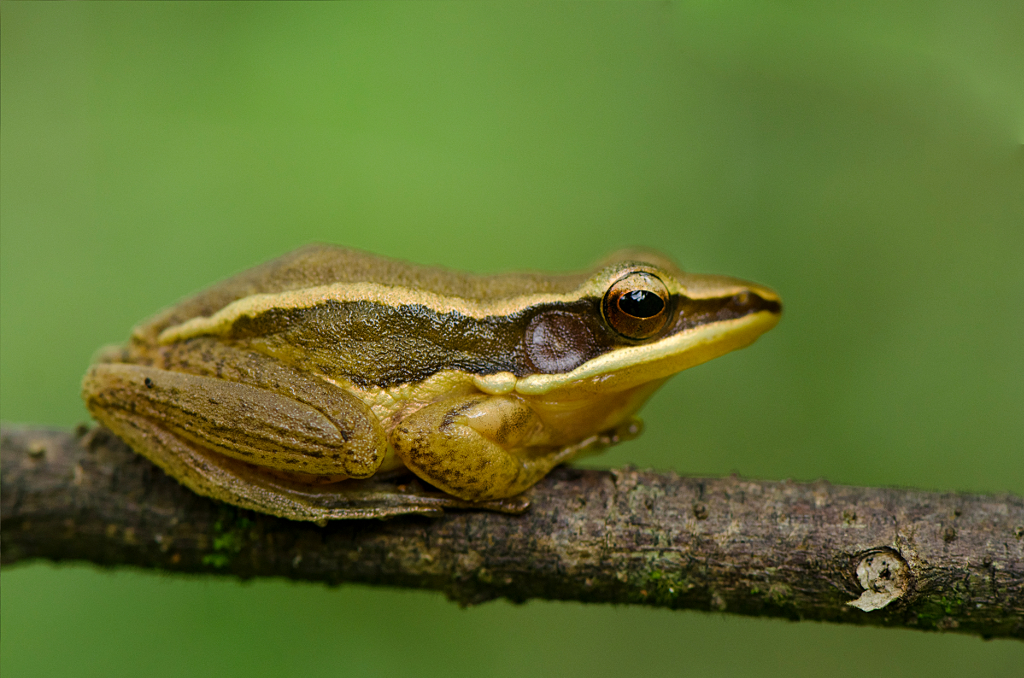

Conservation status
- Vulnerable (IUCN 3.1)

Scientific classification
- Kingdom: Animalia
- Phylum: Chordata
- Class: Amphibia
- Order: Anura
- Family: Ranidae
- Genus: Indosylvirana
- Species: I. aurantiaca

Binomial name
- Indosylvirana aurantiaca (Boulenger, 1904)

Synonyms
- Rana aurantiaca Boulenger, 1904; Rana bhagmandlensis Rao, 1922; Sylvirana aurantiaca (Boulenger, 1904)

= Indosylvirana aurantiaca =

Golden frog

Species of amphibian

Indosylvirana aurantiaca, commonly known as the golden frog, is a species of frog endemic to the Western Ghats of India. The species is also known as the Trivandrum frog, the common wood frog, or the small wood frog.

== Taxonomy ==
Indosylvirana aurantiaca is a part of the frog genus Indosylvirana which belongs to the family Ranidae. It was formerly considered a members of the genus Hylarana until the taxonomy of that genus was revised Indosylvirana aurantiaca was previously considered to be a possible species complex. Specimens recovered from Sri Lanka were previously misidentified as I. aurantiaca due to the lack of distinct color differences and morphological characteristics In 2014, a study confirmed that I. aurantiaca was endemic to the Western Ghats. There are no shared Hylarana sensu lato species between the Western Ghats and Sri Lanka. Using morphological and molecular data, seven new species were added to the Hylarana species that were previously known in the regions of the Western Ghats and Sri Lanka. The "small-sized" I. aurantiaca recovered from Sri Lanka was discovered to be a previously undescribed species, Indosylvirana serendipi.

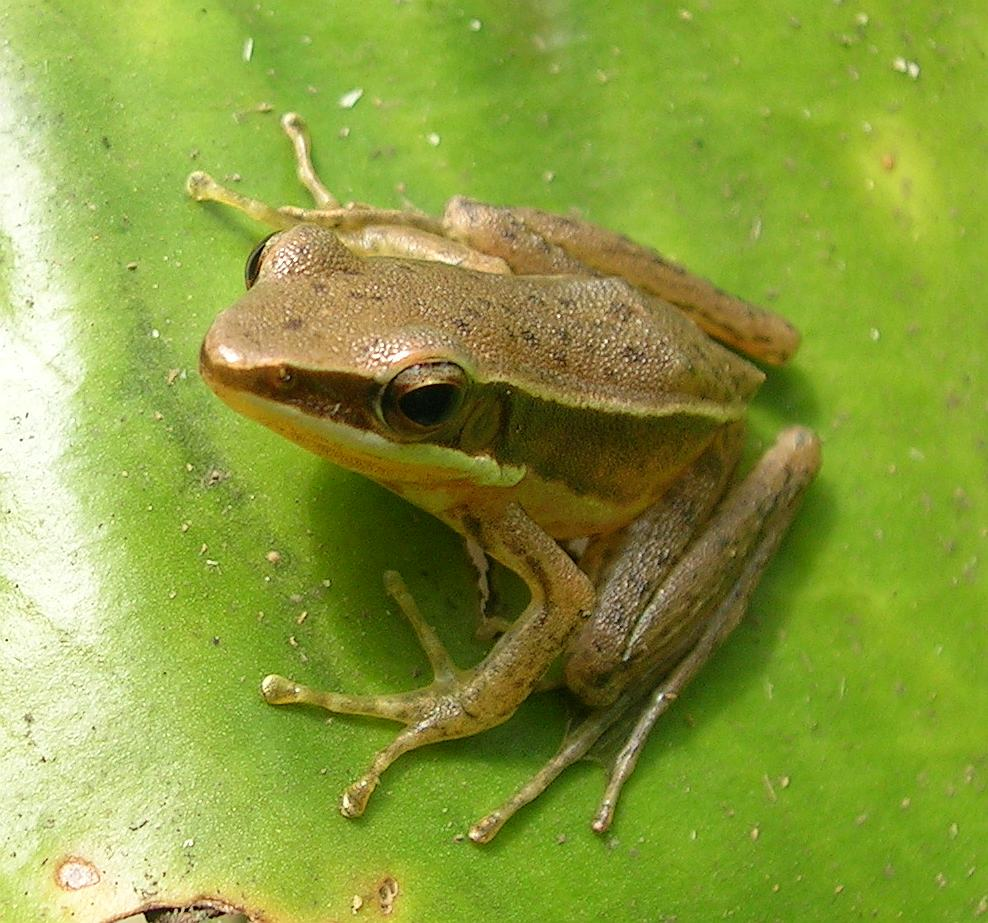

The species was first described by the Belgian-British zoologist George Albert Boulenger in 1904 as Rana aurantiaca. The type locality of the species is in Trivandrum, and the holotype is preserved in the Natural History Museum (BM 1947.2.2.92 formerly 1903.9.26.1). It was variously classified under the subgenera Hylorana, Hylarana, and Sylvirana while under the genus Rana. It was reclassified under Hylarana when the subgenus was split off from Rana in 2005. It was briefly put in Sylvirana in 2006, but Sylvirana is now considered to be a junior synonym of Hylarana. It now resides in Indosylvirana along with several other former Hylarana species.

== Description ==
Golden frogs are small to medium-sized frogs. Mature males grow to 32 to 55.7 mm (1.26 to 2.19 in). Females are larger, growing to 62.6 mm (2.46 in) long.

They have slender bodies with long, obtusely pointed snouts. The head is about 1.3 times longer than it is wide. The nares (nostrils) open to the sides, and are about twice as far from the eyes as the tip of the snout. The distance between them is more or less equal to the distance between the eyes. Vomerine teeth and pineal ocellus (parietal eye) are present. The vomerine teeth are nearer to the choanae than to each other. The oval shaped nares are covered by a flap of skin called the tympanum. The tympanum is about the same size as the eye. The lower rims of the eyes are reddish in color. The tympanum is visible but is not covered by a supratympanic fold.

The back (dorsum) of the golden frog is smooth or very finely granulated. It is orange to golden brown in color. It may have small black or brown speckles. A wide, dark brown strip at both sides runs from the nostrils to the rear. A narrow but prominent, bright yellow or gold-colored fold of skin runs from the back of the eye to the hind legs. The upper lip is also golden in color. The underside of the frog is lighter in color than the back, ranging from pale yellow to white. Younger frogs have brighter colors.

The fingers are long and slender. The first finger is longer than the second, and the third finger is longer than the snout; the tubercles on the undersides of the fingers are moderately sized. The tips of the fingers possess enlarged discs, with grooves running around each pad separating the top part from the bottom part. The toes are webbed but the fingers are not.

The hind limbs are also long and slender without distinct bars of color. The tibiotarsal articulation can reach to midway the eye and the snout. The tibia is about six times as long as it is wide and is about half the length of the head and body. It is shorter than the forelimb but is about as long as the foot. The toes are webbed three-quarters to two-thirds of the way, with the exception of the outer metatarsals, which may be separated almost to the base. The subarticular tubercles are small. They also possess discs at the tips like the fingers.

The male possesses an oval humeral gland at the base of each forearm. Their vocal sacs visibly inflate when they call.

Golden frogs closely resemble bronzed frogs (Indosylvirana temporalis), making it easy to confuse them.

== Distribution and habitat ==
Golden frogs are found in a wide variety of habitats, including lentic (lakes, ponds, and pools) and lotic (rivers, streams, or springs) ecosystems, evergreen forests and scrub, bamboo thickets, coastal areas, and rice paddies. They are semiarboreal and semiaquatic. Adult golden frogs are commonly found on rocks or perched on leaves and twigs near bodies of water.

They are endemic to the Western Ghats of India, restricted to the south of Palakkad Gap – Thiruvananthapuram and Kollam districts in the state of Kerala. They can be found 200 to 1,400 m (660 to 4,590 ft) asl in India.

== Ecology and life history ==
Golden Frogs are partially arboreal and partially aquatic. Typically found tropical wetlands, moist and swamp forest, and coastal regions, larvae are often found in running water while adults rest on rocks and other objects in and around bodies of water. From hatching to metamorphosis takes approximately 60 days, and they can be distinguished by observing dark bands on their hind limbs. They are normally nocturnal, though they can become active during light rains in the daytime. The males produce a soft, insect-like call. It can be described as "chik chik chik chik chik" or "pti ri ri ri ri" at intervals of 30 seconds. Larger males may have lower calls that can be described as "trrrk trrrk trrrrrk". Their main breeding season is between June and July. When fully mature, the tadpoles resemble miniature yellow adult frogs with pinkish tails.

== Conservation ==
Golden frogs are currently classified as Vulnerable by the International Union for Conservation of Nature and Natural Resources (IUCN). Their numbers are decreasing due to habitat loss. Populations are also highly fragmented due to the development of land for agriculture. They are currently protected in India by legislation.

== See also ==
- Indosylvirana temporalis, the bronzed frog
