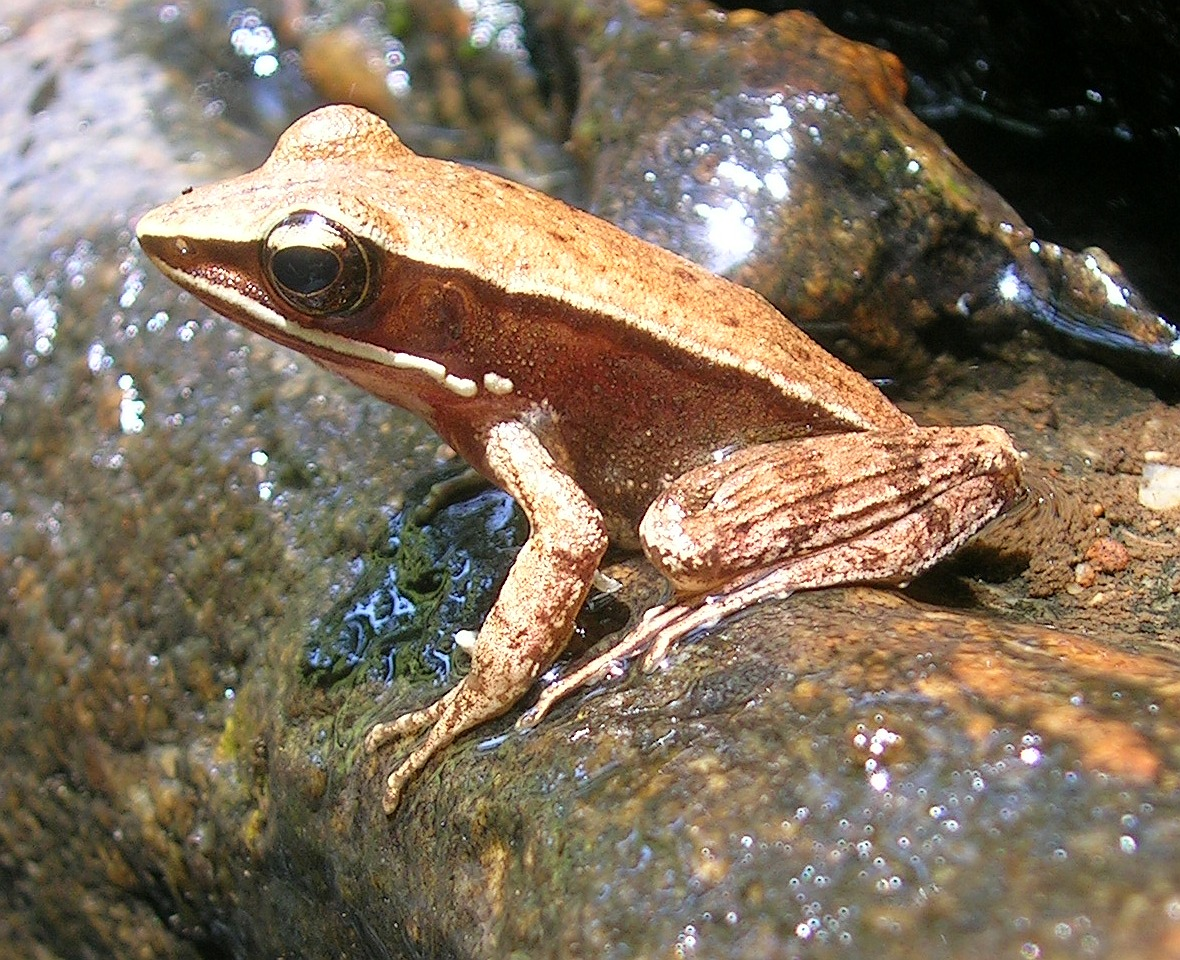
- Indosylvirana aurantiaca

Scientific classification
- Kingdom: Animalia
- Phylum: Chordata
- Class: Amphibia
- Order: Anura
- Family: Ranidae
- Genus: Indosylvirana; Oliver, Prendini, Kraus, and Raxworthy, 2015

Type species
- Rana flavescens Jerdon, 1853

Diversity
- 13 species

= Indosylvirana =

Genus of amphibians

Indosylvirana is a genus of ranid frogs endemic to South and Southeast Asia.

== Species ==
There are 13 species:

- Indosylvirana aurantiaca (Boulenger, 1904)
- Indosylvirana caesari (Biju, Mahony, Wijayathilaka, Senevirathne, and Meegaskumbura, 2014)
- Indosylvirana doni (Biju, Garg, Mahony, Wijayathilaka, Senevirathne, and Meegaskumbura, 2014)
- Indosylvirana flavescens (Jerdon, 1853)
- Indosylvirana indica (Biju, Garg, Mahony, Wijayathilaka, Senevirathne, and Meegaskumbura, 2014)
- Indosylvirana intermedia (Rao, 1937)
- Indosylvirana magna (Biju, Garg, Mahony, Wijayathilaka, Senevirathne, and Meegaskumbura, 2014)
- Indosylvirana montana (Rao, 1922)
- Indosylvirana serendipi (Biju, Garg, Mahony, Wijayathilaka, Senevirathne, and Meegaskumbura, 2014)
- Indosylvirana sreeni (Biju, Garg, Mahony, Wijayathilaka, Senevirathne, and Meegaskumbura, 2014)
- Indosylvirana temporalis (Günther, 1864)
- Indosylvirana urbis (Biju, Garg, Mahony, Wijayathilaka, Senevirathne, and Megaskumbara, 2014)
