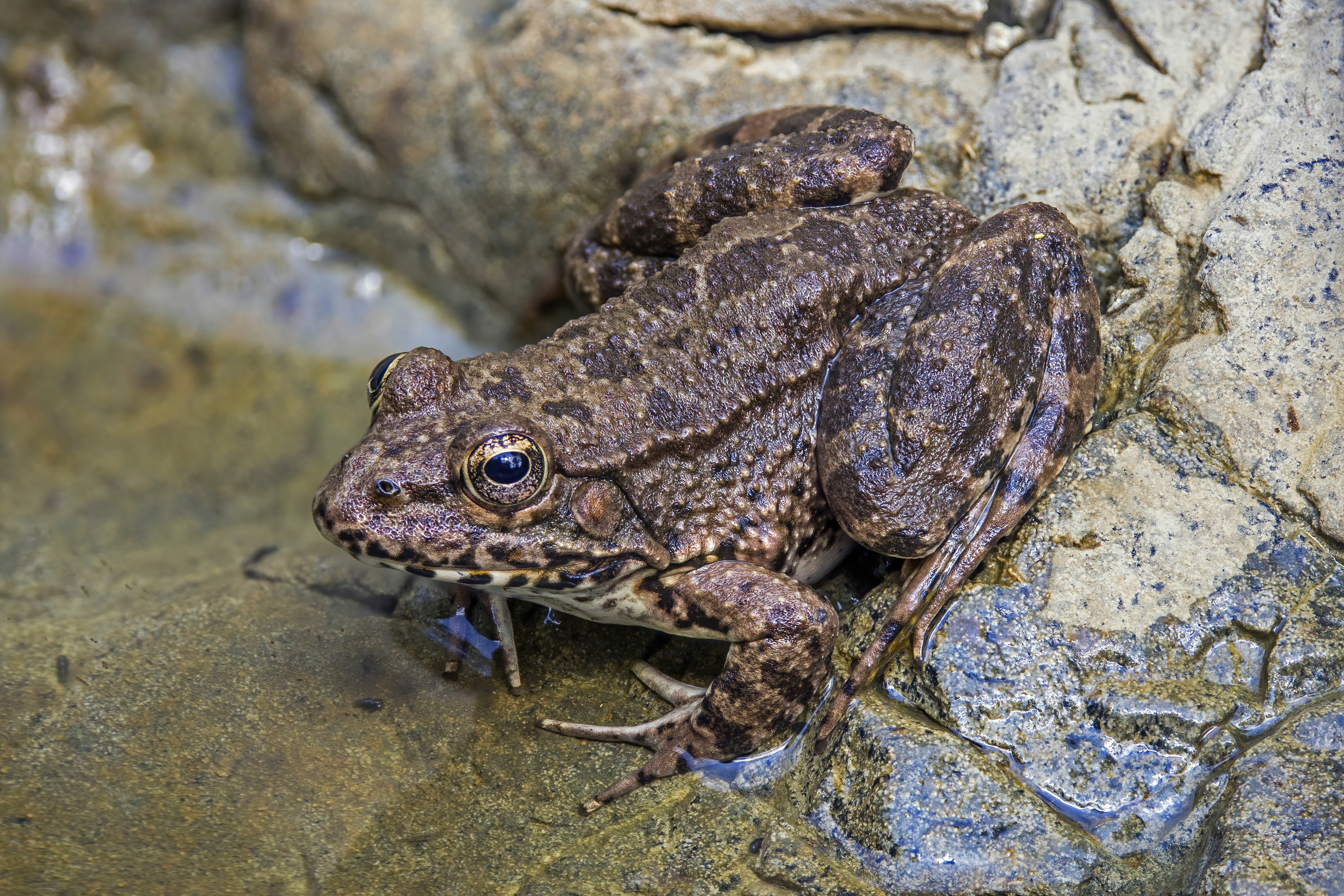
- Cyprus water frog (Pelophylax cypriensis)

Scientific classification
- Kingdom: Animalia
- Phylum: Chordata
- Class: Amphibia
- Order: Anura
- Suborder: Neobatrachia
- Superfamily: Ranoidea
- Family: Ranidae; Rafinesque, 1814

Synonyms
- See text

= Ranidae =

Family of frogs

Ranidae is a family of frogs, sometimes called "true frogs". They have the widest distribution of any frog family. They are abundant throughout most of the world, occurring on all continents except Antarctica. The true frogs are present in North America, northern South America, Europe, Africa (including Madagascar), and Asia. The Asian range extends across the East Indies to New Guinea and a single species, the Australian wood frog (Papurana daemelii), has spread into the far north of Australia.

Typically, true frogs are smooth and moist-skinned, with large, powerful legs and extensively webbed feet. The true frogs vary greatly in size, ranging from small—such as the wood frog (Lithobates sylvatica)—to large.

Many of the true frogs are aquatic or live close to water. Most species lay their eggs in the water and go through a tadpole stage. However, as in most families of frogs, there is large variation of habitat within the family. There are also arboreal species of true frogs, and the family includes some of the very few amphibians that can live in brackish water.

== Evolution ==
The Ranidae are related to several other frog families that have Eurasian and Indian origins, including Rhacophoridae, Dicroglossidae, Nyctibatrachidae, Micrixalidae, and Ranixalidae. They are thought to be most closely related to the Indian-endemic Nyctibatrachidae, from which they diverged in the early Eocene. However, other studies recover a closer relationship with the Dicroglossidae. The Ranidae began to disperse out of Asia at the end of the Eocene and by the beginning of the Miocene, colonized every continent except Antarctica. The Ranidae are known as cosmopolitan, able to be found in every continent, only excluding Antarctica.

It was previously thought that the Ranidae and their closest relatives were of Gondwanan origins, having evolved on Insular India during the Cretaceous. They were then entirely restricted to the Indian subcontinent until the late Eocene, when India collided with Asia, allowing the Ranidae to colonize Eurasia and eventually the rest of the world. However, more recent studies instead propose that the Ranidae originated in Eurasia, and their close relationship with India-endemic frog lineages is due to those lineages colonizing India from Eurasia during the Paleogene.

== Systematics ==
The subdivisions of the Ranidae are still a matter of dispute, although most are coming to an agreement. Several former subfamilies are now recognised as separate families (Petropedetidae, Cacosterninae, Mantellidae, and Dicroglossidae). The genus Rana has now been split up and is much reduced in size.

While too little of the vast diversity of true frogs has been subject to recent studies to say something definite, as of mid-2008, studies are going on, and several lineages are recognizable.

- The genus Staurois is probably a very ancient offshoot of the main Raninae lineage.
- Amolops has been generally delimited as a monophyletic group.
- Odorrana and Rana plus some proposed minor genera (which probably ought to be included in the latter) form another group.
- A group including Clinotarsus, Huia in the strict sense and Meristogenys
- An ill-defined assemblage of Babina, Glandirana, Hylarana, Pulchrana, Sanguirana, and Sylvirana, as well as Hydrophylax and Pelophylax, which are probably not monophyletic. Some authorities have treated them as junior synonyms of the genus Hylarana.

The following phylogeny of some genera was recovered by Che et al., 2007 using mitochondrial genes.

- - Staurois
  - - - Amolops
      - - Pelophylax
        - - Clinotarsus
          - Meristogenys
    - - - Pulchrana
        - - - Hylarana
            - Sylvirana (1)
          - - - - Papurana
                - Sylvirana (2)
              - - Hydrophylax
                - Indosylvirana
            - - Sylvirana (3)
              - - Sylvirana (4)
                - Chalcorana
      - - - Glandirana
          - - Pseudorana
            - - - Odorrana
                - Nidirana
              - - Rana
                - Lithobates

=== Genera ===
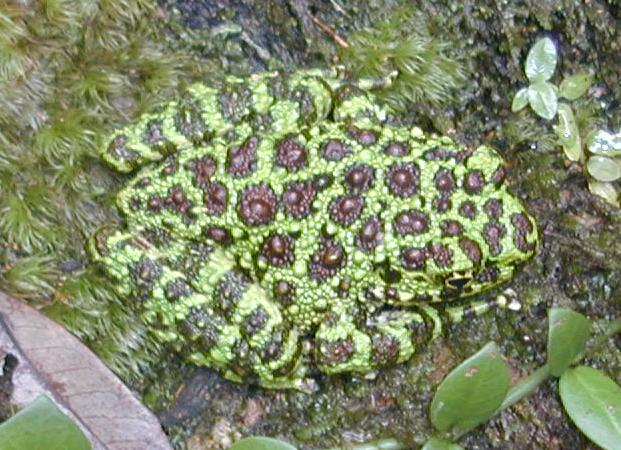
Ishikawa's frog (Odorrana ishikawae)

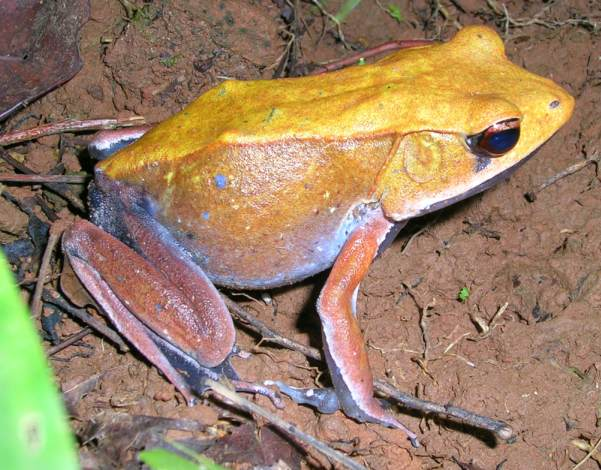
Bicolored frog (Clinotarsus curtipes), related to Meristogenys and Huia

Most of the subfamilies formerly included under Ranidae are now treated as separate families, leaving only Raninae remaining. The following genera are recognised in the family Ranidae:

- Abavorana Oliver, Prendini, Kraus, and Raxworthy, 2015 (three species)
- Amnirana Dubois, 1992 (11 species)
- Amolops Cope, 1865 (80 species)
- Babina Thompson, 1912 (two species)
- Chalcorana Dubois, 1992 (nine species)
- Clinotarsus Mivart 1869 (three species)
- Glandirana Fei, Ye, and Huang, 1990 (six species)
- Huia Yang, 1991 (monotypic)
- Humerana Dubois, 1992 (four species)
- Hydrophylax Fitzinger, 1843 (four species)
- Hylarana Tschudi 1838 (four species)
- Indosylvirana Oliver, Prendini, Kraus, and Raxworthy, 2015 (13 species)
- Lithobates Fitzinger, 1843 (55 species)
- Meristogenys Yang, 1991 (13 species)
- Nidirana Dubois, 1992 (19 species)
- Odorrana Fei, Ye, and Huang, 1990 (64 species)
- Papurana Dubois, 1992 (19 species)
- Pelophylax Fitzinger 1843 (19 species)
- Pseudorana Fei, Ye, and Huang, 1990 (monotypic)
- Pterorana Kiyasetuo and Khare, 1986 (monotypic)
- Pulchrana Dubois, 1992 (18 species)
- Rana Linnaeus, 1758 (58 species)
- Sanguirana Dubois, 1992 (six species)
- Staurois Cope, 1865 (six species)
- Sumaterana Arifin, Smart, Hertwig, Smith, Iskandar, and Haas, 2018 (three species)
- Sylvirana Dubois, 1992 (12 species)
- Wijayarana Arifin, Chan, Smart, Hertwig, Smith, Iskandar, and Haas, 2021 (five species)

In 2023, Amphibian Species of the World tentatively synonymized Amnirana, Chalcorana, Humerana, Hydrophylax, Indosylvirana, Papurana, Pulchrana, and Sylvirana into Hylarana until significant taxonomic confusion surrounding the group could be cleared up. These changes are not recognized by AmphibiaWeb.

=== Incertae sedis ===
A number of taxa are placed in Ranidae incertae sedis, that is, their taxonomic status is too uncertain to allow more specific placement.

- "Hylarana" chitwanensis (Das, 1998)
- "Hylarana" garoensis (Boulenger, 1920)
- "Hylarana" latouchii (Boulenger, 1899)
- "Hylarana" margariana Anderson, 1879
- "Hylarana" montivaga (Smith, 1921)
- "Hylarana" persimilis (Van Kampen, 1923)

== See also ==
- Halipegus eccentricus, a monoecious, digenea parasitic trematode commonly found in true frogs in North America
