= Wood frog (disambiguation) =

The wood frog is an amphibian that has a broad distribution over North America.

Wood frog may also refer to:

- Australian wood frog, a frog found in Australia
- Long-legged wood frog, a frog found in Armenia, Azerbaijan, Georgia, Iran, Russia, Turkey, and Turkmenistan
- Siberian wood frog, a frog found in North Asia
- Small wood frog, a frog endemic to the Western Ghats of India
- Wood frog (Southeast Asia), a frog found in Cambodia, Laos, Myanmar, Thailand, and Vietnam
