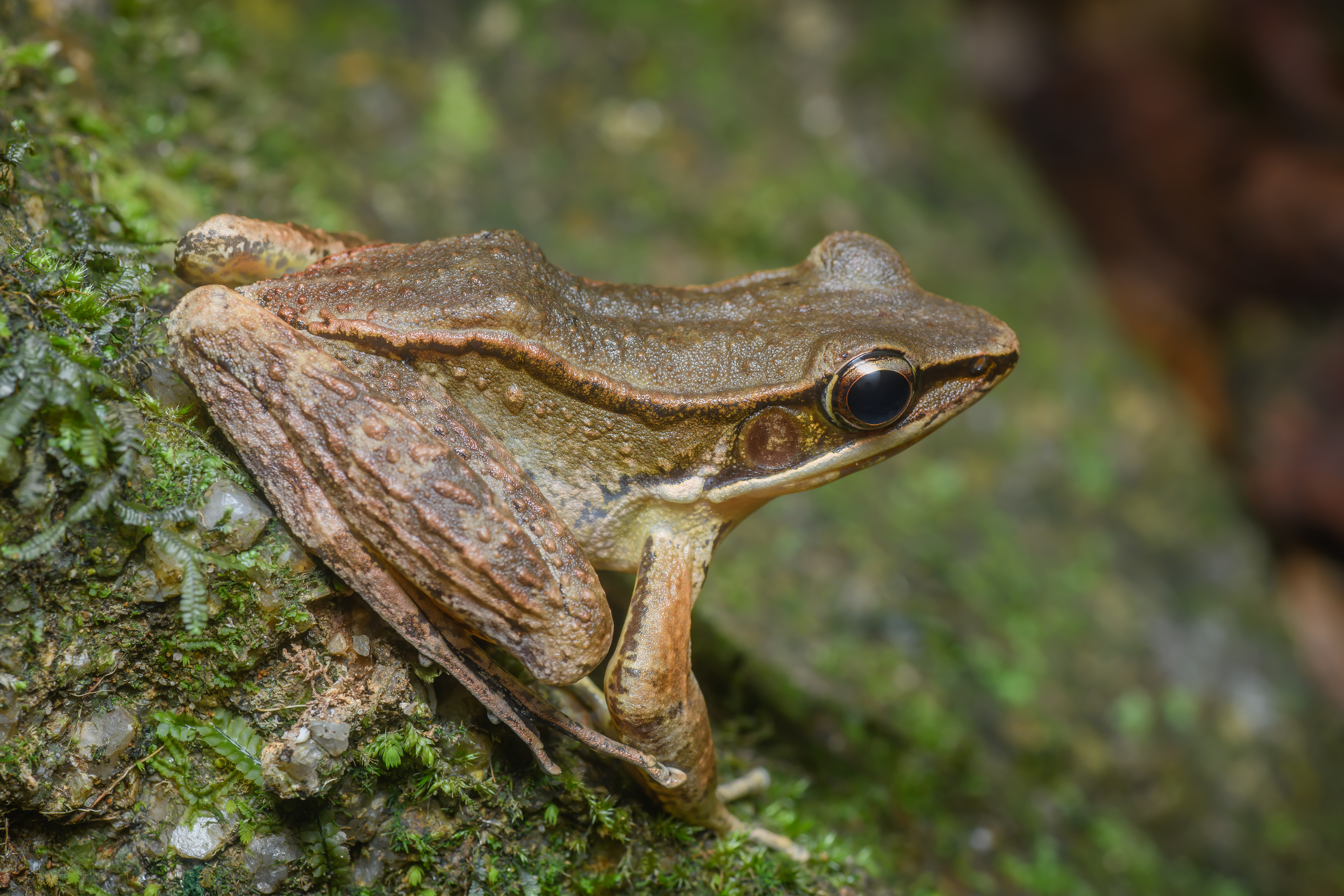

Conservation status
- Vulnerable (IUCN 3.1)

Scientific classification
- Kingdom: Animalia
- Phylum: Chordata
- Class: Amphibia
- Order: Anura
- Family: Ranidae
- Genus: Sylvirana
- Species: S. faber

Binomial name
- Sylvirana faber (Ohler, Swan & Daltry, 2002)

Synonyms
- Hylarana faber (Ohler, Swan & Daltry, 2002); Rana faber Ohler, Swan & Daltry, 2002

= Sylvirana faber =

Species of frog

Sylvirana faber is a species of frog in the family Ranidae. It is found in Cambodia and possibly Thailand.

Its natural habitats are subtropical or tropical moist lowland forests, subtropical or tropical swamps, subtropical or tropical moist montane forests, subtropical or tropical moist shrubland, subtropical or tropical high-altitude grassland, rivers, rural gardens, and heavily degraded former forest.

The adult frog measures 59.4 mm in snout-vent length. The head is long and narrow. There are eight vomerine teeth in the jaw.

The skin of the dorsum is light brown in color and the flanks and tympanum are dark brown. There are dark brown stripes on the hind legs. The ventrum is white and the inner surfaces of the legs are pink. There are climbing disks on the toes.

Scientists consider this frog a sister taxon to Rana nigrovittata and Rana mortenseni.
