= Sylvirana roberti =

Scientific classification
- Kingdom: Animalia
- Phylum: Chordata
- Class: Amphibia
- Order: Anura
- Family: Ranidae
- Genus: Sylvirana
- Species: S. roberti

Binomial name
- Sylvirana roberti Sheridan and Stuart, 2018

Synonyms
- Hylarana roberti

Species of frog

Sylvirana roberti, the Tenaserim dark-side frog or Robert's dark-side frog, is a frog in the family Ranidae. It is endemic to peninsular Myanmar. Scientists believe it may also live in Thailand.

Scientists consider this frog a sister taxon to Sylvirana nigrovittata and Sylvirana malayana.

The adult male frog measures 41.6–45.4 mm in snout-vent length and scientists reported one female frog to be 49.2 mm long. This skin of the dorsum is medium-brown in color, with one dark stripe running down each side from the nose to the groin. There are spots on the front legs and stripes on the hind legs. The iris of the eye is gold brown on the top third and darker brown below.

This frog has vomerine teeth in its jaw and climbing disks on its toes. It has robust front legs and muscular hind legs. This frog does not have a pineal gland. It has a large humeral gland.

The scientists who wrote the first paper about this frog named it after their friend and mentor, Dr. Robert F. Inger. Dr. Inger worked as Curator Emeritus of Amphibians and Reptiles at the Field Museum of Natural History.
