= Papurana volkerjane =

Conservation status
- Least Concern (IUCN 3.1)

Scientific classification
- Kingdom: Animalia
- Phylum: Chordata
- Class: Amphibia
- Order: Anura
- Family: Ranidae
- Genus: Papurana
- Species: P. volkerjane

Binomial name
- Papurana volkerjane (Günther, 2003)

Synonyms
- Rana volkerjane Günther, 2003; Sylvirana volkerjane (Günther, 2003); Hylarana volkerjane (Günther, 2003)

Species of amphibian

Papurana volkerjane is a species of true frogs, family Ranidae. It is endemic to New Guinea and is known from its type locality, the eastern slopes of the Wondiwoi Mountains, from the Fakfak Mountains (both in West Papua, Indonesia), and from the Bewani and Torricelli Mountainss in the West Sepik Province, Papua New Guinea. Rainer Günther named the species after his son Volker and daughter-in-law Jane.

== Description ==
Papurana volkerjane is a relatively large species, with adult males measuring 70–76 mm (2.8–3.0 in) and adult females 97–105 mm (3.8–4.1 in) in snout–vent length. The overall appearance is robust. It is morphologically similar to Papurana aurata but has distinctive small glandular ridges across dorsal surface of thighs, as well as a solid white longitudinal stripe, surrounded by a blackish area, on the posterior thigh. The species shows strong sexual dimorphism in colour, at least among individuals in mating condition. Males are dorsally yellow-greyish to golden-yellow, whereas females are brownish or reddish-brown. In males, the flanks have similar colouration as the dorsum, whereas females have lighter lower flanks. Sub-canthal and post-ocular strip is black and continuous. Throat is darkly marbled in some males but only weakly marbled with grey in most individuals. Belly is typically white but some males have intense yellow bellies.

The male advertisement call is complex and last 3–9 seconds. Calls typically start with a mixture of softer and harsher squawks; the harsh squawking notes become quicker and louder during the course of the call. At the end of "complete" calls, there is a shorter or longer series of twitters.

== Habitat and conservation ==
Papurana volkerjane occurs in closed-canopy primary rainforest in association with slow-flowing streams at elevations of 250–900 m (820–2,950 ft) above sea level in West Papua, 210–1,050 m (690–3,440 ft) in Papua New Guinea. Adults can be found perched on the leaves in low vegetation, 0.5–2 m (2–7 ft) above the ground. Tadpoles have been found in streams and from a roadside ditch.
