= Leaf frog (disambiguation) =

The leaf frogs (Phyllomedusinae) are a subfamily of frogs in the family Hylidae.

Leaf frog may also refer to:

- Leaf frog (Africa) (Leptopelis), a genus of frog in the family Arthroleptidae found in Africa
- Leaf frog (Southeast Asia) (Hylarana erythraea), a frog in the family Ranidae found in Southeast Asia
