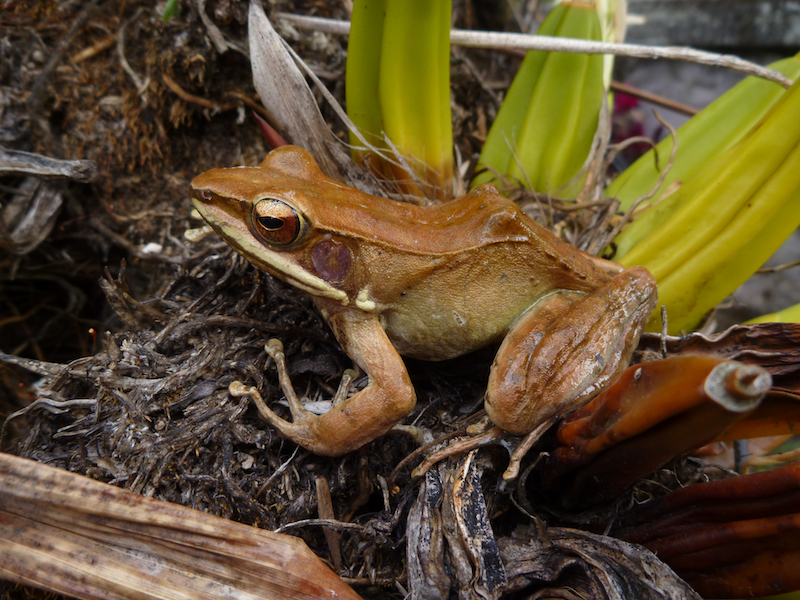

Conservation status
- Least Concern (IUCN 3.1)

Scientific classification
- Kingdom: Animalia
- Phylum: Chordata
- Class: Amphibia
- Order: Anura
- Family: Ranidae
- Genus: Papurana
- Species: P. florensis

Binomial name
- Papurana florensis (Boulenger, 1897)

Synonyms
- Rana florensis Boulenger, 1897; Hylarana florensis (Boulenger, 1897); Sylvirana florensis (Boulenger, 1897)

= Papurana florensis =

Floresian frog

Species of Amphibia

Papurana florensis is a species of true frog. It is native to the islands of Lombok, Sumbawa, and Flores in Indonesia. Common names Floresian frog and Flores frog have been coined for it.

== Taxonomy ==
Based on molecular data, the previously very diverse genus Hylarana was split in several genera, many of them previously treated as subgenera, in 2015. Molecular data from Papurana florensis was not included in the study, and therefore its placement in Papurana is provisional, pending more morphological and molecular data.

== Habitat and conservation ==
Papurana florensis is a lowland species that lives in wet areas of lowland dry forests and savannas, e.g., in marshes and streams. It is an uncommon species. Threats to it are unknown, as is its presence in protected areas.
