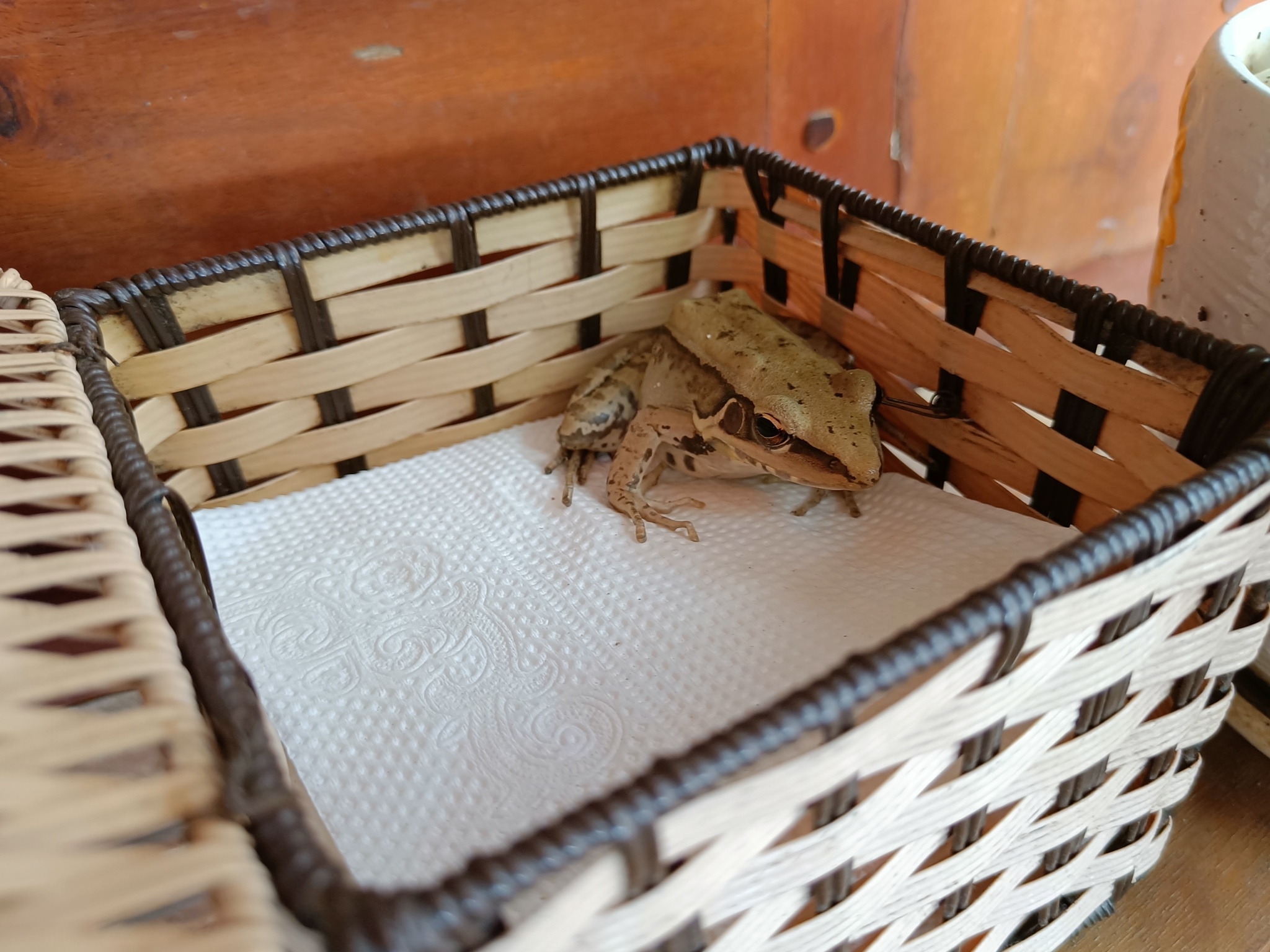

Scientific classification
- Kingdom: Animalia
- Phylum: Chordata
- Class: Amphibia
- Order: Anura
- Family: Ranidae
- Genus: Sylvirana
- Species: S. annamitica

Binomial name
- Sylvirana annamitica Sheridan and Stuart, 2018

= Sylvirana annamitica =

Species of frog

Sylvirana annamitica, the Annam stream frog, is a frog in the family Ranidae. It is endemic to Vietnam and Laos. Scientists think it may also live in China.

Scientists consider this frog a sister taxon of Sylvirana montosa.
