= H. celebensis =

H. celebensis may refer to:

- Harpyionycteris celebensis, the Sulawesi harpy fruit bat, a bat species
- Hylarana celebensis, a frog species
