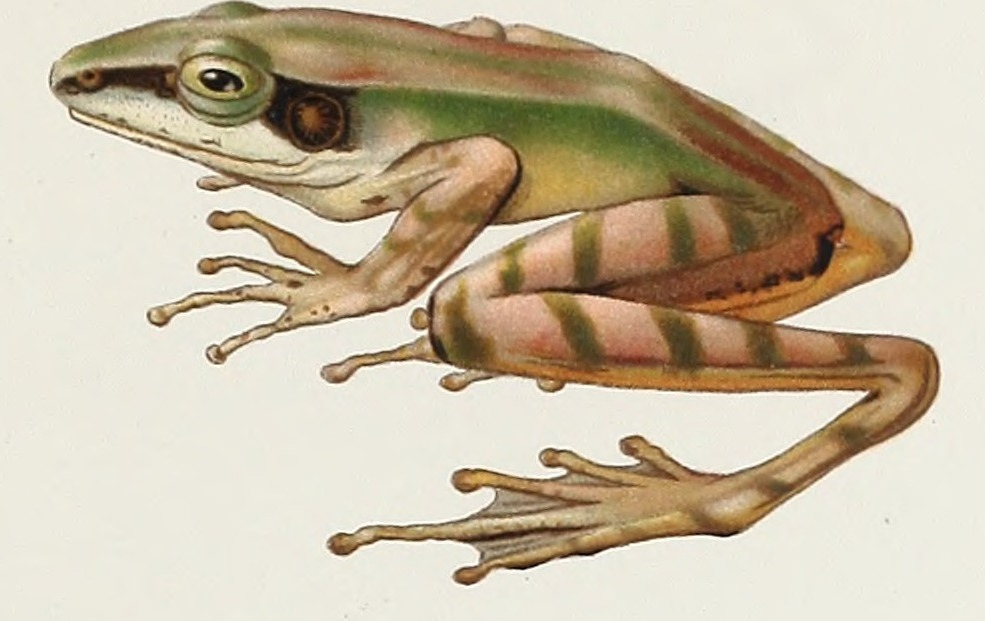

Conservation status
- Least Concern (IUCN 3.1)

Scientific classification
- Kingdom: Animalia
- Phylum: Chordata
- Class: Amphibia
- Order: Anura
- Family: Ranidae
- Genus: Papurana
- Species: P. moluccana

Binomial name
- Papurana moluccana (Boettger, 1895)

Synonyms
- Rana moluccana Boettger, 1895; Hylarana moluccana Boettger, 1895; Sylvirana moluccana Boettger, 1895

= Papurana moluccana =

Moluccas frog

Species of amphibian

Papurana moluccana is a species of true frog. It is endemic to the Maluku Islands (the Moluccas) of Indonesia; specifically, it is known from Halmahera and Bacan. Common name Moluccas frog has been coined for it.

== Taxonomy ==
Based on molecular data, the previously very diverse genus Hylarana was split in several genera, many of them previously treated as subgenera, in 2015. Molecular data from Papurana moluccana was not included in the study, and therefore its placement in Papurana is provisional, pending more morphological and molecular data.

== Habitat and conservation ==
This presumably common species has been found in water-filled pits in a village. It can occur at elevations up to 700 m (2,300 ft) above sea level. It might be threatened by logging. It is not known to occur in any protected areas.
