= Papurana attigua =

Conservation status
- Least Concern (IUCN 3.1)

Scientific classification
- Kingdom: Animalia
- Phylum: Chordata
- Class: Amphibia
- Order: Anura
- Family: Ranidae
- Genus: Papurana
- Species: P. attigua

Binomial name
- Papurana attigua (Inger, Orlov, and Darevsky, 1999)

Synonyms
- Rana attigua Inger, Orlov, and Darevsky, 1999; Hylarana attigua (Inger, Orlov, and Darevsky, 1999); Sylvirana attigua (Inger, Orlov, and Darevsky, 1999)

Species of frog

Papurana attigua is a species of frog in the family Ranidae, the "true frogs". It is found in central and south Vietnam, eastern Cambodia, and southern Laos. The specific name attigua is derived from Latin attiguus meaning "neighbor". It refers to the similarity of this species to Indosylvirana milleti. The common name similar frog has been coined for this species.

== Description ==
Adult males measure 40–45 mm (1.6–1.8 in) and adult females 55–65 mm (2.2–2.6 in) in snout–vent length. The overall appearance is moderately stocky. The head is longer than it is broad and the snout is obtusely pointed, but rounded and projecting in lateral view. The tympanum is distinct, relatively larger in males than in females. The finger tips bear small discs. The toe discs are also small, but can be slightly larger than the fingers ones. The toes are partially webbed. There are conspicuous, continuous dorsolateral folds. Skin is dorsally granular with small tubercles, with larger tubercles on the sides. In many individuals, both males and females, the tubercles have white, spinose tips. Dorsal coloration is medium brown and may include small darker spots. A dark brown to black narrow band runs from the snout through the eye and the tympanum, becoming less defined in the temporal area. The upper lip has white to yellow stripe. The limbs have dark brown crossbars.

== Habitat and conservation ==
This species occurs in wet evergreen forests, typically along streams (including rapids and waterfalls), as well as mixed evergreen and deciduous forests with bamboo, at elevations of 152–1,280 m (499–4,199 ft) above sea level. Reproduction has been reported in standing water. It can be common in parts of its range. It is probably suffering the loss of forest habitats, although it appears to tolerate a degree of habitat modification. It is known from a number of protected areas.
