= Papurana milneana =

Conservation status
- Least Concern (IUCN 3.1)

Scientific classification
- Kingdom: Animalia
- Phylum: Chordata
- Class: Amphibia
- Order: Anura
- Family: Ranidae
- Genus: Papurana
- Species: P. milneana

Binomial name
- Papurana milneana (Loveridge, 1948)

Synonyms
- Rana grisea milneana Loveridge, 1948; Rana milneana Loveridge, 1948; Hylarana milneana (Loveridge, 1948)

Species of amphibian

Papurana milneana is a species of "true frog", family Ranidae. It is endemic to Papua New Guinea where it is found in the upland areas of Milne Bay, Morobe, Northern, and Central Provinces, as well from the D'Entrecasteaux Islands and, tentatively, Louisiade Archipelago. It was originally described as a subspecies of Rana grisea (now Papurana grisea), but raised to full-species status in 2007.

== Description ==
Adult males grow to 56 mm (2.2 in) and adult females to 87 mm (3.4 in) in snout–vent length. The snout is acutely pointed. The tympanum is distinct. The fingers have no webbing whereas the toes are webbed to the base of toe discs. The hind limbs are relatively long. Dorsal and lateral surfaces are mostly smooth. Females are dorsally russet or orange brown. There is almost always a clear yellow stripe on the rear of the thigh, contrasting with the chocolate brown ground color. Males are typically dirty brown or tan. The yellow line on the thighs is often short or broken.

The male advertisement call is rather complex and variable. The first part is a series weak clucking sounds, followed by a loud, guttural croaking note.

== Habitat and conservation ==
Papurana milneana occurs in low-elevation and mid-elevation forest streams at elevations up to 800 m (2,600 ft) above sea level. It is nocturnal and most commonly found along the banks and in the stream beds of streams consisting of hard substrates (cobbles, rocks, or boulders), but can occasionally traversing the forest at night, well away from water. Juveniles can also be encountered among streamside cobbles during the day. It adapts to anthropogenic habitats and can be found along somewhat disturbed lowland streams in secondary habitats, among others.

Papurana milneana is a relatively common and adaptable species. It is facing no obvious threats. It is not known to occur in any protected areas.
