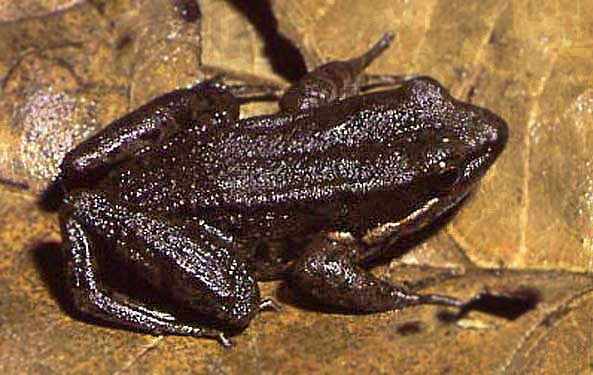
- Sylvirana nigrovittata

Scientific classification
- Kingdom: Animalia
- Phylum: Chordata
- Class: Amphibia
- Order: Anura
- Family: Ranidae
- Genus: Sylvirana; Dubois, 1992

Type species
- Lymnodytes nigrovittatus Blyth, 1855

Species
- 12 species (see text)

Synonyms
- Boulengerana Fei, Ye, and Jiang, 2010

= Sylvirana =

Genus of amphibians

Sylvirana is a genus of true frogs, family Ranidae, found in South and East Asia, from northeastern India in west to China in the north, Taiwan in the east, and Thailand in the south. Originally proposed as a subgenus of Rana in 1992, it has been considered both a full genus and a synonym of Hylarana. Its current recognition at generic level stems from molecular genetic analyses published in 2015.

== Description ==
Sylvirana are generally medium-size frogs with robust bodies. They have similar postocular masks as in Papurana. The upper lip is gray, off-white, or occasionally, mottled. The dorsum is shagreened with spicules, or it can be warty. The dorsolateral folds a medium-sized and well-developed, either pale or the same color as the dorsum. The flanks have dark coloration below lateral ridges that fades to pale with well-defined dark spots. Males have paired vocal sac that may be internal or external.

== Species ==
There are 12 recognized species:

- Sylvirana annamitica Sheridan and Stuart, 2018
- Sylvirana cubitalis (Smith, 1917)
- Sylvirana faber (Ohler, Swan, and Daltry, 2002)
- Sylvirana guentheri (Boulenger, 1882)
- Sylvirana lacrima Sheridan and Stuart, 2018
- Sylvirana malayana Sheridan and Stuart, 2018, PLoS One, 13(3: e0192766):
- Sylvirana maosonensis (Bourret, 1937)
- Sylvirana montosa Sheridan and Stuart, 2018
- Sylvirana mortenseni (Boulenger, 1903)
- Sylvirana nigrovittata (Blyth, 1856)
- Sylvirana roberti Sheridan and Stuart, 2018
- Sylvirana spinulosa (Smith, 1923)
