= Sylvirana lacrima =

Scientific classification
- Kingdom: Animalia
- Phylum: Chordata
- Class: Amphibia
- Order: Anura
- Family: Ranidae
- Genus: Sylvirana
- Species: S. lacrima

Binomial name
- Sylvirana lacrima Sheridan and Stuart, 2018

Species of frog

Sylvirana lacrima, the Chin woodfrog or crying stream frog, is a frog in the family Ranidae. It is endemic to Myanmar. Scientists first saw it near Hteen Chaung Village, 443 meters above sea level.

Scientists consider this frog a sister taxon to Sylvirana nigrovittata.
