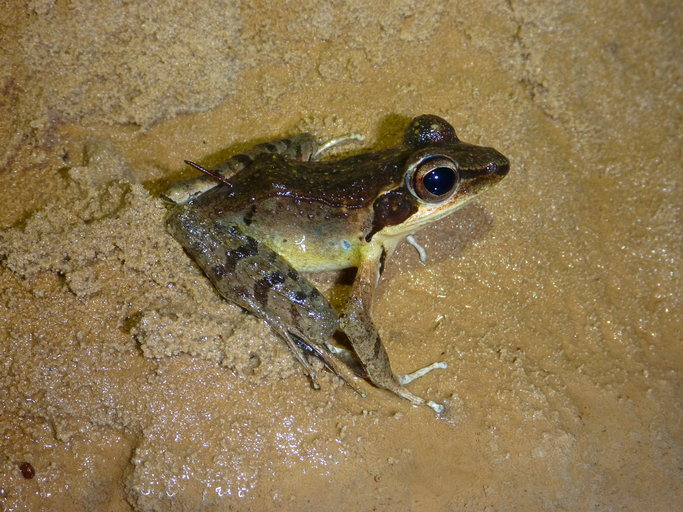

Conservation status
- Least Concern (IUCN 3.1)

Scientific classification
- Kingdom: Animalia
- Phylum: Chordata
- Class: Amphibia
- Order: Anura
- Family: Ranidae
- Genus: Papurana
- Species: P. elberti

Binomial name
- Papurana elberti (Roux, 1911)

Synonyms
- Rana elberti Roux, 1911; Hylarana elberti (Roux, 1911); Sylvirana elberti (Roux, 1911)

= Papurana elberti =

Species of amphibian

Papurana elberti is a species of true frog. It is native to Indonesia and Timor-Leste and found on the islands of Timor and Wetar. The specific name elberti honours Johannes Elbert, a German naturalist who joined an expedition to the Lesser Sunda Islands and Sulawesi in 1910. Common name Lesser Sundas frog has been coined for it.

== Taxonomy ==
Based on molecular data, the previously very diverse genus Hylarana was split in numerous genera in 2015. Molecular data from Papurana elberti was not included in the study, and therefore its placement in Papurana is provisional, pending more morphological and molecular data.

== Conservation ==
Papurana elberti has been assessed by the International Union for Conservation of Nature (IUCN), but the assessment is from 2004 and suggest a broader range than more recent sources.
