= Three-striped frog (disambiguation) =

The three-striped frog is a frog known from southern Thailand and Peninsular Malaysia.

Three-striped frog may also refer to:

- Three-striped grass frog, a frog found in Cambodia, China, Hong Kong, Laos, Malaysia, Myanmar, Thailand, and Vietnam
- Three-striped poison frog, a frog found in Bolivia, Brazil, Colombia, Guyana, Peru, Suriname, Venezuela, and possibly Ecuador and French Guiana
