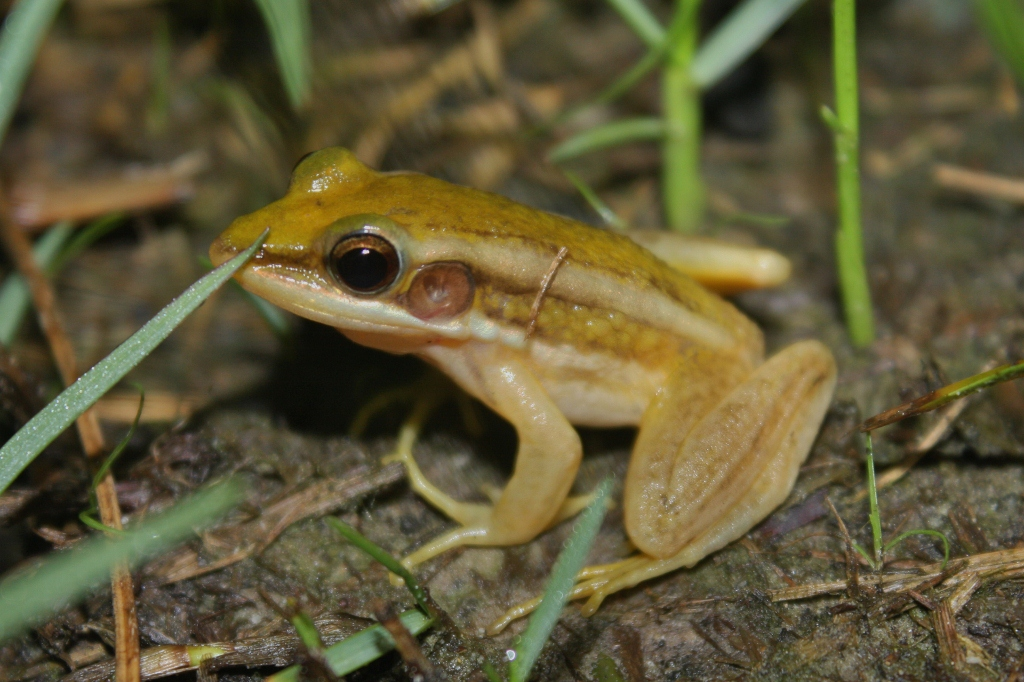

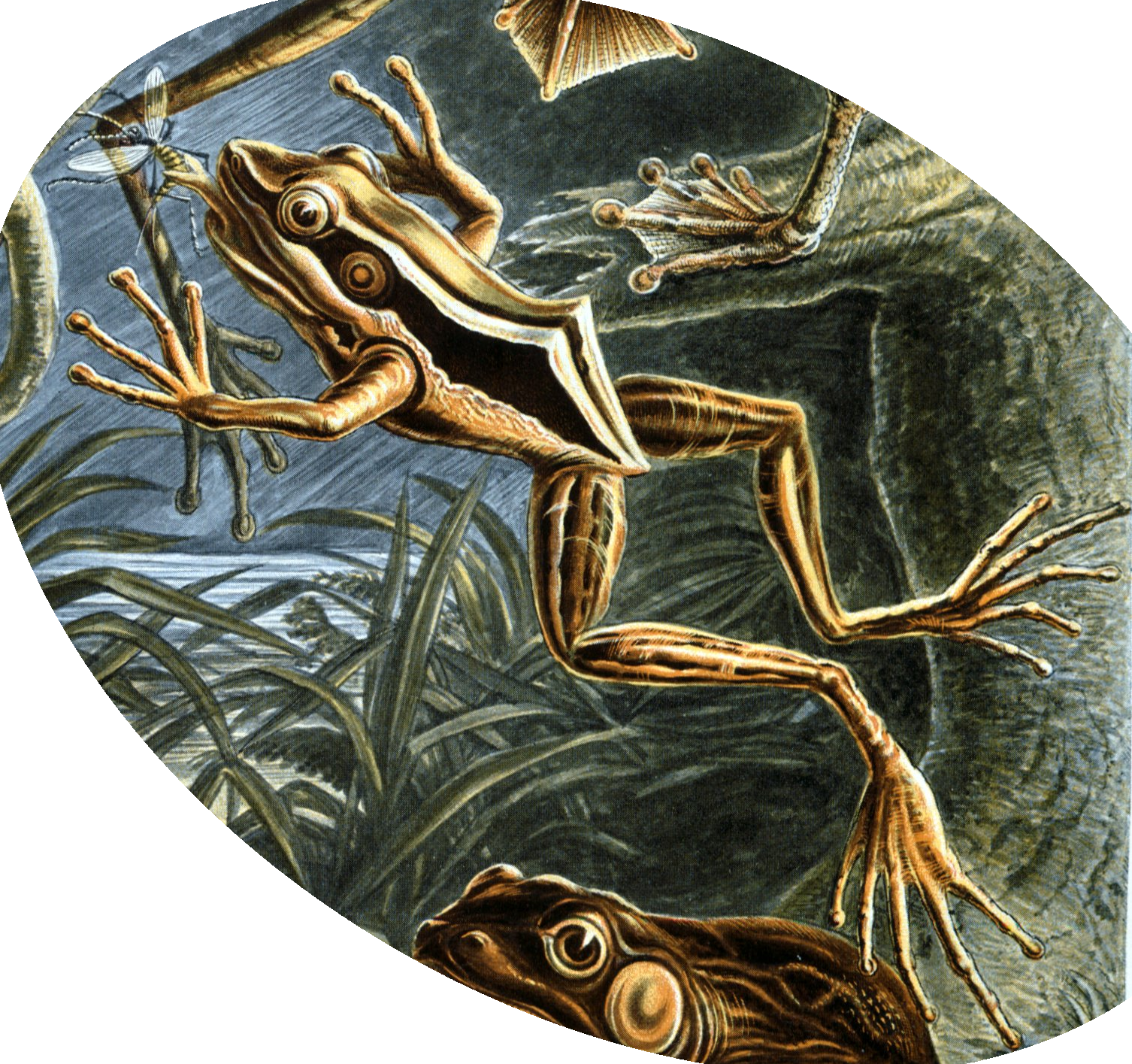
- From Ernst Haeckel's Kunstformen der Natur

Conservation status
- Least Concern (IUCN 3.1)

Scientific classification
- Kingdom: Animalia
- Phylum: Chordata
- Class: Amphibia
- Order: Anura
- Family: Ranidae
- Genus: Hylarana
- Species: H. erythraea

Binomial name
- Hylarana erythraea (Schlegel, 1837)

Synonyms
- Several, see text

= Common green frog =

Species of amphibian

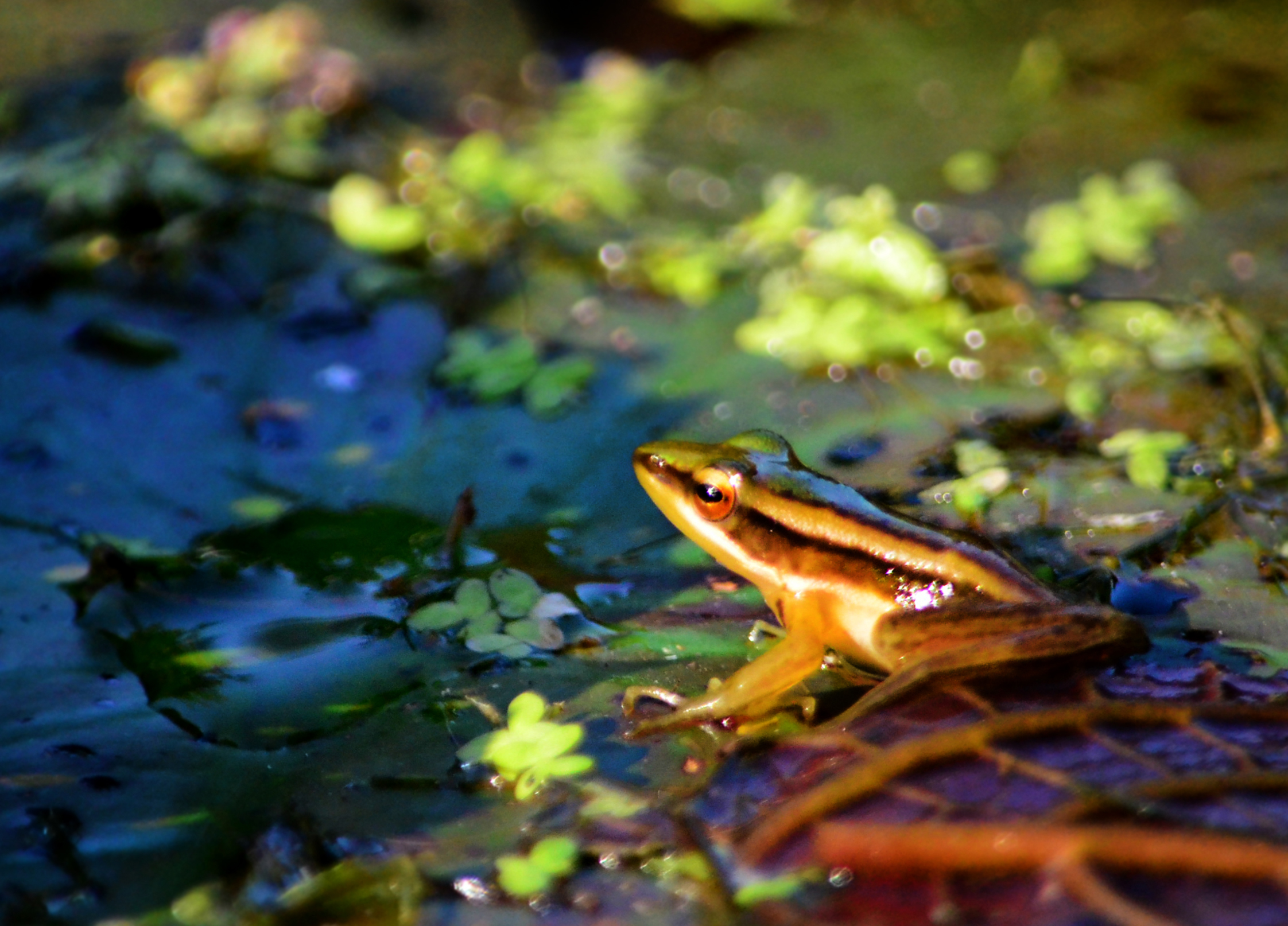
Common green frog on top of lilypads and other bog plants.

The common green frog (Hylarana erythraea) is a frog species of in the true frog family Ranidae; some sources still use the old name Rana erythraea. It lives in Southeast Asia and is also known as green paddy frog, red-eared frog, common greenback or leaf frog. The last name, however, commonly refers to the Neotropical tree frogs which make up the subfamily Phyllomedusinae. These are not closely related to H. erythraea, belonging to family Hylidae instead.

== Taxonomy and systematics ==
Long placed in Rana, it is only as closely related to this genus as is e.g. Amolops. Consequently, the genus Hylarana, of which the common green frog is the type species, warrants re-establishment. Hylarana seems to form a clade together with the similarly revalidated genera Pulchrana and Sylvirana, and presumably also Hydrophylax as well as some species presently placed in Pelophylax (e.g. Kokarit Frog, "P." lateralis).

This frog has confused researchers for a long time, as it resembles tree frogs in habitus. It was initially placed in the tree frog genus Hyla. The junior synonyms of the common green frog are:

- Hyla erythraea Schlegel, 1837
- Hylorana erythraea (lapsus)
- Limnodytes erythraeus (Schlegel, 1837)
- Polypedates erythraea (Schlegel, 1837)
- Rana erythraea (Schlegel, 1837)

== Description ==
Male Hylarana erythraea grow to a snout–vent length of 30–45 mm (1.2–1.8 in) and females to 50–75 mm (2.0–3.0 in). Tadpoles are up to 36 mm (1.4 in) in length. They have smooth skin that is bright green above and on sides. Tympanum is distinct.

== Distribution and ecology ==
H. erythraea occurs in Brunei, Cambodia, Indonesia, Laos, Malaysia, Myanmar, Singapore, Thailand, and Vietnam. It has been observed as high as 1200 meters above sea level. Introduced populations are found on Sulawesi and the Philippines. The similar frogs from northeastern India and adjacent regions, formerly included here, are now separated as Hylarana tytleri.

Its natural habitats are subtropical or tropical moist lowland forests, subtropical or tropical moist montane forests, freshwater lakes, intermittent freshwater lakes, freshwater marshes, intermittent freshwater marshes, rural gardens, heavily degraded former forest, irrigated land, seasonally flooded agricultural land, and introduced vegetation.
