= Papurana supragrisea =

Conservation status
- Least Concern (IUCN 3.1)

Scientific classification
- Kingdom: Animalia
- Phylum: Chordata
- Class: Amphibia
- Order: Anura
- Family: Ranidae
- Genus: Papurana
- Species: P. supragrisea

Binomial name
- Papurana supragrisea (Menzies, 1987)

Synonyms
- Rana supragrisea Menzies, 1987; Sylvirana supragrisea (Menzies, 1987); Hylarana supragrisea (Menzies, 1987)

Species of amphibian

Papurana supragrisea is a species of true frog, family Ranidae. It is endemic to New Guinea, including some nearby islands. It is known with certainty only from southeastern New Guinea and from the D'Entrecasteaux Islands. However, this name has been used more broadly for a species complex that is widely distributed in the mountains of New Guinea. Common name Papua gray frog has been coined for it.

== Description ==
Adult males measure 70–84 mm (2.8–3.3 in) and adult females 76–110 mm (3.0–4.3 in) in snout–vent length. The snout is bluntly rounded. The tympanum is distinct. The fingers have no webbing whereas the toes are webbed to the base of toe discs in all toes except the 4th toe. The hind limbs are relatively long. Dorsal skin on the posterior of the body and hind limbs has numerous small, white-tipped asperities. There are thick dorso-lateral ridges. Most specimens have nearly uniform dorsal colour. Females have more often lighter colouration (light brown with a cast of russet or tan) than males that are predominantly darker (brown or olive, occasionally greenish yellow or brown mottled with greenish yellow). There is variable amount of dark blotching on the sides. A dark loreal stripe and post-ocular mask is present.

A Gosner stage 25 tadpole has a total length of 48 mm (1.9 in), of which the tail makes 18 mm (0.7 in).

== Habitat and conservation ==
Papurana supragrisea—broadly defined—occurs in tropical rainforest, rural gardens, villages, and degraded habitats at elevations of 100–1,800 m (330–5,910 ft) above sea level. It lives in moderate to fast-flowing streams where it also breeds. It is an abundant species that is not facing significant threats, even though it is captured for human consumption. It occurs in some protected areas.
