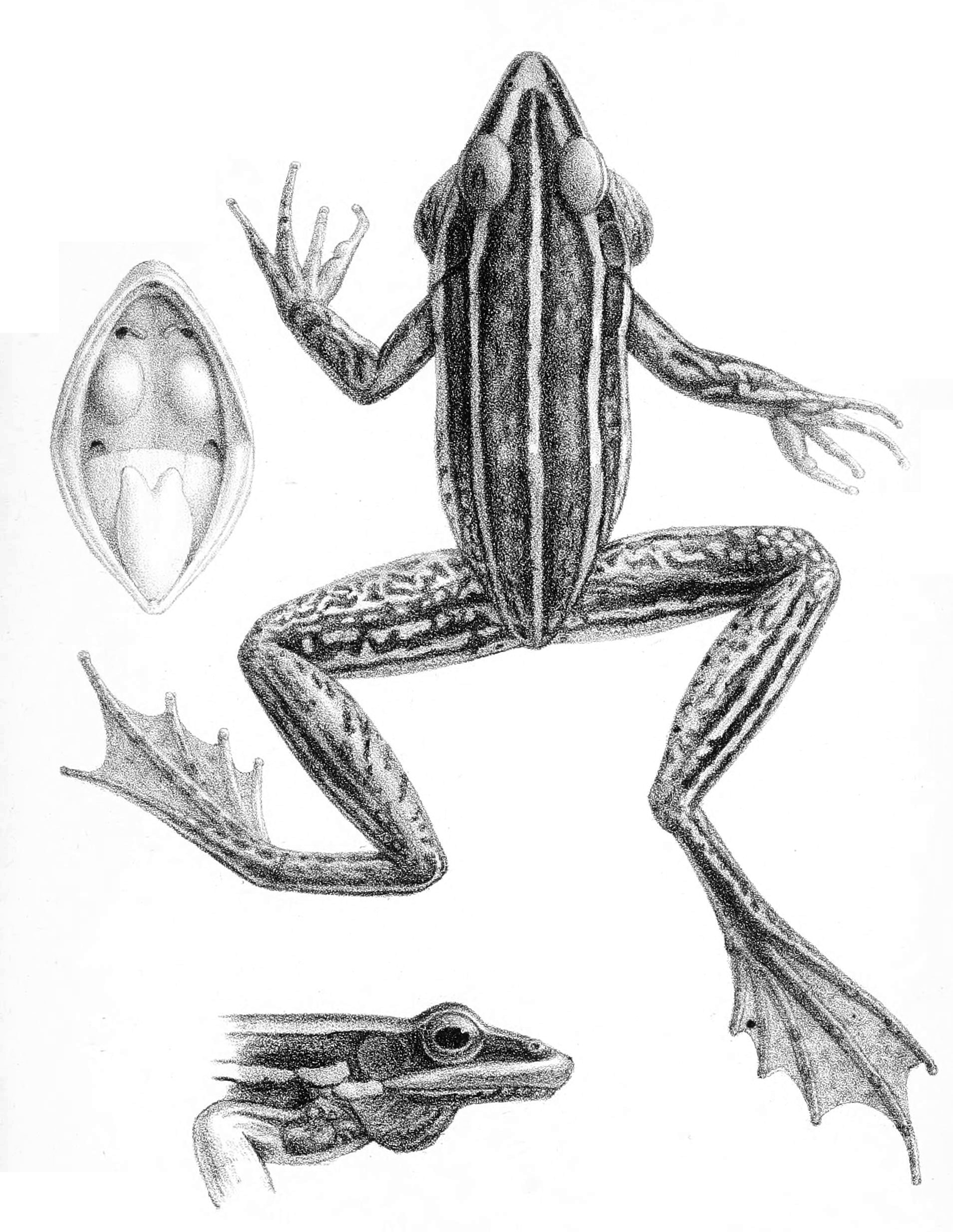

Conservation status
- Data Deficient (IUCN 3.1)

Scientific classification
- Kingdom: Animalia
- Phylum: Chordata
- Class: Amphibia
- Order: Anura
- Family: Ranidae
- Genus: Humerana
- Species: H. oatesii

Binomial name
- Humerana oatesii (Boulenger, 1892)

Synonyms
- Rana Oatesii Boulenger, 1892; Hylarana oatesii (Boulenger, 1892)

= Humerana oatesii =

Species of frog

Humerana oatesii is a species of frog in the family Ranidae. It is endemic to Burma. This species is only known from type series collected from "near Toungoo" in the Pegu Range. The specific name oatesii honours Eugene W. Oates, English civil servant and naturalist who collected the type series. However, the common name Toungoo frog has been proposed for it.

== Description ==
The type series consists of two males and two females. The males measure 63–80 mm (2.5–3.1 in) and the females 50–78 mm (2.0–3.1 in) in snout–vent length. The head is longer than it is wide and strongly dorsoventrally compressed. The snout is pointed and long. The tympanum is very distinct. The fingers are long with poorly developed discs. The toes have very small discs and almost full webbing. Skin is dorsally finely granulate. A prominent dorsolater fold runs from the tympanum to the hip. Dorsal colouration is black (uniform or marbled with pale brown) with five whitish lengthwise streaks. The lower parts are white, possibly spotted with brown. Males have large paired vocal sacs.

== Habitat and conservation ==
The specific habitat requirements of this species are unknown, but the larvae are presumed to be aquatic. Despite surveys at the type locality, there are no records of this species after the collection of the type series. The main threats to it are extensive wildfires and logging in the Pegu Range.
