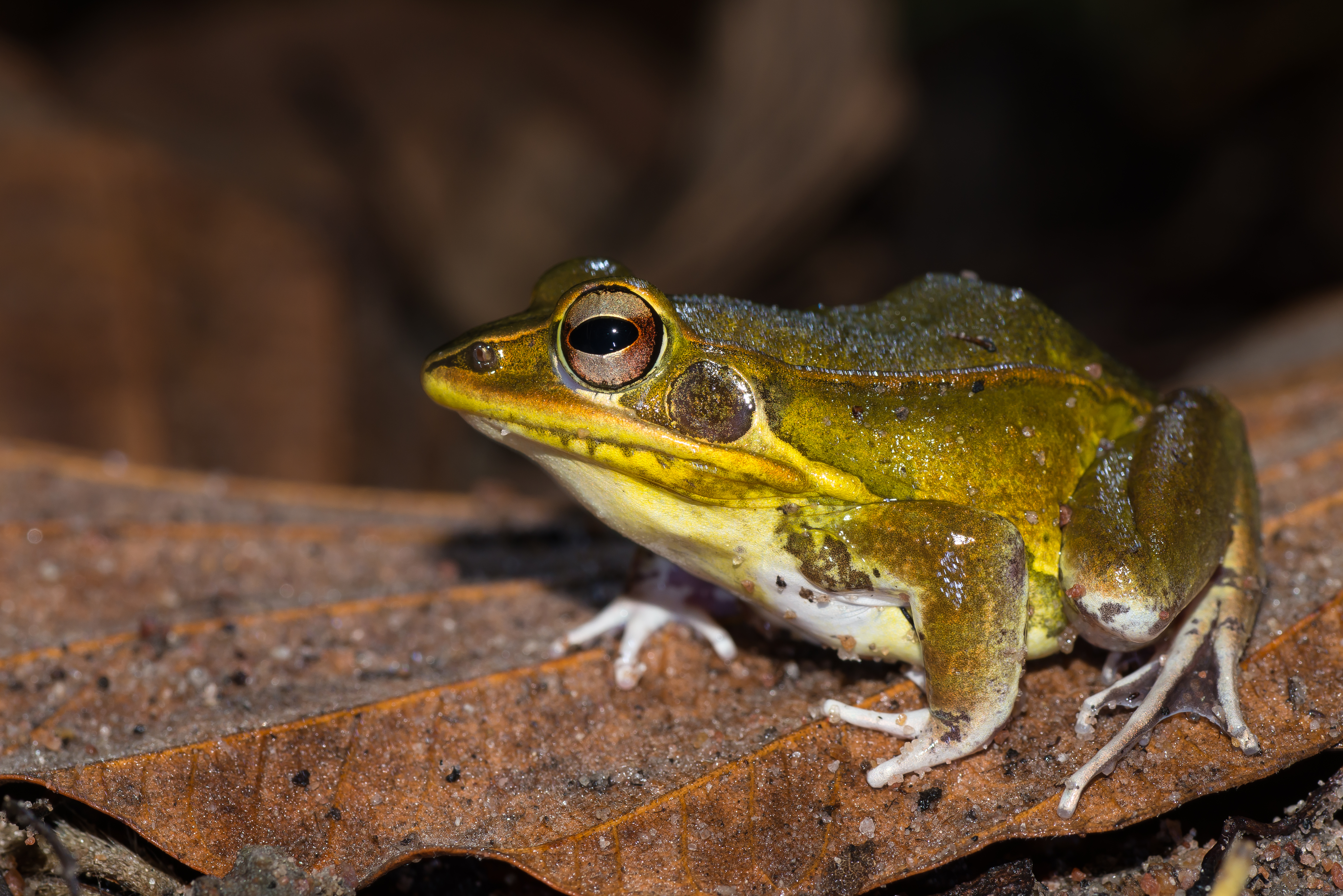
- Kokarit frog (H. lateralis)

Scientific classification
- Kingdom: Animalia
- Phylum: Chordata
- Class: Amphibia
- Order: Anura
- Family: Ranidae
- Genus: Humerana; Dubois, 1992

Type species
- Rana humeralis Boulenger, 1887

Species
- See text

= Humerana =

Genus of amphibians

Humerana is a genus of frogs in the family Ranidae from southern and southeastern Asia. It was originally proposed as a subgenus of Rana. It may belong to Hylarana.

Humerana contains the following species:

- Humerana humeralis (Boulenger, 1887)
- Humerana lateralis (Boulenger, 1887)
- Humerana miopus (Boulenger, 1918)
- Humerana oatesii (Boulenger, 1892)
