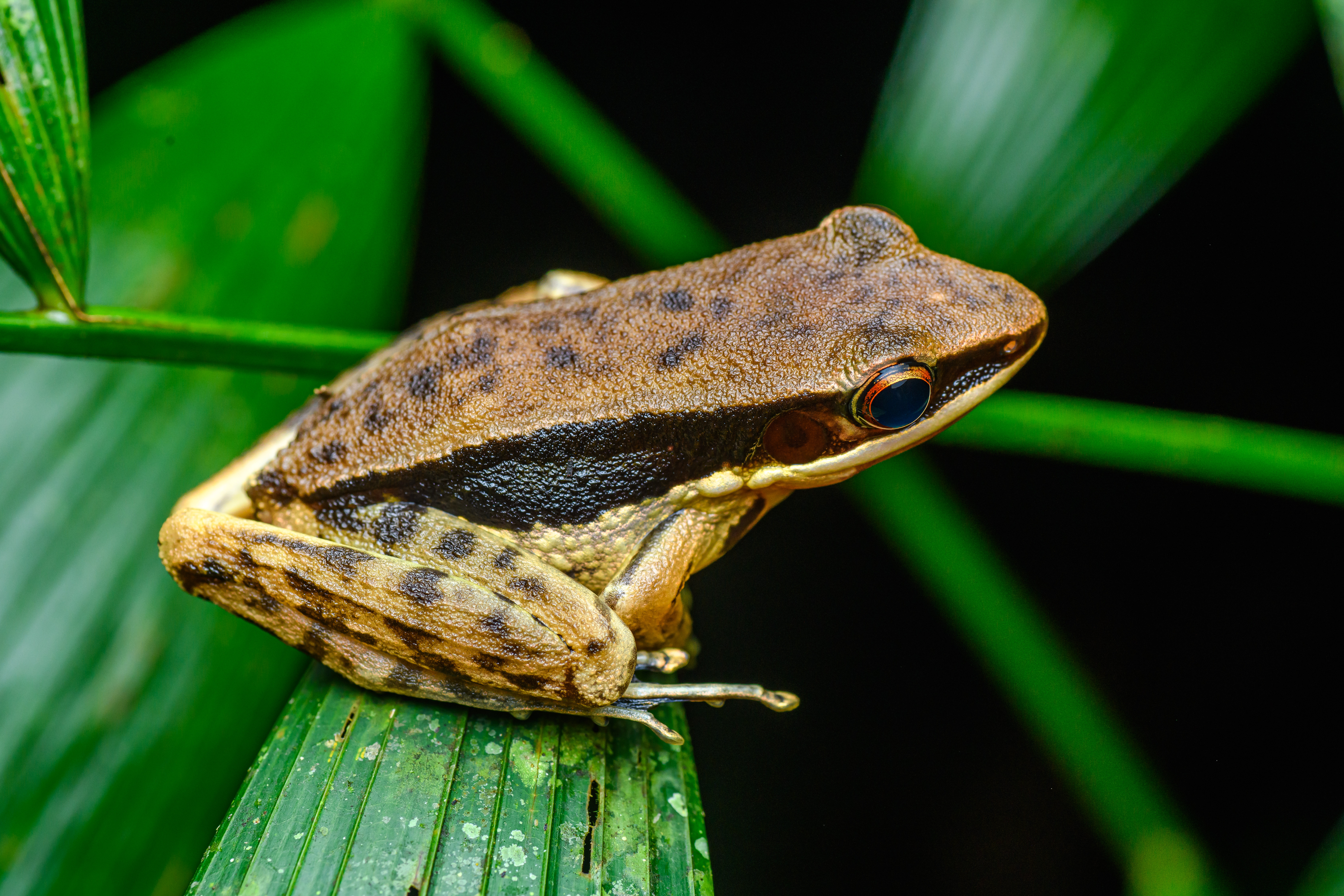

Scientific classification
- Kingdom: Animalia
- Phylum: Chordata
- Class: Amphibia
- Order: Anura
- Family: Ranidae
- Genus: Hylarana
- Species: H. malayana

Binomial name
- Hylarana malayana (Sheridan and Stuart, 2018)

Synonyms
- Sylvirana malayana Sheridan and Stuart, 2018

= Hylarana malayana =

Species of frog

Hylarana malayana, the Malaya stream frog, Malay woodfrog, or Malayan dark-side frog, is a frog in the family Ranidae. It is endemic to Myanmar and India.

Scientists consider this frog a sister taxon to Sylvirana nigrovittata.

The adult male frog measures 42.2–48.8 mm in snout-vent length and the adult female frog 47.2–56.8 mm. This frog is medium-brown in color with small dark spots. Its lips are white. It has a wide, dark stripe down each side of its body, from nose to groin. Its belly is white.

This frog has vomerine teeth in its jaw and disks on its toes for climbing. The adult male frog has more robust front legs than the adult female frog.

The scientists who wrote the first paper about this frog named it malayana because it is the only species among its close relatives that lives in Peninsular Malaysia.
