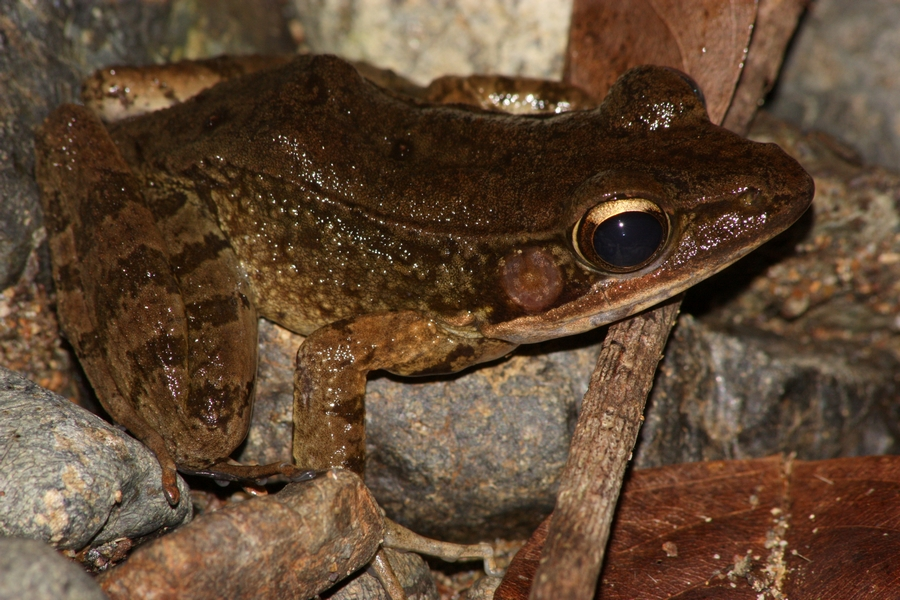

Conservation status
- Least Concern (IUCN 3.1)

Scientific classification
- Kingdom: Animalia
- Phylum: Chordata
- Class: Amphibia
- Order: Anura
- Family: Ranidae
- Genus: Papurana
- Species: P. waliesa

Binomial name
- Papurana waliesa (Kraus and Allison, 2007)

Synonyms
- Rana waliesa Kraus and Allison, 2007; Hylarana waliesa (Kraus and Allison, 2007)

= Papurana waliesa =

Species of amphibian

Papurana waliesa is a species of "true frogs", family Ranidae. It is endemic to Papua New Guinea where it is found in the southern Owen Stanley Range and the Pini Range in the eastern New Guinea as well as in the D'Entrecasteaux Islands (Fergusson, Goodenough, and Normanby islands). The specific name waliesa is derived from the Dobu word waliesa that means "namesake", in honor of Fred Malesa from Fergusson Island. He had greatly assisted the describers of this species during their expedition in the Milne Bay Province.

== Description ==
Adult males grow to 77 mm (3.0 in) and adult females to 81 mm (3.2 in) in snout–vent length. The snout is acutely pointed in dorsal view and truncated with the lower half recessed when viewed laterally. The tympanum is distinct. The fingers have no webbing but have flattened and expanded tips. The toes are almost completely webbed and have pointed tips bearing discs. The dorsum and legs are densely covered by conical asperities. There is a thick dorso-lateral ridge running from the eye backward. The dorsum is olive green and is freckled with darker olive flecks. The sides have dark flecks that contrast with the yellow background; the yellow color gets more dominating the lower down. The chin and throat are white some high-contrast mottling or clouding of melanin, except for the vocal sac in males that is heavily stippled with melanin.

A tadpole at Gosner stage 34 measures 44 mm (1.7 in) in total length.

The male advertisement call consists of 3–8 somewhat "raspy" nasal notes, emitted at a mean rate of about four notes per second.

== Habitat and conservation ==
Papurana waliesa is an uncommon species associated with slow- and faster-flowing streams, ditches, and Pandanus swamps, in disturbed grassy habitats and villages. It is found up to 600 m (2,000 ft) above sea level.

Papurana waliesa can adapt to certain anthropogenic habitats, but it has a small range and is found in low numbers. Moreover, it is restricted to elevations that are under moderate to heavy human disturbance.
