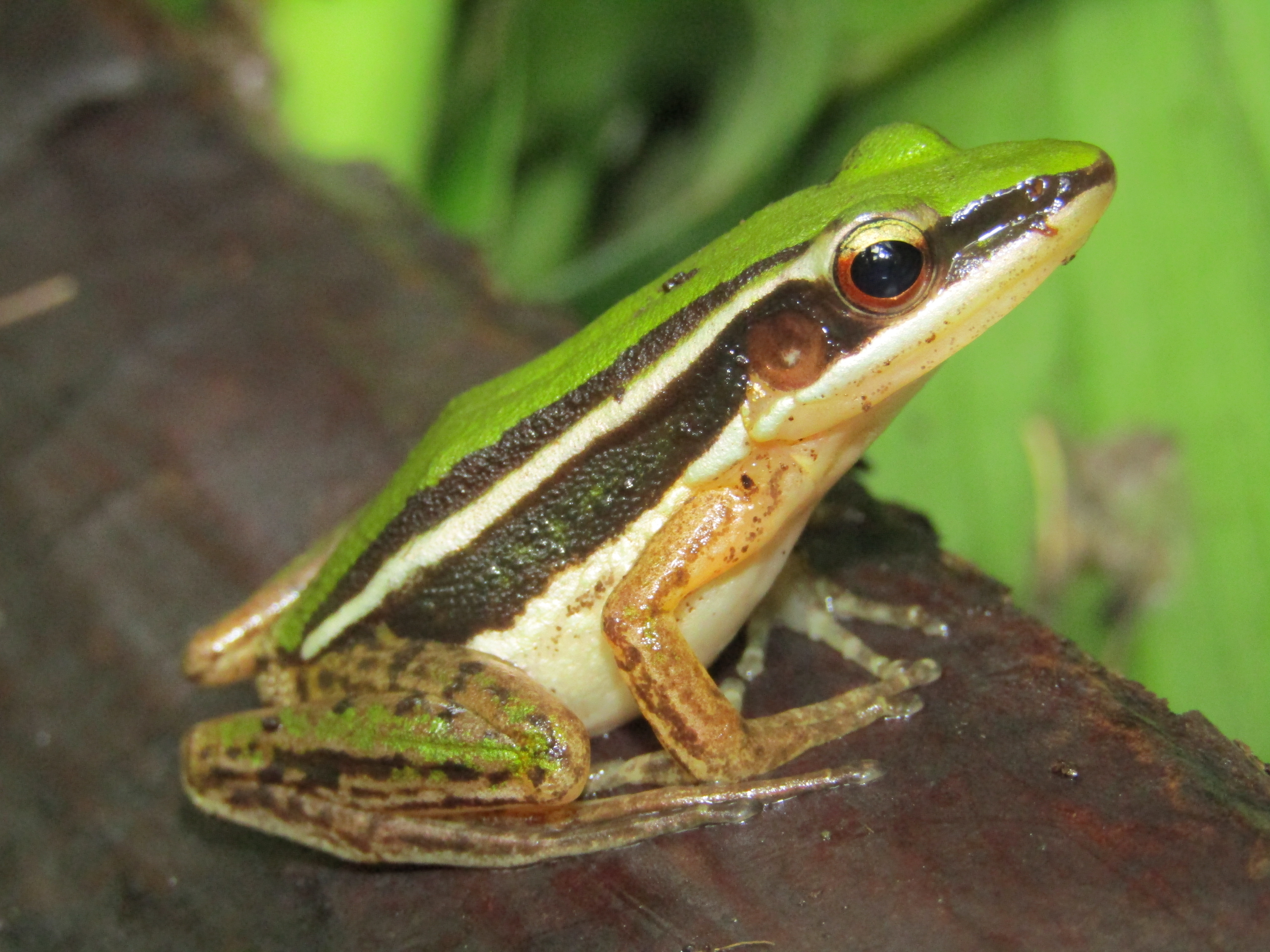

Conservation status
- Least Concern (IUCN 3.1)

Scientific classification
- Kingdom: Animalia
- Phylum: Chordata
- Class: Amphibia
- Order: Anura
- Family: Ranidae
- Genus: Hylarana
- Species: H. tytleri

Binomial name
- Hylarana tytleri Theobald, 1868

Synonyms
- Hylorana tytleri Theobald, 1868; Rana tytleri (Theobald, 1868); Rana (Rana) bilineata Pillai and Chanda, 1981; Rana (Hylarana) albolineata Dubois, 1987 "1985"

= Hylarana tytleri =

Species of amphibian

Hylarana tytleri is a frog species in the family Ranidae. It is found in eastern and northeastern India, Myanmar, Bangladesh, and southern Nepal, and possibly at lower elevations in Bhutan. It was formerly placed in Rana, and included in the common green frog (H. erythraea). It is probably a close relative of that species nonetheless, and thus placed in the revalidated genus Hylarana, of which H. erythraea is the type species. Common name Theobald's ranid frog has been coined for it, although common names for Indian frogs previously identified as Rana erythraea include yellow-striped frog, leaf frog, and leaping frog.

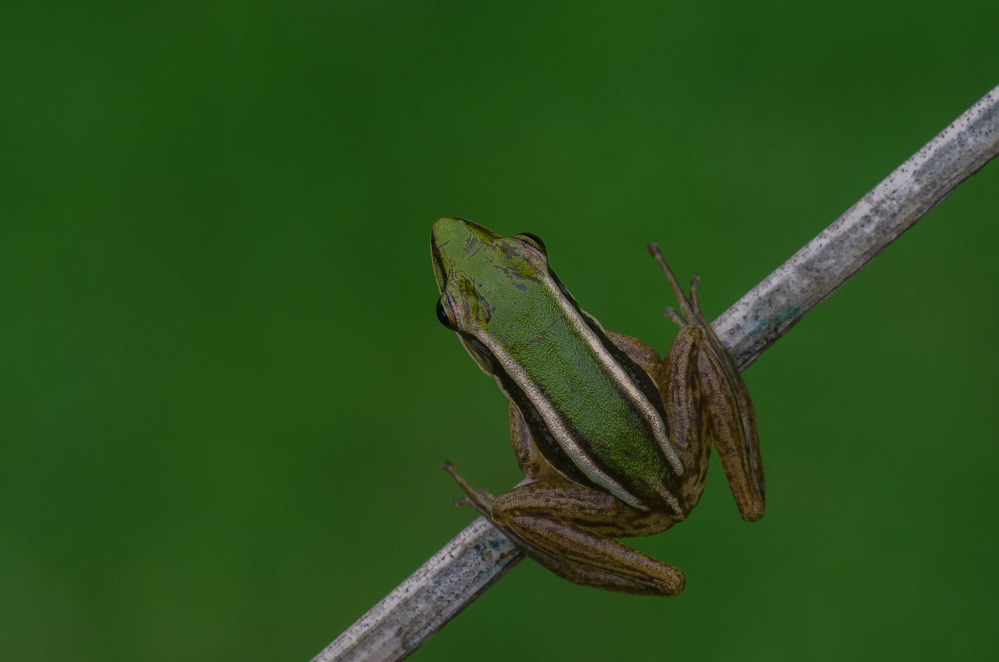
Dorsal view

== Description ==
Males grow to a maximum size of 33 mm (1.3 in) and females to 45 mm (1.8 in) in snout–vent length (SVL). The head is moderately elongated. The shanks are relatively long (about 55% of SVL). Webbing is partial. The body is uniformly greenish with two whitish or yellow lines laterally on back. There are two distinct brown lines on inner side of latero-dorsal folds. No mid-dorsal line is present.

== Habitat and conservation ==
Hylarana tytleri is a lowland (below 300 m (980 ft) above sea level) species associated with a variety of aquatic habitats including pools, lakes, marshes, and artificially flooded agricultural areas. It may venture into bank side vegetation and into scrubland and tropical forest habitats. It is a common species, but water pollution with agrochemicals can be a threat. It may also suffer locally from over-collection for food. It is not considered a threatened species by the IUCN.
