= Papurana arfaki =

Conservation status
- Least Concern (IUCN 3.1)

Scientific classification
- Kingdom: Animalia
- Phylum: Chordata
- Class: Amphibia
- Order: Anura
- Family: Ranidae
- Genus: Papurana
- Species: P. arfaki

Binomial name
- Papurana arfaki (Meyer, 1875)

Synonyms
- Rana arfaki Meyer, 1875 "1874"; Hylarana arfaki (Meyer, 1875); Sylvirana arfaki (Meyer, 1875); Rana macroscelis Boulenger, 1888; Rana waigeënsis Van Kampen, 1913; Rana fallax Van Kampen, 1913

Species of amphibian

Papurana arfaki is a species of true frog, family Ranidae. It is widely distributed in New Guinea (in both Western New Guinea and Papua New Guinea) and also found on the Aru Islands (Indonesia). Common names Arfak Mountains frog and large river-frog have been coined for it. Its type locality is the Arfak Mountains.

== Description ==
Adult males measure at least 69 mm (2.7 in) and adult females 86 mm (3.4 in) in snout–vent length; they can reach 150 mm (5.9 in) or more. The snout is rounded. The head is as long as it is wide or slightly longer. The toes are fully webbed, and both the fingers and the toes have grooved terminal discs. Skin is very warty in juveniles and in adult males, very rugose in adult females. Continuous dorso-lateral folds are not present. Dorsal colouration is plain dark brown, sometimes mottled with white. The ventrum is white mottled with brown on the throat.

The male advertisement call is a squeaky note, uttered singly or in short series.

== Habitat and conservation ==
Papurana arfaki lives in rivers and (to a lesser extent) streams in lowland rainforest, usually in mature forest, at elevations up to 1,500 m (4,900 ft) above sea level. It breeds in the same rivers and streams. It is a common species that is consumed locally in large numbers. However, the overall population is believed to be stable, and it occurs in several protected areas.
