= Sylvirana spinulosa =

Conservation status
- Vulnerable (IUCN 3.1)

Scientific classification
- Kingdom: Animalia
- Phylum: Chordata
- Class: Amphibia
- Order: Anura
- Family: Ranidae
- Genus: Sylvirana
- Species: S. spinulosa

Binomial name
- Sylvirana spinulosa (Smith, 1923)

Synonyms
- Rana spinulosa Smith, 1923; Hylarana spinulosa (Smith, 1923)

Species of amphibian

Hylarana spinulosa, also known as fine-spined frog and spiny frog, is a species of true frog, family Ranidae. It is endemic to Hainan, southern China. It occurs in tropical forests at elevations of 80–840 m (260–2,760 ft) above sea level. Breeding takes place in pools and slow-flowing streams.

Hylarana spinulosa are medium-sized frogs: males grow to a snout–vent length of 40 mm (1.6 in) and females to 52 mm (2.0 in). Tadpoles are up to 37 mm (1.5 in) in length.
