= Eugene W. Oates =

English naturalist and civil engineer

Eugene William Oates
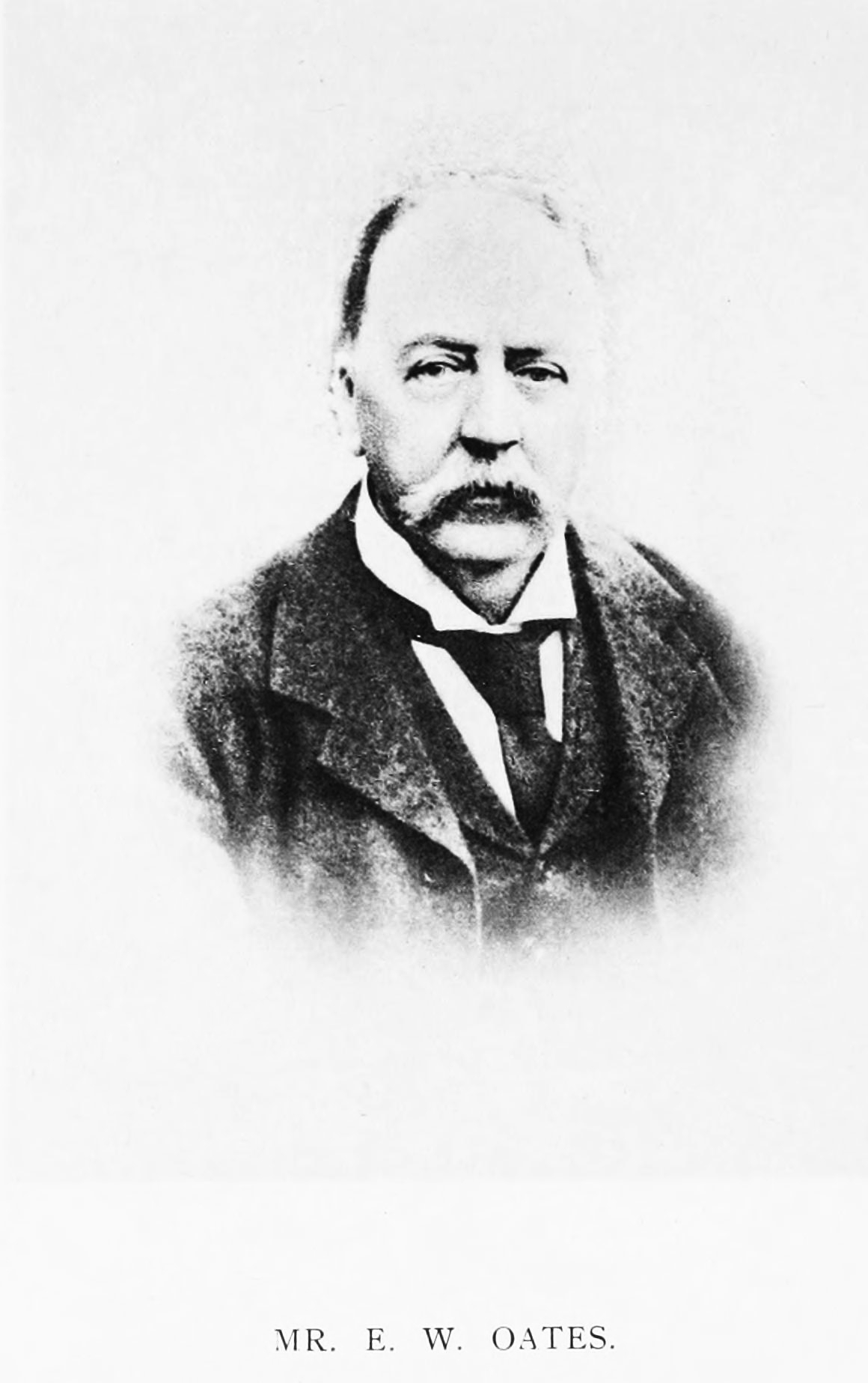
- Oates in 1908
- Born: 31 December 1845; Sicily, Italy
- Died: 16 November 1911 (aged 65); Edgbaston, England
- Education: Sydney College, Bath
- Occupation: Ornithologist

Eugene William Oates (31 December 1845 – 16 November 1911) was an English naturalist and a civil engineer who worked on road projects in Burma.

Oates was born in Sicily and educated in Bath, England. For a time he attended Sydney College, Bath and later under private tutors. He was a civil servant in the Public Works Department in India and Burma from 1867 to 1899. He retired to England, where he compiled a catalogue of the birds' eggs in the Natural History Museum, and served as secretary of the British Ornithologists' Union from 1898 to 1901.

He died in Edgbaston.

A species of Indian snake, Typhlops oatesii, a Burmese frog, Humerana oatesii, and seven species of birds are named in his honour.

== Publications ==
- Oates, E.W. (1883). A handbook to the birds of British Burmah including those found in the adjoining state of Karennee. Vol II. London: R.H. Porter.
- Oates, E.W. (1888). "On the Indian and Burmese Scorpions of the Genus Isometrus, with Description of Three new Species". Journal of the Bombay Natural History Society 3: 244–250.
- Oates, E.W. (1889–1890). The Fauna of British India, Including Ceylon and Burma. Birds.—Vol. I & II. London: Secretary of State for India in Council. (Taylor & Francis, printers).
- Oates, E.W. (1899). A manual of the Game Birds of India. Vol. II, pp. 139–146. Bombay: Cambridge.
