= Papurana novaeguineae =

Conservation status
- Least Concern (IUCN 3.1)

Scientific classification
- Kingdom: Animalia
- Phylum: Chordata
- Class: Amphibia
- Order: Anura
- Family: Ranidae
- Genus: Papurana
- Species: P. novaeguineae

Binomial name
- Papurana novaeguineae (van Kampen, 1909)

Synonyms
- Rana novaeguineae van Kampen, 1909; Sylvirana novaeguineae (van Kampen, 1909); Hylarana novaeguineae (van Kampen, 1909)

Species of amphibian

Papurana novaeguineae is a species of true frog, family Ranidae. It is endemic to southern New Guinea and occurs between Lake Yamur (West Papua, Indonesia) and Purari River (Papua New Guinea). Common name New Guinea frog has been coined for it.

== Description ==
Papurana novaeguineae is the smallest Papurana species in New Guinea: males reach maturity below 36 mm (1.4 in) and females below 43 mm (1.7 in) in snout–vent length; these lengths have also been interpreted as the maximum sizes. Although it could be mixed with juveniles of other species, P. novaeguineae is easy to distinguish from its relatives because it has reduced webbing between the toes: the fourth toe has the last two phalanges free of webbing (one free phalanx or none in other species). The nostrils are relatively widely separated.

The male advertisement call is a short series of pulsed notes with a "ringing" quality. The dominant frequency is about 3 kHz.

== Habitat and conservation ==
Papurana novaeguineae occurs in tropical flooded savannas and foothill rainforests at elevations up to 500 m (1,600 ft) above sea level. It is locally abundant. Breeding takes place in permanent swamps and temporary grassy flooded ditches. No significant threats to this species have been identified. It occurs in several protected areas.
