= Papurana jimiensis =

Conservation status
- Least Concern (IUCN 3.1)

Scientific classification
- Kingdom: Animalia
- Phylum: Chordata
- Class: Amphibia
- Order: Anura
- Family: Ranidae
- Genus: Papurana
- Species: P. jimiensis

Binomial name
- Papurana jimiensis (Tyler, 1963)

Synonyms
- Rana jimiensis Tyler, 1963; Hylarana jimiensis (Tyler, 1963); Sylvirana jimiensis (Tyler, 1963)

Species of amphibian

Papurana jimiensis is a species of true frog. It is endemic to the mountains of central and western New Guinea in both Indonesia and Papua New Guinea. The common name Jimi River frog has been coined for it.

It inhabits mountain streams and nearby areas, and can also be found in degraded habitats. Its altitudinal range is 700–1,700 m (2,300–5,600 ft) above sea level. It has been observed near the Jimi River, Sepik River, and Ramu River.

Papurana jimiensis is an uncommon species, although it is under-recorded. It is collected for food, but this probably does not constitute a threat, as long as collection is for local consumption only. It occurs in the Jimi River Wildlife Management Area.
