= Papurana garritor =

Conservation status
- Least Concern (IUCN 3.1)

Scientific classification
- Kingdom: Animalia
- Phylum: Chordata
- Class: Amphibia
- Order: Anura
- Family: Ranidae
- Genus: Papurana
- Species: P. garritor

Binomial name
- Papurana garritor (Menzies, 1987)

Synonyms
- Rana garritor Menzies, 1987; Hylarana garritor (Menzies, 1987); Sylvirana garritor (Menzies, 1987)

Species of frog

Papurana garritor is a species of frog in the family Ranidae. It is endemic to New Guinea and widely distributed, found in both Indonesian and Papua New Guinean parts of the island. Common name Eilogo Estate frog has been coined for it.

== Description ==
Adult males grow to 72 mm (2.8 in) and adult females to 79 mm (3.1 in) in snout–vent length. The snout is pointed and projecting. The tympanum is distinct and relatively larger in males than in females. The fingers have no webbing whereas the toes are almost completely webbed. Skin of the dorsum and legs is smooth to finely granular with dermal asperities. The dorsum is uniform brown or brown-gray; the sides are also uniform, dusted or clouded with gray or brown on white or yellow background. Dark face mask and loreal stripes are absent. A continuous dorso-lateral line is sometimes present.

The male advertisement call is loud and consists of a rapid sequence of 6–15 pulsed notes, having some machine gun like quality.

== Habitat and conservation ==
The species' natural habitats are tropical rainforests at elevations up to 1,500 m (4,900 ft) above sea level. It is associated with streams, its breeding habitat. It can be found on the forest floor as well as perched on vegetation near streams. It is an abundant species. It can be locally threatened by loss of its forest habitat. It is also collected for food, but probably not at levels that would constitute a threat. It is found in several protected areas.
