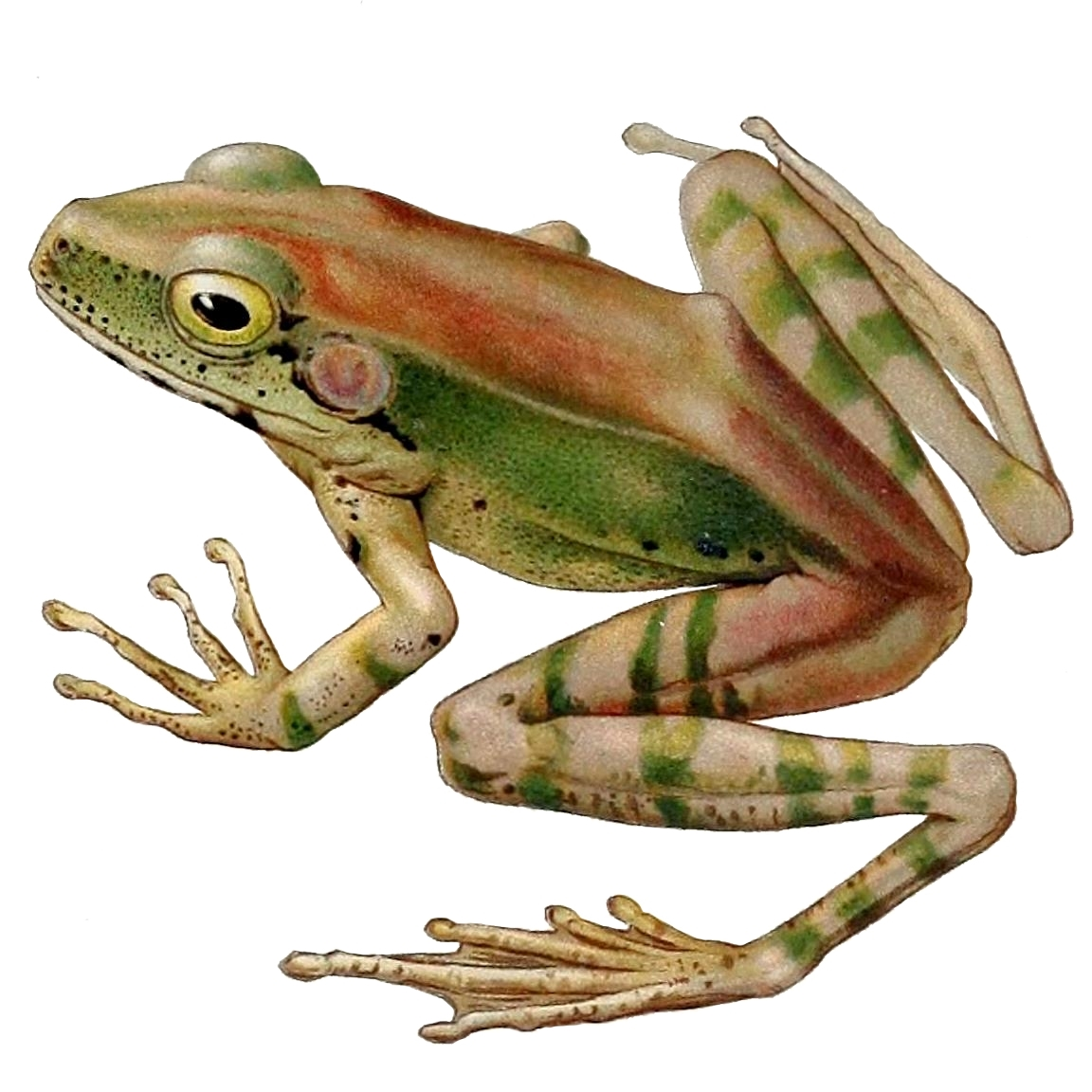

Conservation status
- Least Concern (IUCN 3.1)

Scientific classification
- Kingdom: Animalia
- Phylum: Chordata
- Class: Amphibia
- Order: Anura
- Family: Ranidae
- Genus: Papurana
- Species: P. papua

Binomial name
- Papurana papua (Lesson, 1830)

Synonyms
- Rana papua Lesson, 1830; Hylarana papua (Lesson, 1830)

= Papurana papua =

Species of amphibian

Papurana papua is a species of true frog, family Ranidae. It is endemic to New Guinea and found in the northern part of the island in both Indonesia and Papua New Guinea as well in some offshore islands (including Normanby, Waigeo, and Manus Island). Common name Papua frog has been coined for it.

== Description ==
Papurana papua is a comparatively small frog. Adult males grow to 60 mm (2.4 in) and adult females to 67 mm (2.6 in) in snout–vent length; mean length is respectively 56 and 64 mm (2.2 and 2.5 in). The limbs are short, giving this frog an oddly elongated appearance. The upper lip is white and contrasts with the surrounding dark ground color. As typical for the genus, dark post-ocular mask is present, but it is not clearly demarcated posteriorly. The sides have low-contrast pattern of brown clouded over white, gray, or faint yellow. The venter is white or with faint, dark yellow cast, evenly suffused with dark punctations or gray clouding. The dorsum is smooth or finely granular and has few, scattered, large, dark brown warts.

The male advertisement call is a single pulsed note, sounding like a "quack".

== Habitat and conservation ==
Papurana papua lives in swampy forests and flooded grasslands, including disturbed habitats, at elevations up to 1,200 m (3,900 ft) above sea level. Breeding takes place in pools and swamps. It is an abundant and widely distributed species. No significant threats to it are known. It lives in some protected areas.
