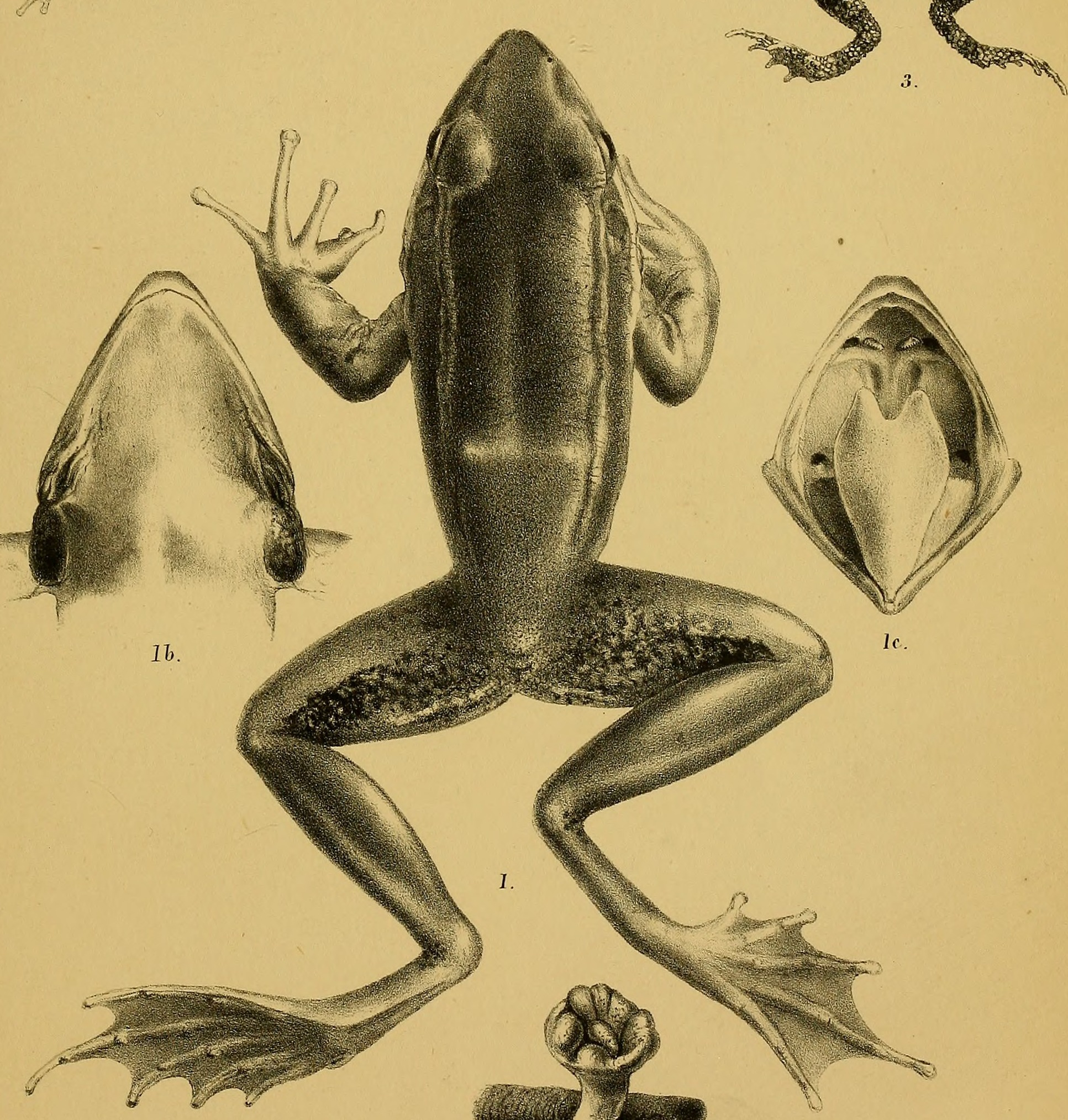

Conservation status
- Least Concern (IUCN 3.1)

Scientific classification
- Kingdom: Animalia
- Phylum: Chordata
- Class: Amphibia
- Order: Anura
- Family: Ranidae
- Genus: Humerana
- Species: H. humeralis

Binomial name
- Humerana humeralis (Boulenger, 1887)

Synonyms
- Rana humeralis Boulenger, 1887

= Humerana humeralis =

Species of frog

Humerana humeralis is a species of frog in the family Ranidae. It is found in Bangladesh, India, Myanmar, Nepal, and possibly Bhutan. Its natural habitats are subtropical or tropical moist lowland forests and rivers. It is threatened by habitat loss.
