= Papurana milleti =

Millet's frog

Conservation status
- Least Concern (IUCN 3.1)

Scientific classification
- Kingdom: Animalia
- Phylum: Chordata
- Class: Amphibia
- Order: Anura
- Family: Ranidae
- Genus: Papurana
- Species: P. milleti

Binomial name
- Papurana milleti (Smith, 1921)

Synonyms
- Rana milleti Smith, 1921; Indosylvirana milleti (Smith, 1921); Rana bannanica Rao and Yang, 1997

Species of amphibian

Papurana milleti (Millet's frog or Dalat frog) is a species of true frog. Originally described in the genus Rana, then Hylarana and Indosylvirana, it is now placed in Papurana. It is native to Cambodia, China (Yunnan), Thailand, Vietnam, and quite possibly Laos. It is a locally common frog found by ponds and streams in seasonal tropical forests.
