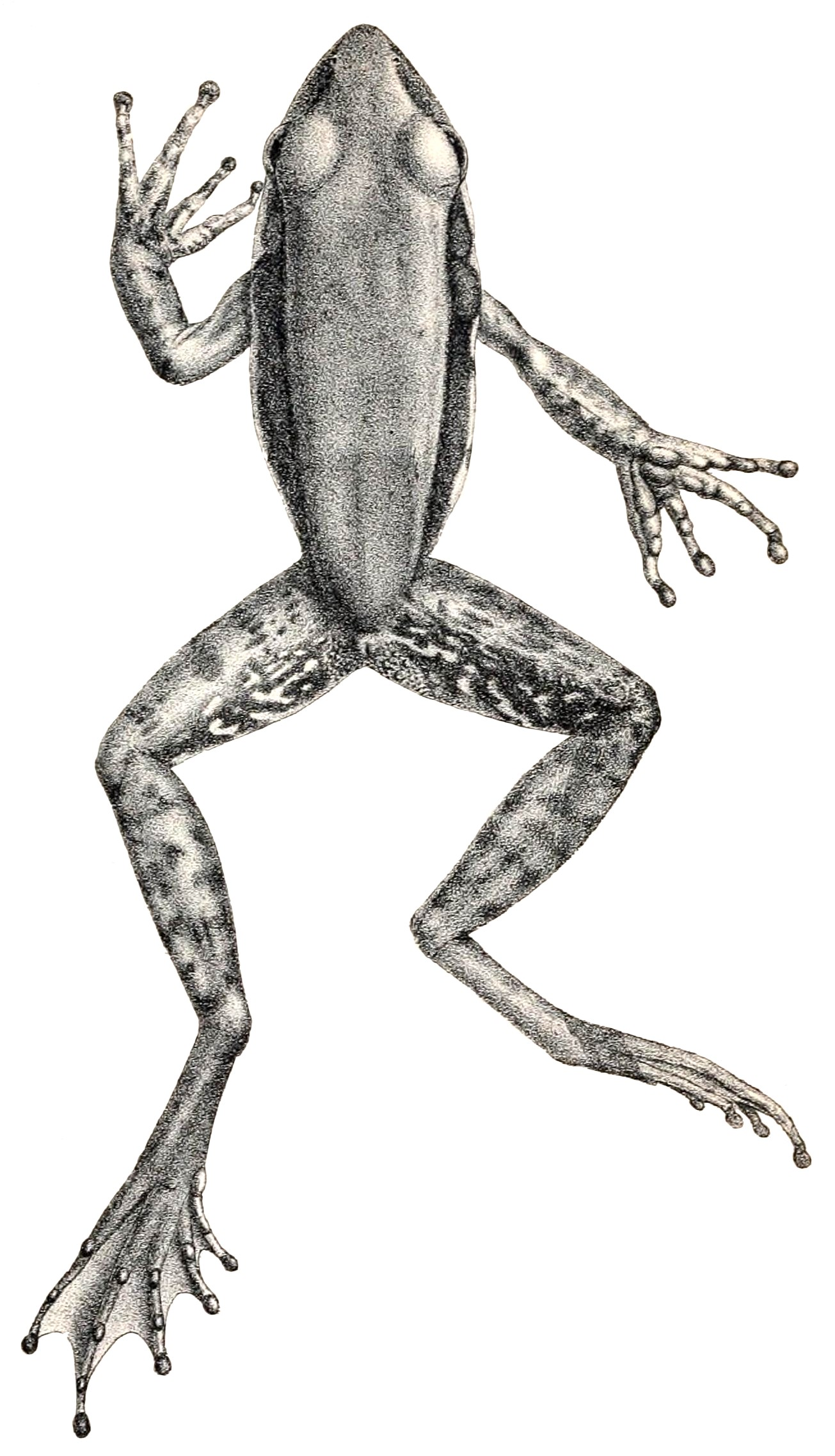

Conservation status
- Least Concern (IUCN 3.1)

Scientific classification
- Kingdom: Animalia
- Phylum: Chordata
- Class: Amphibia
- Order: Anura
- Family: Ranidae
- Genus: Papurana
- Species: P. kreffti

Binomial name
- Papurana kreffti (Boulenger, 1882)

Synonyms
- Rana kreffti Boulenger, 1882; Sylvirana kreffti (Boulenger, 1882); Hylarana kreffti (Boulenger, 1882)

= Papurana kreffti =

Species of amphibian

Papurana kreffti is a species of true frog, family Ranidae. It is native to New Ireland and Buka Island (Papua New Guinea) and the Solomon Islands. The specific name kreffti honours Gerard Krefft, a German adventurer who settled in Australia and became there to be regarded as the father of Australian herpetology. Common names San Cristoval frog and San Cristobal treefrog have been coined for it.

== Description ==
Males grow to 60 mm (2.4 in) in snout–vent length, but are generally closer to 50 mm (2.0 in). Females grow to at least 82 mm (3.2 in) in snout–vent length. The snout is pointed. The tympanum is visible but moderate in size. The fingers are long and have oval or slightly pointed discs but no webbing. The toes are almost fully webbed and moderately sized, oval discs. The legs are relatively short. There is a conspicuous, cream-coloured labial stripe.

The male advertisement call sounds like a series of short squeaks and consists of 3–6 pulsed notes.

== Habitat and conservation ==
Papurana kreffti is a common species in many areas and found inhabiting small, slow-flowing streams in lowland rainforest; it has also been recorded from wet grassy areas in disturbed habitats.
