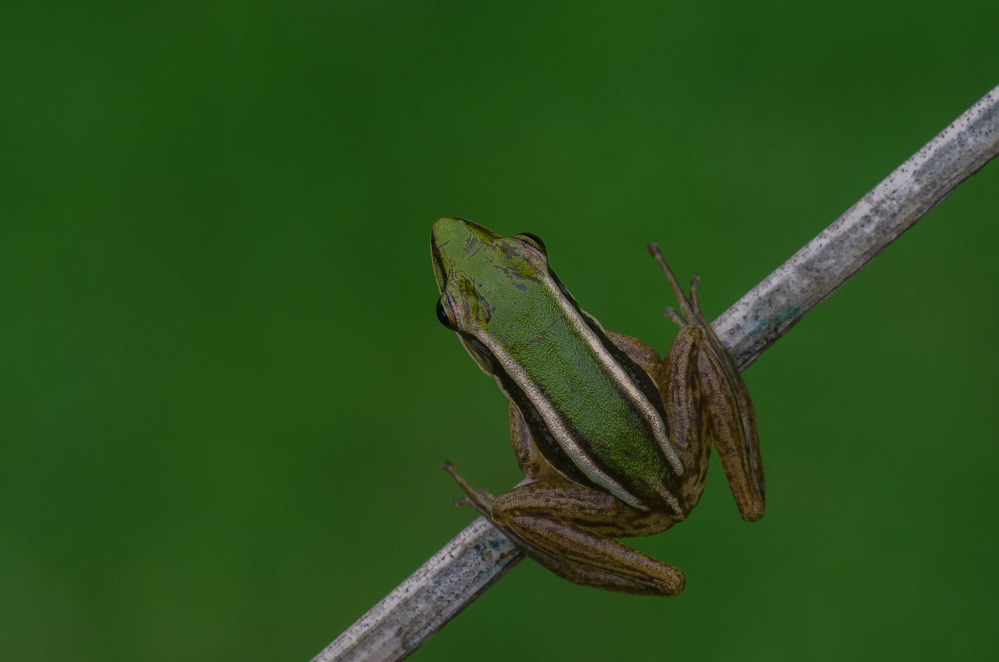
- Maoson frog

Conservation status
- Least Concern (IUCN 3.1)

Scientific classification
- Kingdom: Animalia
- Phylum: Chordata
- Class: Amphibia
- Order: Anura
- Family: Ranidae
- Genus: Sylvirana
- Species: S. maosonensis

Binomial name
- Sylvirana maosonensis (Bourret, 1937)

Synonyms
- Hylarana maosonensis Bourret, 1937; Rana maosonensis (Bourret, 1937)

= Sylvirana maosonensis =

Species of amphibian

Sylvirana maosonensis is a species of frog in the family Ranidae. It is found in the mountains of central and northeastern in Vietnam, Annamite Range in central Laos, and southern Guanxi, China. Its common name is Mao-Son frog or Maoson frog, after its type locality in Vietnam. It inhabits evergreen forests at elevations of 200–1,500 m (660–4,920 ft) above sea level. Individuals are typically found near streams on banks, leaf litter, and low in vegetation. Reproduction takes place in streams, ponds, and ditches. It is a locally common frog. Although International Union for Conservation of Nature (IUCN) does not considered it threatened as a species, habitat loss and degradation are threats.
