= Sylvirana montosa =

Scientific classification
- Kingdom: Animalia
- Phylum: Chordata
- Class: Amphibia
- Order: Anura
- Family: Ranidae
- Genus: Sylvirana
- Species: S. montosa

Binomial name
- Sylvirana montosa Sheridan and Stuart, 2018

Species of frog

Sylvirana montosa is a frog in the family Ranidae. It is endemic to Vietnam, Cambodia and Laos. Scientists first saw it on Phou Khaonok Mountain, 545 meters above sea level.

Scientists place this frog in the same species group as Sylvirana mortenseni.
