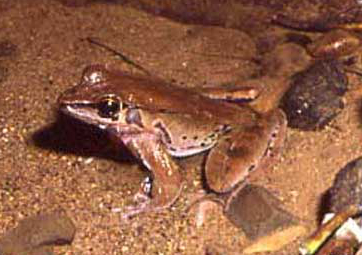

Conservation status
- Least Concern (IUCN 3.1)

Scientific classification
- Kingdom: Animalia
- Phylum: Chordata
- Class: Amphibia
- Order: Anura
- Family: Ranidae
- Genus: Sylvirana
- Species: S. cubitalis

Binomial name
- Sylvirana cubitalis (Smith, 1917)

Synonyms
- Hylarana cubitalis (Smith, 1917); Rana nigrotympanica Dubois, 1992

= Sylvirana cubitalis =

Species of frog

Sylvirana cubitalis, the Siam frog', Siamese frog yellow stream frog, darkeared frog, or black-eared frog is a species of frog in the family Ranidae. It is found in Myanmar, Thailand, Laos, China, and possibly Vietnam.

Its natural habitats are monsoon evergreen forest and rainforest, usually near fast-flowing streams, creeks and rivers. It is not considered threatened by the IUCN.

== Gallery ==
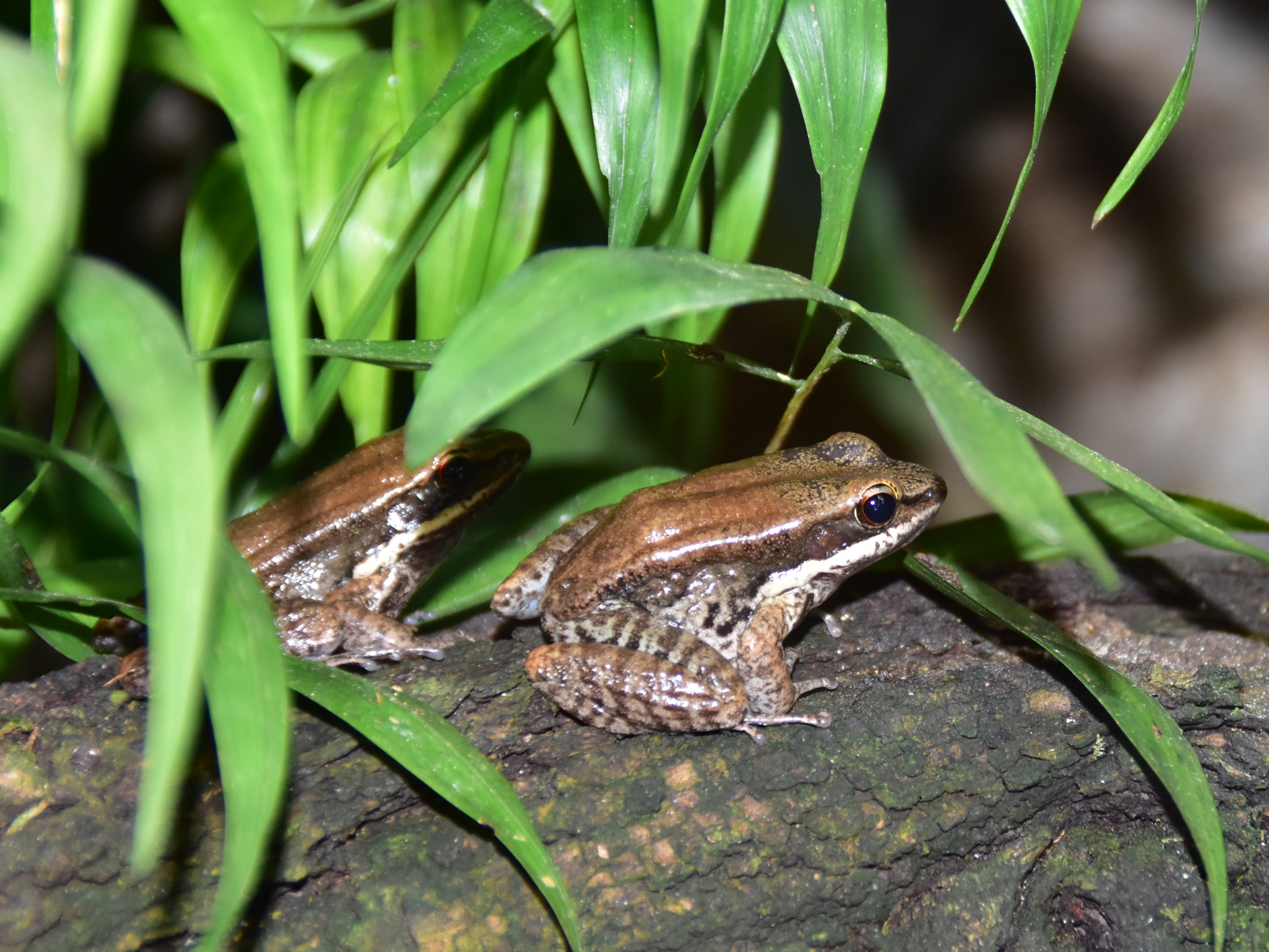
in Zoologischer Garten Köln
