= Papurana grisea =

Conservation status
- Data Deficient (IUCN 3.1)

Scientific classification
- Kingdom: Animalia
- Phylum: Chordata
- Class: Amphibia
- Order: Anura
- Family: Ranidae
- Genus: Papurana
- Species: P. grisea

Binomial name
- Papurana grisea (Van Kampen, 1913)

Synonyms
- Rana grisea van Kampen, 1913; Hylarana grisea (van Kampen, 1913); Sylvirana grisea (van Kampen, 1913)

Species of amphibian

Papurana grisea is a species of true frog. It is known with certainty only from its type locality in the Went Mountains, in the Indonesian province of Papua, New Guinea. Similar frogs are widespread in New Guinea, usually above 1,200 m (3,900 ft) above sea level, as well as on the Seram Island, but their identity is uncertain; they possibly represent another, undescribed species. Common names Went Mountains frog and Montaen swamp frog have been coined for it.

== Names ==
It is known as akpt or cebs in the Kalam language of Papua New Guinea.

== Description ==
Based on the holotype and another syntopic specimen, adult females measure 83–92 mm (3.3–3.6 in) in snout–vent length. The head is wider than the body and the snout is long and bluntly rounded in dorsal view, almost truncate in lateral view. The tympanum is distinct. The fingers have no webbing whereas the toes are almost fully webbed. The finger tips are flattened and expanded; the toe tips are pointed and bearing discs with circum-marginal grooves. The holotype is bleached, light-tan colored with three narrow bars in the thighs three to four in the shanks. The other specimen is better preserved and has uniform medium brown dorsum, bearing a hing of dark brown canthal stripe and face mask.

== Habitat and conservation ==
Papurana grisea presumably inhabits streams in rainforests. The type locality is at 1,200–1,300 m (3,900–4,300 ft).

== Life cycle ==
The female frog lays eggs in swamps or other places with still water. The eggs adhere to submerged rocks. The tadpoles can grow to 2.0 cm long. They have three rows of teeth in the upper jaw and two rows of teeth on the lower jaw.
