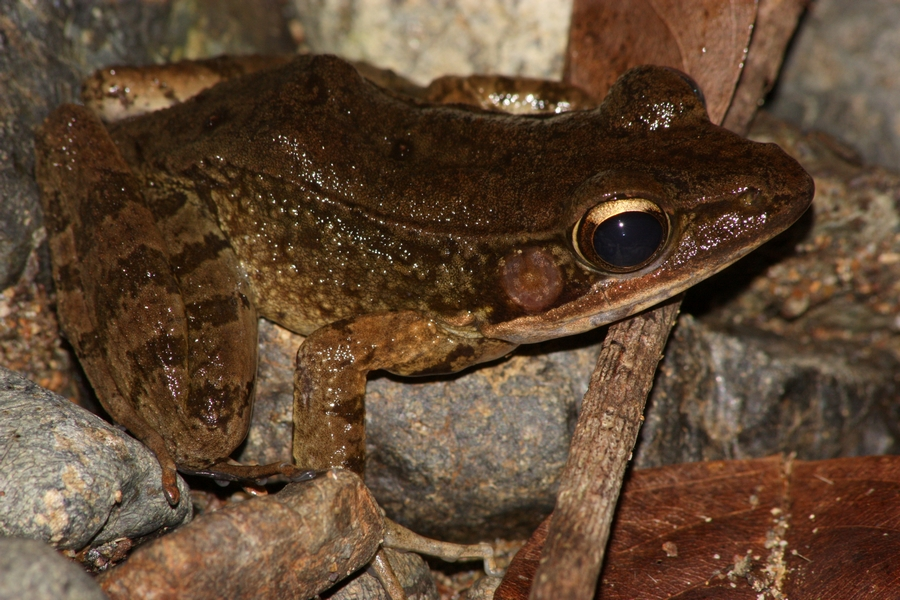
- Papurana waliesa

Scientific classification
- Kingdom: Animalia
- Phylum: Chordata
- Class: Amphibia
- Order: Anura
- Family: Ranidae
- Genus: Papurana; Dubois, 1992

Type species
- Rana papua Lesson, 1830

Synonyms
- Tylerana Dubois, 1992

= Papurana =

Genus of amphibians

Papurana is a genus of frogs in the family Ranidae, "true frogs". They are known from Southeast Asia, New Guinea, and northern Australia. Papurana daemeli is the only ranid frog found in Australia.

== Taxonomy ==
Papurana was originally introduced as a subgenus of Rana. It was often included in the then-diverse genus Hylarana, until Oliver and colleagues revised the genus in 2015, delimiting Hylarana more narrowly and elevating Papurana to genus rank.

== Description ==
The unique combination of characteristics that can distinguish Papurana are: presence of a postocular eye mask, robust body shape, posterior of thighs having strong vermiculations, and dorsolateral folds being either absent or thin, with asperities. The dorsum is evenly shagreened to warty and may carry spicules. The body size is from medium to very large with males having paired, external vocal sac.

== Species ==
The following species are recognised in the genus Papurana:

- Papurana arfaki (Meyer, 1875)
- Papurana attigua (Inger, Orlov, and Darevsky, 1999)
- Papurana aurata (Günther, 2003)
- Papurana celebensis (Peters, 1872)
- Papurana daemeli (Steindachner, 1868)
- Papurana elberti (Roux, 1911)
- Papurana florensis (Boulenger, 1897)
- Papurana garritor (Menzies, 1987)
- Papurana grisea (Van Kampen, 1913)
- Papurana jimiensis (Tyler, 1963)
- Papurana kreffti (Boulenger, 1882)
- Papurana milleti (Smith, 1921)
- Papurana milneana (Loveridge, 1948)
- Papurana moluccana (Boettger, 1895)
- Papurana novaeguineae (Van Kampen, 1909)
- Papurana papua (Lesson, 1829)
- Papurana supragrisea (Menzies, 1987)
- Papurana volkerjane (Günther, 2003)
- Papurana waliesa (Kraus and Allison, 2007)

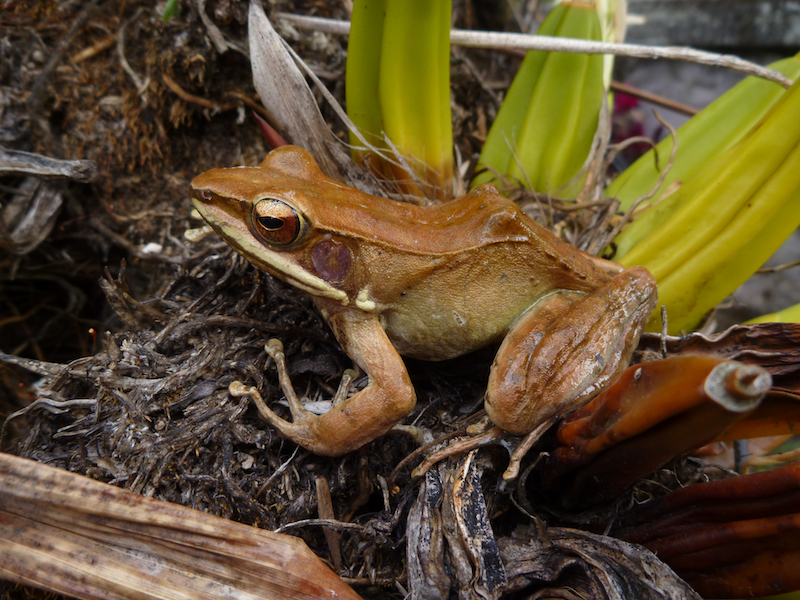
Papurana florensis
