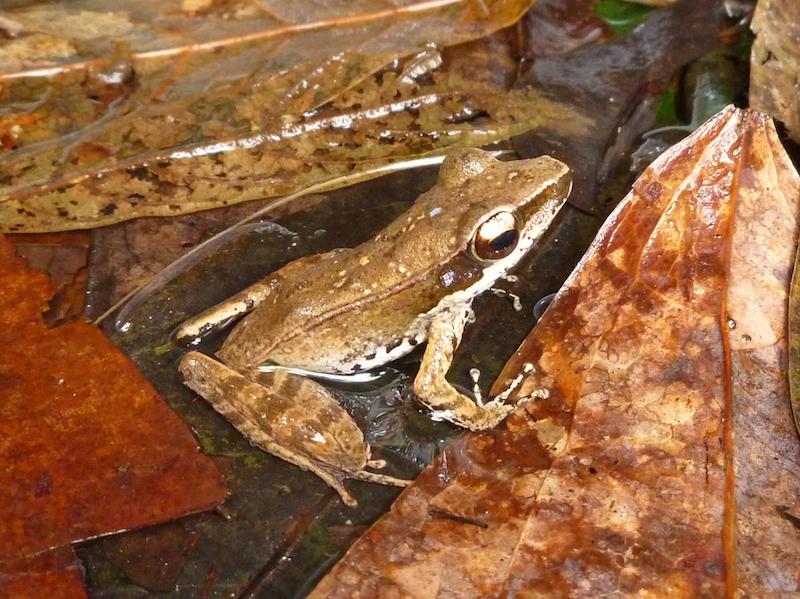

Conservation status
- Least Concern (IUCN 3.1)

Scientific classification
- Kingdom: Animalia
- Phylum: Chordata
- Class: Amphibia
- Order: Anura
- Family: Ranidae
- Genus: Papurana
- Species: P. celebensis

Binomial name
- Papurana celebensis (Peters, 1872)

Synonyms
- Rana celebensis (Peters, 1872); Hylarana celebensis (Peters, 1872)

= Papurana celebensis =

Species of amphibian

Papurana celebensis, also known as the Celebes frog, is a species of true frog in the family Ranidae. Prior to being reclassified into the genus Papurana in 2020, it was referred to as "Hylarana" celebensis. It is endemic to Sulawesi (Celebes), Indonesia. It is a lowland forest species, also occurring disturbed habitats. It has been observed between 326 and 1075 meters above sea level.
