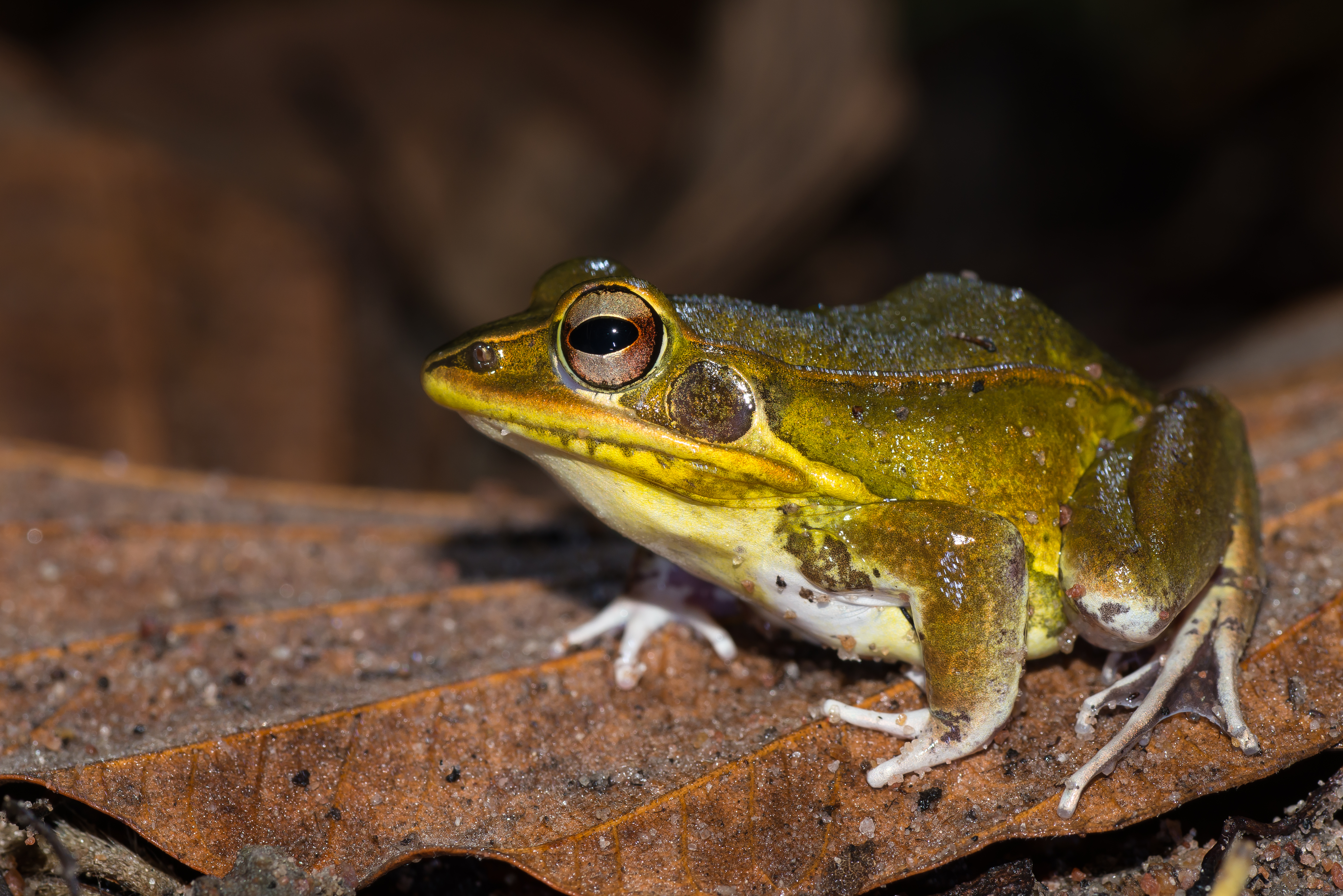
- In Huai Kha Khaeng Wildlife Sanctuary, Thailand

Conservation status
- Least Concern (IUCN 3.1)

Scientific classification
- Kingdom: Animalia
- Phylum: Chordata
- Class: Amphibia
- Order: Anura
- Family: Ranidae
- Genus: Humerana
- Species: H. lateralis

Binomial name
- Humerana lateralis (Boulenger, 1887)
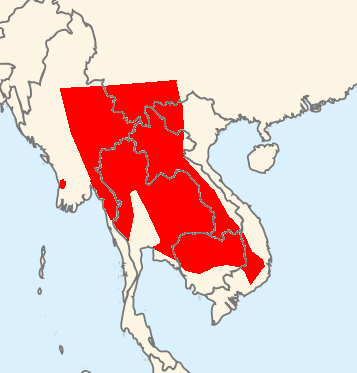

Synonyms
- Rana lateralis Boulenger, 1887; Rana nigrolineata Liu & Hu, 1960; Hylarana lateralis (Boulenger, 1887); Pelophylax lateralis

= Humerana lateralis =

Kokarit frog

Species of amphibian

Humerana lateralis is a species of frog in the family Ranidae. It is found in Cambodia, Laos, Myanmar, Thailand, and Vietnam. It is commonly known as Kokarit frog or yellow frog.

Placed in Rana when this was still loosely circumscribed, it was since assigned to the "water frog" genus Pelophylax. However, it is not clear whether this is the most appropriate treatment, and the Kokarit frog might rather belong in Hylarana. In 2015, it was classified into Humerana based on phylogenetic evidence. The supposed species Rana nigrolineata was recently determined to be a junior synonym of H. lateralis.

== Habitat ==
Its natural habitats are subtropical or tropical dry forest, subtropical or tropical moist lowland forest, subtropical or tropical dry lowland grassland, moist shrubland, plantations, swamps, freshwater marshes, intermittent freshwater marshes, ponds, and seasonally flooded or irrigated agricultural land. It is not considered threatened by the IUCN.

== Consumption ==
In parts of Cambodia north and east of the Mekong River, it is collected for human consumption in localities such as Snuol District, Kratie Province.
