= Humerana miopus =

Conservation status
- Least Concern (IUCN 3.1)

Scientific classification
- Kingdom: Animalia
- Phylum: Chordata
- Class: Amphibia
- Order: Anura
- Family: Ranidae
- Genus: Humerana
- Species: H. miopus

Binomial name
- Humerana miopus (Boulenger, 1918)

Synonyms
- Rana miopus Boulenger, 1918

Species of amphibian

Humerana miopus, also known as the Khao Wang frog or three-striped frog, is a frog that was identified in 1918. This species is known from southern Thailand and Peninsular Malaysia, and it is locally common.

Its dorsal colour is greyish-brown to orange-red above; the dorsolateral folds lighter. Diagonal lines on the back blackish; upper lip white; limbs with more or less distinct dark cross-bars; back of thighs marbled black and grey.
