= Papurana aurata =

Conservation status
- Data Deficient (IUCN 3.1)

Scientific classification
- Kingdom: Animalia
- Phylum: Chordata
- Class: Amphibia
- Order: Anura
- Family: Ranidae
- Genus: Papurana
- Species: P. aurata

Binomial name
- Papurana aurata (Günther, 2003)

Synonyms
- Rana aurata Günther, 2003; Hylarana aurata (Günther, 2003)

Species of amphibian

Papurana aurata is a species of true frog, the family Ranidae. It is only known from the area of its type locality near Nabire, in the Indonesian province of Papua, in New Guinea. The specific name aurata is Latin and refers to the gold-like colour of adult males.

== Description ==
Papurana aurata is a relatively large species, with adult males measuring 69–77 mm (2.7–3.0 in) and adult females, based on the sole female paratype, 107 mm (4.2 in) in snout–vent length. The overall appearance is robust. The head is slightly wider than the body. The snout is gradually tapering and has a rounded tip. The canthus rostralis well defined and straight. The tympanum is about half the size of the eye. The forelimbs are sturdy. The fingers are long and have small discs. The hind limbs are very long and strong. The toes are almost fully webbed and have discs that are larger than the finger discs. The species shows strong sexual dimorphism in colour, at least among individuals in mating conditions. The male show an intensive yellow dorsal surface of the head, body and extremities, sometimes fading to pale yellow or yellow-brownish at night. The female dorsal colouration was brown, by day and night. Dorsal colouration is uniform expect for possibly a few dots. The iris is pale yellow in its upper part and reddish brown below.

The male advertisement call consists of two notes, first a soft rattle and then a high-pitched trill. Sometimes either one of the notes is repeated, resulting in a three-note call.

== Habitat and conservation ==
Papurana aurata has been found inhabiting a mixture of primary and secondary rainforests near mountain streams and pools. Most specimens were found perched on vegetation 0.5–1.5 m (2–5 ft) above the ground, but some were also observed on rocks in the streams and pools. The tadpoles occur in small pools by slow-running sections of the streams. The species tolerates habitat disturbance as specimens have been found close to a road and in rural villages. Threats to it are unknown.
