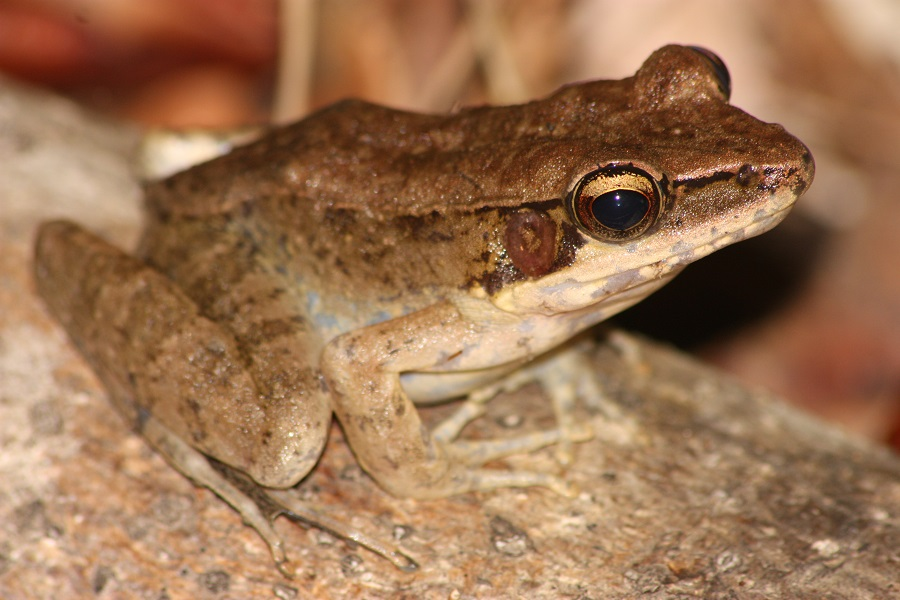
- Papurana daemeli in Porotona, Milne Bay, Papua New-Guinea

Conservation status
- Least Concern (IUCN 3.1)

Scientific classification
- Kingdom: Animalia
- Phylum: Chordata
- Class: Amphibia
- Order: Anura
- Family: Ranidae
- Genus: Papurana
- Species: P. daemeli

Binomial name
- Papurana daemeli (Steindachner, 1868)
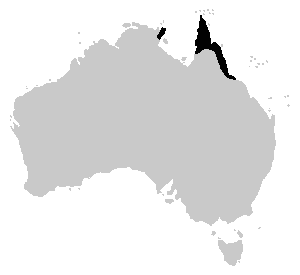
- Range in Australia (in black). The species is also widespread in New Guinea.

Synonyms
- Hylorana daemeli Steindachner, 1868; Hylarana nebulosa Macleay, 1878; Hyla nobilis De Vis, 1884; Rana novae-britanniae Werner, 1894; Rana daemeli (Steindachner, 1868); Sylvirana daemeli (Steindachner, 1868); Hylarana daemeli (Steindachner, 1868)

= Papurana daemeli =

Species of amphibian

Papurana daemeli is a species of "true frog", family Ranidae. It is found in New Guinea, northern Australia, and some smaller islands (Yapen, New Hanover Island, New Britain). It is the only ranid frog found in Australia. In Australia, the species is restricted to the rainforest of northern Queensland and the eastern border of Arnhem Land, in the Northern Territory. In Australia, it is usually known as wood frog (though in North America this would refer to Lithobates sylvaticus) or sometimes as water frog. Other vernacular names are Australian wood frog, Australian bullfrog, and Arnhem rana.

== Description ==
Males can grow to 64 mm (2.5 in) and females to 81 mm (3.2 in) in snout–vent length; typical size for Australia are 43–58 mm (1.7–2.3 in) in males and 58–81 mm (2.3–3.2 in) in females. The body is elongated and the limbs are long and muscular. The tympanum is distinct and relatively larger in males than in females. A dorso-lateral skin fold runs from behind the eye to the hindlimb. Skin is smooth or weakly granular. The face mask is not prominent; the dark loreal stripe is often incomplete and the post-ocular stripe is discontinuous and not clearly defined. The dorsum is dark brown above and usually becomes lighter on the sides. Ventral grounds colour varies from dirty white to light straw and is superimposed by some gray clouding.

Males have paired, lateral vocal sacs. The male advertisement call is a distinctive, 2–5 note pulsed call. It has been described sounding like duck quacking or exaggerated, sneering laugh. Tadpoles can grow to 60 mm (2.4 in) in total length and have long tails.

== Ecology and behaviour ==
Papurana daemeli is a semi-aquatic species. It occurs in rainforests, seasonally dry monsoon forests, and tropical woodlands, usually in association with permanent bodies of standing or slow-moving water (streams, swamps, lakes, pools, puddles, and lagoons). It can also occur in disturbed habitats, such as rural gardens and urban areas. Individuals usually hide among dense vegetation near water. In New Guinea it has been found up to 880 m (2,890 ft) above sea level. Males call from near water at different times of the year.

Papurana daemeli preys upon arthropods (spiders, shrimps, cockroaches, grasshoppers, beetles, moths) and other frogs.

== Conservation ==
Papurana daemeli is one of the most common and widespread frogs in New Guinea. In Australia it is locally common. It is consumed as food in New Guinea, but no significant threats to it are known. It occurs in several protected areas.
