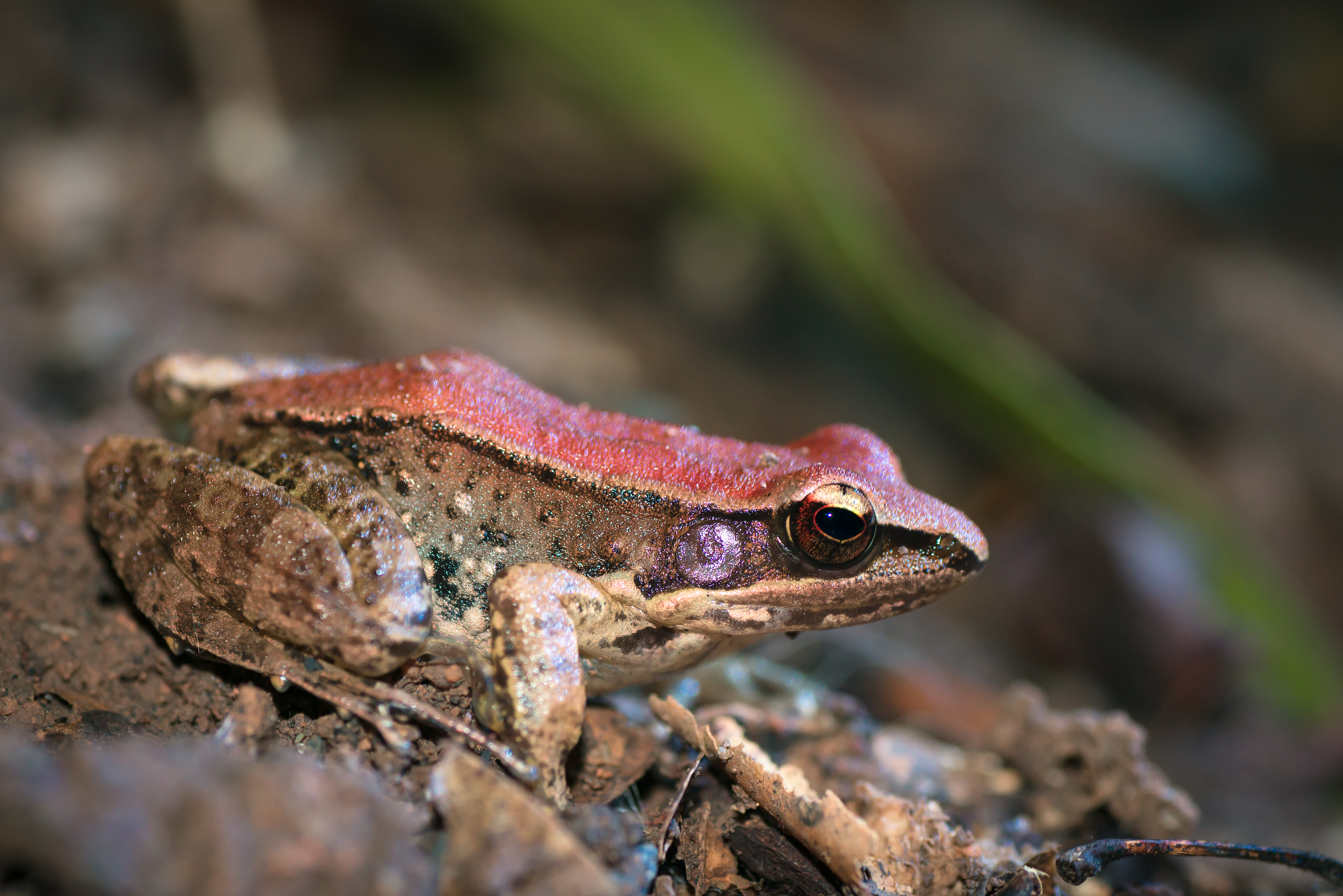
- In Khao Yai National Park

Conservation status
- Least Concern (IUCN 3.1)

Scientific classification
- Kingdom: Animalia
- Phylum: Chordata
- Class: Amphibia
- Order: Anura
- Family: Ranidae
- Genus: Sylvirana
- Species: S. mortenseni

Binomial name
- Sylvirana mortenseni (Boulenger, 1903)

Synonyms
- Rana mortenseni Boulenger, 1903; Hylarana mortenseni (Boulenger, 1903)

= Sylvirana mortenseni =

Species of amphibian

Sylvirana mortenseni is a species of true frog. It is found in Cambodia, Laos, and Thailand. The specific name mortenseni honours Ole Theodor Jensen Mortensen, the Danish zoologist who collected the holotype from the island of Koh Chang. Common names Mortensen's frog and Koh Chang Island frog have been proposed for it.

Sylvirana mortenseni has been recorded in evergreen forest on the lower slopes of the mountains, gallery forest, and heavily disturbed areas and forest edge habitats. It has been observed as high as 800 meters above sea level. Clear-cutting of forests is a threat to it, although it appears to also inhabit disturbed areas.
