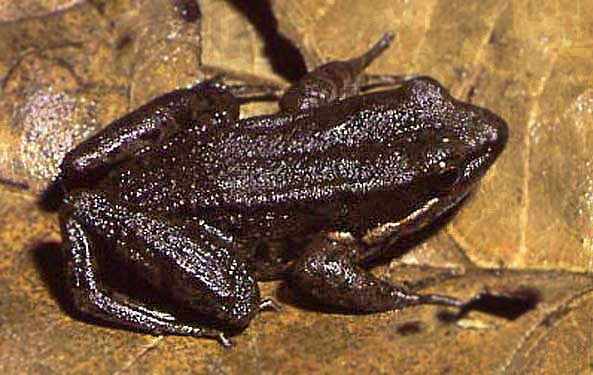

Conservation status
- Least Concern (IUCN 3.1)

Scientific classification
- Kingdom: Animalia
- Phylum: Chordata
- Class: Amphibia
- Order: Anura
- Family: Ranidae
- Genus: Sylvirana
- Species: S. nigrovittata

Binomial name
- Sylvirana nigrovittata (Blyth, 1856)

Synonyms
- Lymnodytes nigrovittatus Blyth, 1856 "1855"; Hylarana nigrovittata (Blyth, 1856); Hylarana menglaensis Fei, Ye & Xie, 2008; Sylvirana menglaensis (Fei, Ye & Xie, 2008); Hylarana hekouensis Fei, Ye & Xie, 2008; Sylvirana hekouensis (Fei, Ye & Xie, 2008)

= Sylvirana nigrovittata =

Species of amphibian

Sylvirana nigrovittata, also known as the black-striped frog, black-spotted stream frog, sapgreen stream frog, etc., is a species of frog in the family Ranidae. It is found in northeastern India, Bangladesh, Nepal, southern China, Myanmar, Thailand, Cambodia, Laos, and Vietnam. It has been observed as high as 800 meters above sea level. The species was redelimited in 2018, and earlier literature may refer to other species; identifications from India and Bangladesh are still uncertain.

Sylvirana nigrovittata occurs in gentle streams in evergreen forest, including evergreen galleries in deciduous forest areas. The tadpoles develop quiet stream sections. It is a common species. It is threatened by the loss of forest canopy over streams it inhabits, as well as hydrological changes. It is not considered threatened by the IUCN.

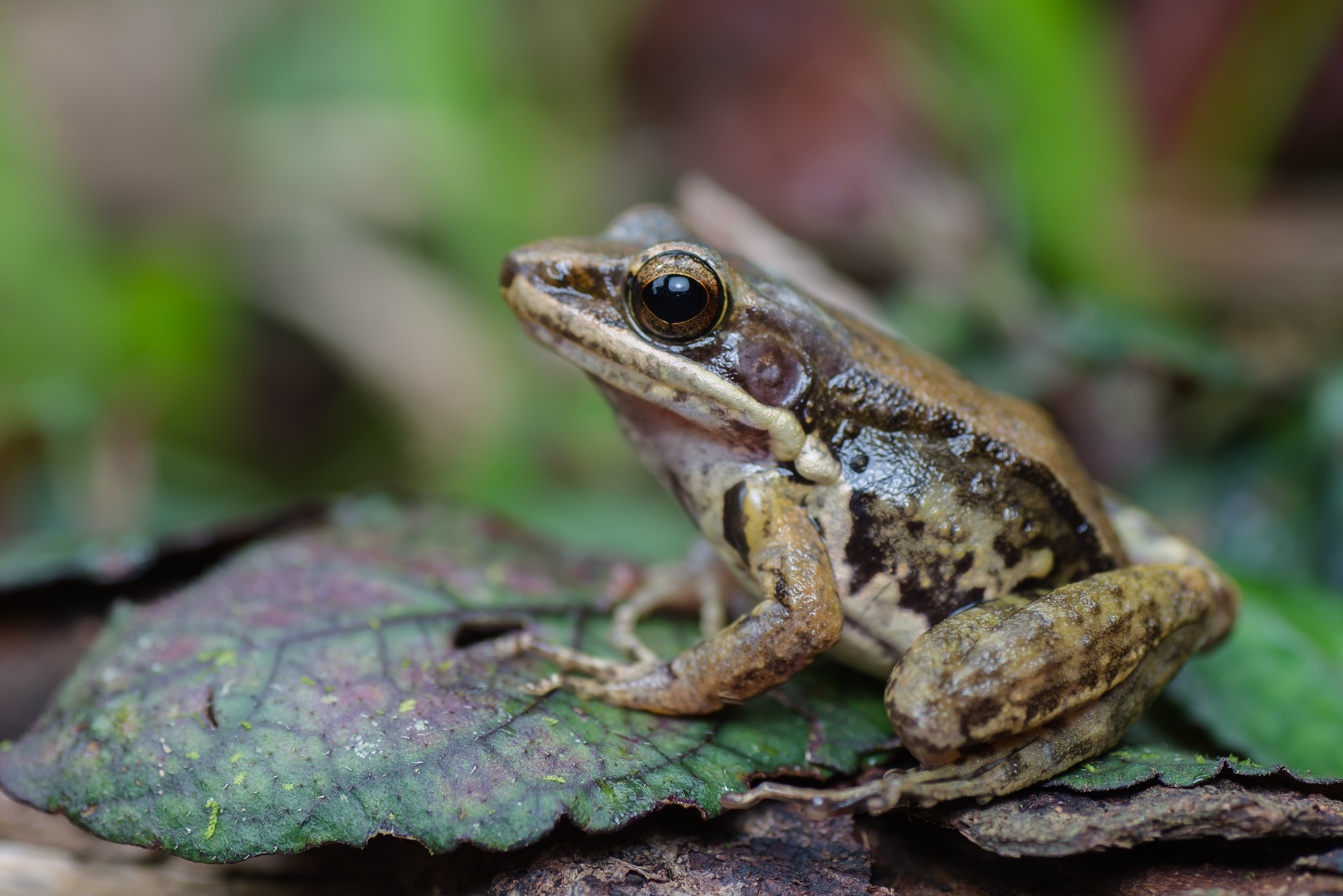
Sylvirana cf. nigrovittata, Khao Luang National Park

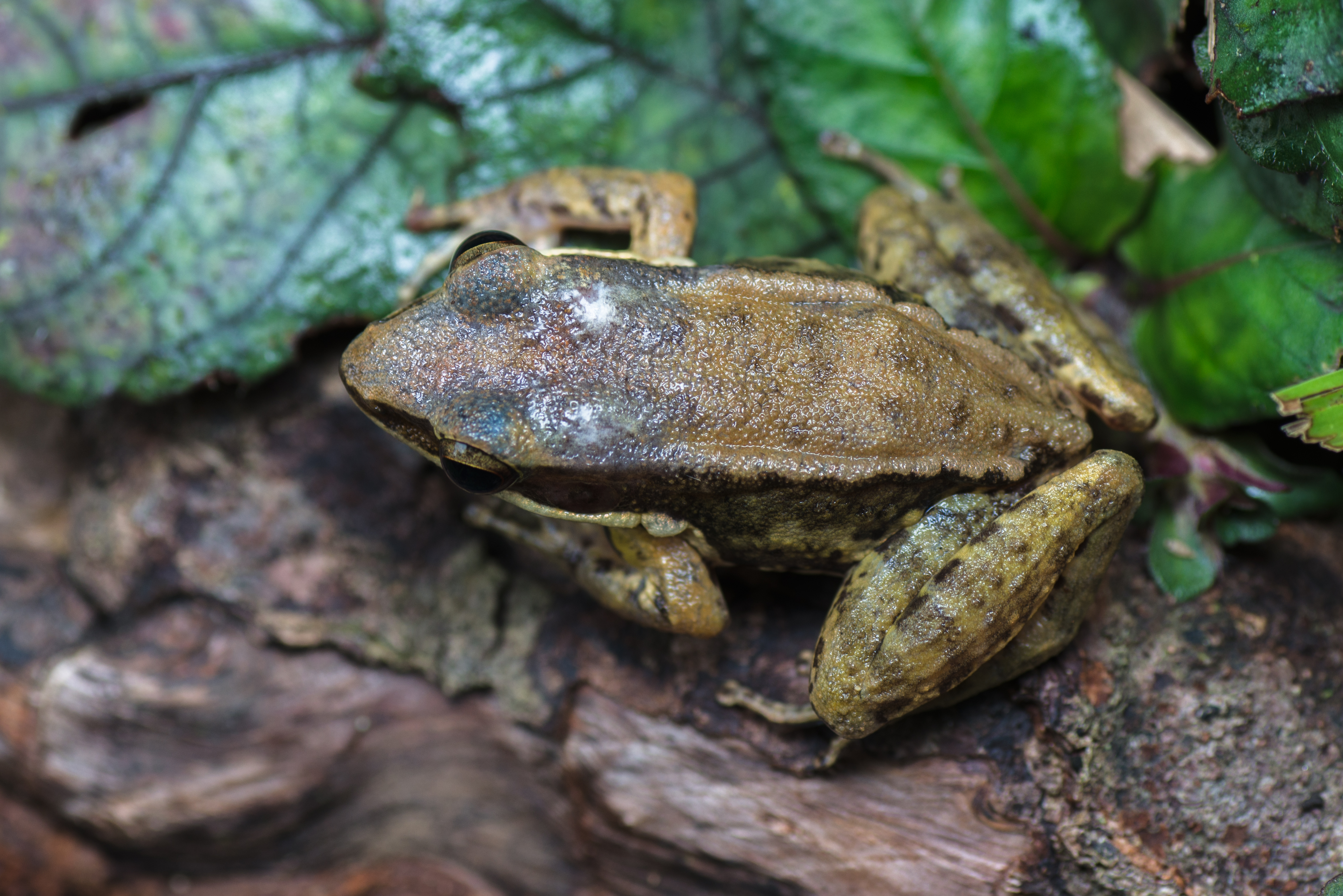
Sylvirana cf. nigrovittata, Khao Luang National Park
