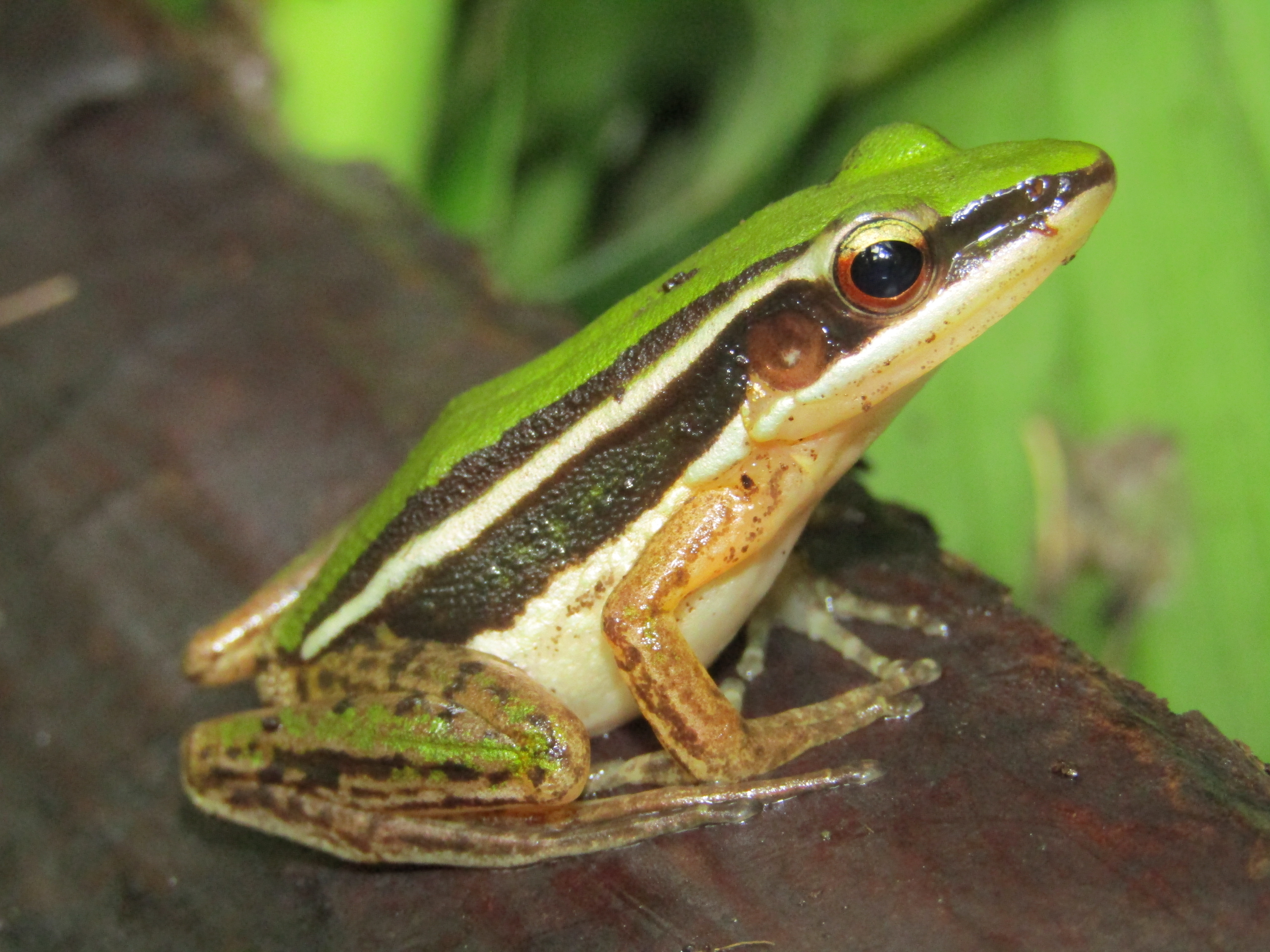
- Hylarana tytleri

Scientific classification
- Kingdom: Animalia
- Phylum: Chordata
- Class: Amphibia
- Order: Anura
- Family: Ranidae
- Subfamily: Raninae
- Genus: Hylarana; Tschudi, 1838

Type species
- Hylarana erythraea Schlegel, 1837

Diversity
- 4 species

Synonyms
- Hylorana Günther, 1864; Limnodytes Duméril and Bibron, 1841; Tenuirana Fei, Ye, and Huang, 1990; Zoodioctes Gistel, 1848

= Hylarana =

Genus of amphibians

Hylarana, commonly known as golden-backed frogs, is a genus of true frogs found in tropical Asia. It was formerly considered highly diverse, containing around 84 to 96 valid species, but taxonomic revision resulted in a major change in the contents of the genus, recognizing just four species.

== Description ==
Hylarana are small to large-sized frogs. Males have an average snout-vent length of 27 to 85 mm (1.1 to 3.3 in), while females range from 38 to 92 mm (1.5 to 3.6 in). The nares (nostrils) are oval in shape and covered by a flap of skin. The tympanum is visible but is not covered by a supratympanic fold. Vomerine teeth and a pineal ocellus (parietal eye) are present. The toes are webbed, but the fingers are not.

== Distribution ==
Former members of the genus Hylarana ranged from Sri Lanka to the Western Ghats of India, through Nepal and southern China and Taiwan, down to Southeast Asia to the Philippines and Papua New Guinea, in Northern Australia, and tropical Africa. Following taxonomic revisions, the genus distribution was restricted to Southern and southeast Asia.

== Taxonomy ==
Hylarana belongs to the subfamily Raninae of the true frog family Ranidae. The generic name Hylarana derives from Neo-Latin hyle ('wood' or 'forest') and rana ('frog'). Hylarana was previously considered to be a subgenus of the genus Rana. It was recognized as a distinct genus in 2005. Several genera were further split from Hylarana in 2006, and then treated again as junior synonyms of Hylarana. In 2015, Oliver et al. performed a major taxonomic re-assessment of Hylarana. Their taxonomic reassessment left just four of the former 80–100 species within the genus Hylarana sensu stricto. The rest were transferred to Abavorana, Amnirana, Chalcorana, Humerana, Hydrophylax, Indosylvirana, Papurana, Pulchrana, and Sylvirana. In 2023, Amphibian Species of the World tentatively transferred all species in these genera back to Hylarana pending future studies due to significant taxonomic confusion over the group; however, these changes are not recognized by AmphibiaWeb.

=== Species ===
Formerly, the genus consisted of around 84 to 96 valid species. Following a major re-classification, only four species are recognised in the genus Hylarana:

- Hylarana erythraea (Schlegel, 1837) - common green frog, green paddy frog, leaf frog, or red-eared frog
- Hylarana macrodactyla Günther, 1858 - Guangdong frog, three-striped grass frog, or marbled slender frog
- Hylarana taipehensis (Van Denburgh, 1909) - two-striped grass frog
- Hylarana tytleri Theobald, 1868

== See also ==
- Rana
