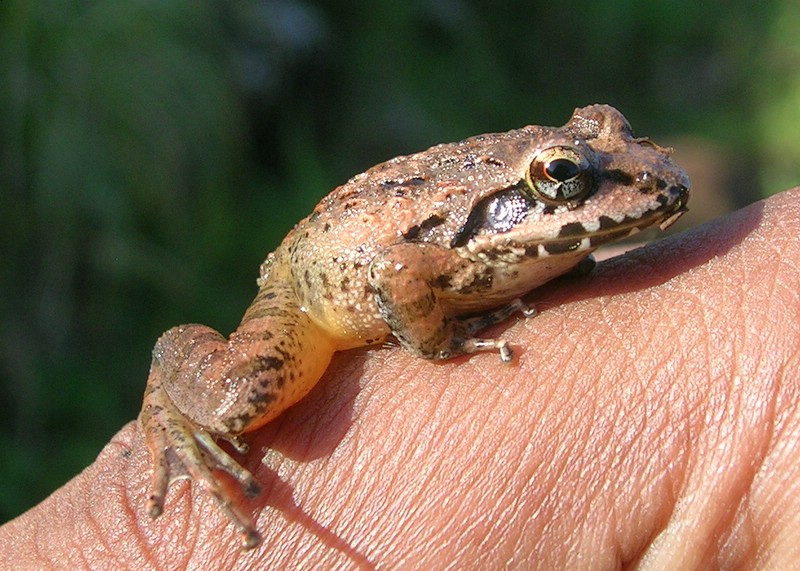
- Adult from Talakaveri shola grassland

Conservation status
- Least Concern (IUCN 3.1)

Scientific classification
- Kingdom: Animalia
- Phylum: Chordata
- Class: Amphibia
- Order: Anura
- Family: Ranixalidae
- Genus: Indirana
- Species: I. semipalmata

Binomial name
- Indirana semipalmata (Boulenger, 1882)

Synonyms
- Rana semipalmata Boulenger, 1882; Ranixalus semipalmatus (Boulenger, 1882)

= Indirana semipalmata =

Species of amphibian

Indirana semipalmata is a species of frog endemic to the Western Ghats region of southern India. They are small frogs, reaching lengths of about 36 mm (1.4 in) from snout to vent. The species breeds during the monsoons, laying their eggs on moist rocks and tree bark. Their tadpoles are terrestrial – hatching, feeding, and undergoing metamorphosis without ever entering any standing bodies of water.

== Description ==
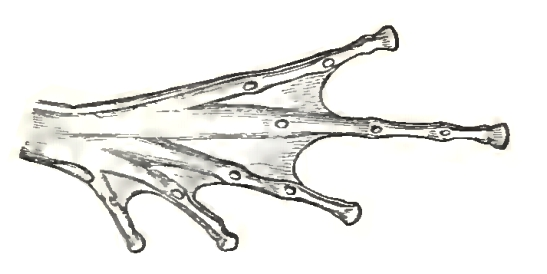
Lower surface of foot

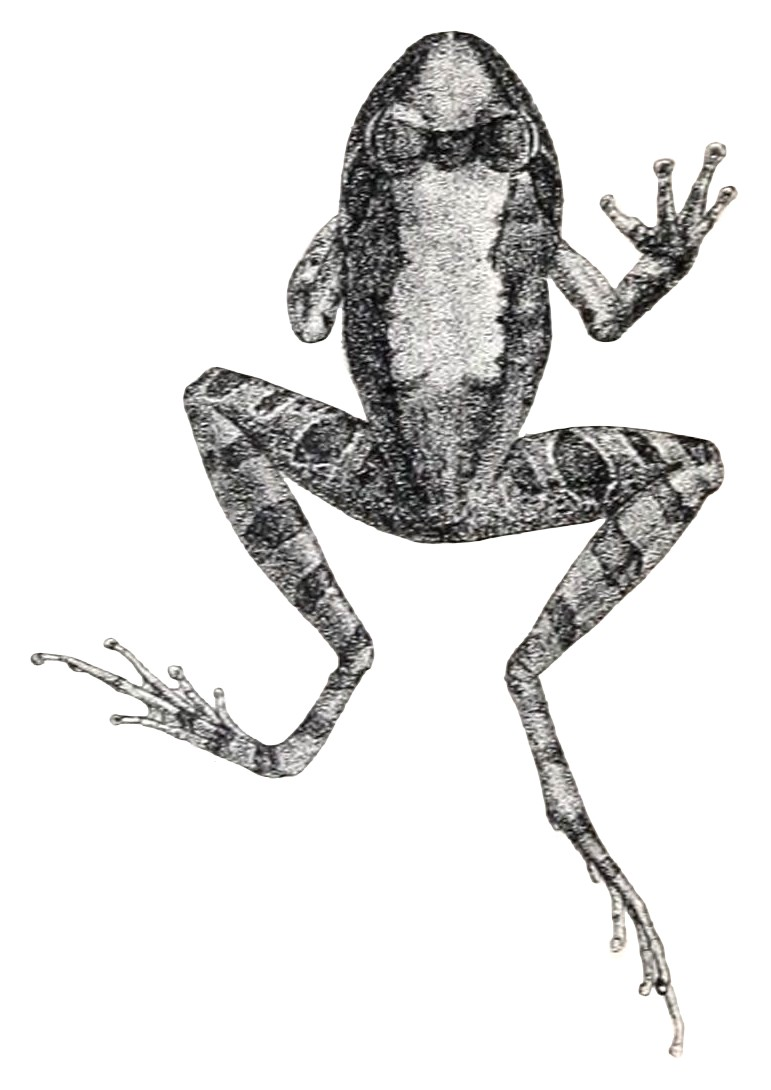
Illustration of I. semipalmata

Indirana semipalmata is a small frog, with a snout-vent length (SVL) of 36 mm (1.4 in). The snout is blunt with moderate canthal ridges. The space between the eyes is about the same width as each of the upper eyelids. The tympanum and the eyes are of the same diameter. It possesses vomerine teeth with two slightly oblique oval groups just behind the level of the rear edge of the choanae. The males of the species lack vocal sacs.

The first fingers of the forelimbs extend slightly beyond the second. At the ventral surface of each joint are well-developed tubercles and there is a single oval tubercle along the inner metatarsals. If the hind limbs are stretched forward the length of the body, the tibiotarsal ("ankle") articulation reaches the snout.

The skin of Indirana semipalmata has short longitudinal glandular folds on the back; while on the bottom surface, it is smooth . It is predominantly brown in coloration with the throat and chest mottled and lighter in color. The temples and the sides of the eyes (the temporal and loreal regions) are black. A dark band is also present between the eyes at the top of the head. The limbs possess dark stripes across.

== Taxonomy ==
Indirana semipalmata was first described by the Belgian-British zoologist George Albert Boulenger in 1882 as Rana semipalmata. The exact location the type specimen was collected from is unknown, but it was recorded as "Malabar", South India. The specific name (Latin for "half palmed") is in reference to its half-webbed toes, in contrast to Indirana beddomii which had two-thirds of their toes webbed and Indirana leptodactyla which only had a third of their toes webbed. In 1918, Boulenger included it under the (then) subgenus Discodeles of the genus Rana. In 1986, the Belgian zoologist Raymond Ferdinand Laurent separated it, along with other closely related species from India, to the genus Indirana.

I. semipalmata does not have a widely used common name, but it has sometimes been referred to as the "brown leaping frog", "small-handed frog", and "South Indian frog".

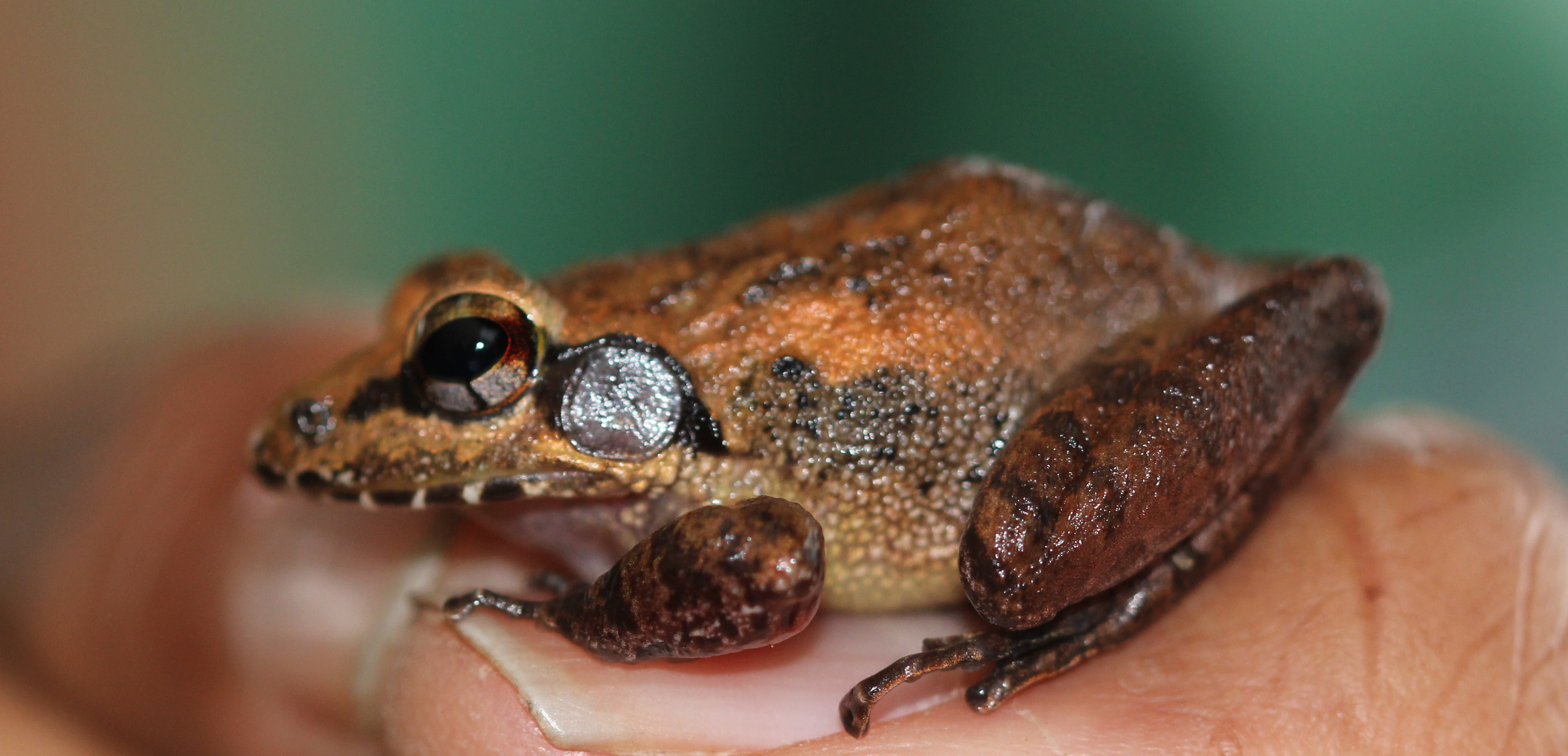
Indirana semipalmeta at Bisile, India

== Distribution ==
Indirana semipalmata is endemic to an area less than 20,000 km^{2} (7,700 mi^{2}) in the southern Western Ghats of India. It inhabits altitudes between 200 and 1,100 m (660 and 3,610 ft) above sea level. They have been recorded in at least ten localities – Malabar, Pulloorampara, Kodaikanal, Idukki, Parambikulam, Kalakkad, Siruvani, Shringeri, Agumbe, and Kudremukh.

== Ecology and biology ==
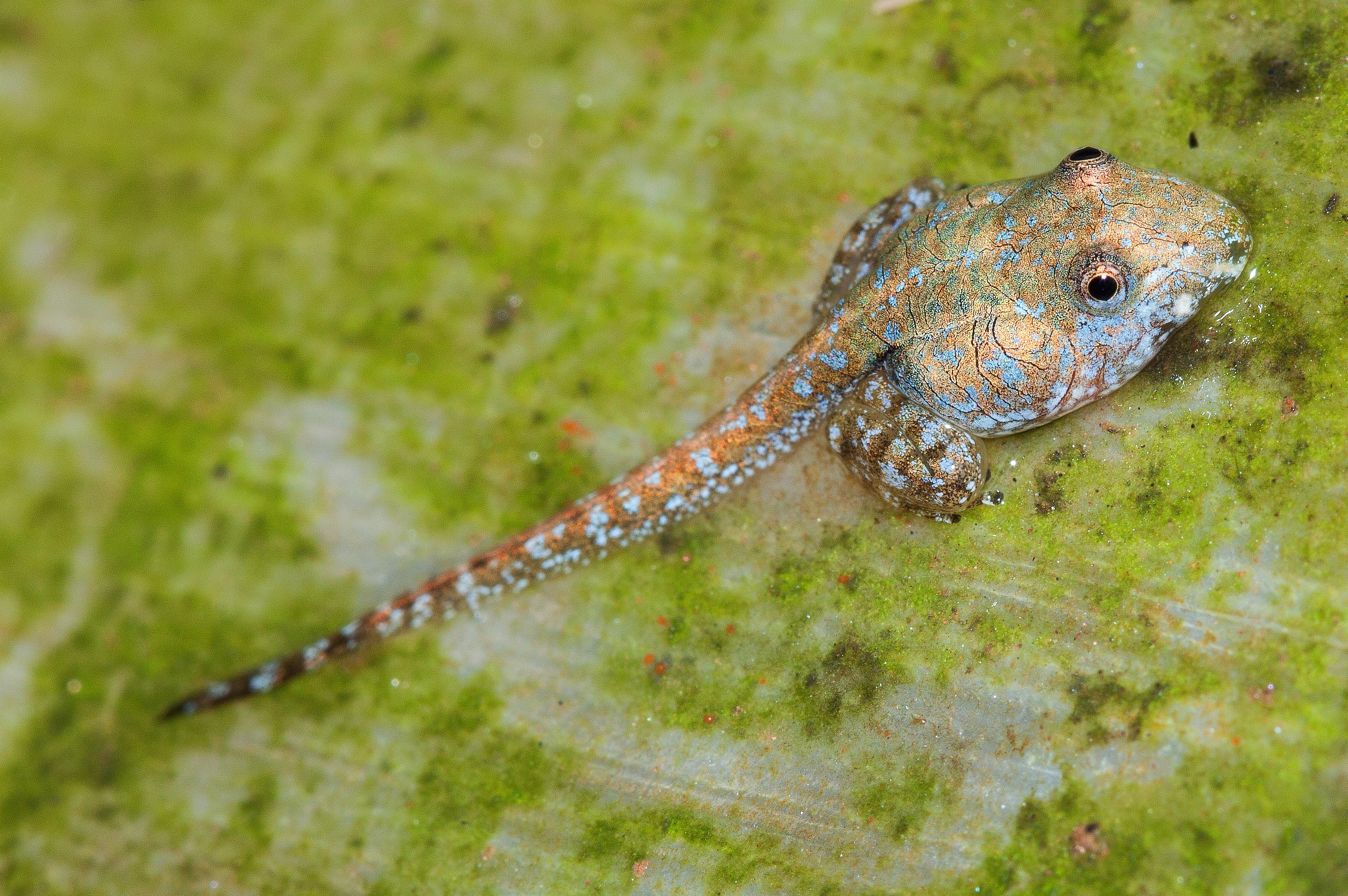
Indirana semipalmata tadpole, on a plastic sheet used to cover a shed from, Hosamata, Puttur, Karnataka, India

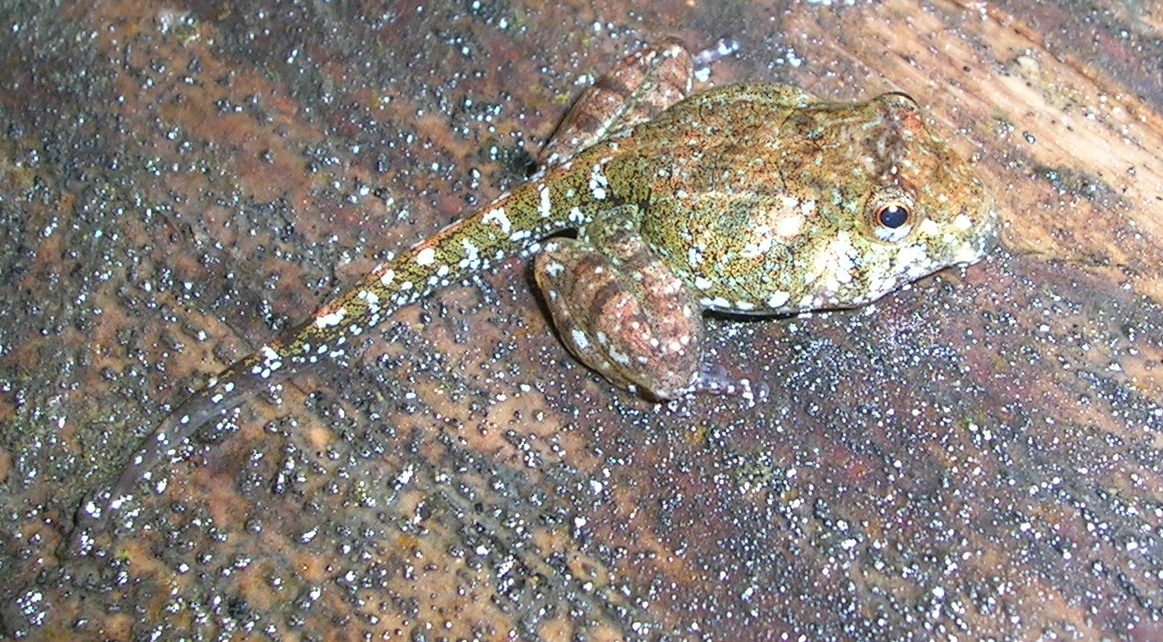
Tadpole from Coorg, India on tree bark

The ecology and biology of Indirana semipalmata has not been extensively studied. It is a terrestrial species generally found on vegetation beside the banks of streams and rivers (riparian habitats). It can also be found in swamps and in the leaf litter in the floors of evergreen, semi-evergreen, and tropical rainforests.

I. semipalmata breeds and lays clutches of eggs on wet rocks and the bark of fallen trees during the monsoon season. In a study in 2010 in the Agumbe Rainforest Research Station (ARRS), Karnataka, India, the eggs had an average diameter of 2.7 mm (0.11 in). Each clutch had an average of 343 eggs. Adult males were also observed near the egg clutches, presumably guarding them. Like most of the other members of the subfamily Ranixalinae, the tadpoles are non-aquatic. Upon hatching, the tadpoles remain on the moist surfaces, undergoing metamorphosis without ever entering any standing bodies of water. In the 2010 study, all of the egg clutches and the tadpoles were found at least 3 m (9.8 ft) from the nearest pool of water. The eggs and tadpoles are instead kept moist by dripping water from leaves and rainfall.

The tadpoles have finless tails and strongly hooked beaks which enable them to skip along hard surfaces rather than swim. Partially metamorphosed tadpoles can leap with their hind limbs. Observations on the feeding behavior on the tadpoles also reveal that they feed on bark substrate, the first known instance of any tadpole doing so. It is presumed that they feed on the plankton growing on the bark.

The skin of the species has been found to produce a virucidal host-defense peptide against influenza A, which has been given the name urumin. This compound may have therapeutic potential against influenza A infection in humans.

== Conservation ==
Indirana semipalmata is classified as least concern by the International Union for Conservation of Nature and Natural Resources (IUCN). Conversion of their habitats to agricultural use and logging, mining, and tourism activities are considered to be their main threats, but they remain relatively common in their native habitats. I. semipalmata is a protected species under the laws of India.

Scientists have observed the fungus Batrachochytrium dendrobatidis on this frog, but they do not know the extent of its morbidity or mortality. Batrachochytrium dendrobatidis causes the fungal disease chytridiomycosis.
