= Parambikulam Tiger Reserve =

Protected area lying in Palakkad district of Kerala state

- IUCN category IV (habitat/species management area)
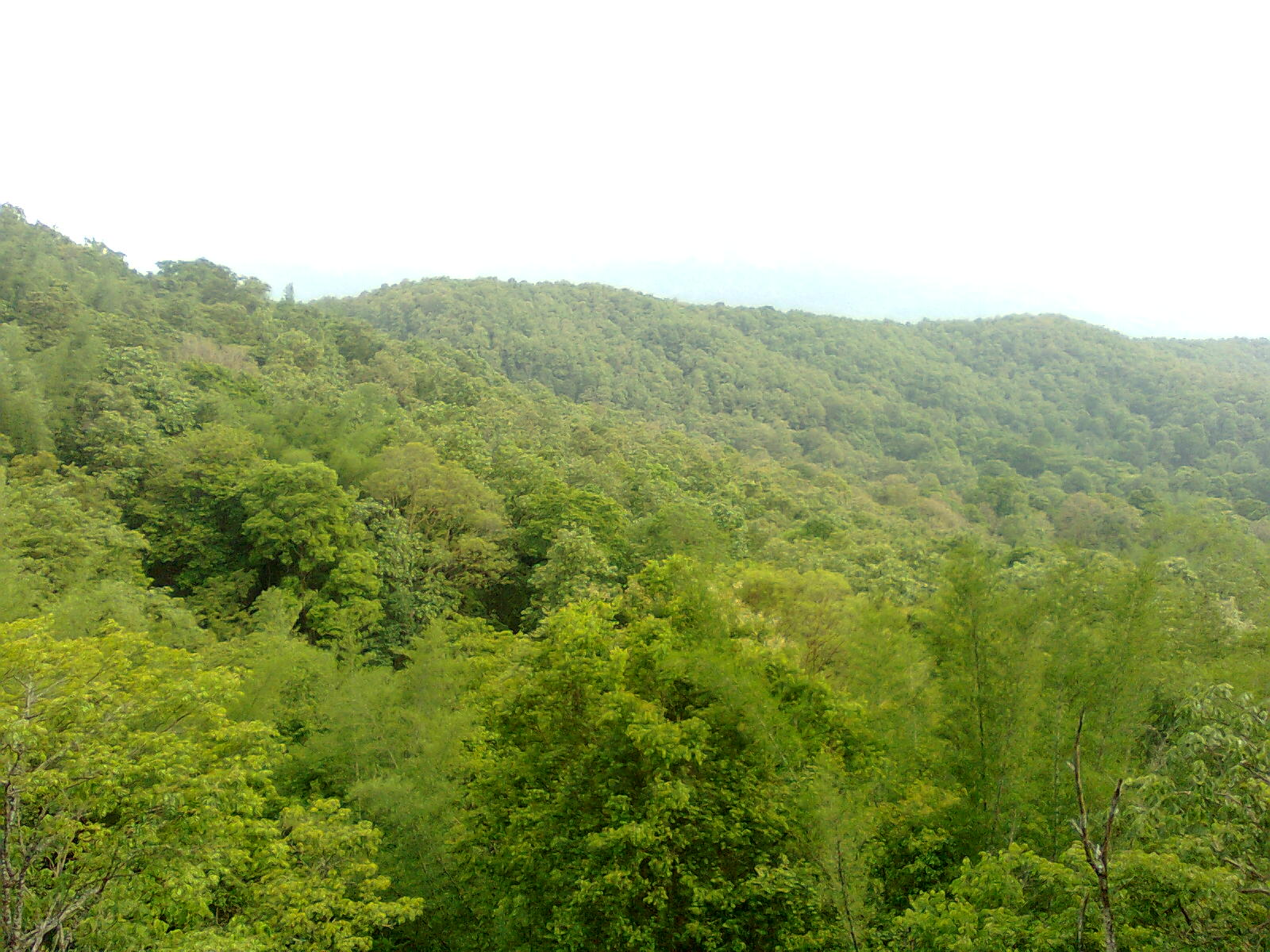
- Parambikulam Tiger Reserve

- Location within Kerala Location within India
- Interactive map of Parambikulam Tiger Reserve
- Location: Palakkad District, Kerala, India and Thrissur District, Kerala, India
- Nearest city: Palakkad (90 km)
- Coordinates: 10°23′0″N 76°42′30″E
- Area: 643.66 km^{2} (248.52 sq mi)
- Established: 2009
- Visitors: 100000 (in 2019)
- Governing body: Project Tiger
- Website: www.parambikulam.org

Parambikulam Tiger Reserve, which also includes the erstwhile Parambikulam Wildlife Sanctuary, is a 643.66 km^{2} (248.52 sq mi) protected area lying in Palakkad district and Thrissur district of Kerala state, South India. It had an area of 285 km^{2} (110 sq mi) and was established in part in 1973 and 1984. It is in the Sungam range of hills between the Anaimalai Hills and Nelliampathy Hills. Parambikulam Wildlife Sanctuary was declared as part of the Parambikulam Tiger Reserve on 19 February 2010. Including the buffer zone, the tiger reserve has a span of 643.66 km^{2} (248.52 sq mi). The Western Ghats, Anamalai Sub-Cluster, including all of Parambikulam Wildlife Sanctuary, has been declared by the UNESCO World Heritage Committee as a World Heritage Site.

The Tiger Reserve is the home of four different tribes of indigenous peoples including the Kadar, Malasar tribe, Muduvar and Mala Malasar settled in six colonies. Parambikulam Tiger Reserve implements the Project Tiger scheme along with various other programs of the Government of India and the Government of Kerala. The operational aspects of administering a tiger reserve is as per the scheme laid down by the National Tiger Conservation Authority. People from tribal colonies inside the reserve are engaged as guides for treks and safaris, and are provided employment through various eco-tourism initiatives. Parambikulam Tiger Reserve is among the top-ten best managed Tiger Reserve in India. The tiger reserve hosts many capacity building training programmes conducted by Parambikulam Tiger Conservation Foundation in association with various organisations.

== Geography ==
The sanctuary is located between Longitude:76° 35’- 76° 50’ E, and Latitude:10° 20’ – 10° 26’ N. It is 135 kilometres (84 mi) from Palakkad town and adjacent to the Annamalai Wildlife Sanctuary to the east in Tamil Nadu. It is bordered to the north by Nemmara Forest Division, to the south by Vazhachal Forest Division and the west by Chalakudy Forest Division. The sanctuary has a hornblende, biotite, gneiss and charnockite geology.

Altitude ranges between 300 m and 1438 m. There is a 600 m elevation opening through the Nelliampathy hills from Anamalai hills on the northern boundary of the sanctuary at Thoothampara. Major peaks in the sanctuary are Karimala Gopuram (1438 m) in the southern boundary of the sanctuary, Pandaravarai (1290 m) in the north, Kuchimudi, Vengoli Malai (1120 m) in the eastern boundary and Puliyarapadam (1010 m) in the west.

The sanctuary has three man-made reservoirs; Parambikulam, Thunacadavu (Thunakkadavu) and Peruvaripallam, with a combined area of 20.66 km^{2}. The Thuvaiar water falls empty into one of the reservoirs. There are 7 major valleys and 3 major rivers, the Parambikulam, the Sholayar and the Thekkedy. The Karappara river and Kuriarkutty river also drain the area.

== History ==
The tiger reserve has remnants of the Cochin State Forest Tramway, which was used to ship wood from the Parambikulam forests to the nearby harbor at Kochi, and from there to different locations of the world.

== Fauna ==
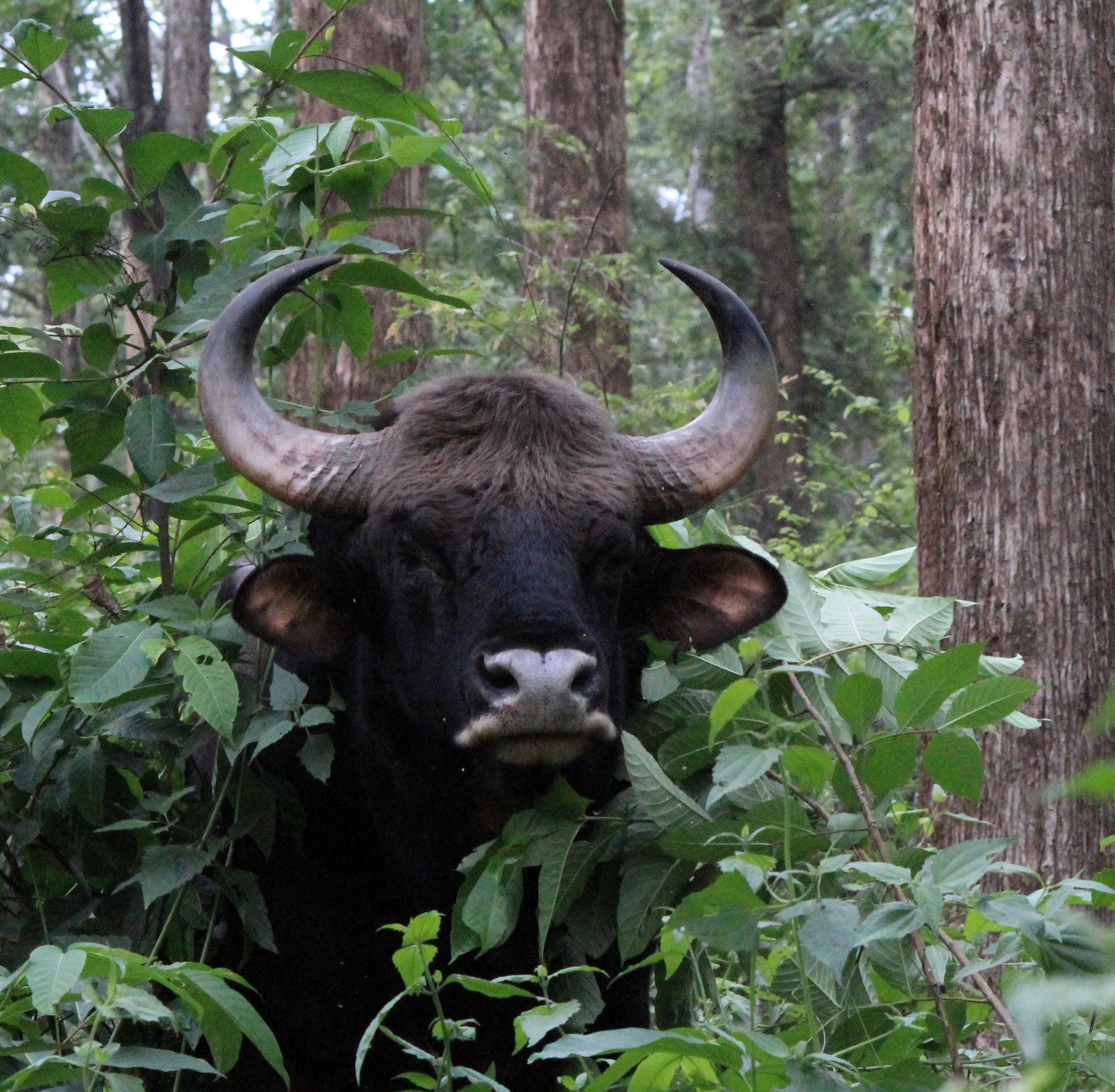
Indian gaur (Bos gaurus) at Prarambikulam.

The sanctuary has a rich biodiversity of animal life including mammals (39 species), amphibians (16 sp.), birds (268 sp.), reptiles (61 sp.), fishes (47 sp.) and invertebrates (over 1,200 species). Parambikulam is referred to as the "state capital for the massive gaur" by wildlife experts.

- Mammals of note include: lion-tailed macaque, Indian gaur, Nilgiri tahr, Indian elephant, Bengal tiger, Indian leopard, wild boar, dhole, sambar, bonnet macaque, Nilgiri langur, sloth bear, Nilgiri marten, small Travancore flying squirrel and.
- Reptiles of high importance at Parambikulam include: king cobra, Kerala shieldtail, Travancore kukri snake, Travancore wolf snake, Cochin cane turtle, Travancore tortoise, Indian day gecko and Western Ghats flying lizard. Other important reptiles are Indian rock python, Malabar pit viper, Travancore tortoise, South Indian forest ground gecko, South Indian rock lizard, mountain skink, mugger crocodile, varanus, pond terrapin, chameleon and the snakes spectacled cobra, krait, green keelback, olivaceous keelback, western rat snake and vine snake.
- Fishes — 47 species of fish have been recorded at Parambikulam, of which seven species are listed as endangered and 17 are endemic to the Western Ghats.
- Birds — 268 avian species have been recorded in the sanctuary; 134 are listed as rare while 18 are endemic to the Western Ghats. These include the lesser adjutant stork, grey-headed fish-eagle, Sri Lanka bay owl, broad-billed roller and great pied hornbill. Other birds include: darter, little cormorant, black eagle, black-capped kingfisher, great Indian hornbill, and white-bellied woodpecker. See complete checklist of birds of Parambikulam Wildlife sanctuary: PDF
- Butterflies — 221 species of lepidopterans have been recorded in the sanctuary, of which 11 are rare and endemic.
- Amphibians — the 23 amphibian species documented within the sanctuary include: ridged toad (Bufo parietalis), common Asiatic toad (Bufo melanostictus), large wrinkled frog (Nyctibatrachus major), small wrinkled frog (Nyctibatrachus minor), Indian bullfrog (Rana tigerina), Verrucose frog (Minervarya keralensis), skipper frog (Euphlyctis cyanophlyctis), Boulenger's Indian frog (Walkerana leptodactyla), Fejervarya limnocharis, Beddome's leaping frog (Indirana beddomii), South Indian frog (Indirana semipalmata), bicoloured frog (Rana curtipes), bronzed frog (Indosylvirana temporalis), reddish burrowing frog (Minervarya rufescens), Parambikulam wart frog (Minervarya parambikulamana), white-nosed bush frog (Philautus leucorhinus), white-spotted bush frog (Raorchestes chalazodes), Kerala warty frog (Minervarya keralensis), cricket frog (Limnonectes limnocharis), short-webbed leaping frog (Indirana brachytarsus) and the common frog (Micrixalus fuscus).

== Flora ==
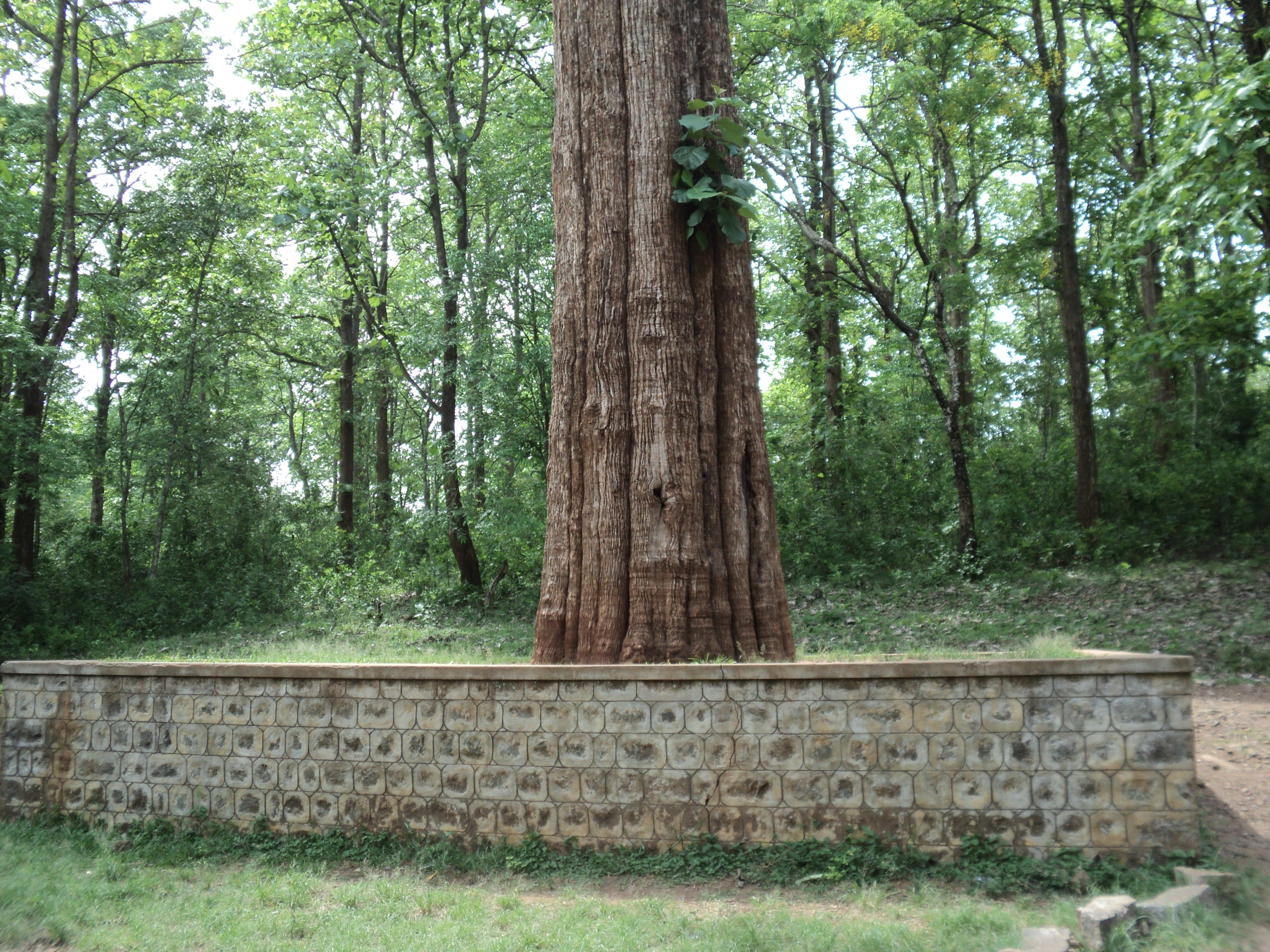
Kannimara Teak

The sanctuary has a variety of trees mainly teak, neem, sandalwood and rosewood. Even the oldest ever teak tree, Kannimara Teak exists here. It is about 450 years old and has a girth of 6.8 metres (22 ft) and a height of 49.5 metres (162 ft). It won the Mahavriksha Puraskar given by the Indian Government. Haplothismia exannulata is a rare species of mycotrophic plant found in this area.

== Threats ==
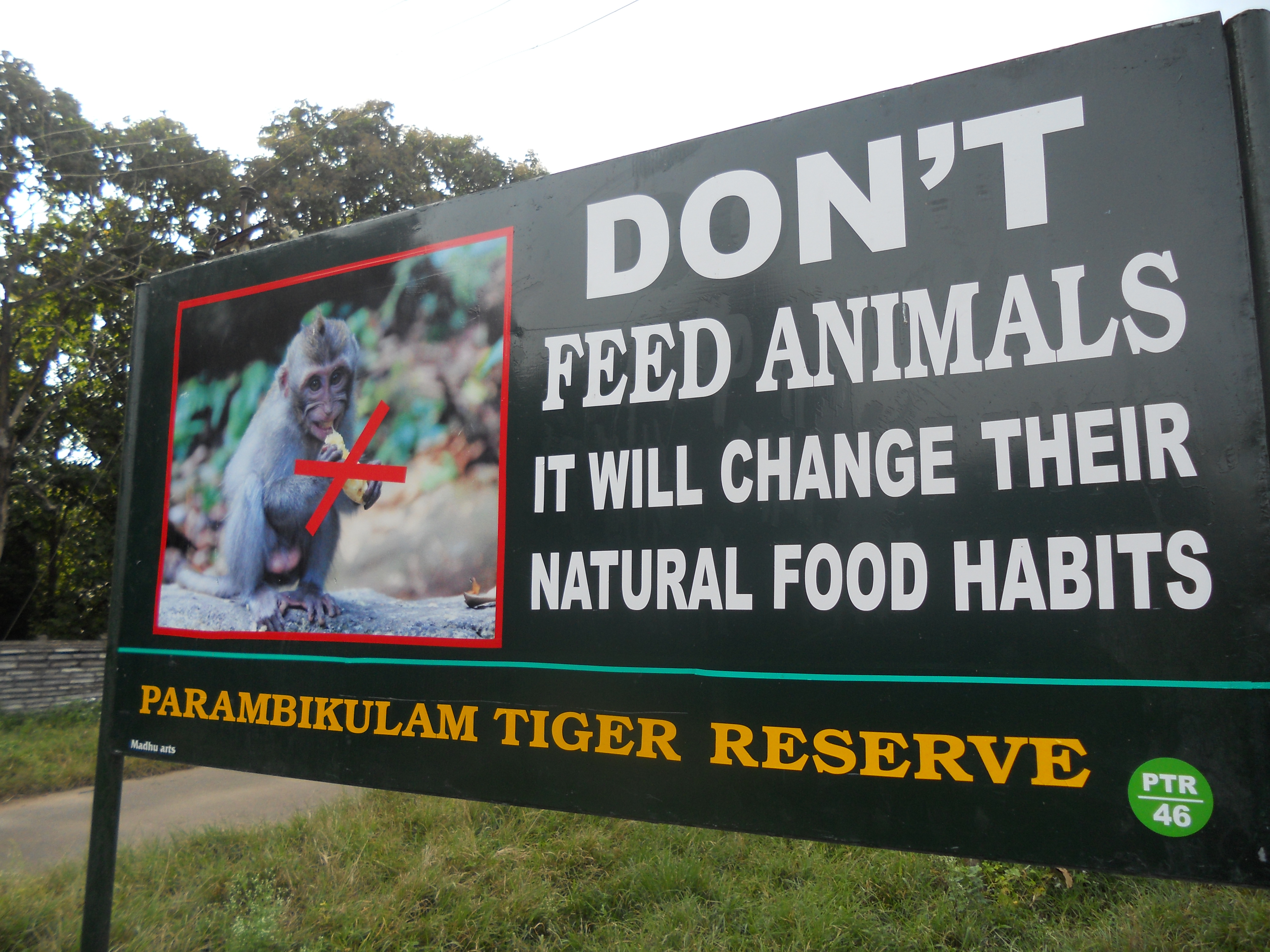
Do-Not-Feed-Animals Signage at Parambikulam Tiger Reserve

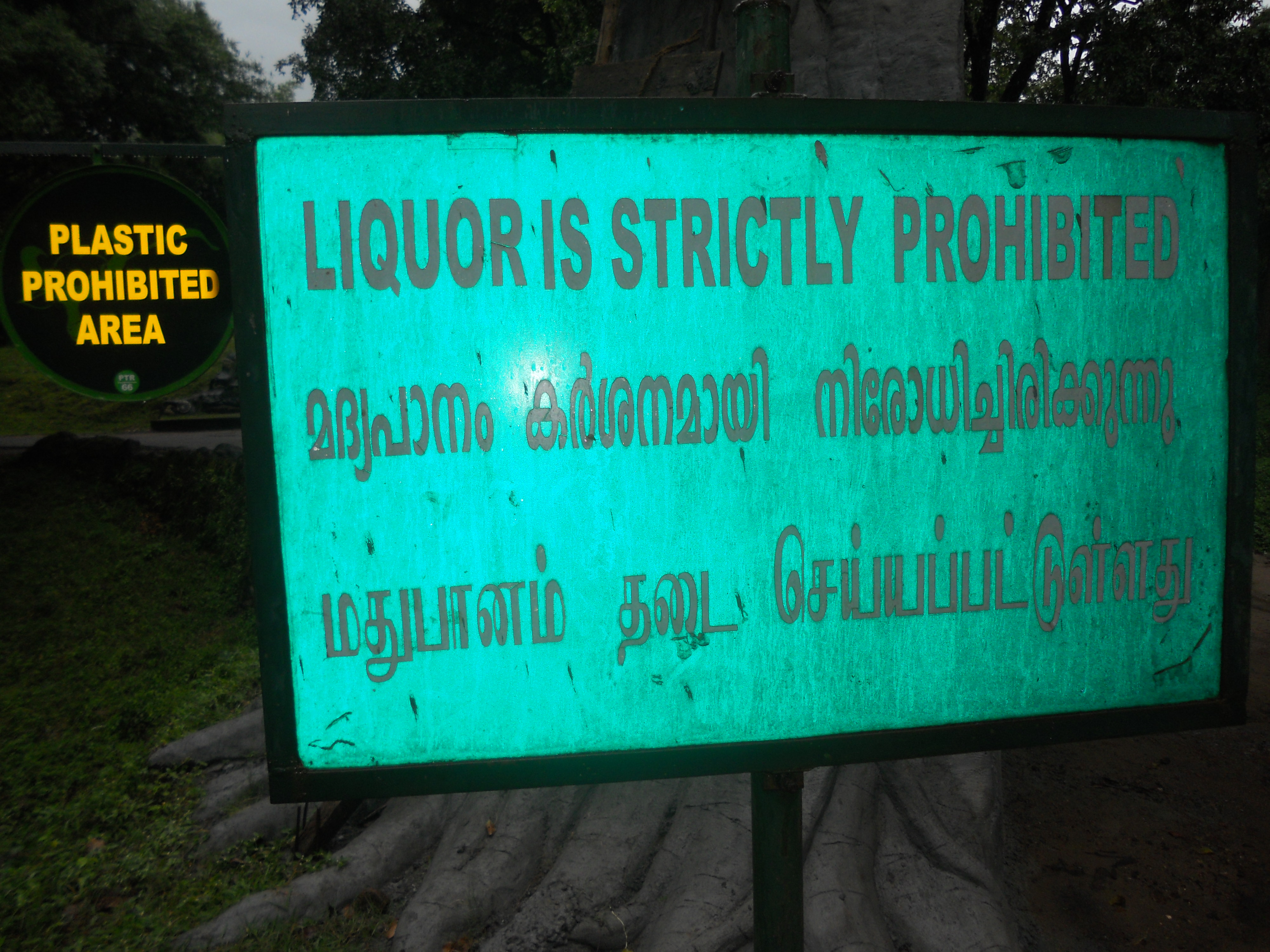
Information signage at Parambikulam Tiger Reserve indicating the prohibition of liquor and plastic.

Fires in the forest - In April 2007 a wild fire in parts of Parambikulam Wildlife Sanctuary and the adjoining Nelliampathy forests destroyed hundreds of acres of forest tracts and plantations. One of the reasons for the fires was the lack of pre-monsoon rain in the area. The area used to get rain in during January, February, March and April. In 2007, there was only 4 mm rain in January and after that there was no rain. Nelliampathy was facing an unprecedented drought during that summer. The temperature reached 34 °C in April when the average high is usually 26 °C.

Waste generation due to tourist visit - Some tourists throw away plastic material, aluminium cans, biscuit wrappers etc. inside the reserve, instead of putting them in waste bins. The staff of the tiger reserve engage in picking up these waste materials on a daily basis. Some of these plastic waste are recycled to make keychains, which are sold at the ecoshops located inside the tiger reserve. These key-chains are referred to as "Pugmark keychains".

Demand for expanding the tourism zone - There is pressure from multiple quarters to expand the tourism activities that is currently conducted in the buffer zone of the tiger reserve. This also results in demand for building new roads inside the tiger reserve, which is not an ecologically friendly option.

Quarrying in nearby areas - Demand for construction material such as granite has resulted in the destruction of hills and hillocks in the peripheral regions such as Nelliyampathy. A ban on quarrying has been sought in regions such as Muthalamada, Chuliar and Seetharkund.

== Sustainability Practices ==
As part of a study to ascertain the visitor management strategy at Parambikulam, a study report by KFRI in 2002 indicated limited tourism with community participation. While questions has been raised about the effectiveness of Eco-Development-Committees (EDCs) in promoting sustainable development at Parambikulam prior to its declaration as a Tiger Reserve after establishment of Parambikulam Tiger Reserve and the Parambikulam Tiger Conservation Foundation, there has also been significant indications that the local community has benefited ed The tiger reserve strives towards ecotourism initiatives that cause minimum harm to the environment. The tiger reserve also promotes the usage of solar energy.

== Awards and Accolades ==
- NatWest Group, Earth Heroes Award, Earth Guardian Award
- CA|TS Accreditation, which is a global recognition for the management effectiveness.
- Award for Community Participation in Ecotourism during the Third Asia Ministerial Conference on Tiger Conservation
