= Indirana sarojamma =

Conservation status
- Near Threatened (IUCN 3.1)

Scientific classification
- Kingdom: Animalia
- Phylum: Chordata
- Class: Amphibia
- Order: Anura
- Family: Ranixalidae
- Genus: Indirana
- Species: I. sarojamma

Binomial name
- Indirana sarojamma Dahanukar, Modak, Krutha, Nameer, Padhye, and Molur, 2016

Species of frog

Indirana sarojamma, or Sarojamma's leaping frog, is a species of frog in the family Ranixalidae. It is endemic to in Kerala, India in the Western Ghat mountains, south of the Palghat Gap.

== Body ==
This is one of the largest frogs in Indirana. It breeds through larval development.

== Habitat ==
This frog inhabits primary and evergreen forests. It is observed on wet rocks and in leaf litter. It has been observed on tree farms, but seems to require some canopy cover. It has been observed between 488 and 1014 meters above sea level.

== Threats ==
The IUCN classifies this frog as near threatened. This frog can be killed by pesticides, but they are only used in some places within its range. Road collisions are also an issue.

Scientists also cite climate change as a threat to this frog because it could alter the monsoon climate that the frog relies upon to breed.

The frog's range includes several protected parks: Kalakad Mundanthurai Tiger Reserve, Neyyar Wildlife Sanctuary, Peppara Wildlife Sanctuary, and Shendurney Wildlife Sanctuary.

Scientists have observed the fungus Batrachochytrium dendrobatidis on other frogs in Indirana, but they do not know how much of a threat it poses to Indirana sarojamma. Batrachochytrium dendrobatidis causes the fungal disease chytridiomycosis.

== Original description ==
- Dahanukar N; Modak N; Krutha K; Nameer PO; Padhye AD; Molur S (2016). "Leaping Frogs (Anura: Ranixalidae) of the Western Ghats of India: an integrated taxonomic review". J Threatened Taxa (Abstract). 8: 9221–9288. doi:10.11609/jott.2532.8.10.9221-9288.
