= Indirana duboisi =

Conservation status
- Near Threatened (IUCN 3.1)

Scientific classification
- Kingdom: Animalia
- Phylum: Chordata
- Class: Amphibia
- Order: Anura
- Family: Ranixalidae
- Genus: Indirana
- Species: I. duboisi

Binomial name
- Indirana duboisi Dahanukar, Modak, Krutha, Nameer, Padhye, and Molur, 2016

Species of frog

Indirana duboisi, the Karnataka leaping frog or Dubois's leaping frog, is a frog. It is endemic to India in the Western Ghat mountains.

== Habitat ==
This frog inhabits secondary forests and in forests with at least some evergreen trees. This frog needs some canopy cover and moist leaf litter. It has been observed on acacia and arecanut plantations. This frog has been observed between 80 and 1042 meters above sea level.

== Reproduction ==
This frog has semi-aquatic tadpoles that live on wet rocks and moss. They move using their strong tails and hind back legs, which grow in sooner than other tadpoles' back legs.

== Threats ==
The IUCN classifies this frog as near threatened. Scientists cite pesticides and habitat loss associated with tourism as threats.

Scientists also name climate change as a possible threat. Alterations to the monsoon climate could cause drying of the moist soil the frog requires.

The frog's range includes protected parks, including Kudremukh National Park, Mookambika Wildlife Sanctuary, and Bhadra Tiger Reserve.

Scientists have observed the fungus Batrachochytrium dendrobatidis on other frogs in Indirana, but they do not know its specific morbidity or mortality. Batrachochytrium dendrobatidis causes the fungal disease chytridiomycosis.

== Original publication ==
- Dahanukar N; Modak N; Krutha K; Nameer PO; Padhye AD; Molur S (2016). "Leaping Frogs (Anura: Ranixalidae) of the Western Ghats of India: an integrated taxonomic review". J Threatened Taxa (Abstract). 8: 9221–9288. doi:10.11609/jott.2532.8.10.9221-9288.
