= Indirana paramakri =

Conservation status
- Endangered (IUCN 3.1)

Scientific classification
- Kingdom: Animalia
- Phylum: Chordata
- Class: Amphibia
- Order: Anura
- Family: Ranixalidae
- Genus: Indirana
- Species: I. paramakri

Binomial name
- Indirana paramakri Garg and Biju, 2016

Species of frog

Indirana paramakri, the rocky terrain leaping frog or Suganthagiri leaping frog, is a frog in the family Ranixalidae. It is endemic to Kerala, India in the Western Ghat mountains.

== Appearance ==
The adult female holotype measured 30.9 mm in snout-vent length. The skin of the dorsum was red-brown in color. There was a dark black-brown stripe from each nostril running past the bottom of each eye over the tympanum to the armpit. The eardrum was black-brown in color. Parts of the lip were interspersed with dark brown and cream-colored stripes. The front and hind legs were red-brown in color with brown marks. Parts of the legs and flanks were gray-brown in color. Her ventrum was gray with some black-brown spots.

== Etymology ==
Scientists named this species paramakri. In the Malayalam language, which is the official language of Kerala, para means "rock" and makri means "frog." This refers to the frog's tendency to inhabit rocky places.

== Habitat ==
People have seen this frog near streams on wet rocks or among the leaf litter. It lives in disturbed areas and is suspected in nearby primary forest. This frog has been observed between 823 and 1100 meters above sea level.

== Reproduction ==
This frog lays eggs on wet rocks. The tadpoles are semi-aquatic and use their strong tails and hind limbs to move. These limbs grow in at a much younger age than those of other frogs' tadpoles.

== Threats ==
The IUCN classifies this frog as endangered because its small range is subject to ongoing degradation. Scientists name pesticides and climate change as threats, specifically drying out of its habitat. Some landslide prevention efforts can also harm this frog: the materials people use to make roads stronger can fill in the cracks in the rocks where frogs would lay their eggs.

Scientists have observed the fungus Batrachochytrium dendrobatidis on other frogs in Indirana, but they do not know its specific morbidity or mortality in this frog. Batrachochytrium dendrobatidis causes the fungal disease chytridiomycosis.

The frog's range contains at least one protected park: Wayanad Wildlife Sanctuary.
