= Indirana gundia =

Conservation status
- Near Threatened (IUCN 3.1)

Scientific classification
- Kingdom: Animalia
- Phylum: Chordata
- Class: Amphibia
- Order: Anura
- Family: Ranixalidae
- Genus: Indirana
- Species: I. gundia

Binomial name
- Indirana gundia (Dubois, 1986)

Species of frog

Indirana gundia is a species of frog found in the Western Ghats of India. It is only known from its type locality, Kempholey, Karnataka. Indirana gundia is listed among "Top 100 EDGE Amphibians". It represents a family that has been evolving independently in India for almost 50 million years.

== Description ==
Indirana gundia are small in size, with a total length of 23–38 mm (0.91–1.50 in). The dorsum is variable in colour, ranging from brown to yellowish, via golden, cream, pinkish and reddish hues, probably providing good camouflage against the background of decaying leaves on the forest floor. Adult frogs have long, muscular legs; the digits on both pairs of limbs are unwebbed but dilated into disc-like suckers. The head is fairly pointed and the skin has longitudinal glandular folds along the back. The mouth is wide and the buccal cavity is whitish or yellowish.

== Reproduction ==
The frog lays eggs on wet rocks. This frog's tadpoles are not fully aquatic. It moves across wet rocks and moss using its tail and hind legs, which grow in at a younger age than those of other tadpoles of other species.

== Habitat ==
This terrestrial frog lives among rocks and leaf litter on the floor of tropical forests. It seems to require some canopy cover and cannot live in fully cleared areas. This frog has been observed between 66 and 1080 meters above sea level.

== Conservation ==
The IUCN classifies this frog as near threatened because while its range is limited and subject to ongoing degradation, it is not heavily fragmented. Humans alter the forests where the frog lives to raise livestock, harvest timber for local use, build roads, and develop infrastructure for tourism. In some areas, coffee cultivation is also an issue. Landslide prevention measures can hurt this frog by changing its the rocky microhabitats.

The frog's range includes some protected parks: Bhadra Tiger Reserve, Kudremukh National Park, Kempholey Reserve Forest, Aralam Wildlife Sanctuary, and Ranipuram Vested Forest .

Scientists have observed the fungus Batrachochytrium dendrobatidis on this frog, but they do not its precise morbidity or mortality. Batrachochytrium dendrobatidis causes the fungal disease chytridiomycosis.
