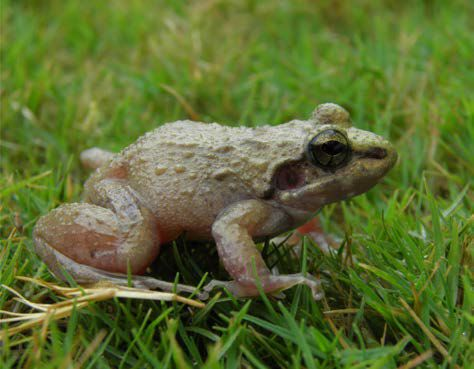
- Female Indirana leithii from Matheran

Conservation status
- Least Concern (IUCN 3.1)

Scientific classification
- Kingdom: Animalia
- Phylum: Chordata
- Class: Amphibia
- Order: Anura
- Family: Ranixalidae
- Genus: Indirana
- Species: I. leithii

Binomial name
- Indirana leithii (Boulenger, 1888)

Synonyms
- Rana leithii Boulenger, 1888; Ranixalus leithii (Boulenger, 1888)

= Indirana leithii =

Leith's leaping frog Indirana leithii

Species of amphibian

Indirana leithii (Leith's leaping frog, Leith's frog, Boulenger's brown frog, Matheran leaping frog, or Matheran Indian frog) is a species of frog in the family Ranixalidae. It is endemic to the northern Western Ghats of India. As currently defined, its range is restricted to the states of Maharashtra and southern Gujarat; earlier records elsewhere refer to other species.

== Etymology ==
The specific name leithii honours Andrew Henderson Leith, a physician who worked as Sanitary Commissioner in Bombay.

== Description ==
Adult males measure 19–29 mm (0.7–1.1 in) and adult females 24–36 mm (0.9–1.4 in) in snout–vent length. The tympanum is two-thirds of the eye diameter; a strong supra-tympanic fold runs from the eye to the shoulder. The fingers and toes bear enlarged discs; the toes are two-thirds webbed. Dorsal skin is rough with number of folds. Colouration is brownish with many, closely set black spots. The limbs are cross-barred. The venter is white while the throat is finely mottled with brown.

The following description is adopted from George Albert Boulenger's "Fauna of British India":

Vomerine teeth in two oblique groups are set just behind the level of the choanae. A free, pointed papilla sits on the middle of the tongue. The head is moderate; the snout is obtuse, with obtuse canthus rostralis and concave loreal region; the nostril is nearer to the end of the snout than to the eye; the interorbital space is a little narrower than the upper eyelid; the tympanum is distinct, two thirds the diameter of the eye. The fingers are moderate, the first extending not quite as for as second; the toes are two-thirds webbed, the web reaching the disks of the third and fifth toes; tips of fingers and toes dilated into small but well-developed disks; subarticular tubercles moderate; a single, small, oval inner metatarsal tubercle; no tarsal fold is present. The tibio-tarsal articulation reaches halfway between the eye and the end of the snout. The skin of the back has small scattered longitudinal warts; a strong fold runs from the eye to the shoulder. It is brown above, with small dark spots; limbs with dark transverse bands; lower parts white, throat mottled with brown. From snout to vent 1.25 inches.

This frog has no call within the human audible range.

== Habitat ==
This frog lives in the northern part of the Western Ghats. It is a terrestrial species, inhabiting evergreen and partially evergreen forests near basalt cliffs. It has been observed on the ground near streams and in cracks in rocks or among the leaf litter. This frog has been observed between 25 and 1329 meters above sea level.

During the breeding period, the frogs convene in caverns, sometimes in great numbers. The frog lays eggs on wet rocks or in cracks in rocks. The tadpoles use their mouths to adhere to the rocks, where they eat algae. The tadpoles are only semi-aquatic. The hind legs grow in at an earlier age than on the tadpoles of other species.

The frog's range includes several protected parks: Bhimashankar Wildlife Sanctuary, Kalsubai Harishchandragad Wildlife Sanctuary, Tamhini-Sudhagad Wildlife Sanctuary, Phansad Wildlife Sanctuary, Sahyadri Tiger Reserve, and Vansda National Park.

== Diet ==
The adult frog eats ants, grubs, and hemipterans. The tadpoles eat algae.

== Threats ==
Scientists believe this frog is not in danger of dying out, but it is in some danger from habitat loss due to the conversion of forest to agriculture and infrastructure construction. Anti-landslide measures involving shortcrete can harm this frog by filling in the cracks in the rocks where frogs would lay their eggs. Wood harvesting at a subsistence level also poses some threat, but a minor one.

Scientists also think climate change could hurt this frog. Because climate change has changed the weather, some of these frogs have dried out and died.

Scientists have seen the fungus Batrachochytrium dendrobatidis on this frog, but they do not know its specific morbidity or mortality. Batrachochytrium dendrobatidis causes the fungal disease chytridiomycosis.
