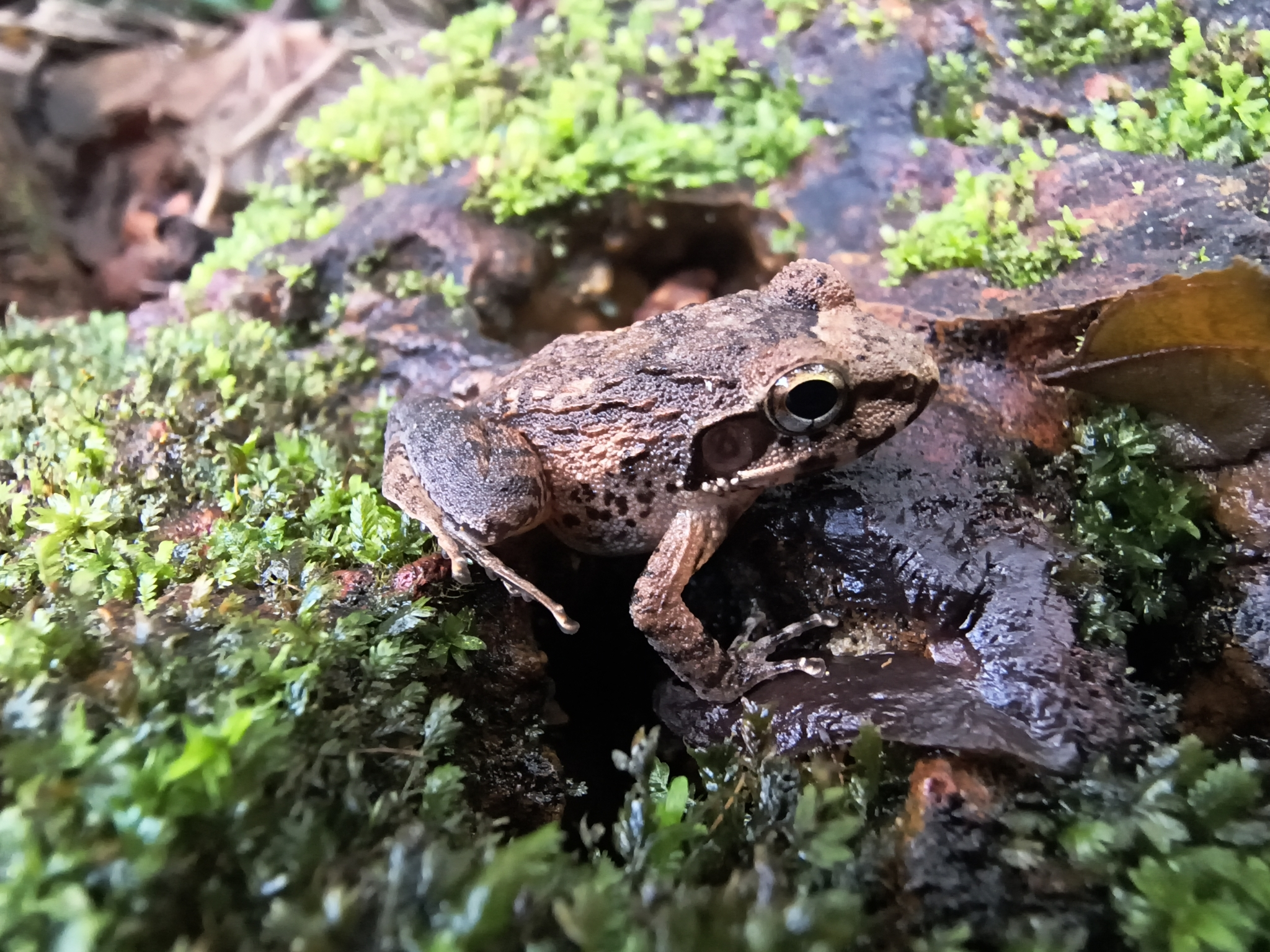

Conservation status
- Vulnerable (IUCN 3.1)

Scientific classification
- Kingdom: Animalia
- Phylum: Chordata
- Class: Amphibia
- Order: Anura
- Family: Ranixalidae
- Genus: Indirana
- Species: I. salelkari

Binomial name
- Indirana salelkari Modak, Dahanukar, Gosavi, and Padhye, 2015

= Indirana salelkari =

Species of frog

Indirana salelkari, the Netravali leaping frog, is a species of frog in the family Ranixalidae. It is endemic to India's Western Ghat mountains.

== Appearance ==
The adult male frog measures 24.7–27.7 mm in snout-vent length and the adult female frog 30.0–30.9 mm. The head is longer than it is wide, which distinguishes this frog from other species in Indirana. The skin of the dorsum is brown or pink in color. There is a dark stripe between the eyes. There is a patch in the shape of the letter W on the anterior head. There are brown stripes on the upper mandible and another brown strip from the nose to the shoulder. There are transverse bars on the front and hind legs and sometimes the toes. The sides of the legs have brown or black spots on them. Female frogs have fewer spots than male frogs. The skin of the bottoms of the feet is dark brown and white in color.

== Habitat ==
This frog lives in semi-evergreen secondary forest within the splash zones of streams. This frog has been observed near spice farms and in the edges of forests, but scientists believe it does require some canopy cover. This frog has been observed between 78 and 600 meters above sea level.

== Reproduction ==
The frog's tadpoles are semi-aquatic. A horny beak divides the mouth into two parts.

== Threats ==
The IUCN classifies this frog as vulnerable because of its limited range and ongoing habitat loss. People cut down the forests for agriculture and to build towns. Some forms of landslide prevention can harm this frog: concrete can fill in the cracks in the rocks where frogs would lay their eggs. Subsistence logging may also pose some threat, but a minor one. Scientists also think climate change could hurt this frog by changing the weather it needs to lay eggs.

The frog's range includes at least one protected park: Netravali Wildlife Sanctuary.

Scientists have observed the fungus Batrachochytrium dendrobatidis on other frogs that live nearby but further research is required to assess it as a threat. Batrachochytrium dendrobatidis causes the fungal disease chytridiomycosis.

== Original description ==
- Modak N; Dahanukar N; Gosavi N; Padhye AD (2015). "Indirana salelkari, a new species of leaping frog (Anura: Ranixalidae) from Western Ghas of Goa, India". J Threatened Taxa. 7 (9): 7493–7509. doi:10.11609/JoTT.o4262.7493-509.
