= Indirana yadera =

Conservation status
- Vulnerable (IUCN 3.1)

Scientific classification
- Kingdom: Animalia
- Phylum: Chordata
- Class: Amphibia
- Order: Anura
- Family: Ranixalidae
- Genus: Indirana
- Species: I. yadera

Binomial name
- Indirana yadera Dahanukar, Modak, Krutha, Nameer, Padhye, and Molur, 2016

Species of frog

Indirana yadera, the Yadera leaping frog, is a frog in the family Ranixalidae. It is endemic to India's Western Ghat mountains.

== Appearance ==
This frog has several features that differentiate it from its congeners, including a head wider than it is long, a long, narrow snout, and a distinctive tympanum.

== Etymology ==
The scientists who first described this frog named it some of their friends: yadera for Yamini, Deepa, and Ravisankaran.

== Habitat ==
This frog inhabits moist lowland and submontane forests. It can live in secondary forest, near streams and stagnant water. It appears to need both moist ground, moist leaf litter, and some canopy cover. So while it cannot live in clear-cut areas, it has been observed on arecanut plantations. It has been observed between 55 and 1075 meters above sea level.

== Reproduction ==
The frog lays eggs on wet rocks. This frog's tadpoles are semi-aquatic and move across wet rocks and moss using their tails and their hind legs. Their back legs grow in at a younger age than other tadpoles' do.

== Threats ==
The IUCN classifies this frog as vulnerable to extinction because of its small range. Sometimes people hit this frog with cars or trucks. Pesticides and fertilizers may also be an issue. Efforts to stop landslides may harm the frog as well: the concrete used to shore up roads can fill in the cracks in the rocks where frogs would lay their eggs.

Scientists also cite climate change as a threat to this frog. Alterations to the monsoon climate could interfere with breeding.

The frog's range includes protected parks: Peechi-Vazhani Wildlife Sanctuary, Periyar Tiger Reserve, Idukki Wildlife Sanctuary, Chimmony Wildlife Sanctuary, and Neyyar Wildlife Sanctuary.

Scientists have observed the fungus Batrachochytrium dendrobatidis on this frog, but they do not know its specific morbidity or mortality. Batrachochytrium dendrobatidis causes the fungal disease chytridiomycosis.

== Original description ==
- Dahanukar N; Modak N; Krutha K; Nameer PO; Padhye AD; Molur S (2016). "Leaping Frogs (Anura: Ranixalidae) of the Western Ghats of India: an integrated taxonomic review". J Threatened Taxa. 8: 9221–9288.
