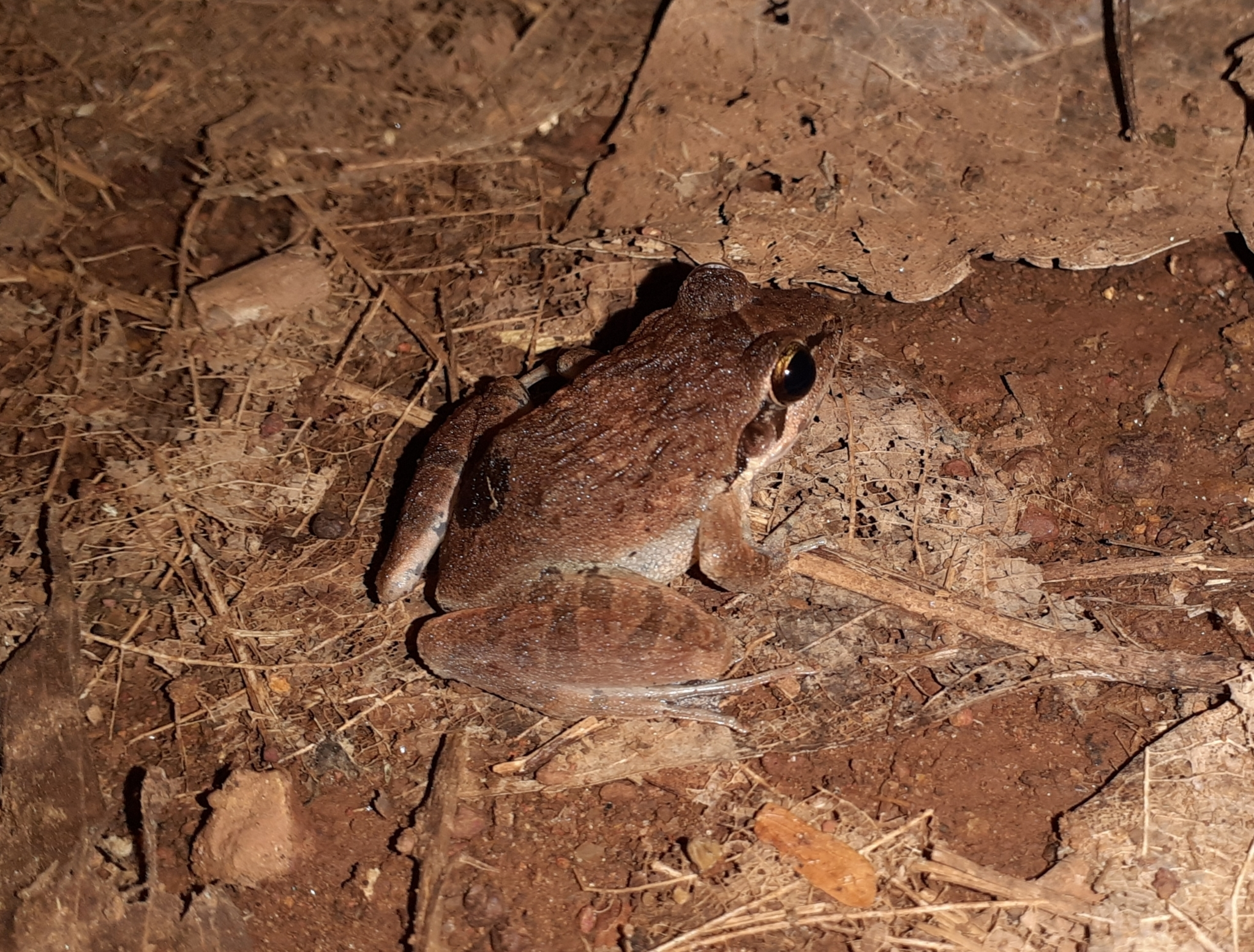

Conservation status
- Vulnerable (IUCN 3.1)

Scientific classification
- Kingdom: Animalia
- Phylum: Chordata
- Class: Amphibia
- Order: Anura
- Family: Ranixalidae
- Genus: Indirana
- Species: I. tysoni

Binomial name
- Indirana tysoni Dahanukar, Modak, Krutha, Nameer, Padhye & Molur, 2016

= Indirana tysoni =

Species of frog

Indirana tysoni, also known by its common name Tyson's leaping frog, is a species from the genus Indirana. The species was originally described in 2016 by Neelesh Dahanukar, Nikhil Modak, Keerthi Krutha, P. O. Nameer, Anand D. Padhye, and Sanjay Molur.

== Appearance ==
The adult male frog has at least three different color morphs.

== Habitat ==
Indirana tysoni has been observed in Kerala, India in the Western Ghat mountains.

This frog lives in primary forest and in secondary forests but does not seem to tolerate total canopy loss. This frog has been observed on moss on rocks and on leaf litter, near houses, and on arecanut plantations. This frog has been observed between 826 and 1123 meters above sea level.

== Reproduction ==
Some adult males have been observed near the egg clutches, possibly guarding them. The tadpoles are semi-aquatic and do not live in the water. Instead, they move across mossy rocks using their strong tails and hind legs, which grow in at a younger age than those of other tadpoles.

== Etymology ==
The frog is named after Neil deGrasse Tyson to acknowledge his role in popularising and communicating science to the general public.

== Threats ==
The IUCN classifies this frog as vulnerable to extinction. They cite pesticides as a principal threat to this frog. Road collisions are also an issue. People also remove the dead leaves and rocks that the frog needs.

Scientists also cite climate change as a threat because it could change the monsoon weather pattern that the frog needs to lay eggs.

The frog's range includes at least one protected park: Someshwara Wildlife Sanctuary.

Scientists have observed the fungus Batrachochytrium dendrobatidis on other frogs in Indirana, but its exact morbidity and mortality have yet to be determined. Batrachochytrium dendrobatidis causes the fungal disease chytridiomycosis.
