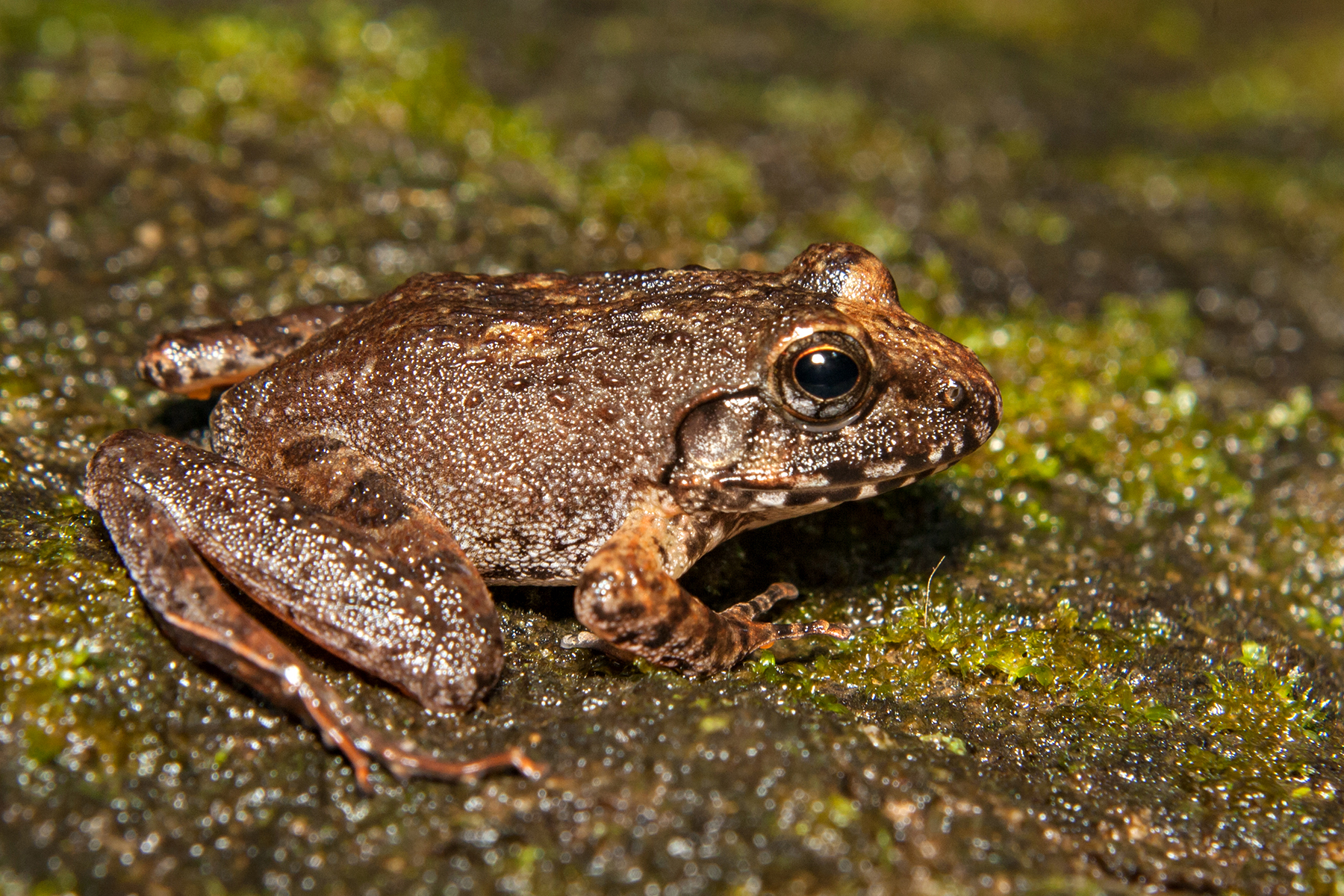

Conservation status
- Least Concern (IUCN 3.1)

Scientific classification
- Kingdom: Animalia
- Phylum: Chordata
- Class: Amphibia
- Order: Anura
- Family: Ranixalidae
- Genus: Indirana
- Species: I. brachytarsus

Binomial name
- Indirana brachytarsus (Günther, 1876)

= Indirana brachytarsus =

Species of frog

Indirana brachytarsus is a species of frog found in the Western Ghats (including the Anaimalai Hills) of India.

== Habitat ==
This frog lives on the ground in evergreen and mixed evergreen forests near streams on hills between 600 and 1508 meters above sea level. It tends to be found among the leaf litter. This frog has been observed near the edges of the forest but not in fully open areas. It has been observed on cardamom, rubber, and tea plantations.

The frog's range includes several protected parks: Periyar Tiger Reserve, Kalakad Mundanthurai Tiger Reserve, Meghamalai Wildlife Sanctuary, Agasthyamala Biosphere Reserve, Anamalai Tiger Reserve, and Wayanad Wildlife Sanctuary.

== Reproduction ==
The frog lays eggs on wet rocks. This frog's tadpoles are semi-aquatic and move across wet rocks and moss using their tails and their hind legs, which grow in at a younger age than those of tadpoles of other species.

== Threats ==
The IUCN classifies this frog as least concern of extinction, but it is in some danger from deforestation associated with agriculture, dam construction, and other infrastructure. Some landslide prevention efforts can harm this frog: the concrete people use to strengthen roads can fill in the cracks in the rocks where frogs would lay their eggs. Subsistence wood harvesting may also pose some threat, but only a minor one.

Scientists also cite climate change as a threat. Because the frog lives at high elevations, it cannot readily migrate to cooler habitats.

Scientists have observed the fungus Batrachochytrium dendrobatidis on this frog, but they do not know its specific morbidity or mortality. Batrachochytrium dendrobatidis causes the fungal disease chytridiomycosis.
