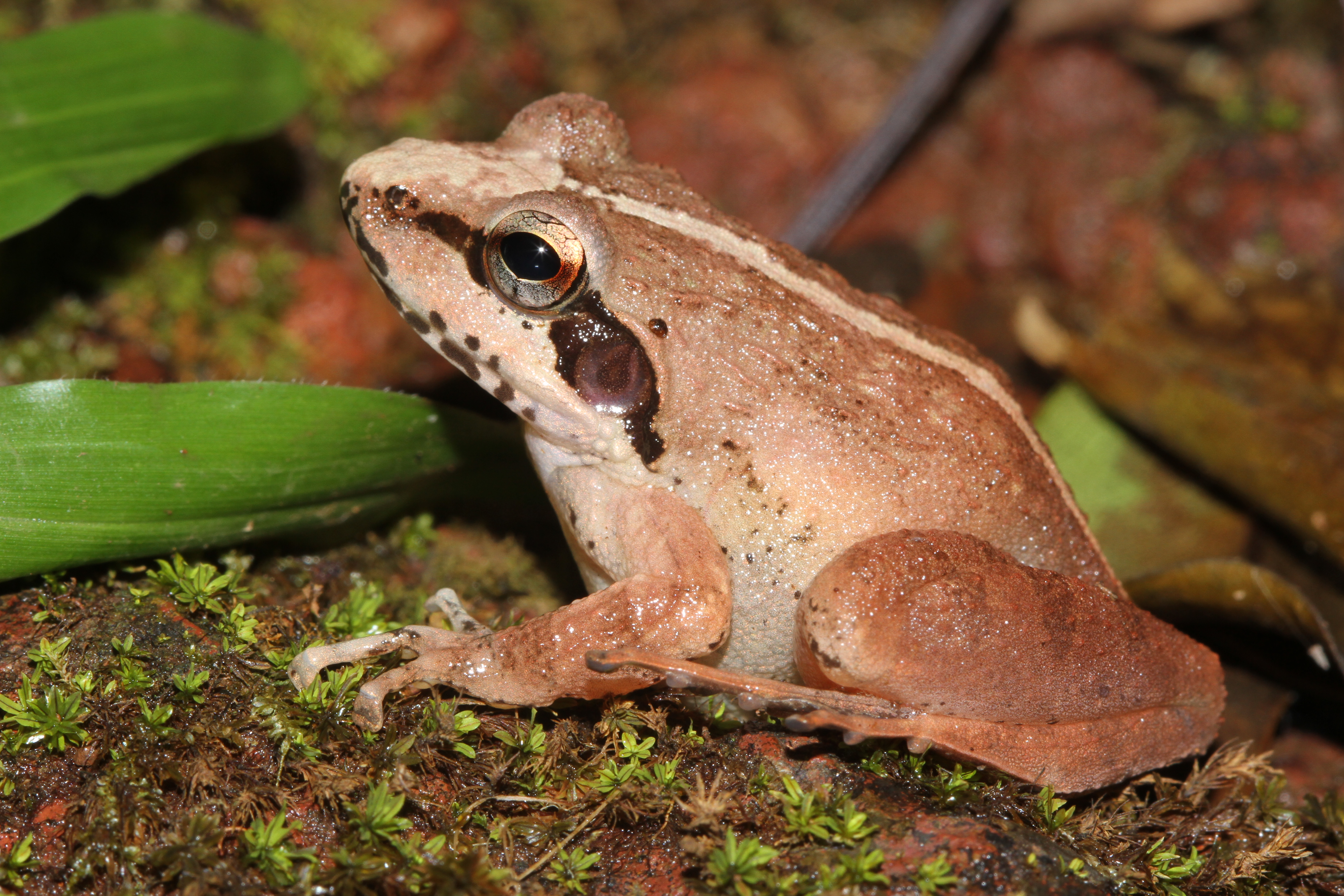

Conservation status
- Least Concern (IUCN 3.1)

Scientific classification
- Kingdom: Animalia
- Phylum: Chordata
- Class: Amphibia
- Order: Anura
- Family: Ranixalidae
- Genus: Indirana
- Species: I. chiravasi

Binomial name
- Indirana chiravasi Padhye, Modak, and Dahanukar, 2014

= Indirana chiravasi =

Amboli leaping frog

Species of amphibian

Indirana chiravasi (common name: Amboli leaping frog) is a species of frog endemic to the Western Ghats of India. It is only known from its type locality, the laterite plateaus by the hill-station of Amboli, Maharashtra. It was described in 2014 by a team of three scientists from IISER, Pune and MES Abasaheb Garware College.

Indirana chiravasi is only known from Amboli, Maharashtra.

== Description ==
Males measure 25–27 mm (0.98–1.06 in) and females 32–39 mm (1.3–1.5 in) in snout–vent length. The skin is smooth except on the sides that are granular; there are few longitudinal folds on dorsal side. Dorsal colour is olive brown with scattered yellow markings and, in males only, densely organized black spots comprising a W-shaped marking. There is a black strip running from tip of snout to shoulder through eye and tympanum. The fingers are unwebbed whereas the toes are moderately webbed.

== Habitat ==
Indirana chiravasi inhabit lateritic rocky outcrops and occur in a variety of microhabitats. They are often found in the crevices of the laterite boulders; males are mostly seen while calling from the wet rocks or moss-covered boulders. Females have been found under a log in the forest and from under a roadside stone. This frog has been observed between 26 and 998 meters above sea level.

== Reproduction ==
The tadpoles are terrestrial and have been observed feeding on algal matter on wet boulders. They move across wet rocks using their tails and hind limbs, which grow in at a younger age than those of the tadpoles of other species.

== Conservation and threats ==
The IUCN classifies this frog as least concern of extinction, but it is in some danger, largely from habitat loss. Humans build roads, mine ores, and establish cashew plantations. In some places, illegal tree harvesting is also an issue. Pesticides can also kill this frog. Climate change could harm this frog by changing the monsoon climate that it relies on to breed. Some landslide prevention measures can harm this frog; shortcrete can fill in the cracks in the rocks where frogs would lay their eggs.

The frog's range includes at least four protected parks: Phansad Wildlife Sanctuary, Sahyadri Tiger Reserve and its buffer zone, Tamhini Wildlife Sanctuary, and Kali Tiger Reserve.
