= Indirana tenuilingua =

Conservation status
- Data Deficient (IUCN 3.1)

Scientific classification
- Kingdom: Animalia
- Phylum: Chordata
- Class: Amphibia
- Order: Anura
- Family: Ranixalidae
- Genus: Indirana
- Species: I. tenuilingua

Binomial name
- Indirana tenuilingua (Rao, 1937)

Synonyms
- Rana (Discodeles) tenuilingua Rao, 1937; Ranixalus tenuilingua (Rao, 1937)

Species of amphibian

Indirana tenuilingua is a species of frog that is considered nomen inquirendum. It is only known from the type series, now lost, from its type locality, Kemphole (also spelled "Kempholey"), in the Western Ghats of India. It is sometimes known as Rao's Indian frog or slender-tongued frog.

== Taxonomic status ==
This species was described by C. R. Narayan Rao based on specimens collected from "Kemphole Ghats, Hassan, Mysore, South India". These are now believed to be lost. The original description is not adequate to diagnose the species and contains several inconsistencies. Attempts to collect new specimens from the type locality have been unsuccessful, and it is not possible to relate this taxon to other Indirana. For these reasons, it has been placed incertae sedis under Indirana, or relegated to nomen inquirendum.

== Habitat and conservation ==
The types were collected from about 400 m (1,300 ft) above sea level. There is no further information on habitat of Indirana tenuilingua. Because of its uncertain taxonomic status and lack of ecological information, the IUCN Red List of Threatened Species lists it as data deficient.
