= Indirana longicrus =

Conservation status
- Data Deficient (IUCN 3.1)

Scientific classification
- Kingdom: Animalia
- Phylum: Chordata
- Class: Amphibia
- Order: Anura
- Family: Ranixalidae
- Genus: Indirana
- Species: I. longicrus

Binomial name
- Indirana longicrus (Rao, 1937)

Species of frog

Indirana longicrus is a species of frog found in the Western Ghats of India. It is only known from its type locality, Kempholey, Karnataka.

The habitat preferences of this species are not known, although it is possibly a forest species that presumably breeds like other members of the genus, with larvae being found on wet rocks next to streams.

== Major threats ==
The area where it was collected, and might possibly still occur, is threatened by clearance for agricultural use.
