= Indirana bhadrai =

Conservation status
- Data Deficient (IUCN 3.1)

Scientific classification
- Kingdom: Animalia
- Phylum: Chordata
- Class: Amphibia
- Order: Anura
- Family: Ranixalidae
- Genus: Indirana
- Species: I. bhadrai

Binomial name
- Indirana bhadrai Garg and Biju, 2016

Species of frog

Indirana bhadrai, the Bhadra leaping frog, is a species of frog in the family Ranixalidae. It is endemic to India's Western Ghat mountains, north of the Palged Gap.

The adult male frog averages 30.2 mm in snout-vent length and the adult female frog 38.7 mm. The skin of the dorsum is light brown in color with darker brown marks. There is a gray-brown mark between the eyes. The snout is lighter in color than the back. There is a black-brown mark from the tip of the nose to the eye to the armpit. The tympanum is gray-brown in color. All four legs and the sides of the body are yellow-brown in color. The belly is light gray with dark gray spots.

This frog has been observed in secondary forest and near coffee farms, among the leaf litter. It has been seen 1176 meters above sea level.

Scientists infer that this frog breeds through larval development, like other frogs in Indirana.

The IUCN classifies this species as data deficient. Its range includes at least one protected park, Bhadra Wildlife Sanctuary, but most of the population lives elsewhere.

The frog's Latin name refers to the Bhadra Wildlife Sanctuary.
