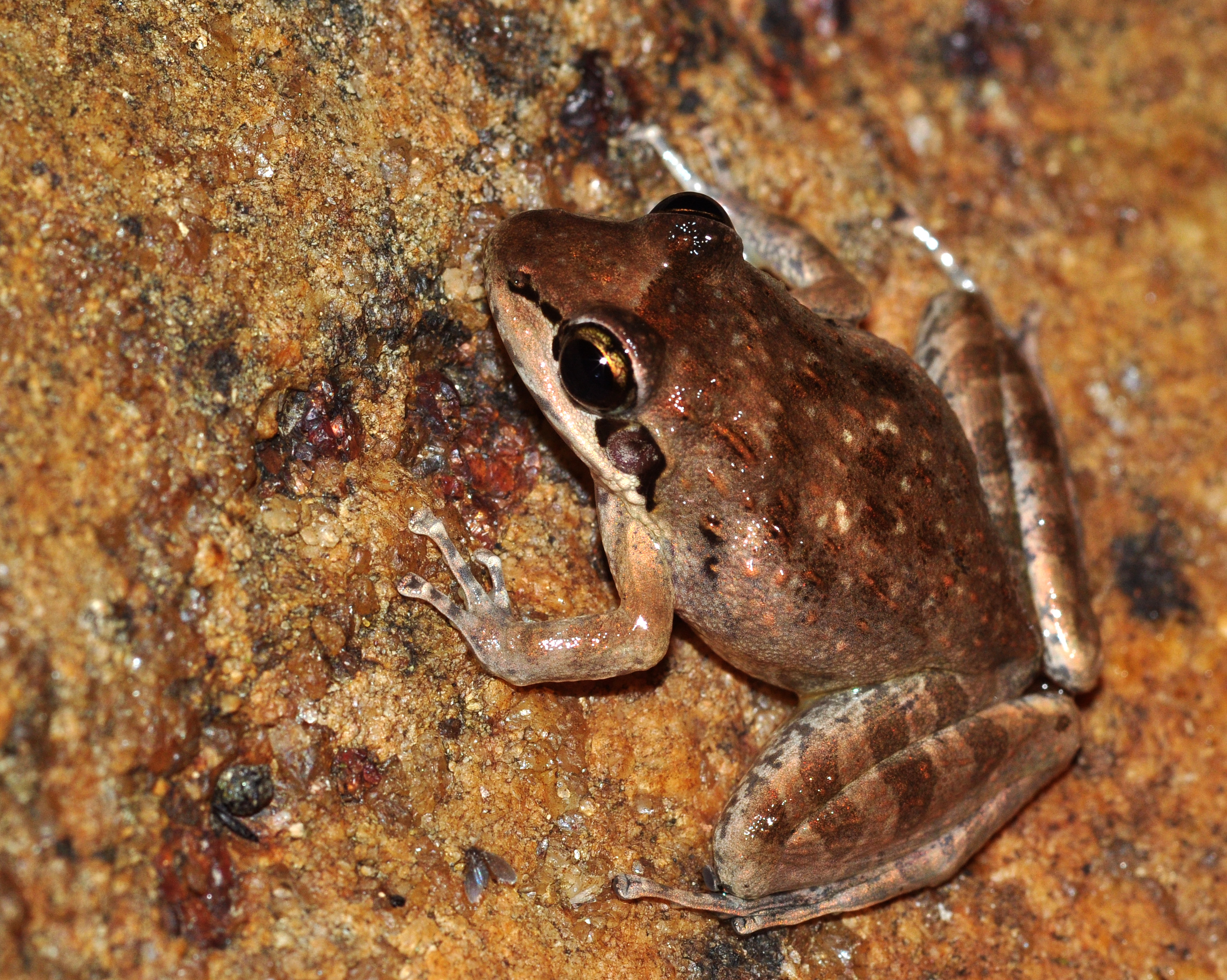
- Dorsal view

Conservation status
- Endangered (IUCN 3.1)

Scientific classification
- Kingdom: Animalia
- Phylum: Chordata
- Class: Amphibia
- Order: Anura
- Family: Ranixalidae
- Genus: Indirana
- Species: I. beddomii

Binomial name
- Indirana beddomii (Günther, 1876)

Synonyms
- Polypedates beddomii Günther, 1876

= Indirana beddomii =

Species of amphibian

Indirana beddomii, Beddome's leaping frog, Beddome's Indian frog, or simply Beddome's frog, is a species of frog found in the Western Ghats. They are usually detected by their long leaps as they flush from the ground when disturbed. The species is named after the naturalist Richard Henry Beddome.

== Description ==
Vomerine teeth in two oblique groups are found just behind the level of the choanae. A free, pointed papilla is on the middle of the tongue. The head is moderate, and the snout is obtuse, with an obtuse canthus rostralis and a concave loreal region. The nostril is a little nearer to the end of the snout than to the eye; the interorbital space is as broad as the upper eyelid, or a little narrower; the tympanum is distinct, two-thirds of the diameter of the eye. The front toes are moderate, with the first extending slightly beyond the second; the hind toes are two-thirds webbed, with the web reaching the disks of the third and fifth toes; the tips of the toes are dilated into well-developed disks; the subarticular tubercles are well developed. A single, small, oval inner metatarsal tubercle is present, with no tarsal fold. The tibiotarsal articulation reaches the tip of the snout or a little beyond. The skin of the back has short longitudinal glandular folds, with a strong fold from the eye to the shoulder. Their color is brown above, with rather indistinct darker spots; rarely, they are uniform pinkish, sometimes with a light vertebral band; a dark cross-band occurs between the eyes; a black band is found along the canthus rostralis, and a black temporal spot is seen. Its limbs are more or less distinctly cross-barred; the lower parts are uniformly whitish. Males are without vocal sacs. Their length from snout to vent is about 2.5 in.

== Distribution and habitat ==
This species is found in the forests of the Western Ghats. This frog lives on the ground near or in riparian habitats in evergreen and mixed evergreen forests between 752 and 1200 meters above sea level. This frog can live in secondary forest but scientists consider it unlikely that it can survive in heavily disturbed habitats. This frog has not been observed on farms.

== Reproduction ==
This frog lays eggs on wet cliffs in cracks in rocks. This frog's tadpoles live in these cracks rather than directly in the water.

== Threats and conservation ==
The IUCN classifies this frog as endangered because of its small range. That range contains at least one protected park, Malabar Wildlife Sanctuary, where approximately 50% of the frogs are estimated to live.

Other threats to this frog include road collisions and habitat loss from conversion of forest to agriculture and the building of dams and linear infrastructure. Landslide prevention that involves shoring up roadsides with concrete can fill in the cracks that the frogs would use to breed. There is small-scale wood collection, but this is only a minor threat. It is possible that noise pollution interferes with the frog's breeding behavior by obscuring the sound of males calling.

Scientists also cite climate change as a potential threat. Because of its high-elevation habitat, the frog could not easily migrate to cooler areas. Climate change might also change the monsoon weather cycle that this frog needs to breed.

Scientists have observed the fungus Batrachochytrium dendrobatidis on this frog, but they do not know its precise morbidity or mortality. Batrachochytrium dendrobatidis causes the fungal disease chytridiomycosis.
