= Walkerana leptodactyla =

Conservation status
- Vulnerable (IUCN 3.1)

Scientific classification
- Kingdom: Animalia
- Phylum: Chordata
- Class: Amphibia
- Order: Anura
- Family: Ranixalidae
- Genus: Walkerana
- Species: W. leptodactyla

Binomial name
- Walkerana leptodactyla (Boulenger, 1882)

Synonyms
- Indirana leptodactyla (Boulenger, 1882)

Species of amphibian

Walkerana leptodactyla is a species of frog endemic to the southern Western Ghats in Kerala and Tamil Nadu states of southern India. Precise reports are from Anaimalai hills, Palni hills, Meghamalai, Travancore hills and Agasthyamalai.

== Description ==
Vomerine teeth in two oblique groups just behind the level of the choanae. A free, pointed papilla on the middle of the tongue. Head moderate, rather depressed; snout blunt, with moderate canthus rostralis; interorbital space as broad as, or a little narrower than, the upper eyelid; tympanum distinct, half the diameter of the eye. lingers moderate, first not extending as far as second; toes one-third or one-fourth webbed; tips of fingers and toes dilated into small but well-developed disks; subarticular tubercles well developed; a small, oval, inner metatarsal tubercle; no tarsal fold. Tibio-tarsal articulation reaching the tip of the snout or beyond. Skin of the back with short longitudinal glandular folds; a fold from the eye to the shoulder. Olive or brownish above, mottled with darker; a more or less distinct subtriangular dark spot between the eyes, often limited in front by a light cross band; sometimes a light vertebral band; a black band along the canthus rostralis, and a black temporal spot; limbs cross-barred; beneath, immaculate or spotted with brown, sometimes brown dotted with white. From snout to vent 1.3 inches.

== Habitat ==
This frog has been observed exclusively in forests, though some have been found where forest meets specific types of farms, such as tea plantations. It is terrestrial, often found among leaf litter. This frog has been observed between 1000 and 2310 meters above sea level.

== Life cycle ==
The frog lays eggs on wet rocks. This frog's tadpoles are not free-swimming. Rather, they live on the surfaces of wet rocks and on moss, moving using their strong tails and hind legs, which grow in at a younger age than those of tadpoles of other species.

== Threats ==
Scientists classify this frog as vulnerable to extinction because of its small range. At least four the places within this range are protected parks: Periyar Tiger Reserve, Kalakad Mundanthurai Tiger Reserve, Anamalai Tiger Reserve, and Eravikulam National Park. Because many former forested areas have been cut down, the frogs in the remaining patches cannot move between sites. Land conversion to agriculture also poses some threat. Landslide prevention involving shortcrete to shore up roadsides can fill in the cracked rock that the frogs need to breed.

Scientists have seen the fungus Batrachochytrium dendrobatidis on this frog, but they do not know its mortality or morbidity. Batrachochytrium dendrobatidis causes the fungal disease chytridiomycosis.
