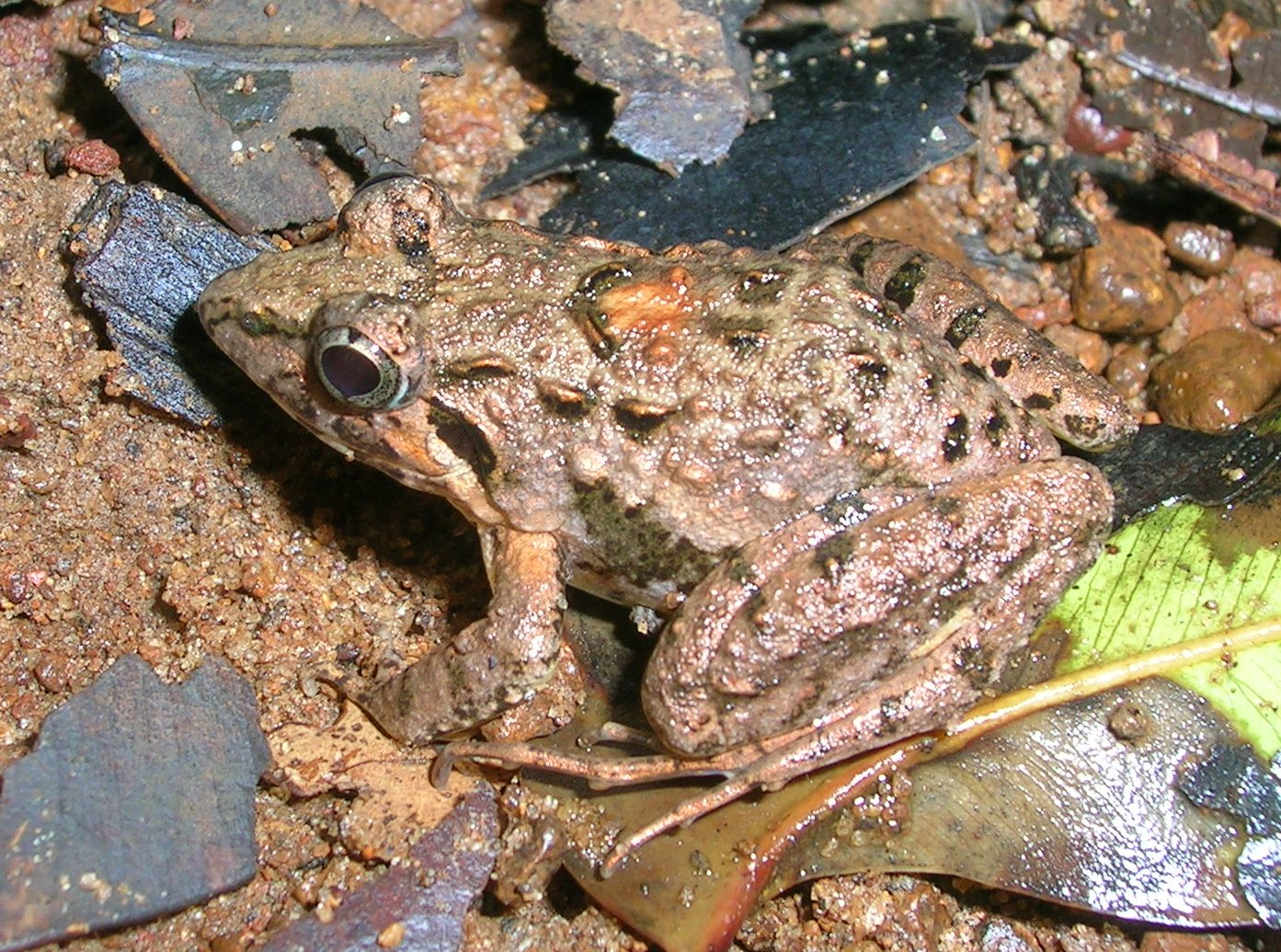

Conservation status
- Least Concern (IUCN 3.1)

Scientific classification
- Kingdom: Animalia
- Phylum: Chordata
- Class: Amphibia
- Order: Anura
- Family: Dicroglossidae
- Genus: Minervarya
- Species: M. keralensis

Binomial name
- Minervarya keralensis (Dubois, 1981)
- Range of F. keralensis in the Western Ghats

Synonyms
- Rana verrucosa Günther, 1876; Rana keralensis Dubois, 1981; Limnonectes keralensis (Dubois, 1981); Fejervarya keralensis (Dubois, 1981) Zakerana keralensis (Dubois, 1981)

= Minervarya keralensis =

Species of frog

Minervarya keralensis (common names: verrucose frog, Kerala wart(y) frog, or Dubois' hill frog) is a species of frog from India. Originally described by Albert Günther in 1876, its present-day specific epithet, keralensis, meaning "of Kerala", was introduced as replacement name by Alain Dubois in 1981.

== Description ==
This species has vomerine teeth in two strong oblique series starting from the inner anterior corners of the choanae. The head is moderately sized with the snout appearing pointed. The inter-orbital space is two-thirds the width of the upper eyelid. The tympanum is distinct and is about three-quarters the diameter of the eye. Fingers are moderate, obtuse and the first extends beyond the second. Toes are moderately well developed and nearly entirely webbed. Sub-articular tubercles are prominent and the inner metatarsal tubercle is oval, compressed and less than half as long as the first toe. It also has a small rounded outer metatarsal tubercle. When the hind leg is pulled forward, the tibio-tarsal articulation reaches the tip of the snout. Upper parts have numerous very prominent warts and short glandular folds. Grey or brown above, darker spotted; hinder side of thighs black, white-marbled; sometimes a broad light vertebral band. Male has two internal vocal sacs.

From snout-to-vent length about 2.75 in (7.0 cm).

== Distribution and habitat ==
Minervarya keralensis is found in the Western Ghats in southern India. Its type locality is "Malabar". Minervarya keralensis has also been reported from Gujarat, northwestern India, and possibly from central Nepal and northeastern India, but it is uncertain whether any of the records outside the Western Ghats refer to this species.

In the Western Ghats M. keralensis is a widespread species found in wet evergreen forests, moist deciduous forests, and marshlands. It has also been recorded from modified habitats including agricultural land and villages. It breeds in temporary ponds.
