= Angkor Centre for Conservation of Biodiversity =

Cambodian non-governmental organization

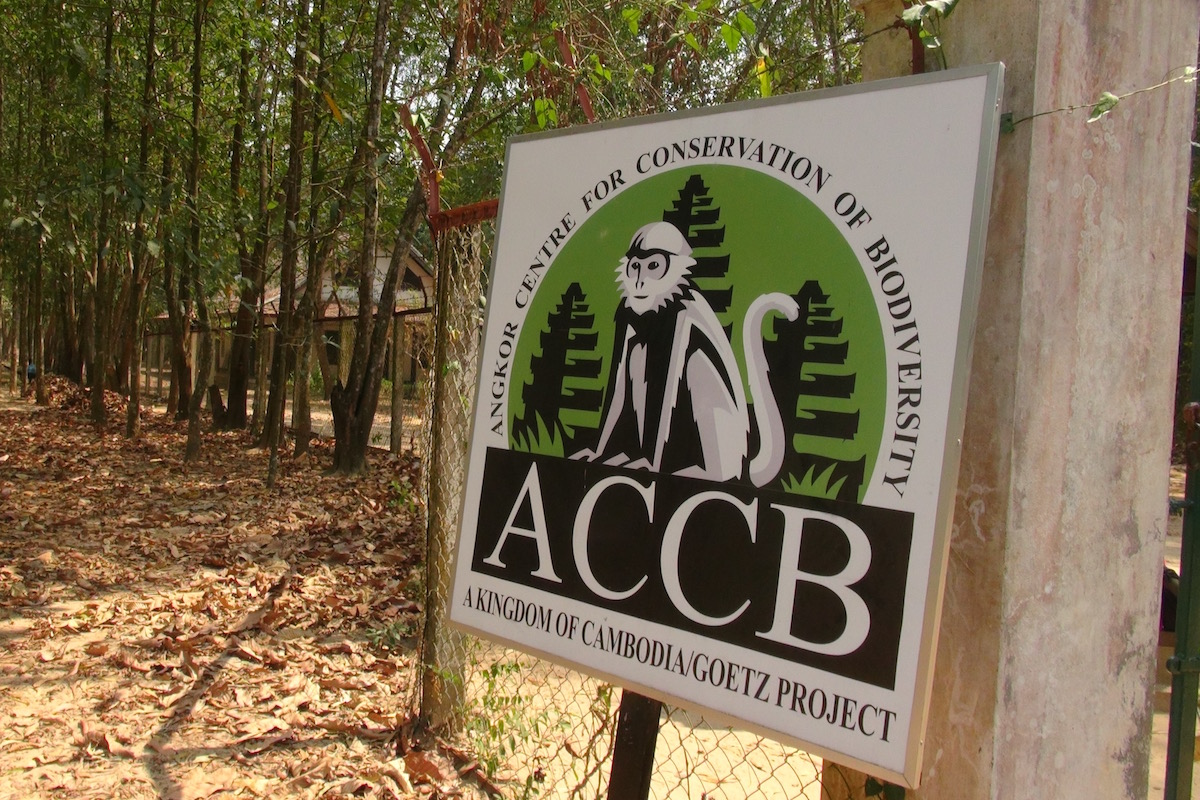

The Angkor Centre for Conservation of Biodiversity (ACCB) is a non-governmental organization in Cambodia. ACCB is "one of the first nature conservation and endangered wildlife rescue and breeding centre" in the country. It works towards the conservation of wildlife and biodiversity in Cambodia. Established in 2003 by the German organizations of Allwetterzoo Münster and the Zoological Society for the Conservation of Species and Populations, ACCB's goals include the rehabilitation of confiscated wildlife, breeding of selected species, environmental education, local community involvement, research, and in-situ conservation. Dr. Stephan Goetz from Munich has provided major financial support via Stiftung Artenschutz (“Species Conservation Foundation”), a consortium of zoos and nature conservation organizations. The ACCB is a project (No. 04010) of the World Association of Zoos and Aquariums.

== Geography ==
Situated on 25 hectares within the Phnom Kulen National Park, ACCB is located in a remote, rural and isolated area of Siem Reap Province near the Angkor Wat temples. It sits at the base of Kbal Spean mountain, 40 kilometres (25 mi) north of Siem Reap. The climate is hot and humid. Various wild animals live in the adjacent forest, including Burmese hares, Malayan porcupines, northern pig-tailed macaques, small Indian mongoose and numerous birds.

== History ==
Between 2001 and 2002, Kai-Olaf Krüger, project manager, and Isabell Stich, veterinarian, arrived in Cambodia from Germany to locate a site for the centre. The use of the site was granted in May 2002 by the Ministry of Agriculture, Forestry and Fisheries. Goetz granted the main financial support, allowing construction to begin in April 2003. The education centre was built in 2004. Enclosures for mammals, birds and turtles, a quarantine facility, veterinary surgery area, residential housing, offices and storage areas were also constructed.

== Animals ==
The ACCB has rescued, rehabilitated and released many important species of Cambodian wildlife, including rare mammals such as Asian palm civets, Bengal slow lorises, Germain's langurs, leopard cats, pileated gibbons and Sunda pangolins. A great variety of birds have been rescued, several of which are water birds like Asian openbills, black-crowned night herons, cattle egrets, greater adjutants, lesser adjutants, lesser whistling ducks and little egrets, as well as Brahminy kites, collared scops owls, crested serpent eagles, green peafowl and red-breasted parakeets. Additionally, the ACCB houses multiple species of reptiles, including Asian water monitors, Burmese pythons, elongated tortoises, Mekong snail-eating turtles, reticulated pythons Tonlé Sap water snakes and yellow-headed temple turtles.

== Activities ==
ACCB's activities are centered around the rescue, rehabilitation and release of native Cambodian wildlife. This is accomplished in a variety of ways, such as the conservation breeding of certain globally threatened species, environmental education and awareness that raises capacity building for conservation, as well as in-situ conservation and research. The organization nurses trafficked animals back to health. It also provides shelter to approximately 100 native animals that appear on the endangered species list. An example of ACCB's activities, a joint initiative with Fauna and Flora International, was the 2010 assessment of the collection and trade of amphibians in Cambodia.

Community events are held in Kun Riem village. The site runs daily tours for a small donation.
