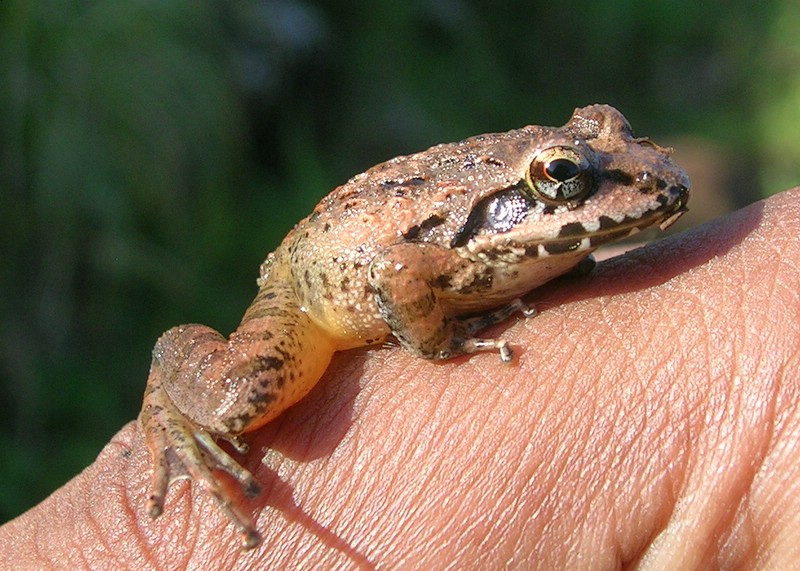
- Adult Indirana semipalmata

Scientific classification
- Kingdom: Animalia
- Phylum: Chordata
- Class: Amphibia
- Order: Anura
- Family: Ranixalidae
- Genus: Indirana; Laurent, 1986

Type species
- Polypedates beddomii Günther, 1876

Diversity
- 14 species (see text)

= Indirana =

Genus of amphibians

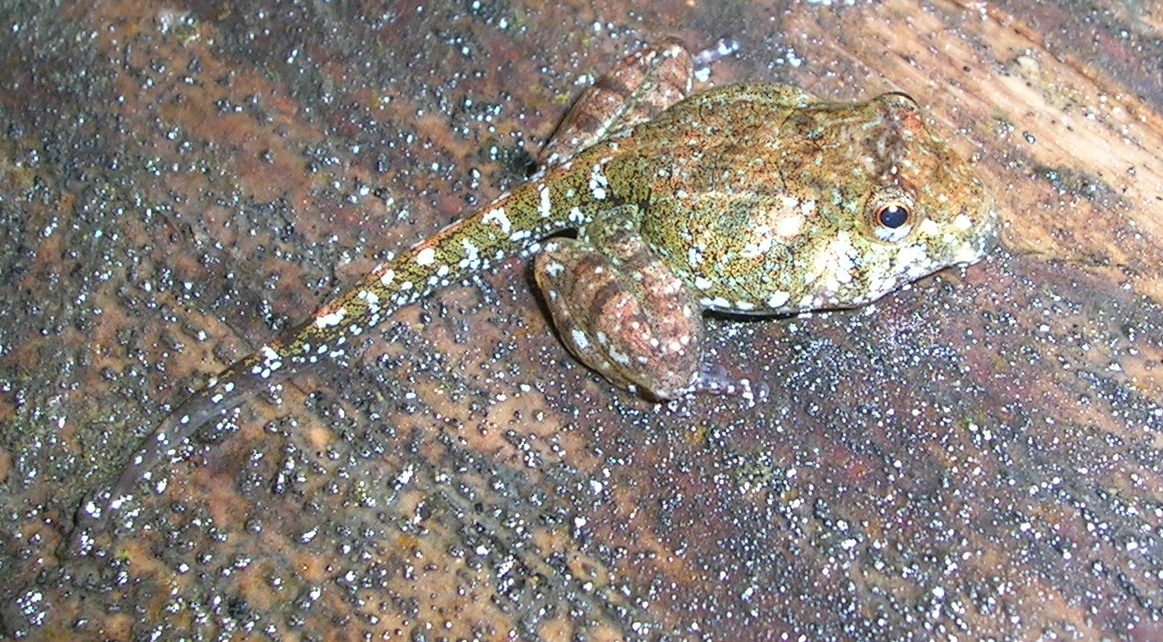
Tadpole of I. cf semipalmata

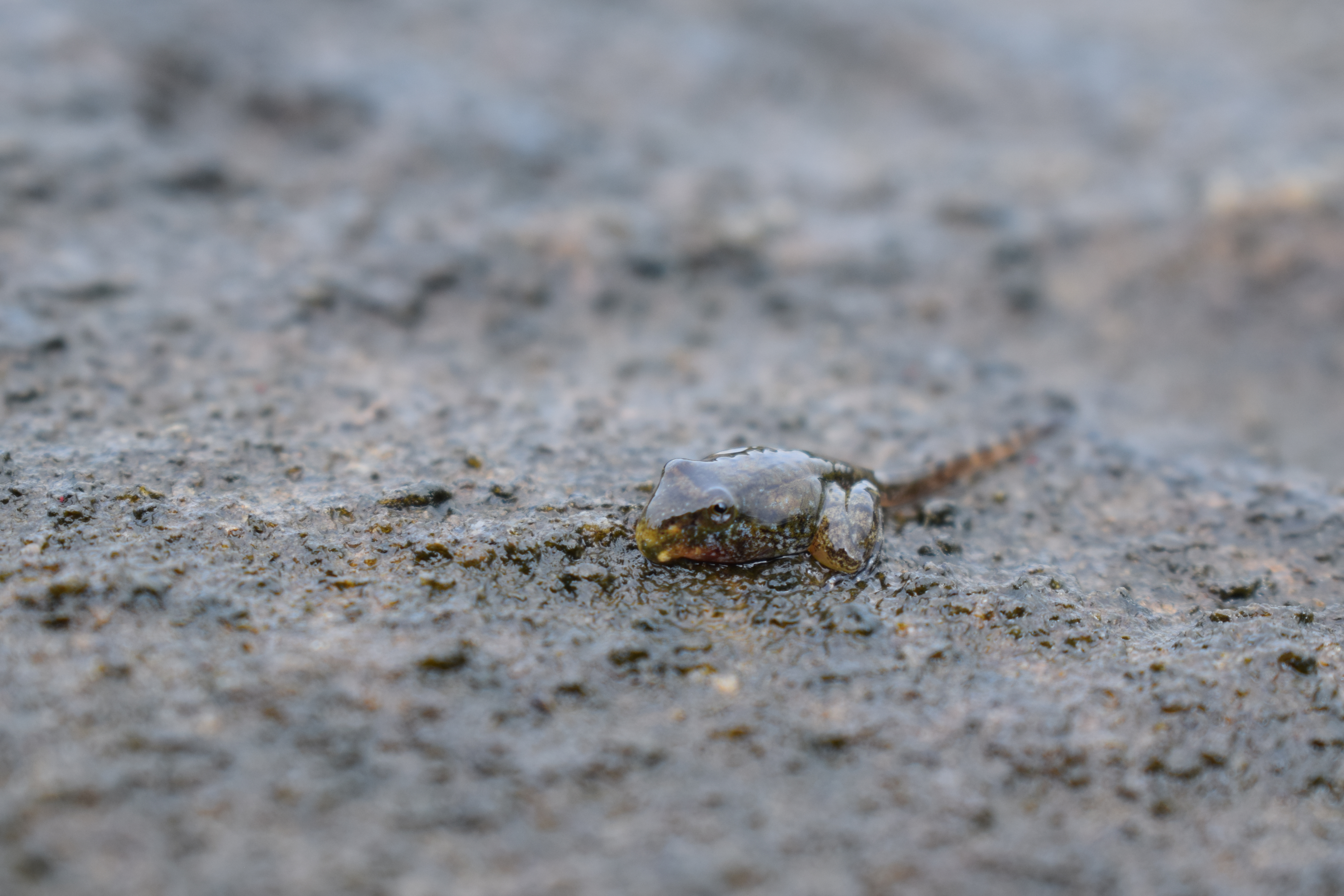

Indirana is a genus of frogs in the family Ranixalidae. These frogs are endemic to the Western Ghats of India. They are sometimes known under the common name Indian frogs, whereas members of their parent family are named "leaping frogs".

Indirana represent an ancient radiation of frogs that diverged from all other frogs almost 50 million years ago. This has credited Indirana gundia as a status of one of the "Top 100 Evolutionarily Distinct and Globally Endangered Amphibians".

== Description ==
Indirana species are small and slender-bodied frogs. They are typically found in leaf litter or near streams. The tadpoles have hind limbs and finless tails, and are able to leap away to escape threats.

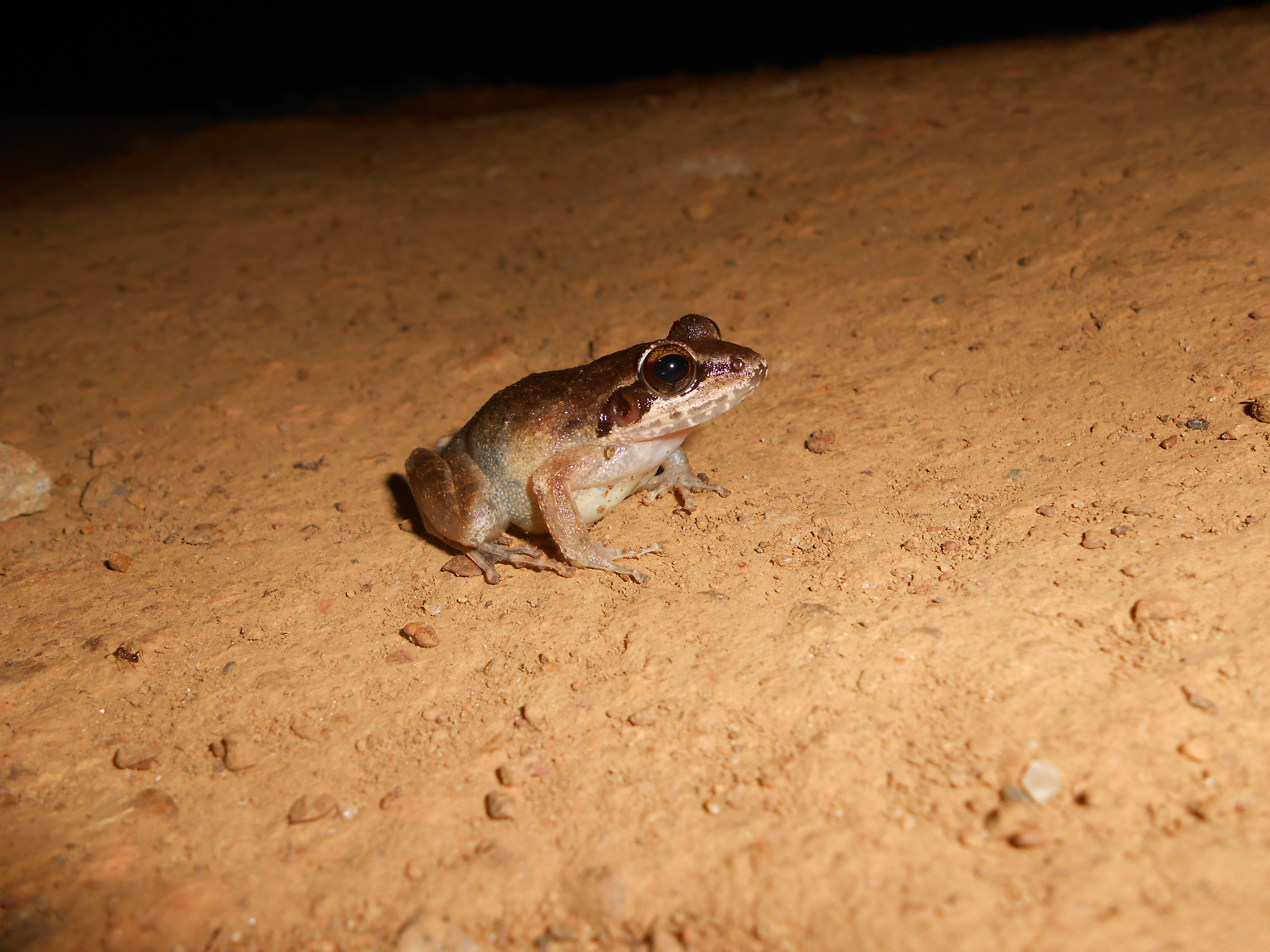
A frog from the genus Indirana

== Taxonomy ==
Traditional classifications place the genus within the subfamily Ranixalinae of the family Ranidae, along with the genera Nannophrys and Nyctibatrachus. The Ranixalinae have also been placed under the family Nyctibatrachidae. Darrel R. Frost et al. (2006) placed them within the family Petropedetidae.

== Species ==
New species are still being discovered: Indirana salelkari was discovered in the Netravali Wildlife Sanctuary in the Indian state of Goa and described in late July 2015. The following species are recognised in the genus Indirana:

- Indirana beddomii (Günther, 1876)
- Indirana bhadrai Garg and Biju, 2016
- Indirana brachytarsus (Günther, 1876)
- Indirana chiravasi Padhye, Modak, and Dahanukar, 2014
- Indirana duboisi Dahanukar, Modak, Krutha, Nameer, Padhye, and Molur, 2016
- Indirana gundia (Dubois, 1986)
- Indirana leithii (Boulenger, 1888)
- Indirana longicrus (Rao, 1937)
- Indirana paramakri Garg and Biju, 2016
- Indirana salelkari Modak, Dahanukar, and Padhye, 2015
- Indirana sarojamma Dahanukar, Modak, Krutha, Nameer, Padhye, and Molur, 2016
- Indirana semipalmata (Boulenger, 1882)
- Indirana tysoni Dahanukar, Modak, Krutha, Nameer, Padhye, and Molur, 2016
- Indirana yadera Dahanukar, Modak, Krutha, Nameer, Padhye, and Molur, 2016
