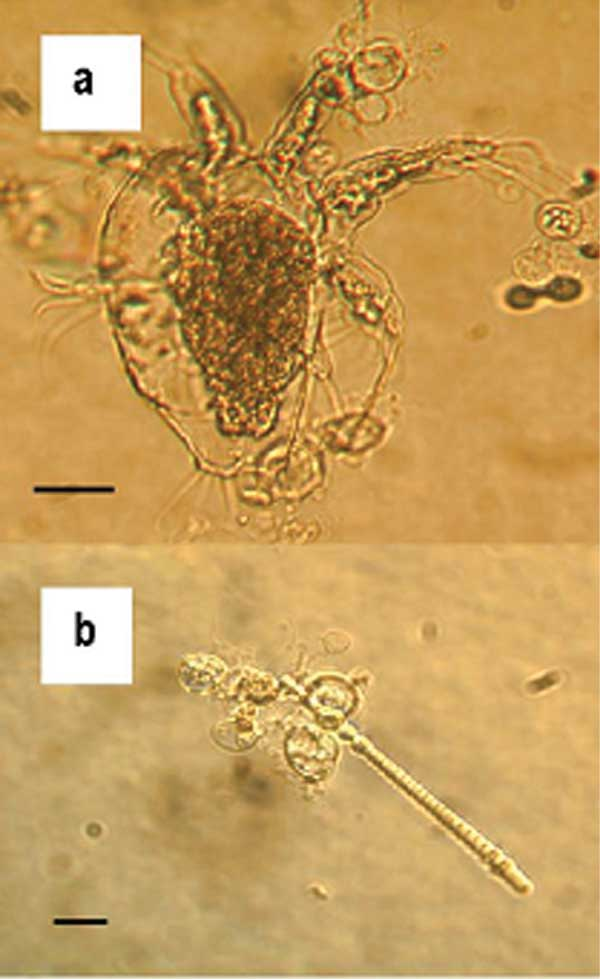
- Zoosporangia of B. dendrobatidis growing on a freshwater arthropod (a) and algae (b); scale bars = 30 μm

Scientific classification
- Kingdom: Fungi
- Division: Chytridiomycota
- Class: Chytridiomycetes
- Order: Rhizophydiales
- Family: Batrachochytriaceae
- Genus: Batrachochytrium
- Species: B. dendrobatidis

Binomial name
- Batrachochytrium dendrobatidis Longcore, Pessier & D.K. Nichols (1999)

= Batrachochytrium dendrobatidis =

Species of fungus

Batrachochytrium dendrobatidis, also known as Bd or the amphibian chytrid fungus, is a fungus that causes the disease chytridiomycosis in amphibians.

Since its discovery in 1998 by Lee Berger and species description in 1999 by Joyce E. Longcore, the disease devastated amphibian populations around the world, in a global decline towards multiple extinctions, part of the Holocene extinction. A recently described second species, B. salamandrivorans, also causes chytridiomycosis and death in salamanders.

The fungal pathogens that cause the disease chytridiomycosis are known to damage the skin of frogs, toads, and other amphibians, disrupting their balance of water and salt and eventually causing heart failure, Nature reports.

Some amphibian species appear to have an innate capacity to withstand chytridiomycosis infection due to symbiosis with Janthinobacterium lividum. Even within species that generally succumb, some populations survive, possibly demonstrating that these traits or alleles of species are being subjected to evolutionary selection.

== Etymology ==
The generic name is derived from the Greek words batrachos (frog) and chytra (earthen pot), while the specific epithet is derived from the genus of frogs from which the original confirmation of pathogenicity was made (Dendrobates), dendrobatidis is from the Greek dendron, "tree" and bates, "one who climbs", referring to a genus of poison dart frogs.

== Systematics ==
Batrachochytrium dendrobatidis was until recently considered the single species of the genus Batrachochytrium. The initial classification of the pathogen as a chytrid was based on zoospore ultrastructure. DNA analysis of the SSU-rDNA has corroborated the view, with the closest match to Chytridium confervae. A second species of Batrachochytrium was discovered in 2013: B. salamandrivorans, which mainly affects salamanders and also causes chytridiomycosis. B. salamandrivorans differs from B. dendrobatidis primarily in the formation of germ tubes in vitro, the formation of colonial thalli with multiple sporangia in vivo, and a lower thermal preference.

== Morphology ==
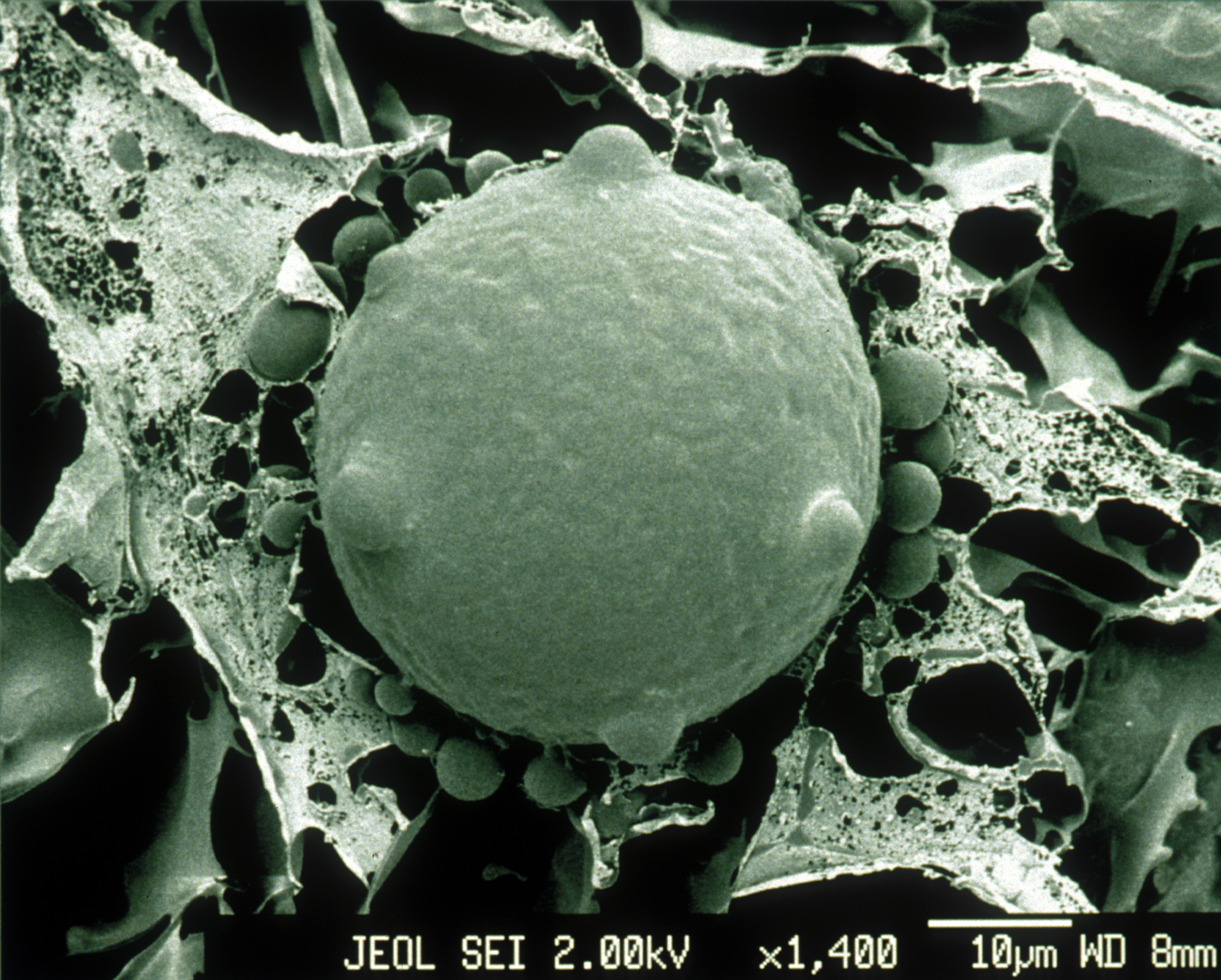
Scanning electron micrograph of a frozen intact zoospore and sporangia of the chytrid fungus (Batrachochytrium dendrobatidis), CSIRO

B. dendrobatidis infects the keratinized skin of amphibians. The fungus in the epidermis has a thallus bearing a network of rhizoids and smooth-walled, roughly spherical, inoperculate (without an operculum) sporangia. Each sporangium produces a single tube to discharge spores.

=== Zoospore structure ===
Zoospores of B. dendrobatidis, which are typically 3–5 μm in size, have an elongate–ovoid body with a single, posterior flagellum (19-20 μm long), and possess a core area of ribosomes often with membrane-bound spheres of ribosomes within the main ribosomal mass. A small spur has been observed, located at the posterior of the cell body, adjacent to the flagellum, but this may be an artifact in the formalin-fixed specimens. The core area of ribosomes is surrounded by a single cisterna of endoplasmic reticulum, two to three mitochondria, and an extensive microbody–lipid globule complex. The microbodies closely appose and almost surround four to six lipid globules (three anterior and one to three laterally), some of which appear bound by a cisterna. Some zoospores appear to contain more lipid globules (this may have been a result of a plane-of-sectioning effect, because the globules were often lobed in the zoospores examined). A rumposome has not been observed.

=== Flagellum structure ===
A nonfunctioning centriole lies adjacent to the kinetosome. Nine interconnected props attach the kinetosome to the plasmalemma, and a terminal plate is present in the transitional zone. An inner ring-like structure attached to the tubules of the flagellar doublets within the transitional zone has been observed in transverse section. No roots associated with the kinetosome have been observed. In many zoospores, the nucleus lies partially within the aggregation of ribosomes and was invariably situated laterally. Small vacuoles and a Golgi body with stacked cisternae occurred within the cytoplasm outside the ribosomal area. Mitochondria, which often contain a small number of ribosomes, are densely staining with discoidal cristae.

== Life cycle ==
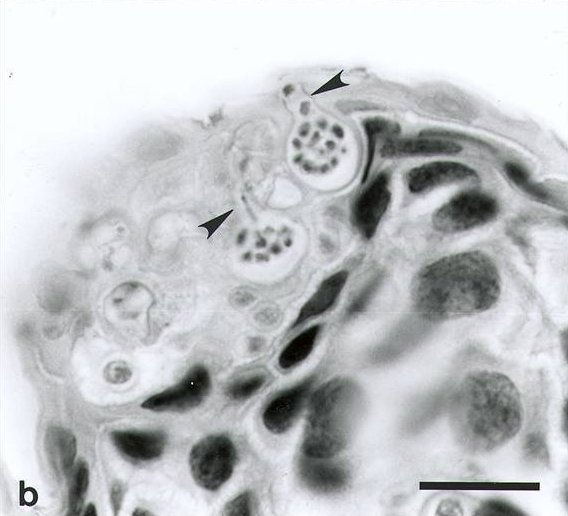
B. dendrobatidis sporangia in the skin of an Atelopus varius. The arrows indicate discharge tubes through which zoospores exit the host cell. Scale bar = 35 μm.

B. dendrobatidis has two primary life stages: a sessile, reproductive zoosporangium and a motile, uniflagellated zoospore released from the zoosporangium. The zoospores are known to be active only for a short period of time, and can travel short distances of one to two centimeters. However, the zoospores are capable of chemotaxis, and can move towards a variety of molecules that are present on the amphibian surface, such as sugars, proteins and amino acids. B. dendrobatidis also contains a variety of proteolytic enzymes and esterases that help it digest amphibian cells and use amphibian skin as a nutrient source. Once the zoospore reaches its host, it forms a cyst underneath the surface of the skin, and initiates the reproductive portion of its life cycle. The encysted zoospores develop into zoosporangia, which may produce more zoospores that can reinfect the host, or be released into the surrounding aquatic environment. The amphibians infected with these zoospores are shown to die from cardiac arrest.

Besides amphibians B. dendrobatidis also infects crayfish (Procambarus alleni, P. clarkii, Orconectes virilis, and O. immunis) but not mosquitofish (Gambusia holbrooki).

== Physiology ==
B. dendrobatidis can grow within a wide temperature range (4-25 °C), with optimal temperatures being between 17 °C and 25 °C. The wide temperature range for growth, including the ability to survive at 4 °C gives the fungus the ability to overwinter in its hosts, even where temperatures in the aquatic environments are low. The species does not grow well above temperatures of 25 °C, and growth is halted above 28 °C. Infected red-eyed treefrogs (Litoria chloris) recovered from their infections when incubated at a temperature of 37 °C.

=== Varying forms ===
B. dendrobatidis has occasionally been found in forms distinct from its traditional zoospore and sporangia stages. For example, before the 2003 European heat wave that decimated populations of the water frog Rana lessonae through chytridiomycosis, the fungus existed on the amphibians as spherical, unicellular organisms, confined to minute patches (80-120 μm across). These organisms, unknown at the time, were subsequently identified as B. dendrobatidis. Characteristics of the organisms were suggestive of encysted zoospores; they may have embodied a resting spore, a saprobe, or a parasitic form of the fungus that is non-pathogenic.

=== Habitat and relationship to amphibians ===
The fungus grows on amphibian skin and produces aquatic zoospores. It is widespread and ranges from lowland forests to cold mountain tops. It is sometimes a non-lethal parasite and possibly a saprophyte. The fungus is associated with host mortality in highlands or during winter, and becomes more pathogenic at lower temperatures.

== Geographic distribution ==
It has been suggested that B. dendrobatidis originated in Africa or Asia and subsequently spread to other parts of the world by trade in African clawed frogs (Xenopus laevis). In this study, 697 archived specimens of three species of Xenopus, previously collected from 1879 to 1999 in southern Africa, were examined. The earliest case of chytridiomycosis was found in a X. laevis specimen from 1938. The study also suggests that chytridiomycosis had been a stable infection in southern Africa from 23 years prior to finding any infected outside of Africa. There is more recent information that the species originated on the Korean peninsula and was spread by the trade in frogs.

American bullfrogs (Lithobates catesbeianus), also widely distributed, are also thought to be carriers of the disease due to their inherent low susceptibility to B. dendrobatidis infection. The bullfrog often escapes captivity and can establish feral populations where it may introduce the disease to new areas. It has also been shown that B. dendrobatidis can survive and grow in moist soil and on bird feathers, suggesting that B. dendrobatidis may also be spread in the environment by birds and transportation of soils. Infections have been linked to mass mortalities of amphibians in North America, South America, Central America, Europe and Australia. B. dendrobatidis has been implicated in the extinction of the sharp-snouted day frog (Taudactylus acutirostris) in Australia.

A wide variety of amphibian hosts have been identified as being susceptible to infection by B. dendrobatidis, including wood frogs (Lithobates sylvatica), the mountain yellow-legged frog (Lithobates muscosa), the southern two-lined salamander (Eurycea cirrigera), San Marcos Salamander (Eurycea nana), Texas Salamander (Eurycea neotenes), Blanco River Springs Salamander (Eurycea pterophila), Barton Springs Salamander (Eurycea sosorum), Jollyville Plateau Salamander (Eurycea tonkawae), Ambystoma jeffersonianum, the western chorus frog (Pseudacris triseriata), the southern cricket frog (Acris gryllus), the eastern spadefoot toad (Scaphiopus holbrooki), the southern leopard frog (Lithobates sphenocephala), the Rio Grande Leopard frog (Lithobates berlandieri), the Sardinian newt (Euproctus platycephalus), and endemic frog species, the Beysehir frog in Turkey (Pelophylax caralitanus).

=== Southeast Asia ===
While most studies concerning B. dendrobatidis have been performed in various locations across the world, the presence of the fungus in Southeast Asia remains a relatively recent development. The exact process through which the fungus was introduced to Asia is not known, however, as mentioned above, it has been suggested transportation of asymptomatic carrier species (e.g. Lithobates catesbeianus, the American Bullfrog) may be a key component in the dissemination of the fungus, at least in China. Initial studies demonstrated the presence of the fungus on island states/countries such as Hong Kong, Indonesia, Taiwan, and Japan. Soon thereafter, mainland Asian countries such as Thailand, South Korea, and China reported incidents of B. dendrobatidis among their amphibian populations. Much effort has been put into classifying herpetofauna in countries like Cambodia, Vietnam, and Laos where new species of frogs, toads, and other amphibians and reptiles are being discovered on a frequent basis. Scientists simultaneously are swabbing herpetofauna in order to determine if these newly discovered animals possess traces of the fungus.

In Cambodia, a study showed B. dendrobatidis to be prevalent throughout the country in areas near Phnom Penh (in a village <5 km), Sihanoukville (frogs collected from the local market), Kratie (frogs collected from streets around the town), and Siem Reap (frogs collected from a national preserve: Angkor Centre for Conservation of Biodiversity). Another study in Cambodia questioned the potential anthropological impact in the dissemination of B. dendrobatidis on local amphibian populations in three different areas in relation to human interaction: low (an isolated forest atop a mountain people rarely visit), medium (a forest road ~15 km from a village that is used at least once a week), and high (a small village where humans interact with their environment on a daily basis). Using quantitative PCR, evidence of B. dendrobatidis was found in all three sites with the highest percentage of amphibians positive for the fungus from the forest road (medium impact; 50%), followed by the mountain forest (low impact; 44%) and village (high impact; 36%). Human influence most likely explains detection of the fungus in the medium and high areas, however it does not provide an adequate explanation why even isolated amphibians were positive for B. dendrobatidis. This may go unanswered until more research is performed on transmission of the fungus across landscapes. However, recent evidence suggests mosquitoes may be a possible vector which may help spread B. dendrobatidis. Another study in French Guiana reports widespread infection, with 8 of 11 sites sampled being positive for B. dendrobatidis infection for at least one species. This study suggests that Bd (Batrachochytrium dendrobatidis) is more widespread than previously thought.

== Effect on amphibians ==
Worldwide amphibian populations have been on a steady decline due to an increase in the disease chytridiomycosis, caused by the Bd fungus. Bd can be introduced to an amphibian primarily through water exposure, colonizing the digits and ventral surfaces of the animal's body most heavily and spreading throughout the body as the animal matures. Potential effects of this pathogen are hyperkeratosis, epidermal hyperplasia, ulcers, and most prominently the change in osmotic regulation often leading to cardiac arrest. The death toll on amphibians is dependent on a variety of factors but most crucially on the intensity of infection. Certain frogs adopt skin sloughing as a defense mechanism for B. dendrobatidis; however, this is not always effective, as mortality fluctuates between species. For example, the Fletcher frog, despite practising skin sloughing, suffers from a particularly high mortality rate when infected with the disease compared to similar species like Lim. peronii and Lim. tasmaniensis. Some amphibian species have been found to adapt to infection after an initial die-off with survival rates of infected and non-infected individuals being equal.

According to a study by the Australian National University, the Bd fungus has caused the decline of 501 amphibian species—about 6.5 percent of the world's known total. Of these, 90 species have been entirely wiped out and another 124 species have declined by more than 90 percent, and the odds of the affected species recovering to a healthy population are doubtful. However, these conclusions were criticized by later studies, which proposed that Bd was not the primary driver of amphibian declines as suggested by the previous study.

One amphibian particular affected by Bd is Lithobates clamitans. Bd kills this frog by interfering with external water exchange, causing an imbalance in ion exchange that leads to heart failure.

=== Immunity ===
Some amphibian species are immune to Bd or possess biological protections against the fungus. One such species is the alpine salamander (Salamandra atra), which includes several subspecies that share a common trait: toxicity. A 2012 study demonstrated that none of the alpine salamanders in the area were infected with Bd, despite the fungus' prevalence. Alpine salamanders produce alkaloid compounds or toxic peptides that may protect them against microbial infections.

== See also ==
- Pathogenic fungi
- Decline in amphibian populations
- Ranavirus
