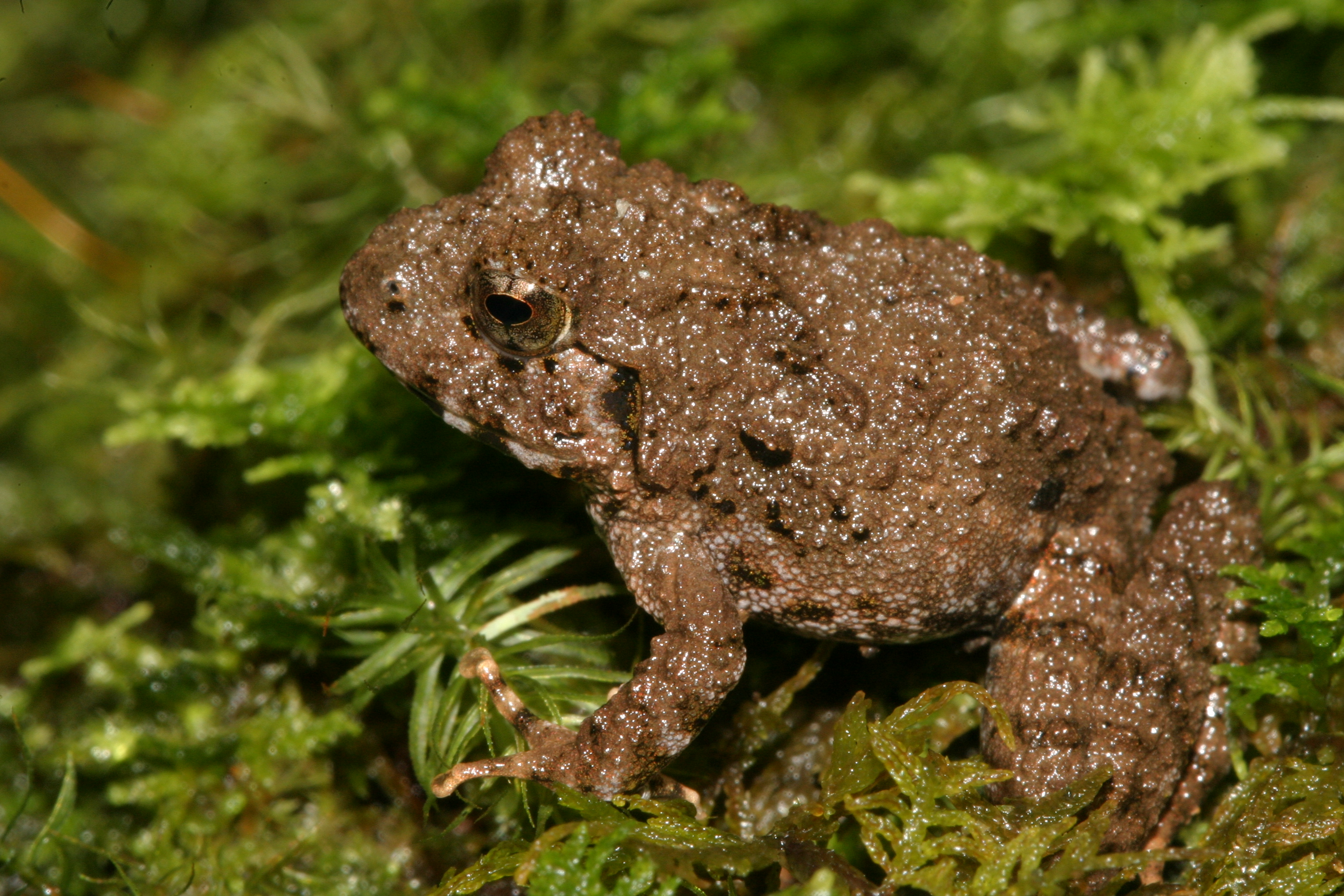
- Walkerana phrynoderma

Scientific classification
- Kingdom: Animalia
- Phylum: Chordata
- Class: Amphibia
- Order: Anura
- Superfamily: Ranoidea
- Family: Ranixalidae; Dubois, 1987

Genera
- Indirana Laurent, 1986; Walkerana Dahanukar et al., 2016

= Ranixalidae =

Family of amphibians

Ranixalidae is a family of frogs commonly known as the leaping frogs or Indian frogs. They are endemic to central and southern India, specifically in the Western Ghat mountain range. This mountain range encompasses the Indian states of Gujarat, Maharashtra, Goa, Karnataka, Kerala, and Tamil Nadu. Ranixalidae can be found in Maharashtra, Goa, Karnataka, and Kerala. There is a large concentration of them in Goa and Maharashtra, however there are still considerable amounts of species within the southern Indian states of Karnataka and Kerala, where there are other frogs within the Indirana genus.

Scientists say the two groups of frogs in Ranixalidae, Indirana and Walkerana, split around 58.4 million years ago.

== Genera ==
There are two genera with a total 18 species:

- Indirana Laurent, 1986 — 14 species
- Walkerana Dahanukar, Modak, Krutha, Nameer, Padhye, and Molur, 2016 — 4 species

The respective species counts in the AmphibiaWeb are 15 (because Indirana tenuilingua, a nomen inquirendum, is listed) and three (Walkerana muduga Dinesh et al., 2020 not (yet) listed).
