= Ranni Forest Division =

Forest division in Kerala, India

Ranni Forest Division Malayalam: റാന്നി വനം ഡിവിഷൻ
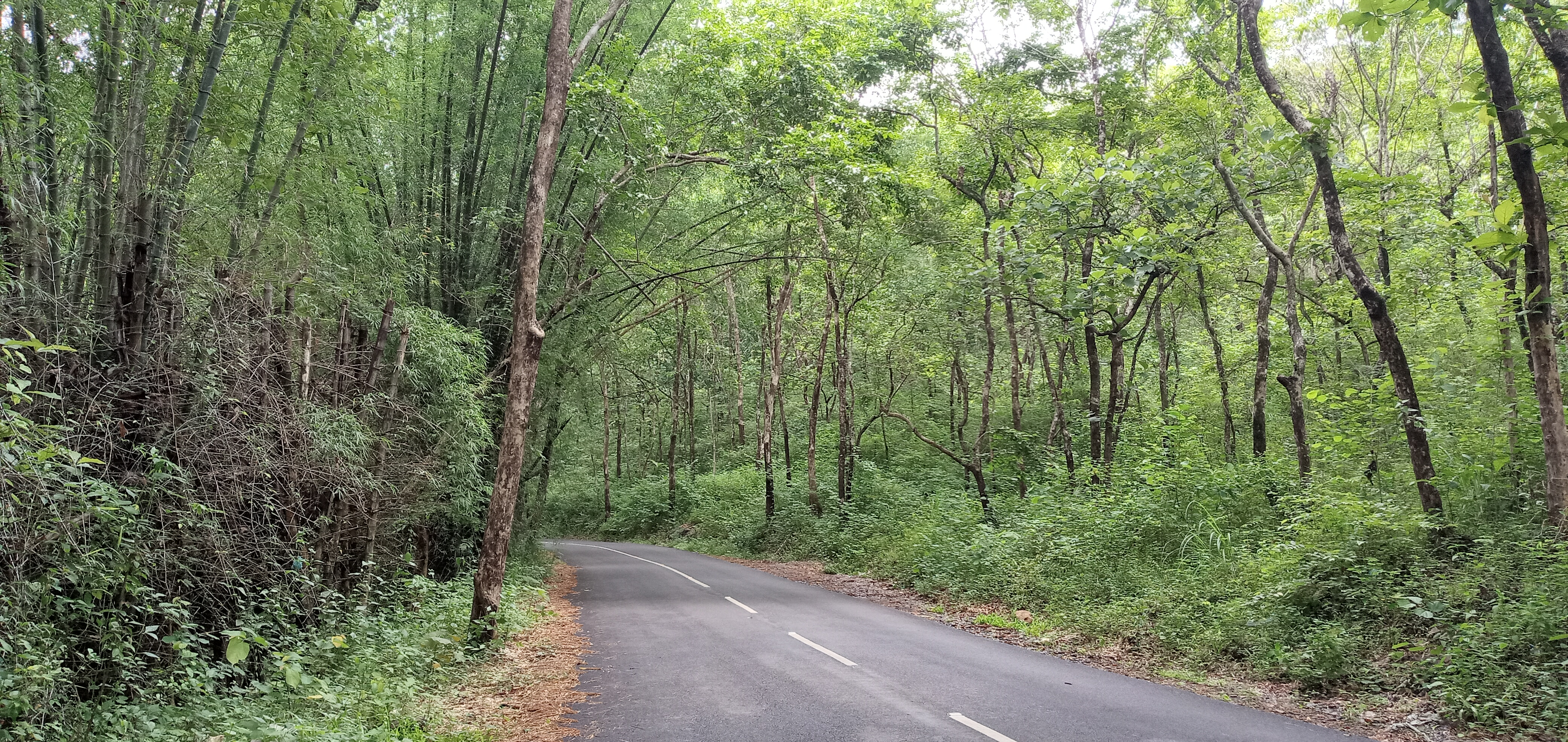
- Karikulam forest area in Ranni range under Ranni division

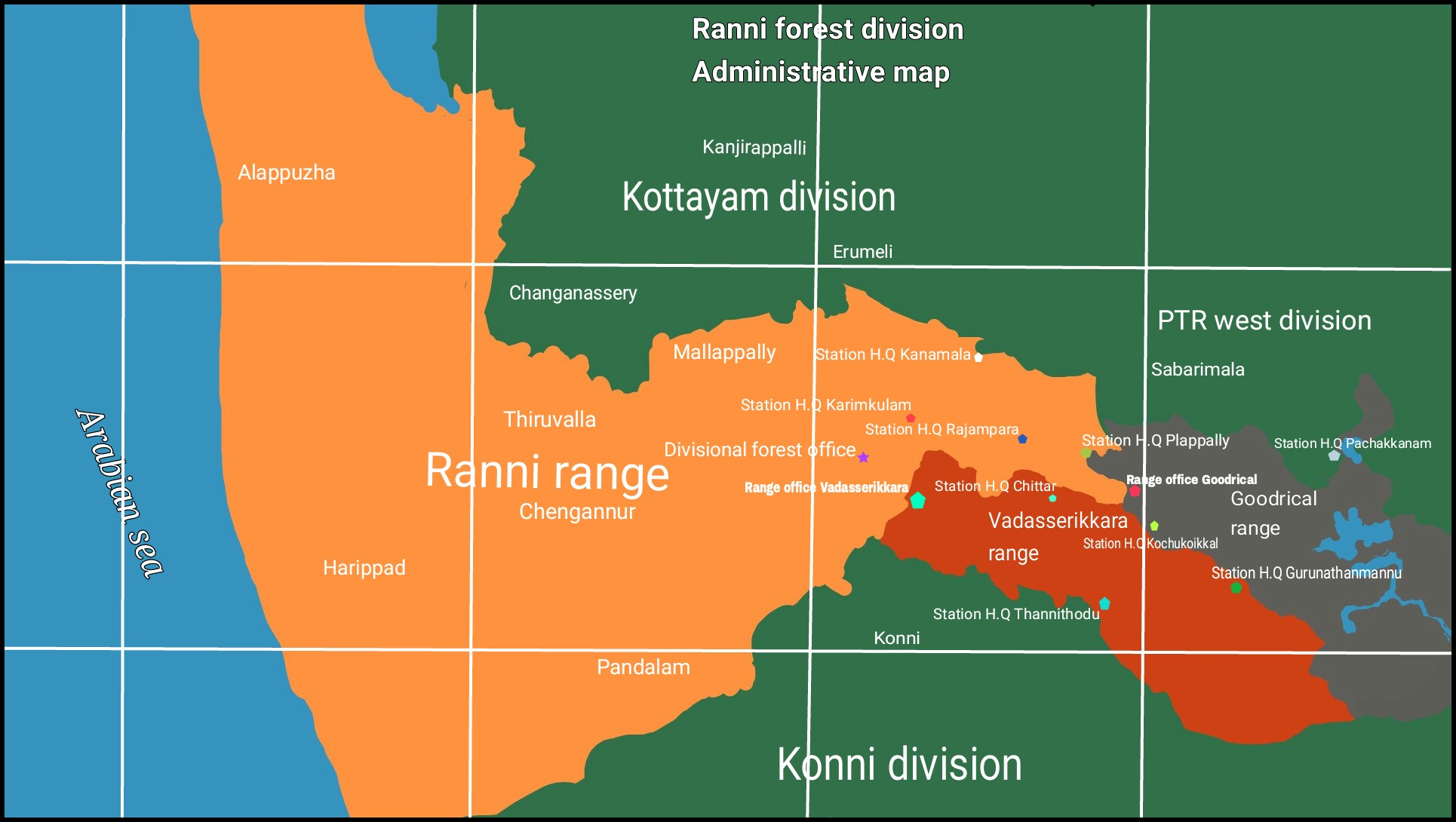
- Administrative map of Ranni Forest Division

Geography
- Location: Kerala, India
- Coordinates: 9°22′29″N 76°46′43″E
- Area: 1,059 km^{2} (409 sq mi)

Administration
- Established: 7 July 1958
- Authority: Kerala Forest and Wildlife Department
- Website: forest.kerala.gov.in

The Ranni Forest Division in Kerala, India, was constituted on 7 July 1958, comprising the Ranni, Vadasserikkara and Goodrical ranges, with its headquarters at Ranni. It covers the parts of Konni reserve forest and the reserves of Ranni, Goodrical, Rajampara, Karimkulam, Kumaramperoor, Valiyakavu, and Schettakkal. It covers an area of 1,059 square kilometres (409 sq mi). It is the largest forest division by area in Kerala

== Types of forests and composition ==
Reserve forests covering 1,057 square kilometres (408 sq mi) and vested forests covering 1.5 square kilometres (0.6 sq mi) are the major types of forests in this division. The Ranni Forest Division, with its natural beauty and richness in flora and fauna, is a storehouse of many varieties of plants and animals. The forests in the Ranni range can be classified into the following categories.

- West coast tropical evergreen forests
- West coast semi-evergreen forests
- Southern moist mixed deciduous forests
- Southern sub tropical wet hill forests
- Southern montane wet temperate forests
- Reed breakes
- Grass lands
- Manmade forests

== Divisions of Ranni forest ==
1. Goodrical (61.7%)
2. Vadasserikkara (25.4%)
3. Ranni (12.9%)

=== Goodrical range ===
The Goodrical forest range is situated in the eastern side of Pathanamthitta district, with an area of 654 square kilometres (253 sq mi). Comparatively, human interference is less in these forests than in others in India. But at times of the Sabarimala pilgrimage, these forests ranges are crowded with devotees. Evergreen and semi-evergreen types of forests are here. There are three forest stations under this range:

- Plappally
- Kochukoikkal
- Pachakkanam

=== Vadasserikkara range ===
The Vadasserikkara range lies to the eastern part of Ranni, with its headquarters at Vadasserikkara. This range covers an area of almost 268 square kilometres (103 sq mi) of the Ranni Forest Division. Kakkattar and Kallar, tributaries of the Pamba River, flow through this range. Small-scale agriculture is done in the populated regions of the Vadasserikkara range, especially on the gentle slopes. The natural forests of this range are classified into west coast tropical evergreen forests, west coast semi-evergreen forests, southern moist mixed deciduous forests, and grasslands. There are three forest stations under Vadasserikkara:

- Chittar
- Gurunathanmannu
- Thannithodu

=== Ranni range ===
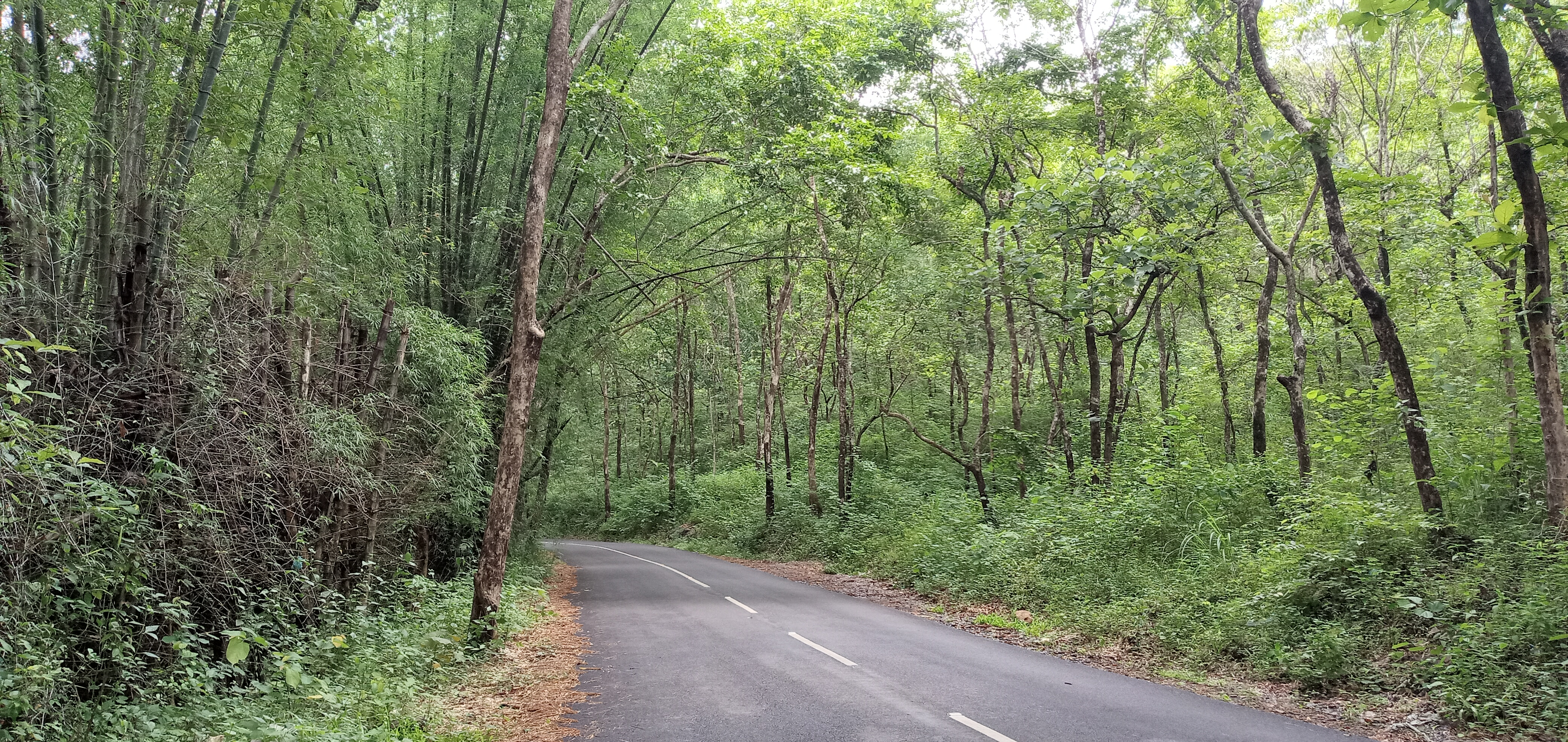
Karikulam forest

The Ranni range covers an area of 136.2 square kilometres (53 sq mi), and its headquarters is at Ranni. Evergreen, semi-evergreen, and deciduous types of forests can be seen here. The three forest stations under this range are:

- Karikulam
- Kanamala
- Rajampara

== Index of flora and fauna ==
=== Flora ===
Many unique plants and herbs can be seen in these forest ranges. Medical plants such as Shatavari (Asparagus racemosus), Solanum anguivi, Desmodium gangeticum, Cissus quadrangularis, Pseudarthria viscida, Strobilanthes ciliatus, and Dysoxylum malabaricum (Vella akil) grow in the deeper parts of the forest. The eco-system of the forests here is suitable for the growth of these plants. A complete list of plants seen in Ranni division is given below.

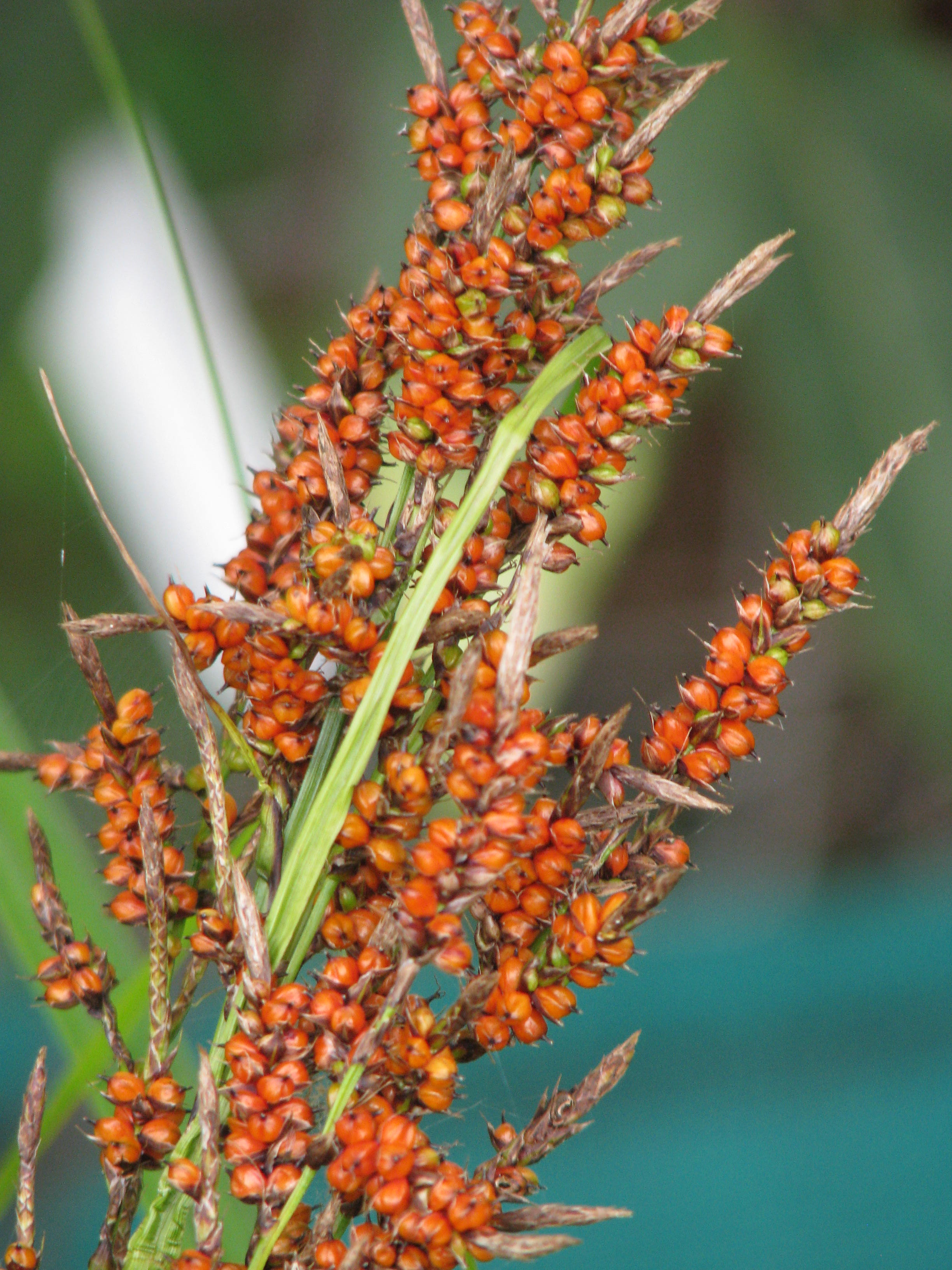
Crimson seeded sedge (Carex baccans), known for its bright, showy, seed heads, which grow from 6–12 inches long and 3 inches wide

List of flora in Ranni division
Column A	Column B
Abutilon persicum	Angiopteris evecta
Canthium dicoccum	Caesalpinia bonduc
Acacia intsia	Crotalaria ferruginea
Carex baccans	Antidesma menasu
Acalypha malabarica	Caesalpinia mimosoides
Argyreia hirsuta	Crotalaria heyneana
Bauhinia phoenicea	Aphanamixis polystachya
Ageratum conyzoides	Calamus hookerianus
Begonia malabarica	Crotalaria pallida
Carissa carandas	Crotalaria walkeri
Achyranthes aspera	Calanthe masuca
Aristolochia tagala	Galinsoga parviflora
Acrotrema arnottiana	Croton caudatus
Argyreia elliptica	Crotalaria umbellata
Casearia esculenta	Garuga pinnata
Ardisia pauciflora	Croton malabaricus
Ardisia pauciflora	Diploclisia glaucescens
Careya arborea	Gleichenia linearis
Acalypha paniculata	Croton reticulatus
Asparagus racemosus	Diplocyclos palmatus
Cassia hirsuta	Glochidion ellipticum
Actephila excelsa	Cryptolepis buchananii
Asystasia Falwell	Dipterocarpus bourdillonii
Cassia mimosoides	Glycine javanica
Actinodaphne tadulingamii	Cucumis sativus
Atylosia lineata	Dracaena terniflora
Cayratia japonica	Glycosmis mauritiana
Adenia hondala	Cyanotis aristata
Baccaurea courtallensis	Drymaria cordata
Cayratia pedata	Gomphandra tetrandra
Adenostemma lavenia	Cyanotis pilosa
Barleria involucrata	Dumasia villosa
Centrosema pubescens	Gordonia obtusa
Aeginetia pedunculata	Cycas circilanis
Barringtonia acutangula	Ehretia canarensis
Ceropagia candelabrum	Gouania microcarpa
Aeschynanthus perrottetii	Cyclea peltata
Chassalia ophioxyloides	Elaeocarpus munroi
Chloranthus brachystachya	Grewia orbiculata
Agrostistachys borneensis	Cyperus diffusus
Belosynapsis vivipara	Elaeocarpus tuberculatus
Chrysopogon fulvus	Grewia umbellifera
Alstonia scholaris	Cyperus distans
Bentinckia condepanna	Eratostema lineolatum
Cissus quadrangularis	Gynura aurantiaca
Amaranthus viridis	Cyperus iria
Bidens biternata	Eleusine indica
Citrus medica	Gynura nitida
Amomum cannicarpum	Cyrtococcum oxyphyllum
Biophytum sensitivum	Embelia ribes
Clerodendrum viscosum	Habenaria crinifea
Anaphalis lawii	Debregeasia longifolia
Bischofia javanica	Emilia sonchifolia
Clidemia hirta	Hedyotis membranacea
Anaphalis subdecurrens	Dendrobium herbaceum
Blumea lanceolaria	Eragrostis unioloides
Coleus malabaricus	Helicteres isora
Anaphalis travancorica	Dendrobium ovatum
Blumea membranacea	Eranthemum capense
Combretum ovalifolium	Hibiscus furcatus
Anaphyllum wightii	Desmodium laxum
Blumea virens	Ervatamia divaricata
Commelina clavata	Holigarna nigra
Andrographis paniculata	Desmodium triflorum
Boehmeria glomerulifera	Erythrina stricta
Commelina obliqua	Hoya wightii
Andrographis wightiana	Desmodium triquetrum
Bolbitis sp.(Hybrid)	Erythropalum populifolium
Commelina suffruticosa	Humboldtia vahliana
Aneilema montanum	Dianella ensifolia
Breynia retusa	Euonymus indicus
Connarus macrocarpus	Hydnocarpus laurifolia
Aneilema ovalifolium	Dichapetalum gelonioides
Breynia vitis-idaea	Eurya Japonica
Conyza bonariensis	Hydrocotyle javanica
Aneilema scaberrimum	Dicraea stylosa
Bridelia scandens	Dillenia pentagyna
Costus speciosus	Dillenia suffruticosa

=== Fauna ===
==== Fishes and amphibians ====
The natural streams and rivers in these ranges are the repository of varied fish species and amphibians. Almost 51 species of fishes and 43 species of amphibians were reported from the various streams and water bodies in the forest divisions of Ranni. They are the following.

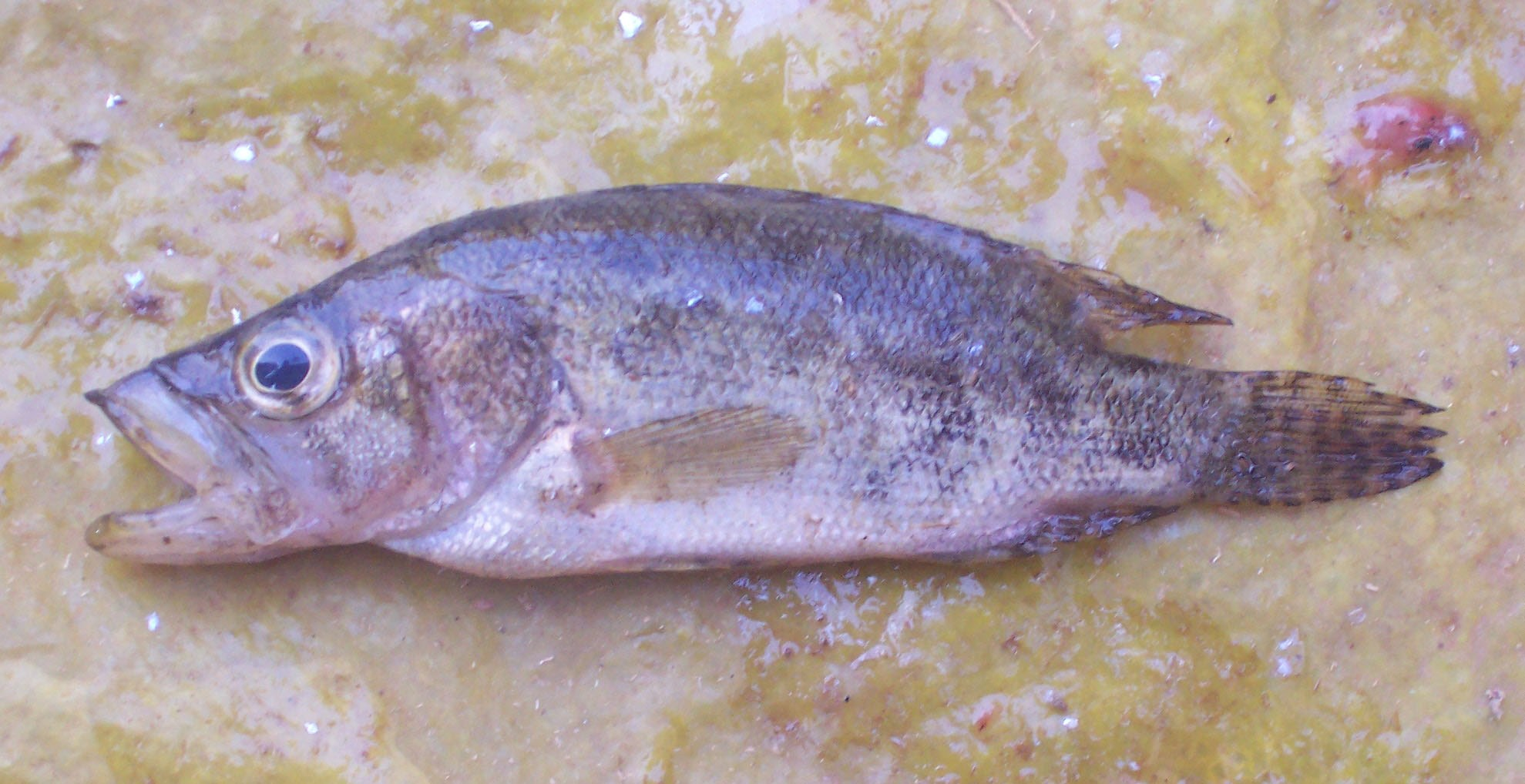
Nandus nandus (Gangetic leaffish), a fresh water Asian leafish species

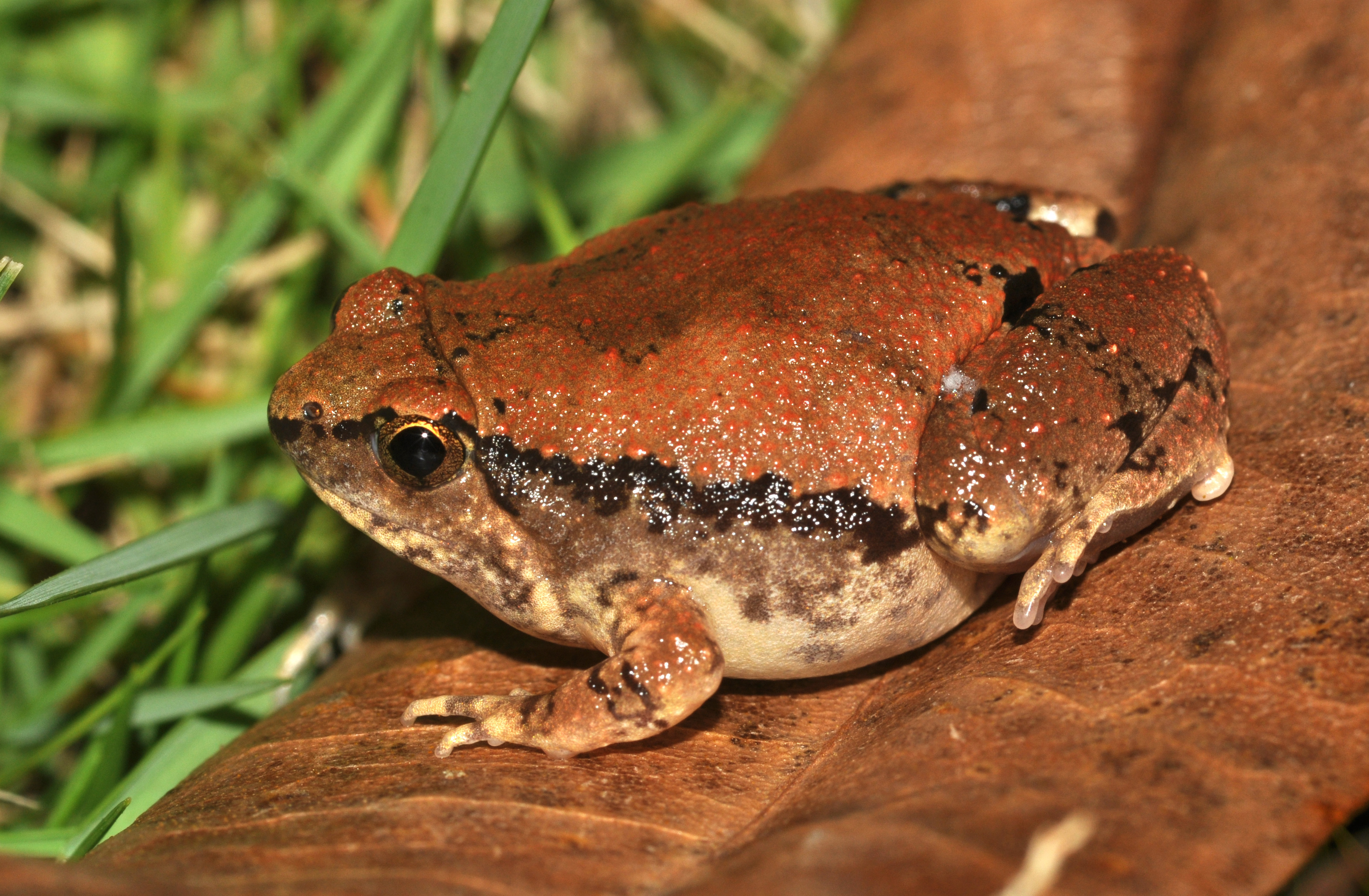
Microhyla rubra lateral, the narrow mouthed species of frog

Fishes	Amphibians
Parambasis thomassi	Ichtyophis tricolor
Hypselobarbus curmuca	Uraeotyphlus narayani
Pseudoambassis ranga	Uraeotyphlus menoni
Hypselobarbus kurali	Uraeotyphlus oommeni
Nandus nandus	Gegeneophis ramaswamii
Labeo rohita	Sphaerotheca breviceps
Pristolepis marginata	Sphaerotheca rolandae
Garra mullya	Euphylyctis cf. mudigere
Etroplus maculatus	Euphlyctis cf. aloysii
Travancoria jonesi	Hoplobatrachus crassus
Etroplus suratensis	Hoplobatrachus tigerinus
Noemacheilus denisoni	Indirana semipalmata
Oreochromis mossambica	Indirana brachytarsus
Noemacheilus guentheri	Fejervarya keralensis
Glossogobius giuris giuris	Micrixalus mallani
Noemacheilus triangularis	Nyctibatrachus gavi
Awaous gutum	Clinotarsus curtipes
Lepidocephalus thermalis	Indosylvirana sreeni
Sicyopterus griseus	Indosylvirana aurantiaca
Lepidocephaluslimbatus	Indosylvirana cf. magna
Anabas testudineus	Hydrophylax malabaricus
Hyporhamphus limbatus	Raorchestes travancoricus
Macropodus cupanus	Raorchestes beddomei
Xenentodon cancila	Raorchestes ponmudi
Channa marulius	Raorchestes manohari
Aplocheilus lineatus	Pseudophilautus wynaadensis
Channa orientalis	Polypedates pseudocruciger
Heteropnuestes fossilis	Polypedates maculatus
Channa striatus	Rhacophorus malabaricus
Clarias dusuuumieri	Ghatixalus magnus
Mastacembelus armatus	Duttaphrynus beddomei
Danio malabaricus	Duttaphrynus scaber
Tetraodon travancoricus	Duttaphrynus melanostictus
Pristolepis malabarica	Duttaphrynus microtympanum
Megalops cyprinoides	Duttaphrynus parietalis
Parambassis thomassi	Uperodon taprobanicus
Anguilla bengalensis	Uperodon variegatus
Haplocheius lineatus	Uperodon montanus
Anguilla bicolar	Uperodon triangularis
Mystus montanus	Uperodon systoma
Tor khudree	Microhyla cf. laterite

For more details

==== Reptiles and mammals ====
Kerala's forests are the storehouse of many species of reptiles and mammals. Reptiles of 59 species and mammals of 34 species were reported from the forests of Ranni. The rain forests here are the habitat of the venomous King cobra. Many King cobras were caught by Vava Suresh, the snake expert and wildlife conservationist for the Angamoozhy, Chittar, and Moozhiyar regions in the Goodrical range. The mammals are also rich in number, with countless species in these forests.

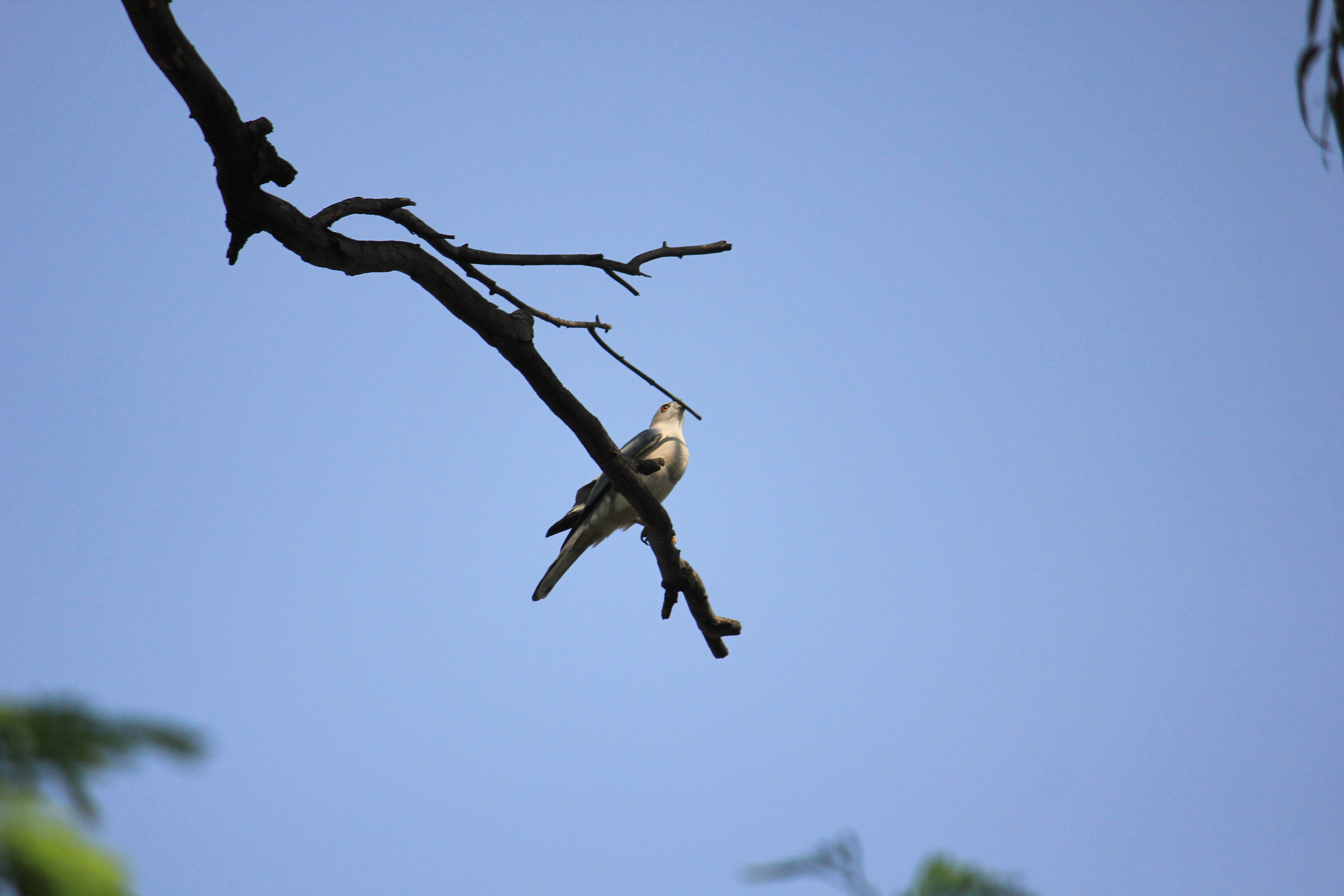
A little banded goshawk commonly found all over Indian sub continent

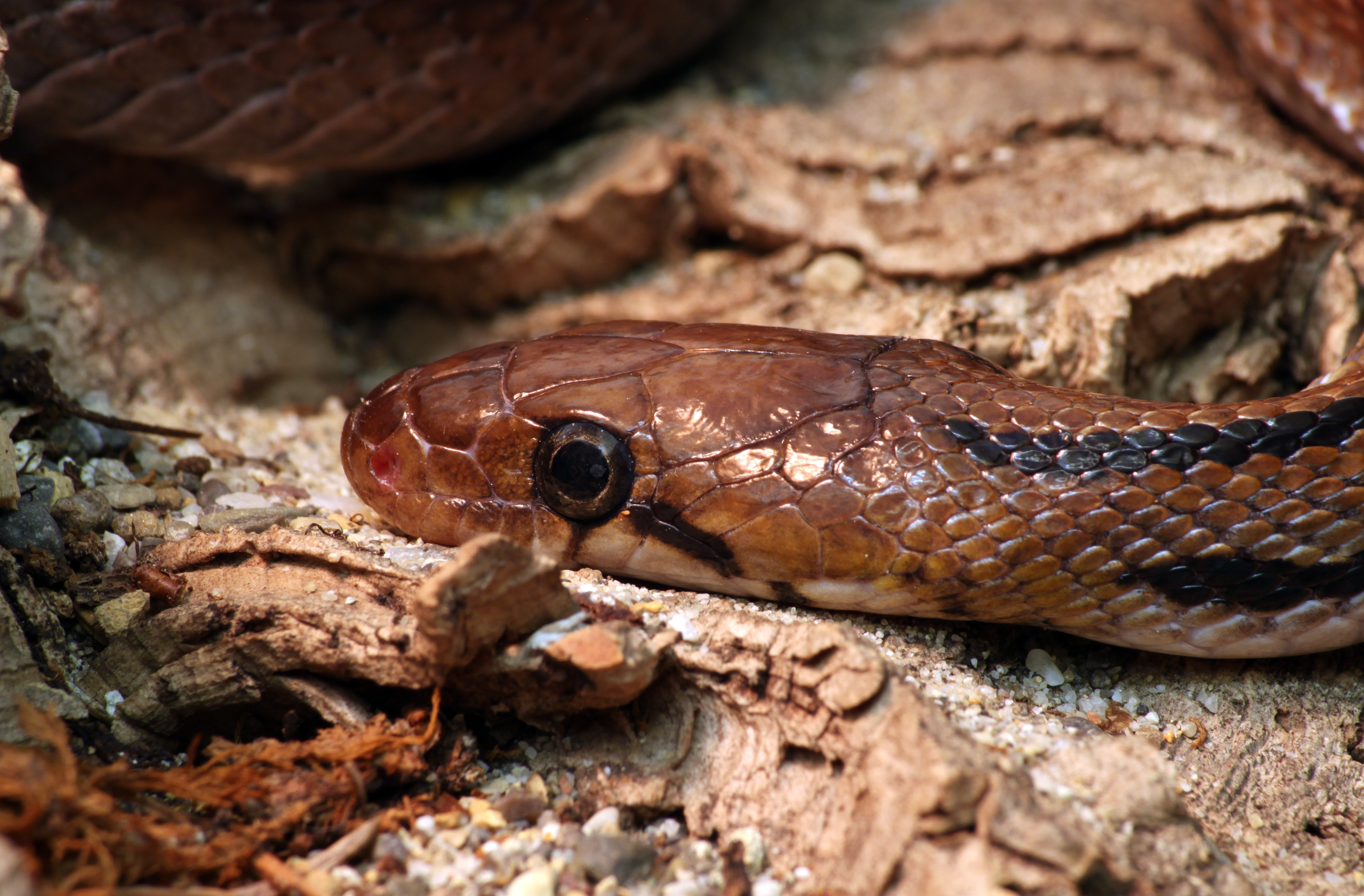
The Trinket snake (Scientific name:Coelognathus helena), a nonvenomous constrictor species of coulbrid snake

Reptiles	Birds
Melanochelys trijuga	Little cormorant
Indotestudo travancorica	Darter
Lissemys punctata punctata	Grey heron
Rhinophis travancoricus	Pond heron
Uropeltis ceylanicus	Cattle egret
Python molurus	Little egret
Cnemaspis gracilis	Night heron
Cnemaspis ornatus	Chestnut bittern
Cnemaspis beddomei	Pariah kite
Lycodon tranancoricus	Brahminy kite
Cnemaspis kandiana	Indian shikra
Lycodon aulicus	Osprey
Cyrtodactylus collegalensis	Jungle bush quali
Oilgodon taeniolatus	Red spurfowl
Hemidactylus brooki	Grey jungle fowl
Oilogodon travancoricus	Redwattled lapwing
Hemidactylus frenatus	Blue rock pigeon
Amphiesma stolata	Indian spotted dove
Hemidactylus leschenaulti	Indian emerald dove
Amphiesma beddomei	Roseringed parakeet
Hemidactylus maculatus	Indian lorikeet
Amphiesma monticola	Common hawk cuckoo
Calotes calotes	Common Indian nightjar
Xenochrophis piscator	Indian koel
Calotes elliotti	Coucal/crow pheasant
Elaphe helena	Indian barn owl
Calotes rouxi	Grey headed bublbul
Ptyas mucosus	Ruby throated bublbul
Calotes versicolor	Indian alpine swift
Dendrelaphis ttristis	Indian house swift
Draco dussumieri	Malabar trogon
Ahaetulla nasuta	Pied kingfisher
Psammophilus blanfordanus	Chestnuttheaded bee-eater
Boiga trigonata	Rufoustailed flycatcher
Chamaeleo zeylanicus	Redbreasted flycatcher
Bungarus caeruleus	Malabar greyhornbill
Mabuya macularius	Small green barbet
Naja naja	Crimsonthroated barbet
Mabuya carinata	Indian pitta
Ophiophagus hannah	Malabar crested lark
Scincella laterimaculatum	Indian golden oriole
Vipera russellii	Blackheaded oriole
Riopa punctata	Black drongo
Echis carinatus	Jungle myna
Ristella beddomii	Hill myna
Hypnale hypnale	Indian tree pie
Ristella guentheri	Southeastern tree pie
Trimeresurus malabaricus	Paddyfield warbler
Ophisops leschenaulti	Jungle crow
Bungarus faciatus	Malabar woodshrike
Varanus bengalensis	Orange minivet
Ptyas mucosus	Goldfronted chloropsis
Ramphotyphlops braminus	Fairy bluebird
Typhlina bramina	Redwhiskered bulbul
Typhlops acutus	Whitethroated ground thrush
Geochelone travancorica	Redvented bulbul
Teretrurus sanguineus	Kerala rock pipit
Lissemys punctata punctata	Tailorbird
Blue headed yellow wagtail	Uropeltis ocellatus

=== Birds ===
There are abundant species of birds in these forests, including some that face extinction. There are 196 known species of birds reported from the Ranni division.

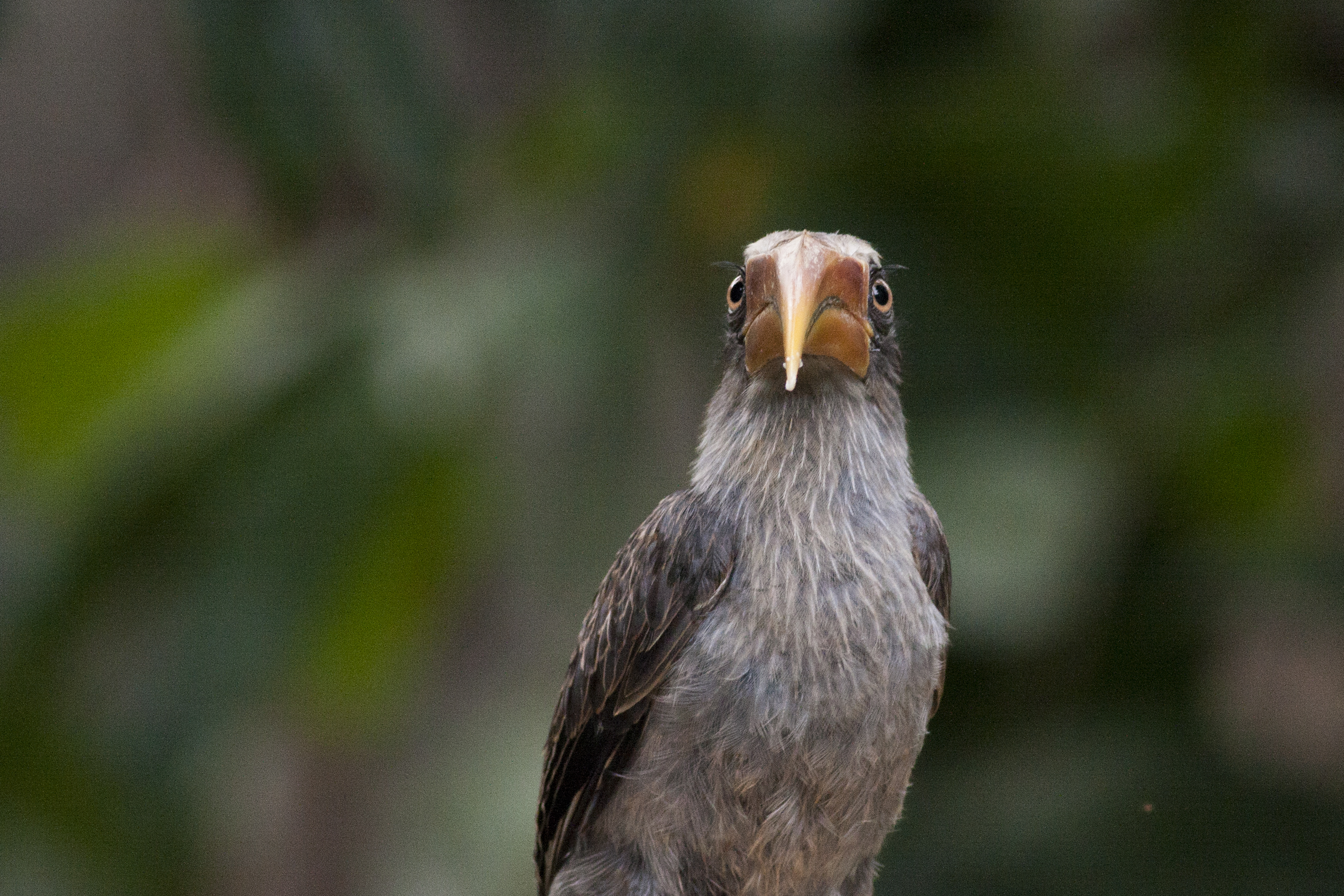
Malabar grey hornbill (Scientific name:Ocyceros griseus), a hornbill species commonly found in the Western ghats and southern India

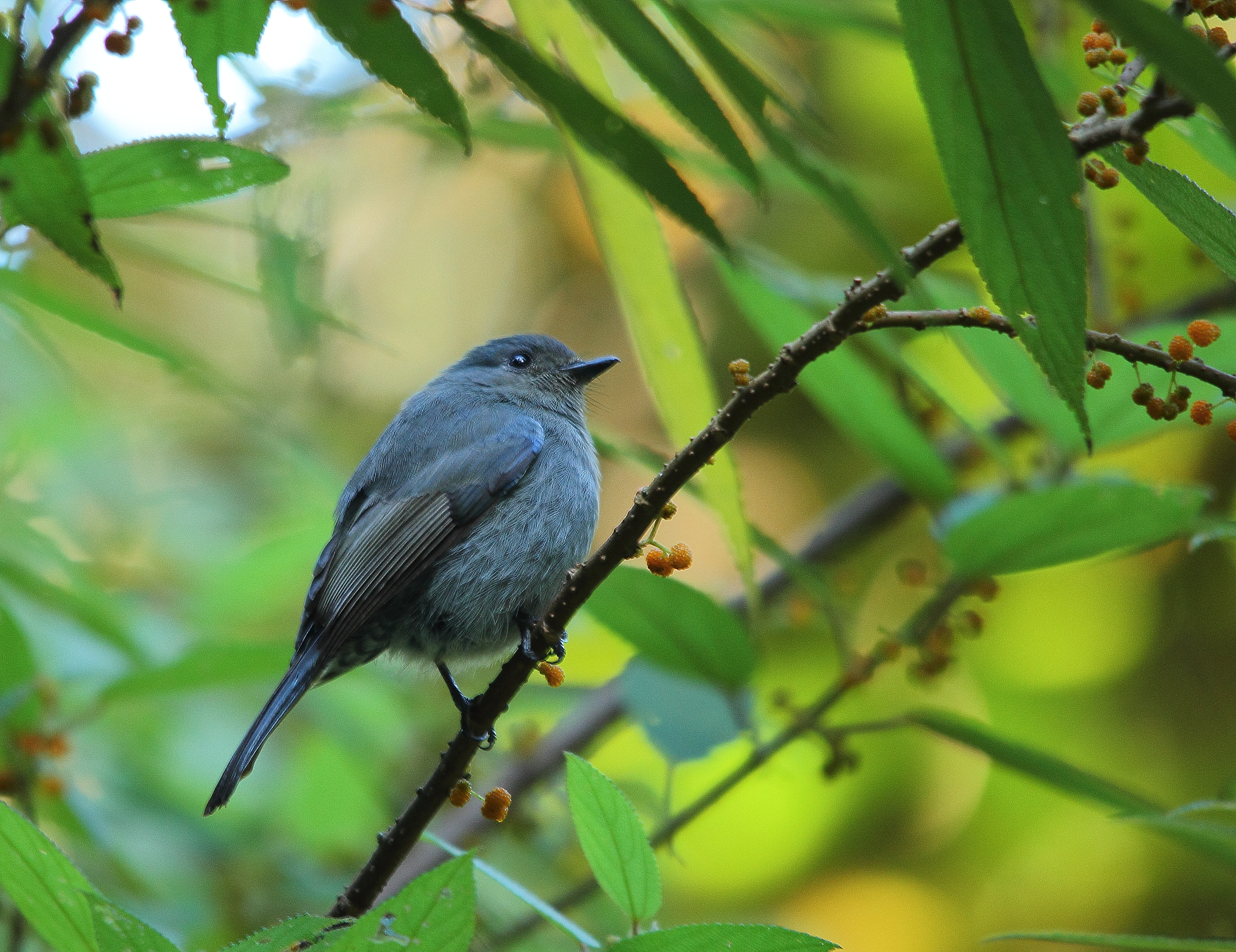
Nilgiri flycather (Scientific name:Eumyias albicaudatus), a near-threatened species similar to verditer flycatcher

List of birds in Ranni division
Column A	Column B
Little cormorant (Phalocrocorax Niger)	Greyfronted green pigeon (Trenon pampadora affinis)
Darter (Anhinga rufa)	Imperial green pigeon (Ducula aenea)
Grey heron (Ardea cinerea)	Nilgiri wood pigeon (Columba elphinstonii)
Pond heron (Ardeola grayii)	Large Indian parakeet (Pisttacula eupatria)
Cattle egret (Bubulcus ibis)	Blossom headed parakeet (Pisttacula cyanocephala)
Little egret (Egretta garsetta)	The cuckoo (Cucclus canorus)
Night heron (Nycticorax nycticorax)	Indian banded bay cuckoo (Cacomantis sonneratii)
Chestnut bittern (Ixobrychus cinnamomeus	Indian plaintive cuckoo (Cacomantis passerinus)
Pariah kite (Milvus migrans)	Drongo cuckoo (Surniculus lugubris)
Brahminy kite (Haliastur indus)	Lesser coucal (Centropus toulou)
Indian shikra (Accipiter badius)	Grass owl (Tyto capensis)
Osprey (Pandion haliaetus)	Bay owl (Phodilus badius. ripleyi
Jungle bush quali (Perdicula asiatica)	Great horned owl (Bubo bubo bengalensis)
Red spurfowl (Galloperdix spadicea)	Forest eagle owl (Bubo bubo nipalensis)
Grey jungle fowl (Gallus sonneratii)	Brown fish owl (Bubo bubo zeylonensis
Redwattled lapwing (Vanellus indicus)	Short eared owl (Asio flammeus)
Blue rock pigeon (Columba livia)	Ceylon Frogmouth (Batrachostomus monlinger)
Indian spotted dove (Streptopelia chinensis)	Great eared nightjar (Eurostopodus macrotis bourdilloni)
Indian emerald dove (Chalcophaps indica)	Bluewinged parnakeet (Psittacula columbodies)
Roseringed parakeet (Psittacula krameri)	Indian jungle nightjar (Caprimulgus asiaticus)
Indian lorikeet (Loriculus vernalis)	Indian cuckoo (Cuculus micropterus)
Common hawk cuckoo (Cuculus varius)	Longtailed nightjar (Caprimulgus macrurus)
Common Indian nightjar (Caprimulgus asiaticus)	Whiterumped spinetail swift (Chaetura sylvatica)
Indian koel (Eudynamys scolopacea)	Scops owl (Otus scops)
Coucal/Crow pheasant (Centropus sinensis)	Malabar barred jungle owlet (Glaucidium radiatum subsp)
Indian barn owl (Tyto alba)	Spotted owlet (Athene brama)
Grey headed bublbul (Pyconotus pricoephalus)	Yellow browed bulbul (Hypsipetes indicus)
Ruby throated bublbul (Pyconotus melanicterus)	Black head babbler (Rhopocichla atriceps)
Indian alpine swift (Apus melba)	Quaker babbler (Alcippe poioicephala)
Indian house swift (Apus affinis)	Brown flycatcher (Muscicapa latrirostris)
Malabar trogon (Harpactes fasciatus subsp)	Brown breasted flycatcher (Muscicapa muttui)
Pied kingfisher (Ceryle rudis)	Indian roller (Coracias benghalensis)
Chestnutheaded bee-eater (Merops Leschenaulti)	White bellied blue flycatcher (Muscicapa pallipes)
Rufoustailed flycatcher (Muscicapa ruficauda)	Blue throated flycatcher (Muscicapa rubeculoides)
Redbreasted flycatcher (Muscicapa parva)	Tickell's blue flycatche (Muscicapa tickelliae)
Malabar greyhornbill (Tockus griseus)	Verditer flycatcher (Muscicapa thalassina)
Small green barbet (Megalaima viridis)	Nilgiri flycatcher (Muscicapa albicaudata)
Crimsonthroated barbet (Megalaima rubricapilla)	White browed fantail flycatcher (Rhipidura aureola)
Indian pitta (Pitta brachyura)	Paradise flycatcher (Trepsiphone paradisi)
Malabar crested lark (Galerida malabarica)	Black naped flycatcher. (Hypothymis azurea)
Indian golden oriole (Oriolus oriolus)	Streaked fantail warbler (Listicola juncidis salimalii)
Blackheaded oriole (Oriolus xanthornus)	Franklin's wren Warbler (Primia hodgsoni)
Jungle myna (Acridotheres fuscus)	Thickbilled warbler (Acrocephalus aedon)
Hill myna (Gracula religiosa)	Indian great reed warbler (Acrocephalus aedon)
Indian tree pie (Dendrocitta vagabunda)	House crow (Corvus splendens)
Southeastern tree pie (Dendrocitta vagabunda subsp)	Tytler's leaf warbler (Phylloscopus tytleri)
Paddyfield warbler (Acrocephalus agricola)	Largebilled leaf warbler (Phylloscopus magnirostris)
Jungle crow (Corvus macrohynohos)	Blue chat (Erithacus svecicus)
Malabar woodshirke (Tephrodornis gularis)	Shama (Copsychus saularis)
Orange minivet (Pericrocotus flammeus)	Indian robin (Saxicoloides caprata)
Goldfronted chloropsis (Chloropsis auriforns)	Pied ground thrush (Zoothera wardii)
Fairy bluebird (Irena puella)	Orange headed ground thrush (Zoothera citrina)
Redwhiskered bulbul (Pycnonotus jocosus)	Whiteheaded babbler (Turdoides affinis)
Whitethroated ground thrush (Zootera citrina cyanotus)	Grey headed yellow wagtail. (Motacilla flava)
Redvented bulbul (Pycnonotus cafer)	Magpie robin (Copsychus saularis)
Kerala rock pipit (Anthus similis)	Malbar whistling thrush (Myiophoneus horsfieldii)
Tailorbird (Orthotomus sutorius)	Yellow backed wagtail (Motacilla flava tutea)
Blue headed yellow wagtail (Motacilla flava beema)	Grey wagtail (Motacilla cinerea)
Indian grey tit (Parus major)	Forest wagtail (Motacilla indica)
Velvetfronted nuthatch (Sitta frontalis)	Tickell's flowerpecker (Dicaeum erythrorhynchos)
Large pied wagtail (Motacilla madera spatensis)	Purple rumped sunbird (Nictarinia zeylonica)
Small sunbird (Nectarinia minima)	Indian shag (Podiceps fuscicollis)
Indian house sparrow (Passer domesticus)	Large cormorabt (Podiceps carbo)
Little Gerbe (Podiceps ruficollis)	Purple Heron (Ardea purpurea)
Loten's sunbird (Nictarinia lotenia)	Large egret (Ardea alba)
Purple sunbird (Nictarinia asiatica)	Little spiderhunter (Arachnothera longirostris)
Yellow backed sunbird Aethopyga siparaja)	Yellowthroated sparrow (Petronia xanthocollis)
Little green heron (Ardeola striatus)	Open bill stork (Anastomus oscitans)
Smaller egert (Egretta intermedia)	Travancore baya (Ploceus philippinus travancoreensis)
Yellow bittern (Ixobrychus sinensis)	Red munia (Estrilda amandava)
White necked stork (Ciconia episcopus)	White throated Munia (Lonchura malabarica)
Pintail (Anas acuta)	Spotted munia (Lonchura punctulata)
Spot bill duck (Anas poecilorhyncha)	Black head munia (Lonchura malacca)
Garganey (Anas querquedula)	Common rose finch (Carpodacus erythrinus)
Black crested Baza (Aviceda lephotes)	Bush lark (Mirafra assamica)
Black winged kite (Elanus caeruleus vociferus)	Crag martin (Hirundo rupestris)
Sparrow hawk (Accipiter nisus)	Eastern swallow (Hirundo rustica gutturalis)
Cresested hawk eagle (Spizaetus cirrhatus)	Indian cliff swallow (Hirundo fluvicola)
Dusky cragmartin (Hirundo concolor)	House martin (Delichon urbica)
Booted hawk eagle (Hieraaetus pennatus)	Brown shrike (Lanius cristatus)
Black eagle (Ictinaetus malayensis perniger)	Ashy drango (Dicrurus adsimilis)
Grey shrike (Lanius excubitor)	Short toed eagle (Circaetus gallicus gallicus)
Greyheaded fishing eagle (Ichthyophaga ichthyaetus)	Common myna (Acridotherestristis)
Racket – tailed drango (Dicrurus paradiseus)	Common iora (Aegithina tiphia)
Greyheaded myna (Sturnus malabaricus)	Common kingfisher (Alcedo atthis)
Crested serpent eagle (Spilornis cheela melanotis)	Threetoed kingfisher (Ceyx erithacus)
Redheaded merllin (Falco chicquera)	White breasted kingfisher. (Hakyon smyrensis)
Kestrel (Falco tinnunculus)	Blue eared kingfisher (Alcedo meninting)
Indian kestrel (Falco tinnunculus objurgatus)	Bluebearded bee-eater (Nyctyornis athertoni)
Banded crake (Rallina urizonoides)	Broadbilled roller (Eurystomus orientalis)W
White breasted waterhen (Amaurornis phoenicurus)	Malabar pied hornbill (Anthracoceros coronatus)
Watercock (Gallicrex cinerea)	Rufous woodpecker (Micropternus brachyurns jerdonii)
Pheasant tailed jacana (Hydrophasianus chirurugus)	Speckled piculet (Picumnus innominatus)
Painted snipe (Rostratula bengalensis)	Pigmy wood pecker (Picoides nanus)
Blackwinged stilt (Himantopus himantopus)	Green sandpiper (Tringa ochropus)
Little ringed plover (Charadrius dubius)	Black backed wood pecker (Crysocolaptes festivus)
Heart spotted woodpecker (Hemicircus canente)	Common sandpiper (Tringa hypoleucos)
Common tern (Sterna hirundo)

== Tribal settlements ==
The forest ranges of Ranni are inhabited by many tribal communities, mainly the Ulladan, Vettuvan and Malavedan, each having their own traditions and beliefs.

Settlements	Communities
Kakkudukka	Ulladan
Mannadisala	Ulladan
Chollanavayal	Malavedan
Kudamurutty	Malappandaram
Paruva	Ulladan
Ariyanjilimannu	Malavedan
Manakkayam	Malaoorali
Naranamthodu	Vanakudi
Lahai	Adiyan, Ulladan
Kurumbanmoozhy	Ulladan
Attathodu	Malapandaram
Velamplavu	Ulladan
Kattachira	Ulladan, Vettuvan
Kodumudi	Ulladan, Vettuvan
Kumaramkunnu	Malavedan, Adiyan
Olikkallu	Vettuvan
Pambini	Ulladan
Allumkal	Vettuvan
Bhayanankaramudi	Kani, Arayan
Chippankuzhy	Kani, Ulladan

== See also ==
- Department of Forests and Wildlife (Kerala)
- Ranni
- Vadasserikkara
