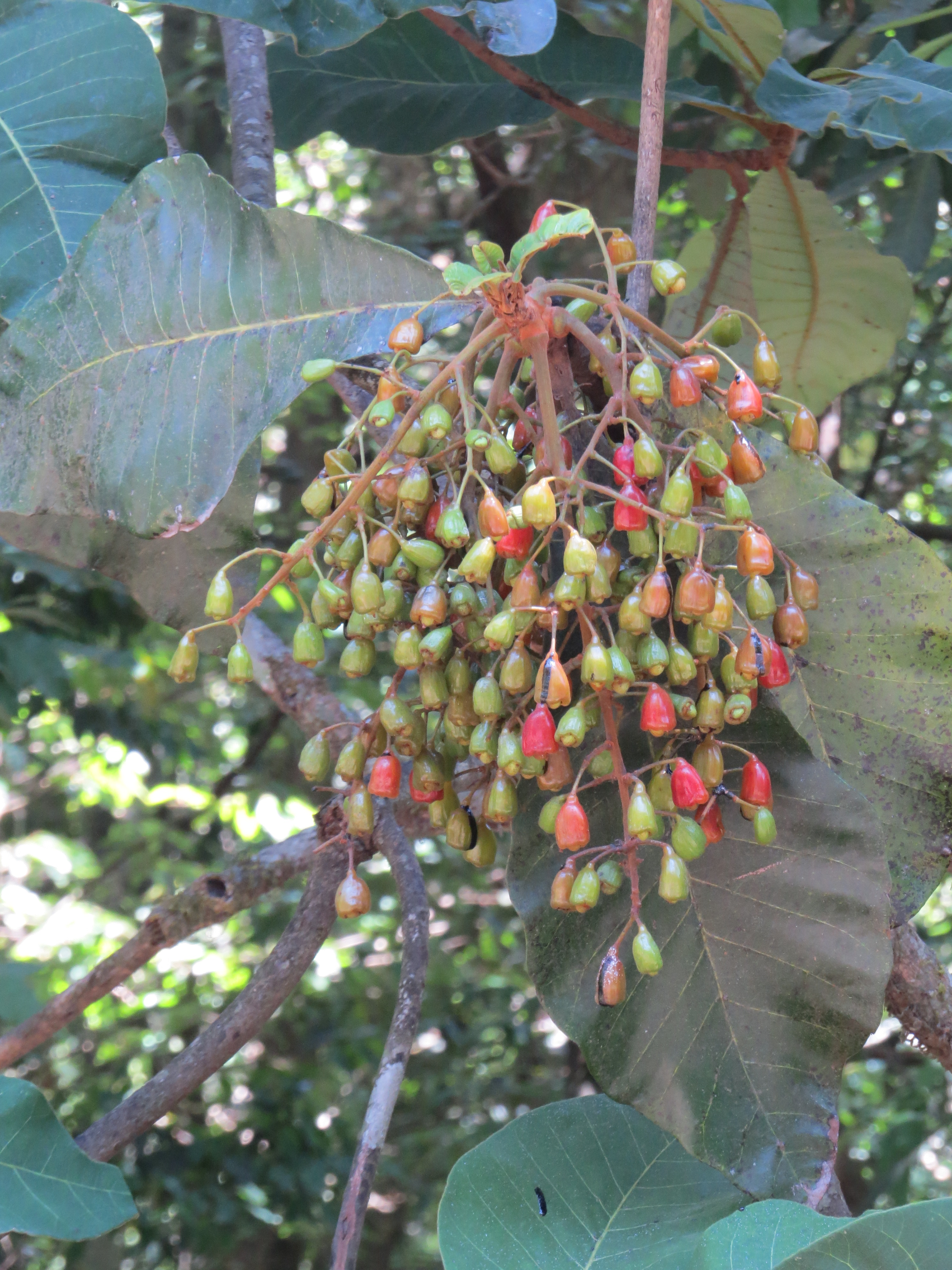
- Holigarna grahamii

Scientific classification
- Kingdom: Plantae
- Clade: Tracheophytes
- Clade: Angiosperms
- Clade: Eudicots
- Clade: Rosids
- Order: Sapindales
- Family: Anacardiaceae
- Subfamily: Anacardioideae
- Genus: Holigarna; Buch.-Ham. ex Roxb.

Species
- See text

= Holigarna =

Genus of trees

Holigarna is a genus of trees in the subfamily Anacardioideae of the cashew and sumac family Anacardiaceae. They grow naturally in India, Bangladesh and Indo-China. Holigarna arnottiana may cause an allergic reaction and irritate the skin chemically. Inhaling this species' wood smoke may be hazardous.

== Species ==
The Plant List and Catalogue of Life recognise about 7 accepted species, while Plants of the world Online has 9 accepted species:

- Holigarna albicans Hook.f.
- Holigarna arnottiana Hook.f.
- Holigarna beddomei Hook.f.
- Holigarna caustica (Dennst.) Oken
- Holigarna ferruginea Marchand
- Holigarna grahamii (Wight) Kurz
- Holigarna helferi Hook.f.
- Holigarna kurzii King
- Holigarna nigra Bourd.
