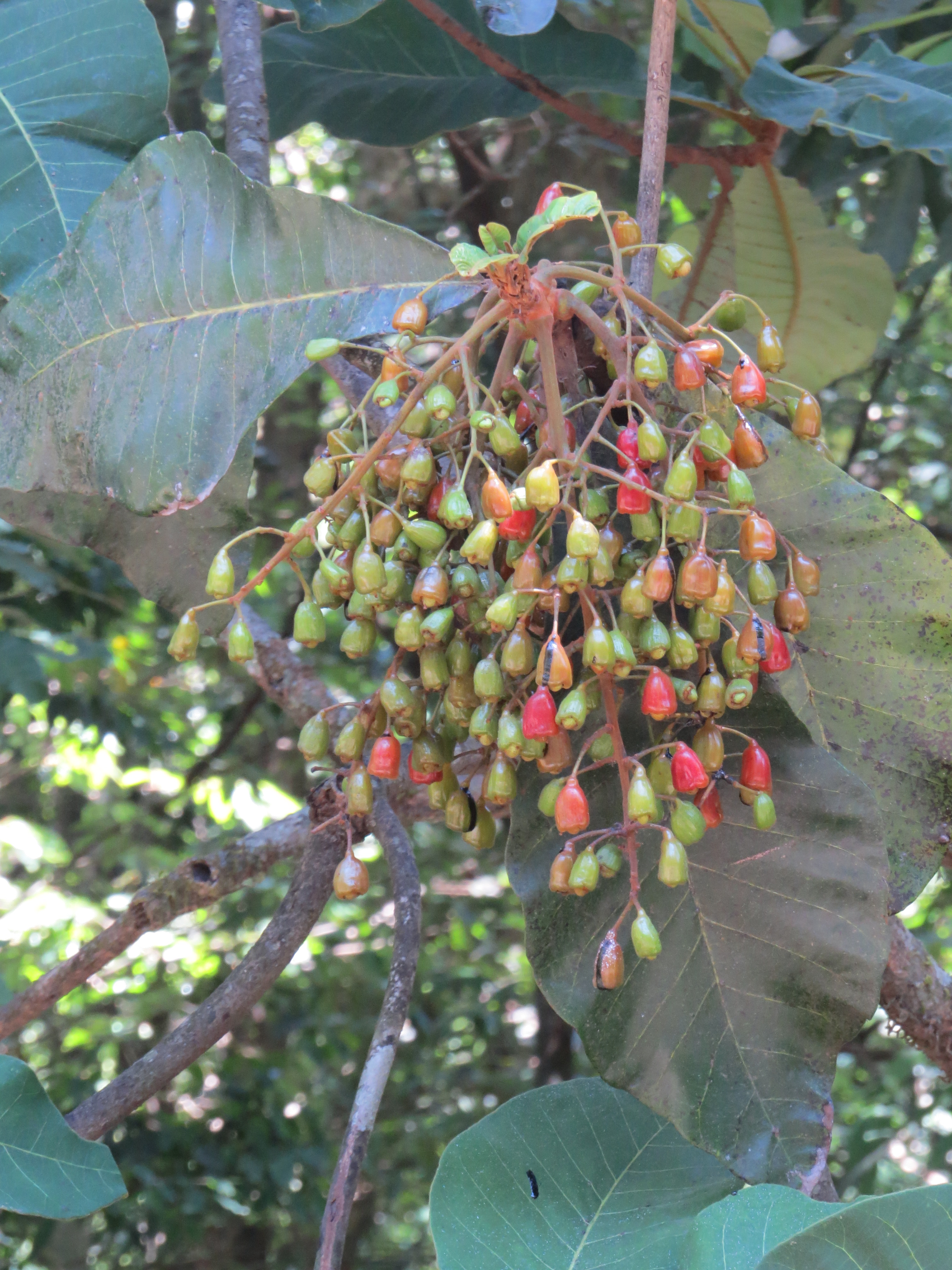
- Holigarna grahamii fruiting branch

Scientific classification
- Kingdom: Plantae
- Clade: Tracheophytes
- Clade: Angiosperms
- Clade: Eudicots
- Clade: Rosids
- Order: Sapindales
- Family: Anacardiaceae
- Genus: Holigarna
- Species: H. grahamii

Binomial name
- Holigarna grahamii (Wight) Kurz

Synonyms
- List: Holigarna grahamii Hook.f.; Holigarna wightii N.P.Balakr.; Katou-tsjeroe grahamii (Hook.f.) Kuntze; Semecarpus grahamii Wight

= Holigarna grahamii =

Plant species in the cashew family

Holigarna grahamii is a large tree belonging to the family Anacardiaceae. It is found in western India. It grows primarily in the seasonally dry tropical biome.

== Description ==
Holigarna grahamii is a tall tree reaching as much as 35 meters in height. The diameter of the trunk reaches a maximum of 3.2 meters. Its leaves cluster towards the ends of its branches and are attached alternately. They are simple and rhomboidal, shaped like a diamond. Their undersides are tomentose, covered in dense, matted, woolly hairs. Leaves can measure 15 to 45 centimeters in length with a width of 10 to 20 cm.

The flowers are in panicles at the ends of branches. They are white and polygamous, having flowers with both pollen and seed producing parts or just one on the same tree. The fruit is an ellipsoid, elliptical on the longer axis, and measure 2.5 cm with the seed partly sticking out.
