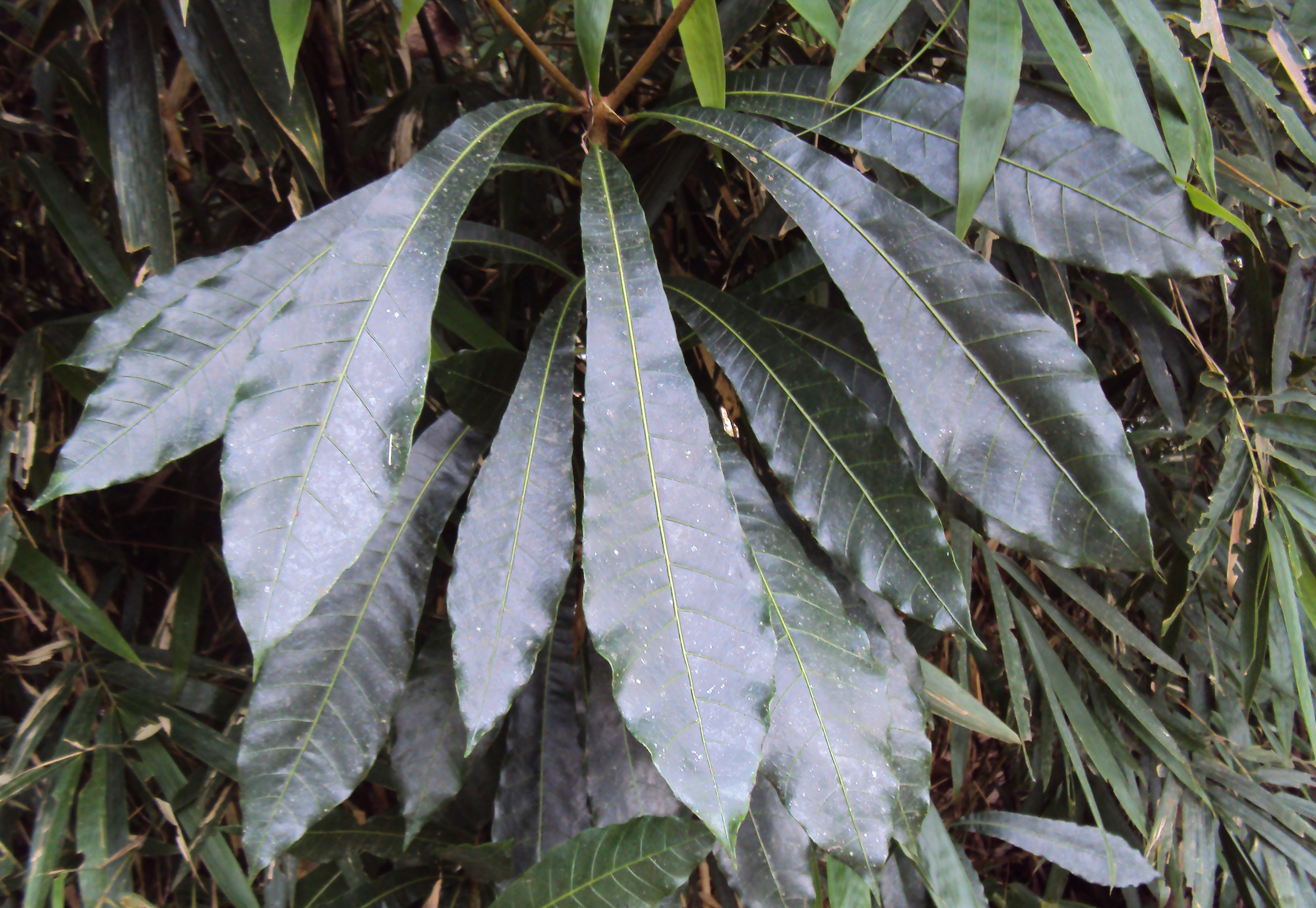
- Holigarna arnottiana leaves

Scientific classification
- Kingdom: Plantae
- Clade: Tracheophytes
- Clade: Angiosperms
- Clade: Eudicots
- Clade: Rosids
- Order: Sapindales
- Family: Anacardiaceae
- Genus: Holigarna
- Species: H. arnottiana

Binomial name
- Holigarna arnottiana Hook.f.

= Holigarna arnottiana =

Species of flowering plant

Holigarna arnottiana is a deciduous tree belonging to family Anacardiaceae. This tree is distributed along South West parts of India and is endemic to Western Ghats, from Central and South Sahyadris. It is commonly known as black varnish tree or Malabar marking nut or കരിഞ്ചേര്. The sap of this tree is considered as allergen due to the presence of urushiol compounds.

== Description ==
A large tree, with finely fissured bark. White latex turning black upon contact with air. Leaves are simple, alternate, arranged spirally, clustered at twig ends. Flowers are borne in panicles, 12–24 cm long, golden yellow pubescent, in leaf axils or at branch ends. Flowers are polygamous, greenish white. Fruit is obliquely ovoid, 1-seeded.

== Ecology ==
Canopy trees in wet evergreen to semi-evergreen and moist deciduous forests having elevation of 400 to 1200 m.

== Phenology ==
Flowering and Fruiting: January–July.

== Uses ==
In Ayurveda, the plant is believed to be helpful in treatment of inflammation, arthritis, haemorrhoids, obesity, tumors, cancer, and skin diseases. It is estimated that bio-Fabricated Silver Nanoparticles from the Leaf Extract of Holigarna arnottiana had antimicrobial, antimitotic, anticancer, and radical-scavenging properties.
