= Holigarna beddomei =

Scientific classification
- Kingdom: Plantae
- Clade: Tracheophytes
- Clade: Angiosperms
- Clade: Eudicots
- Clade: Rosids
- Order: Sapindales
- Family: Anacardiaceae
- Genus: Holigarna
- Species: H. beddomei

Binomial name
- Holigarna beddomei Hook.f.

Species of flowering plant

Holigarna beddomei is a deciduous tree belonging to family Anacardiaceae. Native to the Western Ghats of southwestern India, it grows as a large tree up to 35 meters tall in seasonally dry tropical forests and is notable for exuding a black, juicy latex from its smooth bark.

== Description ==
A lofty tree that exudes a black, juicy latex; the bark is smooth. Young leaves have ciliate margins with long hairs, while mature leaves are pubescent on the underside, with 20–30 pairs of lateral nerves; the petiole is long, slender, and persistent.

== Distribution ==
Frequent in evergreen forests of South West India.

== Phenology ==
Flowering: February–March; Fruiting: April–June.
