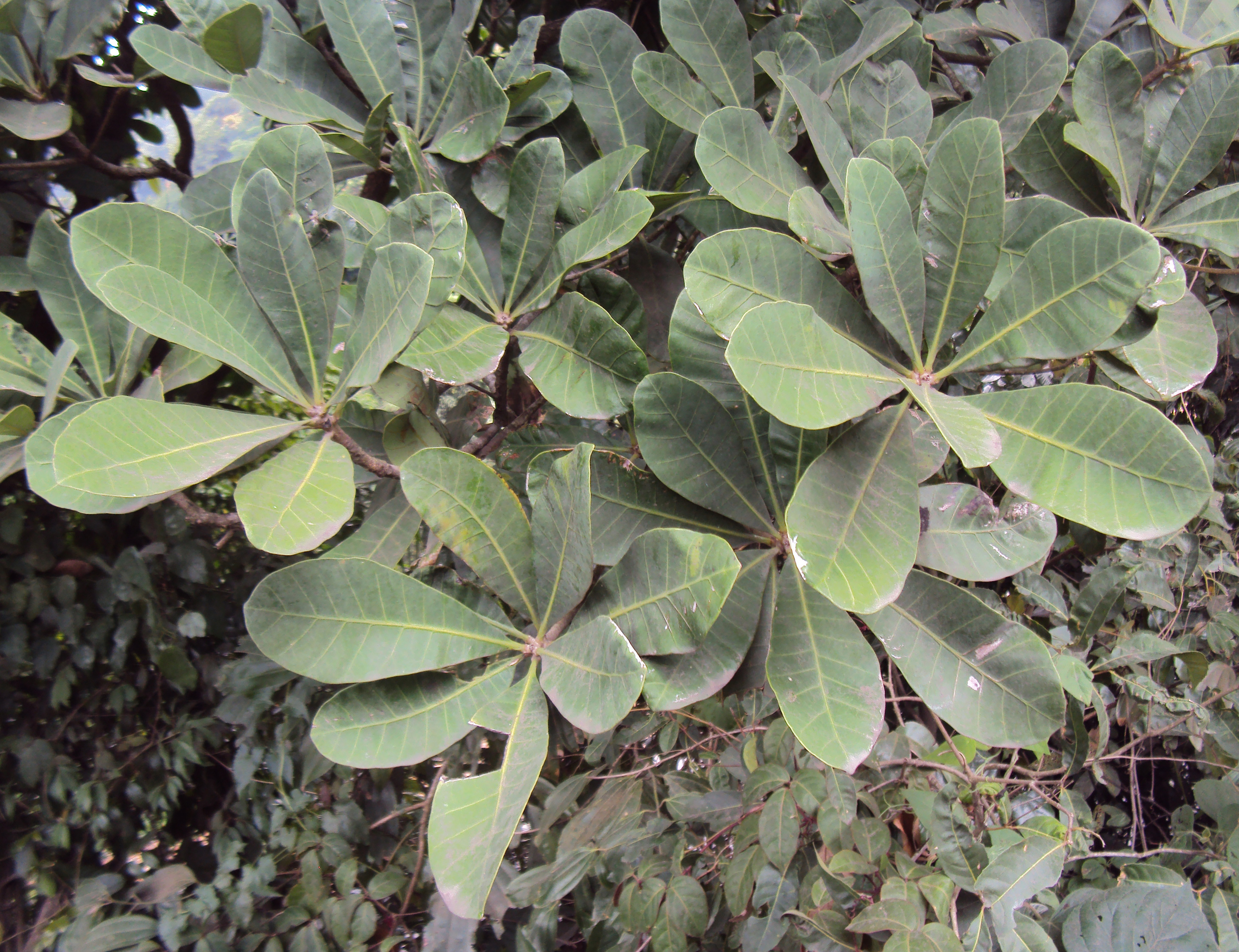

Scientific classification
- Kingdom: Plantae
- Clade: Tracheophytes
- Clade: Angiosperms
- Clade: Eudicots
- Clade: Rosids
- Order: Sapindales
- Family: Anacardiaceae
- Genus: Holigarna
- Species: H. nigra

Binomial name
- Holigarna nigra Bourd.

= Holigarna nigra =

Species of flowering plant

Holigarna nigra is a deciduous tree belonging to the family Anacardiaceae.

== Description ==
A large tree producing a black, caustic exudate; branches are glabrous. Leaves are simple, alternate, and spathulate, with a cuneate base, entire margins, and an obtuse or occasionally retuse apex; surfaces glabrous. Lateral veins 6–10 pairs, parallel and prominent; intercostae reticulate. Petioles 1.5–2.5 cm long, each bearing a pair of deciduous spurs.

== Distribution ==
Frequent in evergreen forests of South West India.

== Phenology ==
Flowering: February–March; fruiting: April–June.
