= Awaous gutum =

Scientific classification
- Kingdom: Animalia
- Phylum: Chordata
- Class: Actinopterygii
- Order: Gobiiformes
- Family: Oxudercidae
- Subfamily: Gobionellinae
- Genus: Awaous
- Species: A. gutum

Binomial name
- Awaous gutum Hamilton, 1822

Species of fish

Awaous gutum is a fish of genus Awaous found in the Lower Padma River, Ganges River system, Bangladesh. FishBase considers the name to be a junior synonym of the Gangetic tank goby, Glossogobius giuris, but Eschmeyer's Catalog of Fishes considers it valid.
