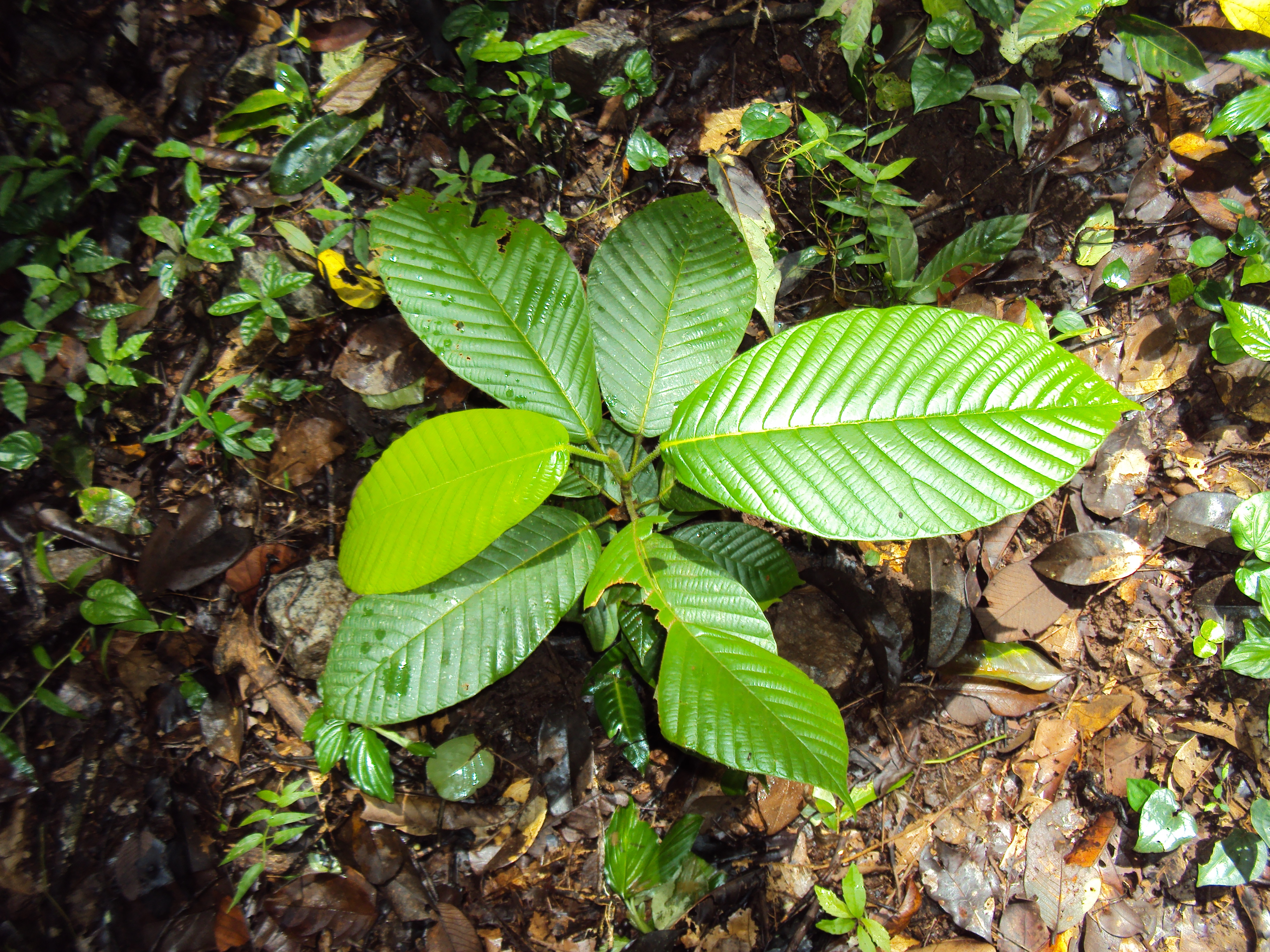

Conservation status
- Critically Endangered (IUCN 3.1)

Scientific classification
- Kingdom: Plantae
- Clade: Tracheophytes
- Clade: Angiosperms
- Clade: Eudicots
- Clade: Rosids
- Order: Malvales
- Family: Dipterocarpaceae
- Genus: Dipterocarpus
- Species: D. bourdillonii

Binomial name
- Dipterocarpus bourdillonii Brandis

= Dipterocarpus bourdillonii =

Species of tree

Dipterocarpus bourdillonii is a species of large tree in the family Dipterocarpaceae endemic to the Western Ghats principally in the state of Kerala in India. It is a Critically Endangered species according to the IUCN Red List of Threatened Species. It is a characteristic tree of the low-elevation tropical wet evergreen rainforests in the Western Ghats.

== Description ==
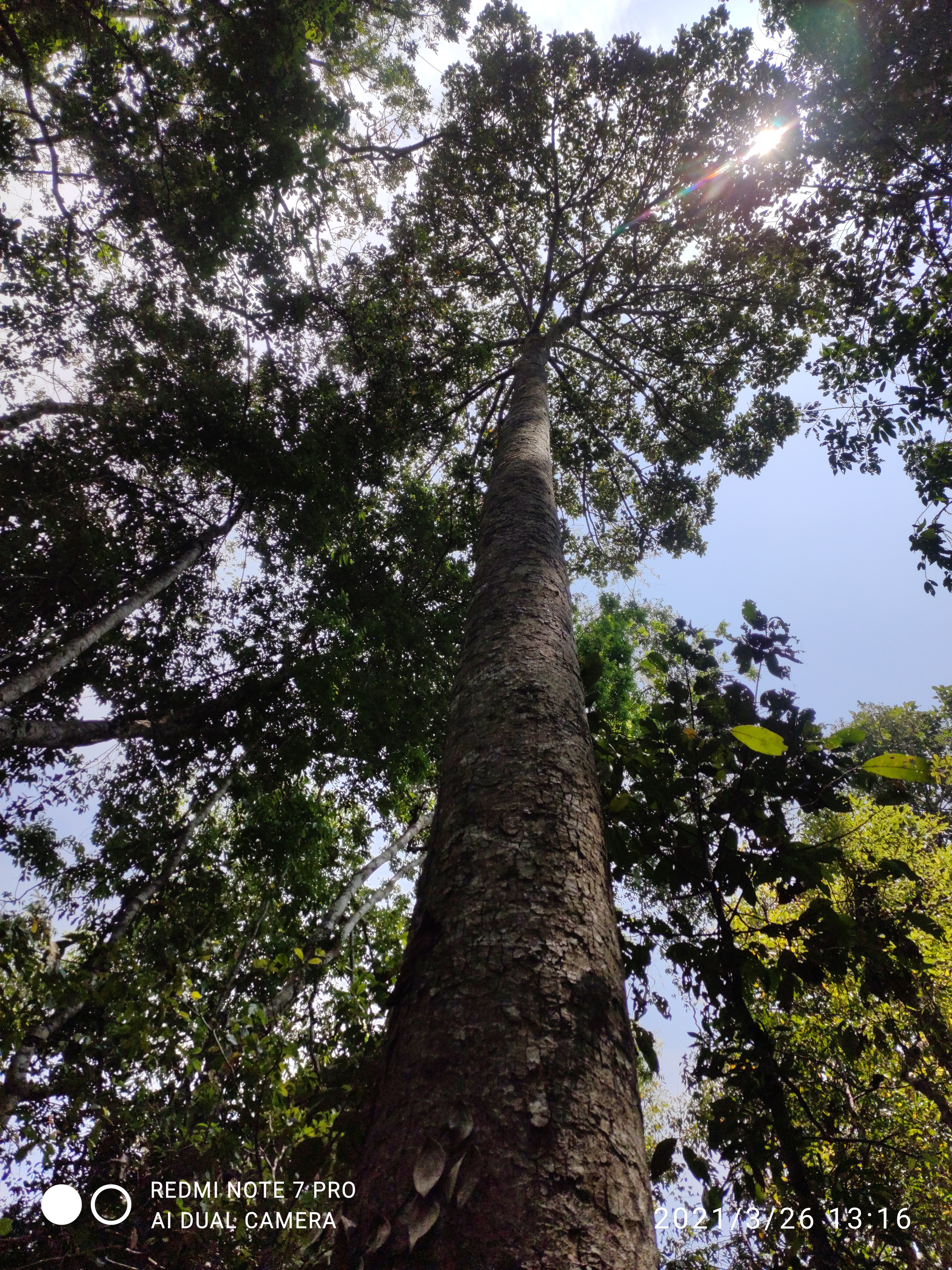
Mature tree showing tall, straight bole and dome-like canopy

Tall, evergreen trees, up to 49 m (161 ft) tall, with grey bark that flakes off irregularly in mature trees. The tree trunk develops as a straight bole, and may develop buttresses at the base, forming a dome-like canopy at the top.

The young parts such as shoot tip and leaf buds are covered with dense brownish hairs. The leaves are simple, alternate, with large stipules that drop off, leaving an annular scar. The leaf petiole is 4–5.5 cm (1.6–2.2 in) long, swollen at the apex, and tomentose. The leaves are large, about 18–45 cm (7.1–17.7 in) long by 12–25 cm (4.7–9.8 in) broad. The leaf blade is ovate or obovate in shape, thick, with stellate hairs on the lower surface and glabrous or with sparse, silky hairs on the upper surface. There are 13–23 pairs of lateral veins that are parallel and raised on the lower surface. The leaf base is rounded or subcordate tapering gradually or abruptly to a pointed tip.

The flowers are bisexual, in axillary racemes of three to five flowers, each about 10 cm (3.9 in) long. The flowers have five calyx segments, of which two are elongated into wings, while the other three are shorter and triangular. The sepals of the calyx are green and red-tinged, especially the two that elongate into the wings of the fruit. The calyx tube is distinctly ribbed. The flowers are about 3.5 to 5 cm (1.4 to 2.0 in) long, with pinkish and white petals. The flowers have about 30 stamens; the superior ovary is 3-loculed, with two ovules per locule, with a finely cylindrical style that has silky hairs on lower half. The fruit is a nut, about 2 cm (0.79 in) in diameter attached to thickened, accrescent calyx lobes. The calyx tube is about 3.5 cm (1.4 in) in diameter, 5 winged, with two elongated, wing-like calyx segments about 10 cm (3.9 in) long by 2 cm (0.79 in) wide.

== Taxonomy ==
The species was described by Dietrich Brandis, after the forester T. F. Bourdillon. It co-occurs in the Western Ghats with Dipterocarpus indicus, from which it differs in having a hairy shoot apex and ribbed calyx tube (glabrous shoot apex and smooth calyx tube in D. indicus).

== Common names ==
The species is known by a number of names in local languages:

Kannada: Dhuma; Malayalam: Chiratta-anjili, Kalpayin, Karanjili; Tamil: Karanjili; Kadar: Aeralan

== Distribution and status ==
Dipterocarpus bourdillonii is endemic to the Western Ghats. It is reported to occur in low-elevation tropical wet evergreen rainforest along river courses at elevations between 175 and 650 m (574 and 2,133 ft) above sea level. The species is distributed across some 23 locations, mainly in Kerala and southern Karnataka. In Kodagu district of Karnataka a study reported only 14 individuals of the species in three patches. Some of the known locations of the species include in Karnataka]: Kodagu and Mari Gunty; and in Kerala: Aralam Wildlife Sanctuary: Chavachi thodu; Attappadi: Chittoor River; Mannarkkad: Meenvallam; Urulamthanni: Pinavurkudi; Pooyamkutty: Manikandanchal; Muzhiyar: Moonnumukku; Periyar Tiger Reserve: Pampa; and Achenkoil: Vazhaperiyar, Kallar valley. In 2021–22, a population of at least 40 mature individuals was recorded in the Anamalai Tiger Reserve, Tamil Nadu.

According to the IUCN Red List, the global population is estimated to number less than 250 mature individuals, and no sub-population has over 50 individuals. This species is estimated to have an extent of occurrence of 27,803 km^{2} (10,735 sq mi) and a relatively small area of occupancy (96 km^{2} (37 sq mi), and unlikely to exceed 500 km^{2} (190 sq mi)). As a result the species is classified as Critically Endangered.

== Breeding system and dispersal ==
Studies on the reproductive biology, pollination, and dispersal of the species carried out in Kerala have yielded insights into the breeding system. The species is reported to flower between mid-November to late-December, with the fruits maturing by May. The inflorescence originates from leaf axils as clusters of 5–7 flowers arranged alternately, and they mature to produce flowers in 14–16 days. The trees remain flowering for about 14–20 days, with one flower in each inflorescence opening on alternate days, or rarely on consecutive days or the same day. The flowers begin to open at dusk around 6:45 p.m. and are fully open around 7:15 p.m, by which time, the flower has viable pollen grains and receptive stigma. While about 95% of the pollen grains become non-viable by 24 hours, the stigma remains receptive even 20 hours after flower opening.

Pollination is carried out mainly by insects, chiefly two species of honey bees, Apis cerana indica and Apis dorsata, in Kerala. The latter species visits more flowers and moves longer distances and may be more responsible for cross-pollination. Dipterocarpus bourdillonii appears to be self-incompatible and appears to depend on cross-pollination by insects for production of viable fruits. Of the six ovules in each fruit, only one matures into the seed, while the remaining ovules degenerate. After 60–65 days after flower opening, the maturing fruits turn brown and begin to dry on the tree itself. The mature, dry winged fruits are available on the tree about 75–80 days after flower opening. The winged fruits are wind-dispersed just before the South-west monsoon. Flowering, fruit development, and dispersal are relative synchronous across individuals the population. While the flowers are known to be attacked by Dipteran and Lepidopteran insects, the fruits are attacked by weevils.

Plant propagation studies indicated poor germination (<1%) from seeds sown in soil beds, low to medium survival (12% to 54%) of transplanted wildlings, and risk of attack by a stem boring insect Sahyadrassus malabaricus (Moore), a moth in the Family Hepialidae, that causes a loss of up to 60% of the planted seedlings. The seedlings attained a mean height of 72 cm (28 in) (maximum: 148 cm; 58 in) after 2 years.

== Conservation ==
Less than 250 mature individuals of the species exist, in 24 locations along the Western Ghats, with some locations having only 1-5 mature individuals and no location with more than 50 mature individuals. The low population size affects the conservation prospects of the species, besides possibly leading to genetic problems. According to studies carried out in Kerala, Dipterocarpus bourdillonii shows deficient pollinator populations and degenerating embryos in over 90% of fruits/seeds, suggesting abnormalities in the breeding system, possibly due to inbreeding. However, the moderate survival of transplanted wildlings suggests that this could be used as a strategy for in situ conservation and restoration of the species.

== Gallery ==
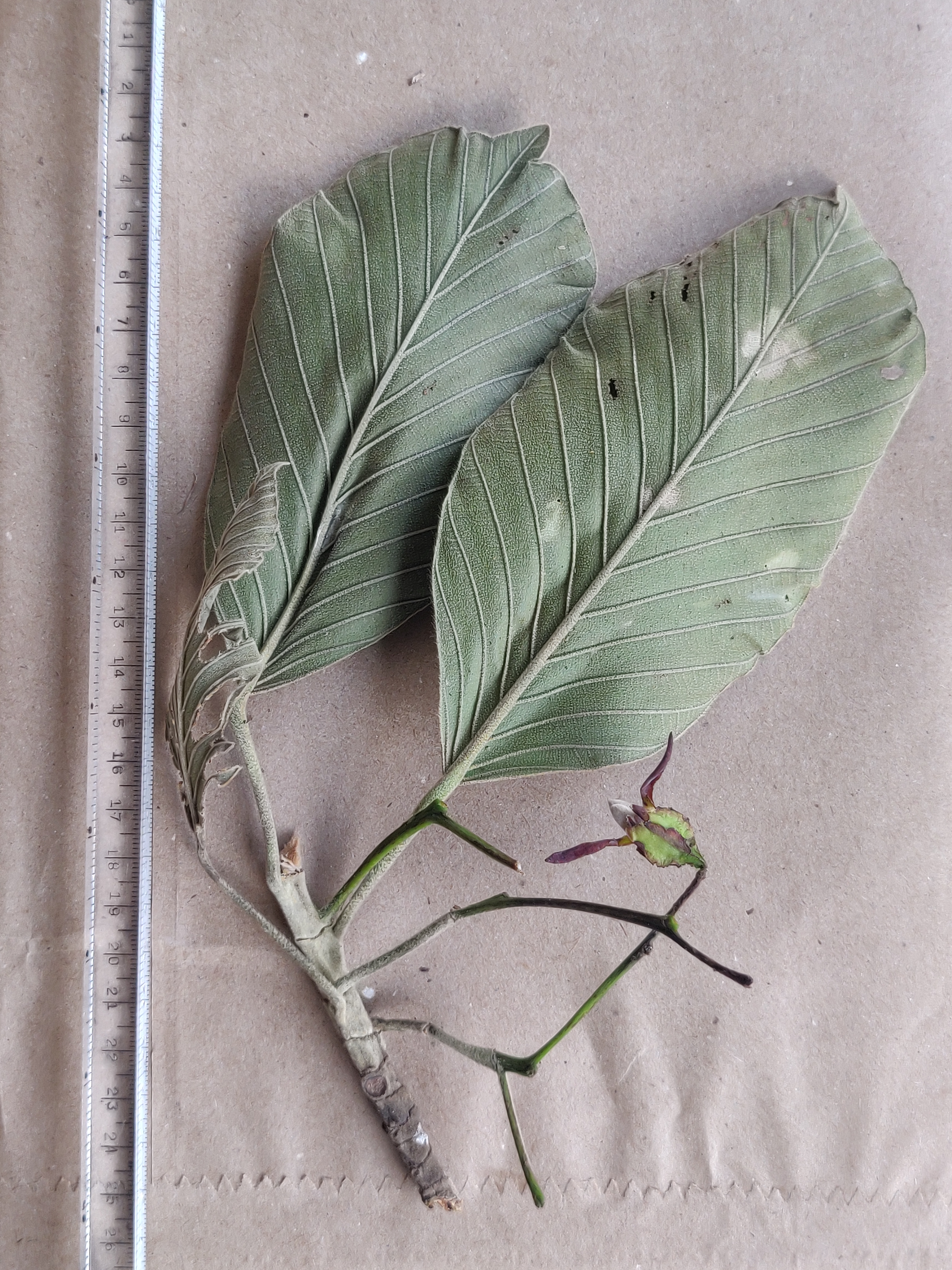
Twig with flower

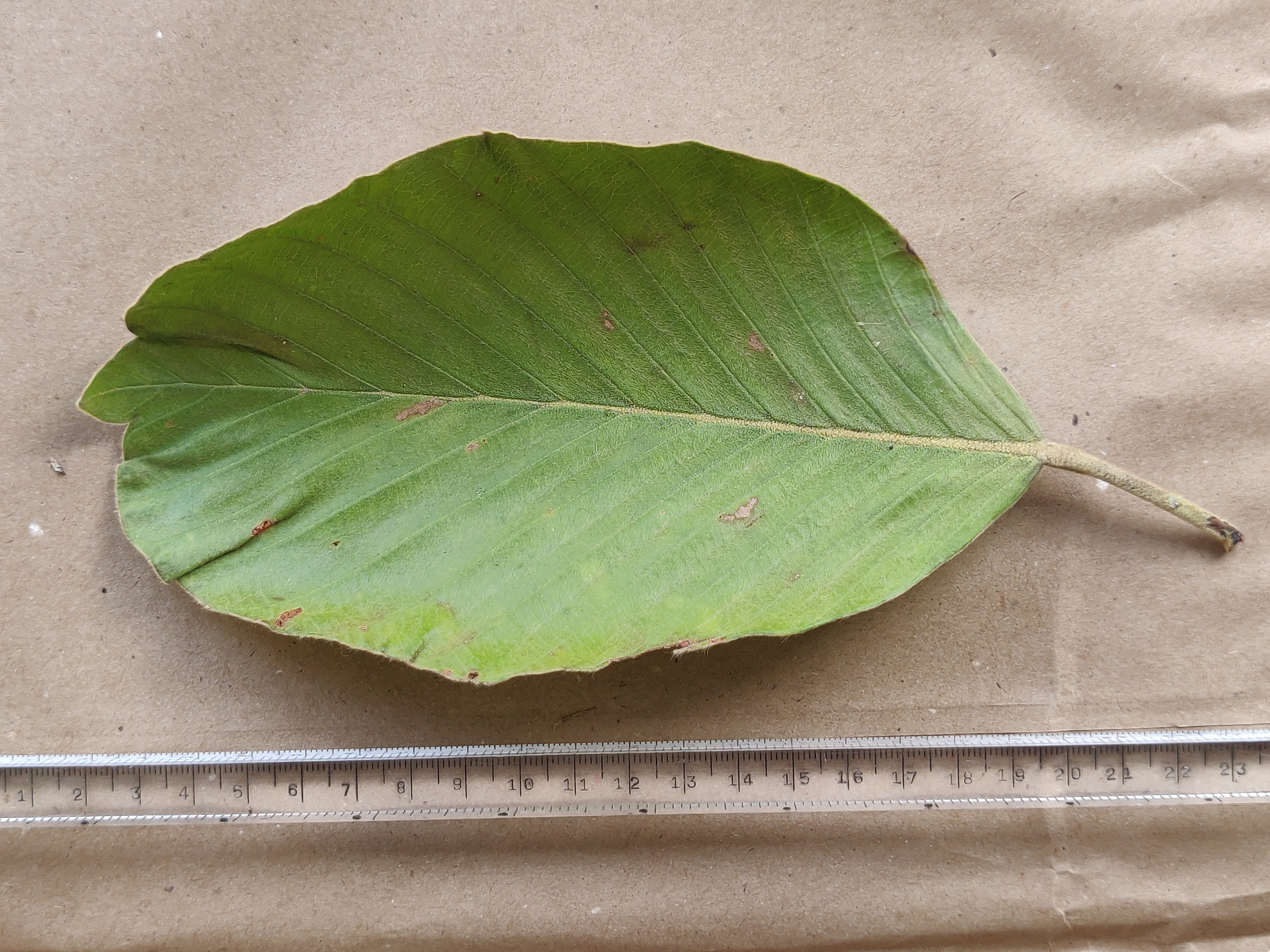
Leaf upper surface

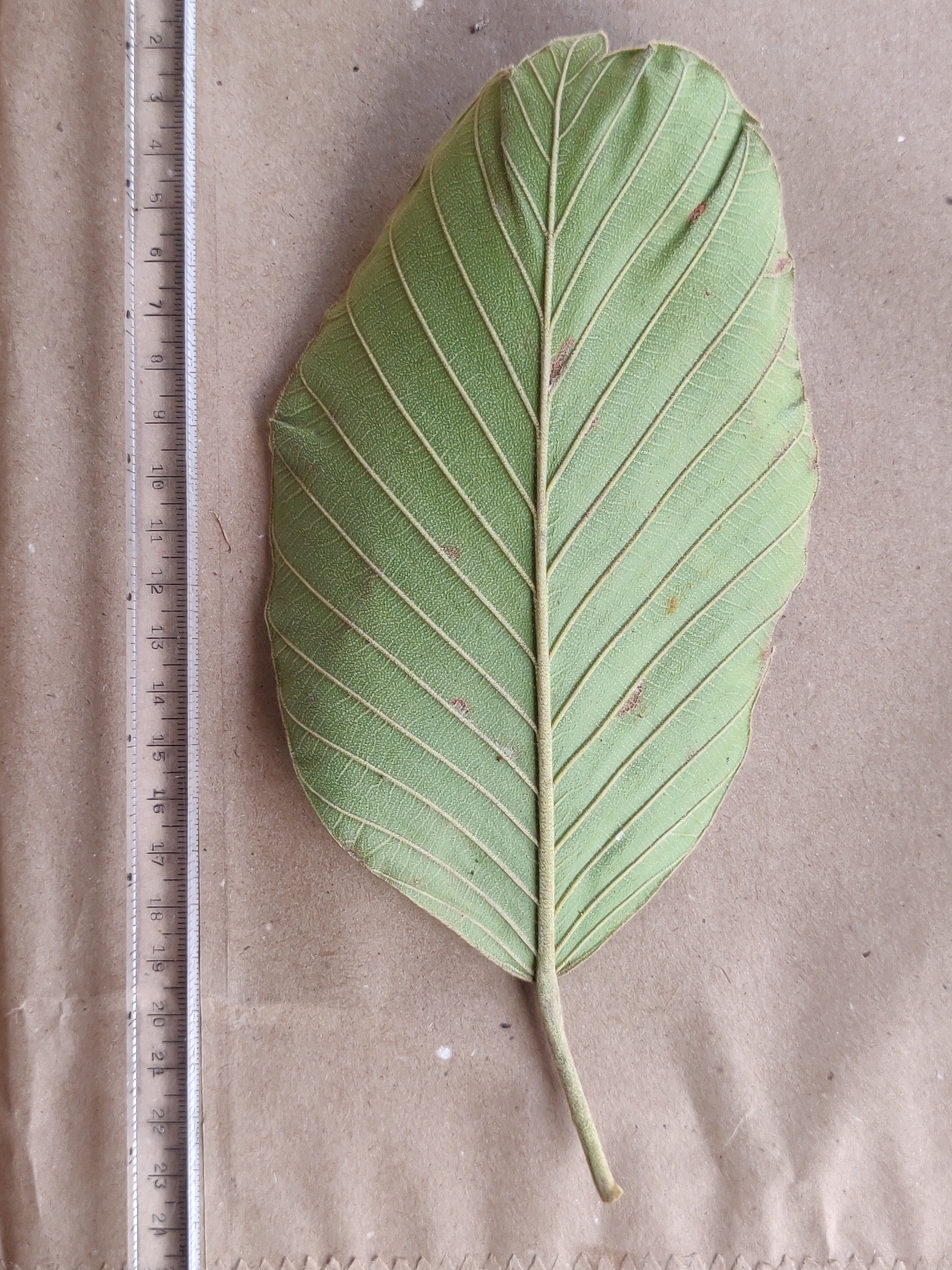
Leaf lower surface

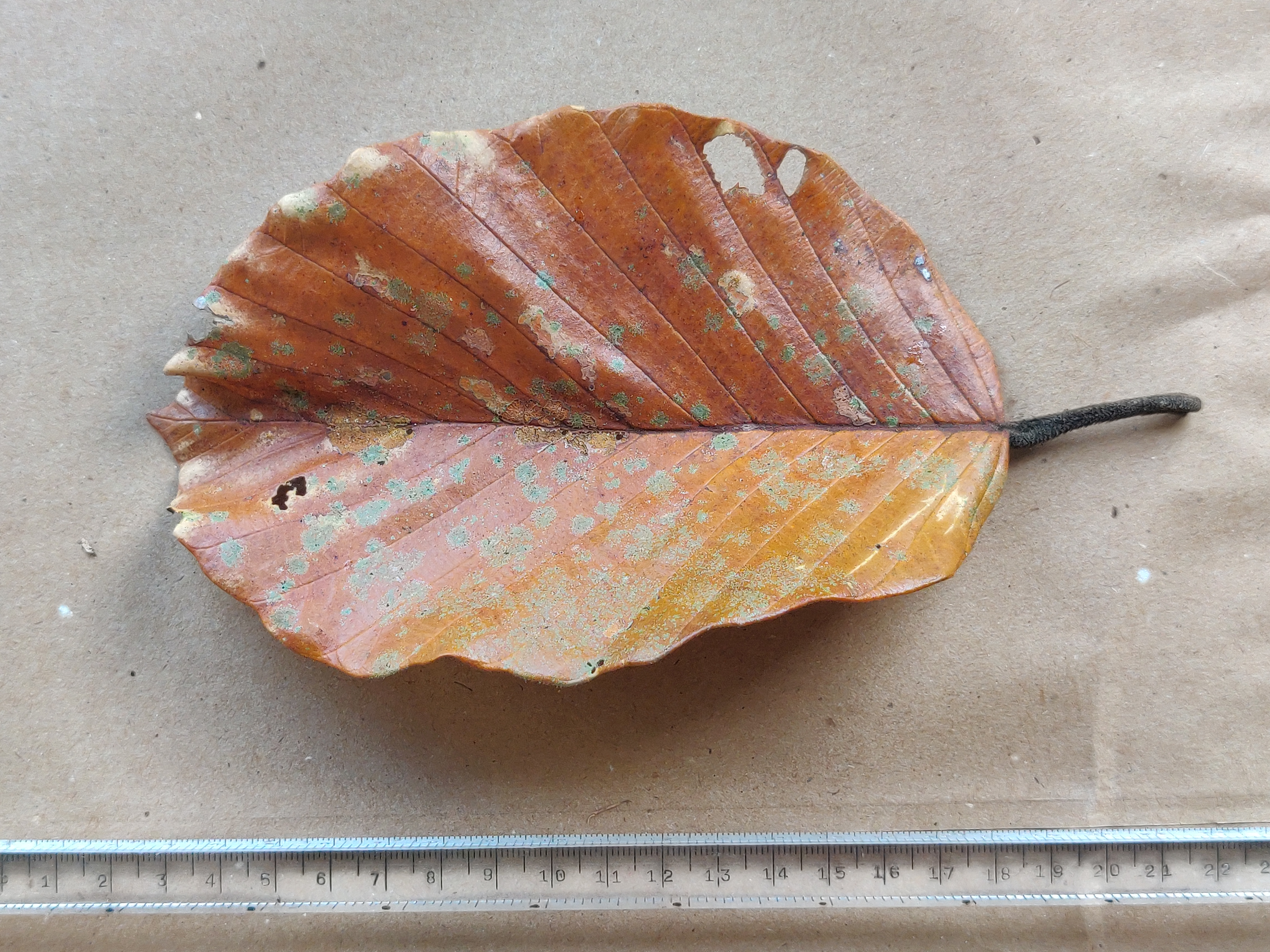
Dry leaf (upper side)

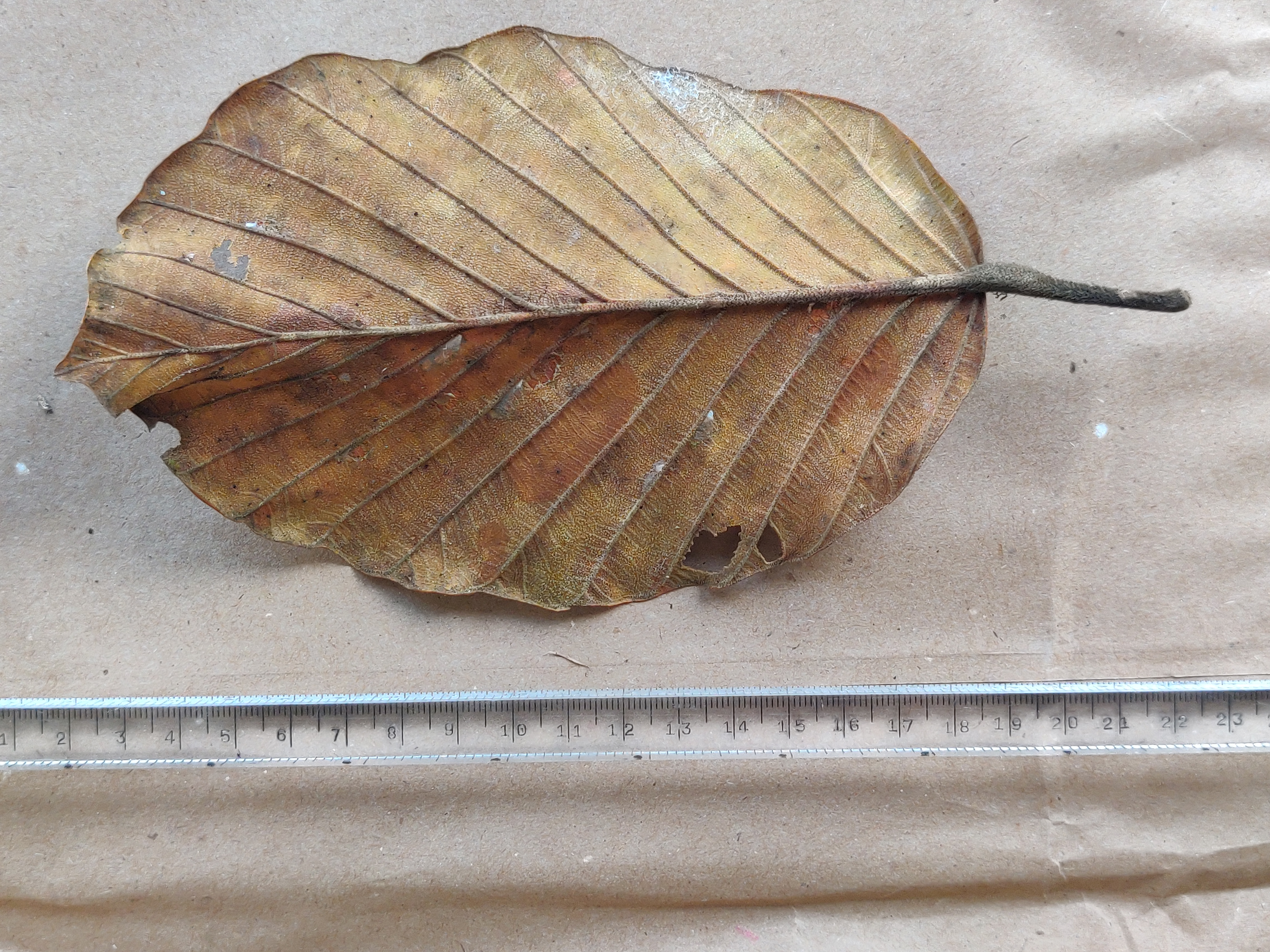
Dry leaf (underside)

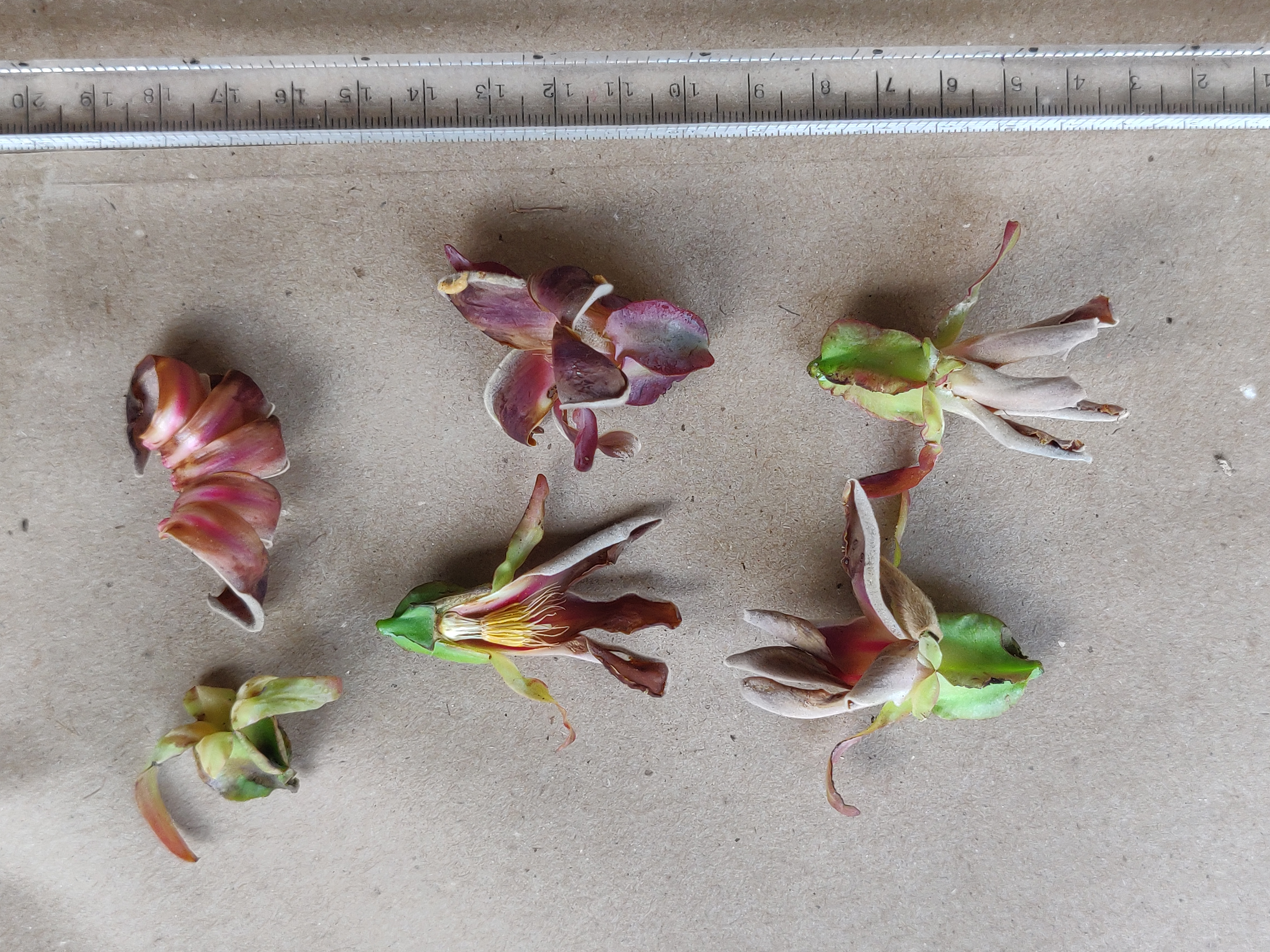
Flowers, including one cut open

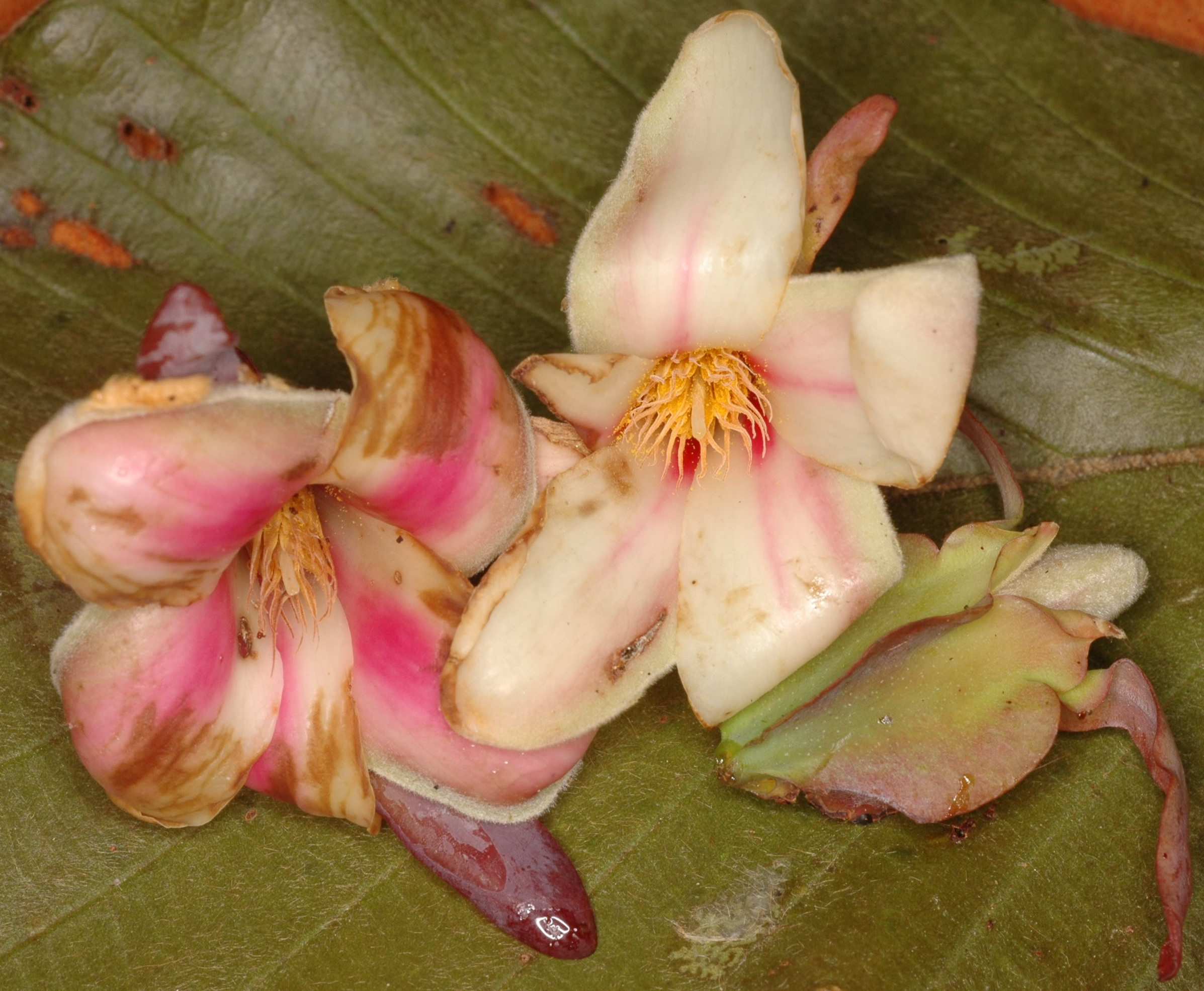
Flowers

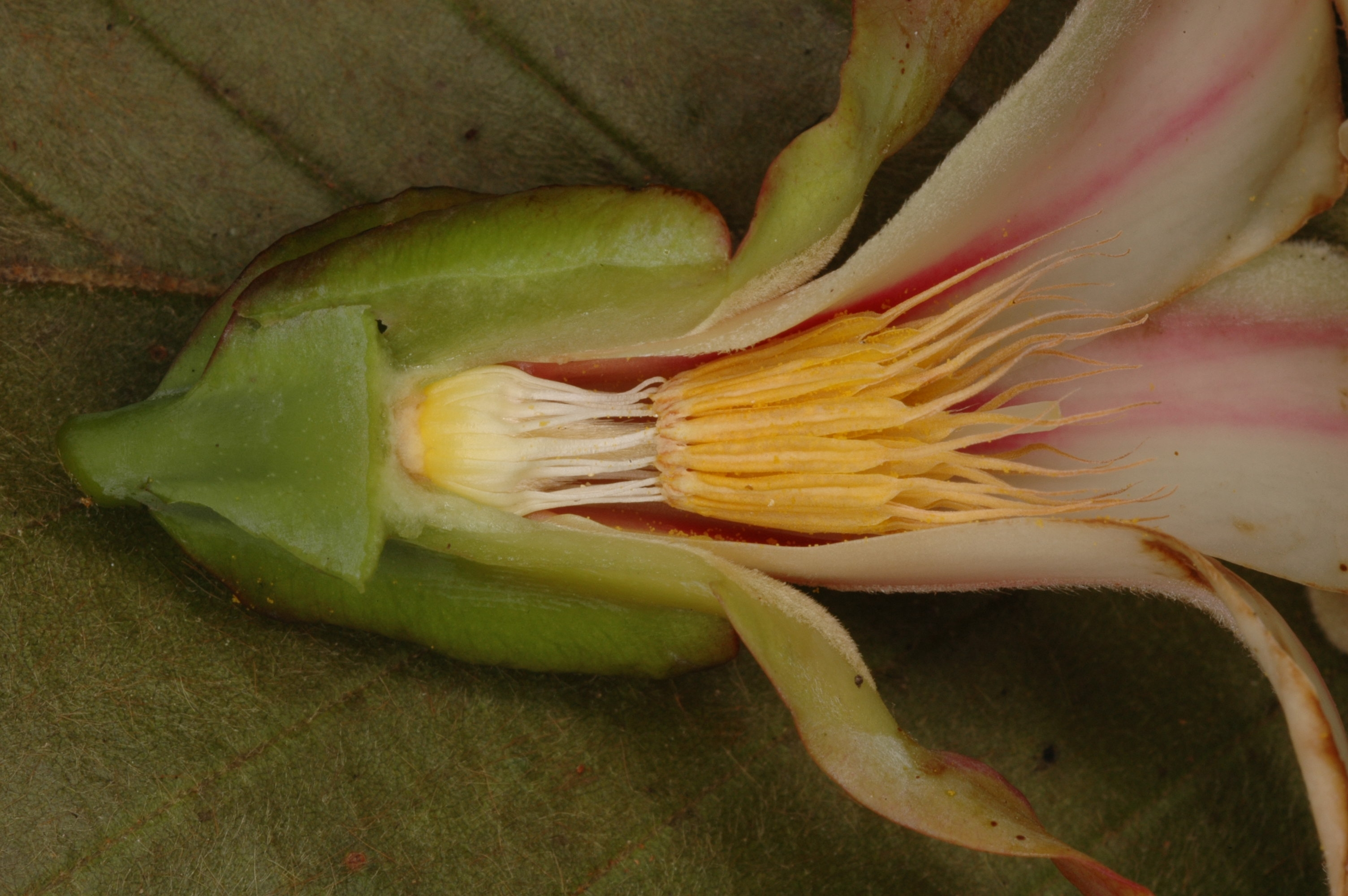
Flower in section
