= Rana marsupial =

Rana marsupial may refer to:

- Gastrotheca monticola
- Gastrotheca longipes
