= Gastrotheca lateonota =

Conservation status
- Vulnerable (IUCN 3.1)

Scientific classification
- Kingdom: Animalia
- Phylum: Chordata
- Class: Amphibia
- Order: Anura
- Family: Hemiphractidae
- Genus: Gastrotheca
- Species: G. lateonota

Binomial name
- Gastrotheca lateonota Duellman and Trueb, 1988

Species of frog

Gastrotheca lateonota (common name: El Tambo marsupial frog) is a species of frog in the family Hemiphractidae. It is known from its type locality, El Tambo near Canchaque, Cordillera de Huancabamba, at an elevation of 2,770 m (9,090 ft) asl in Peru and from the area of Chillacoche in the El Oro Province of Ecuador.

== Description ==
The adult male frog measures 54.8–61.4 mm in snout-vent length and the adult female frog 54.0–63.7 mm. The skin of the dorsum is bright green in color. There are green paravertebral marks lined with brown or dark brown. There are cream or bronze marks laterally. The flanks are brown in color with some green and brown marks. The places where the four legs meet the body and the backs of the hind legs are darker. The feet have blue color with black marks. The toes are dark bronze in color and sometimes have black marks. The belly is gray-brown in color with gray or brown marks. The iris of the eye is deep bronze in color with black reticulations. Scientists use the dark marks on the frog's head to distinguish it from Gastrotheca monticola.

== Etymology ==
Scientists gave this frog the Latin name lateonota, or "dark," because of the dark marks on the frog's head.

== Habitat ==
This arboreal frog is known from cloud forest. Scientists have seen the frog between 1,020 and 3,665 m (3,346 and 12,024 ft) above sea level.

== Reproduction ==
The female frog carries her eggs in a pouch on her back. The young emerge as tadpoles, which complete their development in water.

== Threats ==
The IUCN classifies this species as vulnerable to extinction. Principal threats include habitat loss associated with deforestation.
