= Gastrotheca lauzuricae =

Conservation status
- Data Deficient (IUCN 3.1)

Scientific classification
- Kingdom: Animalia
- Phylum: Chordata
- Class: Amphibia
- Order: Anura
- Family: Hemiphractidae
- Genus: Gastrotheca
- Species: G. coeruleomaculatus

Binomial name
- Gastrotheca coeruleomaculatus (De la Riva, 1992)

Synonyms
- Gastrotheca lauzuricae De la Riva, 1992

Species of frog

Gastrotheca lauzuricae is a species of frog in the family Hemiphractidae. It is endemic to Bolivia.

== Habitat ==
This arboreal frog is found in montane cloud forests. Scientists have seen the frog between 1,850 m (6,070 ft) and 2,800 m (9,200 ft) above sea level.

There is a protected place where the frog lives, Parque Nacional Carrasco.

== Taxonomy ==
Scientists removed this species from synonomy with Hyla splendens in 1992.

== Reproduction ==
Scientists infer the female frog carries her eggs in a bag of skin on her back, like other frogs in Gastrotheca.

== Threats ==
Scientists from the IUCN say they do not know if this frog is in danger of dying out. Human beings change the places where the frogs live to make farms and places to raise animals.

== Original posts ==
- Köhler J; C Koch; R Garlacz; M Preick; I De la Riva; M Vences (2024). "Getting back to name-bearing types: archival DNA and morphology clarify the identity of Hyla splendens Schmidt, 1857 and challenge the taxonomy of Bolivian populations of Gastrotheca (Anura: Hemiphractidae)". Salamandra. 60: 263–282.
