= Gastrotheca aratia =

Conservation status
- Least Concern (IUCN 3.1)

Scientific classification
- Kingdom: Animalia
- Phylum: Chordata
- Class: Amphibia
- Order: Anura
- Family: Hemiphractidae
- Genus: Gastrotheca
- Species: G. aratia

Binomial name
- Gastrotheca aratia Duellman, Barley, and Venegas, 2014

Synonyms
- Gastrotheca (Gastrotheca) aratia Duellman, Barley, and Venegas, 2014

Species of frog

Gastrotheca aratia is a species of frog in the family Hemiphractidae. It is found in Peru.

== Habitat ==
This frog has shown some tolerance to habitat disturbance. Scientists found it in winter cattle pasture, ploughed fields, on bushes and other plants, and in spiky bromeliads between 2,560 and 2,875 m (8,400 and 9,430 ft) above sea level. The frog has been reported in one protected park, Cutervo National Park.

== Reproduction ==
The female frog carries her eggs in a pouch on her back. The young emerge as tadpoles and complete their development in ponds.

== Threats ==
The IUCN classifies this species as least concern of extinction. It has shown some tolerance to human disturbance and can live in pastures and on farms. It can make use of human-made water sources, such as cisterns and troughs. It may face some threat from pesticides and herbicides.

== Original description ==
- Duellman WE; Barley AJ; Venegas PJ (2014). "Cryptic species diversity in marsupial frogs (Anura: Hemiphractidae: Gastrotheca) in the Andes of northern Peru". Zootaxa (Abstract). 3768: 159–177. doi:10.11646/zootaxa.3768.2.4. PMID 24871173.
