= Gastrotheca rebeccae =

Conservation status
- Endangered (IUCN 3.1)

Scientific classification
- Kingdom: Animalia
- Phylum: Chordata
- Class: Amphibia
- Order: Anura
- Family: Hemiphractidae
- Genus: Gastrotheca
- Species: G. rebeccae

Binomial name
- Gastrotheca rebeccae Duellman and Trueb, 1988

Synonyms
- Gastrotheca rebeccae Duellman and Trueb, 1988; Gastrotheca (Gastrotheca) rebeccae Duellman, 2015

Species of frog

Gastrotheca rebeccae (common name: Rebecca's marsupial frog) is a species of frog in the family Hemiphractidae. It is endemic to Peru and known from the eastern slopes of the Cordillera Oriental in the Ayacucho Region. The specific name honours Dr. Rebecca Pyles from the East Tennessee State University.

== Habitat ==
This frog lives in cloud forests on the east side of the Andes mountains. Scientists have seen the frog between 1,800 and 2,970 m (5,910 and 9,740 ft) above sea level.

== Reproduction ==
Scientists believe the female frog carries her eggs in a bag of skin on her back, but they do not know if the young emerge as tadpoles or froglets.

== Threats ==
The IUCN classifies this species as endangered. Principal threats include habitat loss from agriculture, farming, and cattle raising.
