= Williamson's marsupial frog =

Conservation status
- Data Deficient (IUCN 3.1)

Scientific classification
- Kingdom: Animalia
- Phylum: Chordata
- Class: Amphibia
- Order: Anura
- Family: Hemiphractidae
- Genus: Gastrotheca
- Species: G. williamsoni

Binomial name
- Gastrotheca williamsoni Gaige, 1922

Species of amphibian

Williamson's marsupial frog (Gastrotheca williamsoni) is a species of frog in the family Hemiphractidae. It is endemic to north-central coastal Venezuela and only known from its type locality, San Esteban in the state of Carabobo. It is a poorly known species that has not been collected since it was first described, based on a single specimen collected in 1920.

== Etymology ==
The specific name williamsoni honors E. B. Williamson, the person who collected the holotype. Williamson, an entomologist, was part of "the University of Michigan-Williamson expedition to Venezuela" that took place in 1920.

Approximate location of the type locality of Gastrotheca williamsoni, San Esteban.

== Description ==
This species was described based on a single specimen, the holotype. It is an adult female measuring 53 mm (2.1 in) in snout–vent length (SVL). The head is broader than it is long, but narrower than the body. The tympanum is visible and oval in shape. The terminal discs on the fingers are slightly larger than those on the toes. The fingers are partially webbed whereas the toes are fully webbed. Skin is slightly granular on the back but strongly granular beneath. This alcohol-preserved specimen is dorsally reddish-gray, with some darker spots and markings. the sides are light with dark vertical bars, slightly tilted forward. The throat is yellowish white while the belly and inner surfaces of the limbs are grayish yellow.

The holotype had her pouch filled with young, almost ready to emerge. One of them measured 12 mm (0.47 in) SVL.

== Habitat and conservation ==
The holotype was collected from leaf of a heliconid. The species' natural habitat is tropical montane forest. The habitat is threatened by habitat loss caused by agricultural development, logging, and infrastructure development, including cocoa plantations. The range includes San Esteban National Park.
