= Gastrotheca fissipes =

Conservation status
- Least Concern (IUCN 3.1)

Scientific classification
- Kingdom: Animalia
- Phylum: Chordata
- Class: Amphibia
- Order: Anura
- Family: Hemiphractidae
- Genus: Gastrotheca
- Species: G. fissipes

Binomial name
- Gastrotheca fissipes (Boulenger, 1888)

Synonyms
- Nototrema fissipes Boulenger, 1888

Species of amphibian

Gastrotheca fissipes (common name: Igaracu marsupial frog) is a frog species in the frog family Hemiphractidae. It is endemic to eastern Brazil and known from the coastal lowlands of Pernambuco, Alagoas, Sergipe, and Bahia.

== Habitat ==
Gastrotheca fissipes occur in primary and secondary forests and on the forest edges. They are mainly associated with terrestrial and arboreal bromeliads. Scientists have seen the frog between 0 and 700 m (0 and 2,297 ft)above sea level.

== Reproduction ==
The female frog carries her eggs in a pouch on her back. This frog is a direct developer with no free-swimming tadpole stage.

== Threats ==
Gastrotheca fissipes is a common species not considered threatened by the International Union for Conservation of Nature (IUCN). Major threats to it include habitat loss caused by agriculture, silviculture, logging, collection of bromeliads, fire, and human settlement.
