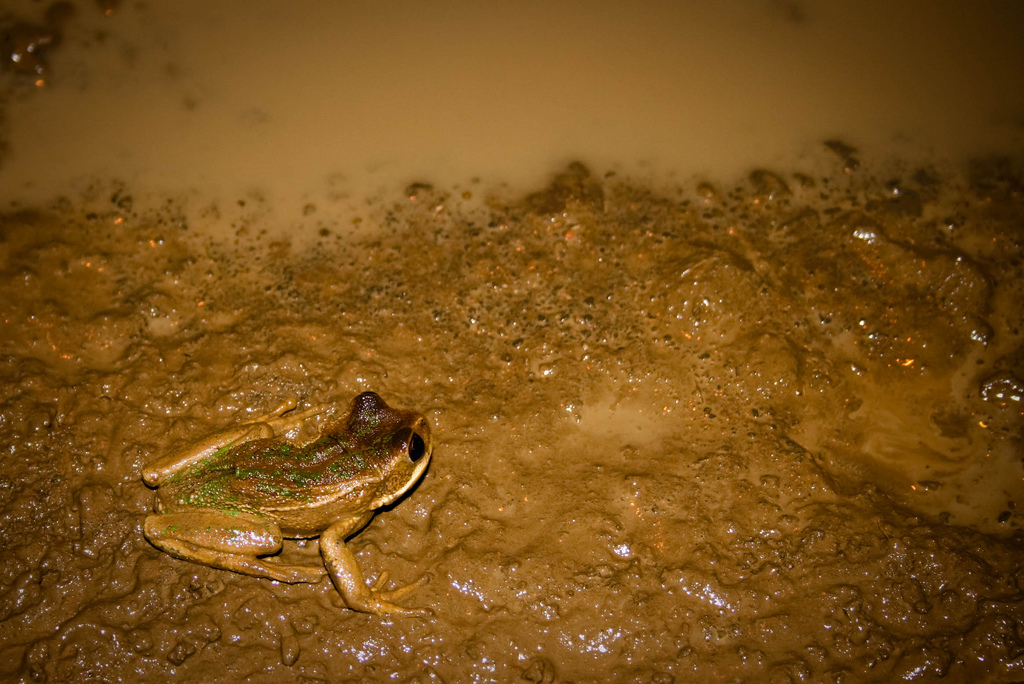

Conservation status
- Critically Endangered (IUCN 3.1)

Scientific classification
- Kingdom: Animalia
- Phylum: Chordata
- Class: Amphibia
- Order: Anura
- Family: Hemiphractidae
- Genus: Gastrotheca
- Species: G. litonedis

Binomial name
- Gastrotheca litonedis Duellman & Hillis, 1987

= Gastrotheca litonedis =

Species of frog

The Busa marsupial frog (Gastrotheca litonedis), also called the Azuay marsupial frog or rana marsupial de Busa, is a species of frog in the family Hemiphractidae. It is endemic to Ecuador.

== Description ==
The adult male frog measures about 48.9–57.4 mm in snout-vent length and the adult female frog 53.5–62.4 mm. The skin of the dorsum is either all green or all brown as a base color. Some individuals have dark brown marks on their backs. The flanks are bronze-brown in color. The axillae and inguinal areas are light blue in color. The belly is cream-gray in color. The iris of the eye is deep brown in color with brown reticulations.

== Etymology ==
Scientists named this frog litonedis for the Greek word litos for "flat" and nedys for "belly."

== Habitat ==
This nocturnal frog is semi-arboreal. It can live in forests and disturbed areas. Scientists have seen the frog between 2,750 and 2,854 m (9,022 and 9,364 ft) above sea level.

== Reproduction ==
The female frog carries her eggs in a pouch of skin on her back. She brings the tadpoles to still water. This species needs clean water to breed.

== Threats ==
The IUCN classifies this species as critically endangered. Principal threats are water pollution, largely from agrochemicals, and habitat loss associated with deforestation. near the frog's home and planted trees from other parts of the world, eucalyptus and needle trees. Predation from invasive carp and trout and excessive tourism are also factors. Scientists detected Batrachocytrium dendrobatidis on this frog and believe chytridiomycosis may have caused significant population declines before 2004, but they do not think it still kills many of these frogs.
