= Gastrotheca zeugocystis =

Conservation status
- Data Deficient (IUCN 3.1)

Scientific classification
- Kingdom: Animalia
- Phylum: Chordata
- Class: Amphibia
- Order: Anura
- Family: Hemiphractidae
- Genus: Gastrotheca
- Species: G. zeugocystis

Binomial name
- Gastrotheca zeugocystis Duellman, Lehr, Rodríguez, and von May, 2004

Species of amphibian

Gastrotheca zeugocystis is a species of frogs in the family Hemiphractidae. It is endemic to Peru and only known from its type locality on the Cordillera de Carpish, Huánuco Region. The specific name zeugocystis refers to the paired brood pouches in this species (from the Greek zeugos, meaning pair, and the Greek kystis, meaning sac).

== Description ==
The holotype, an adult female, measured 37.5 mm (1.48 in) in snout–vent length; an adult male measured 28.2 mm (1.11 in) in snout–vent length. The tympanum is visible. The dorsum and head are brown and have small, irregular markings. The dorsal skin is smooth. The iris is reddish brown and has black reticulations.

== Reproduction ==
Unlike most frogs in Gastrotheca, which have a single pouch, the female G. zeugocystis carries her eggs in two lateral pouches on either side of her body. Scientists observed one female with six eggs, 6 mm in diameter.

== Habitat and conservation ==
Gastrotheca zeugocystis inhabits cloud forest at about 2,920 m (9,580 ft) above sea level. Specimens have been found under leaves and under a piece of wood.

Gastrotheca zeugocystis is only known from two individuals. It is threatened by deforestation caused by agricultural expansion and firewood extraction. It is not known from any protected area.
