= Gastrotheca ossilaginis =

Conservation status
- Data Deficient (IUCN 3.1)

Scientific classification
- Kingdom: Animalia
- Phylum: Chordata
- Class: Amphibia
- Order: Anura
- Family: Hemiphractidae
- Genus: Gastrotheca
- Species: G. ossilaginis

Binomial name
- Gastrotheca ossilaginis Duellman & Venegas, 2005

Species of frog

Gastrotheca ossilaginis is a species of frog in the family Hemiphractidae. It is endemic to Peru.

== Habitat ==
Scientists know this species from exactly four specimens. Three were observed in Yungas forests, at night, on bushes or on bromeliad plants. The other frog was under a rock in a pasture. Scientists saw these frogs between 3,000 m (9,800 ft) and 3,100 m (10,200 ft) above sea level.

Scientists have reported the frogs in one protected place: Los Chilchos Private Conservation Area.

== Reproduction ==
The female frog carries her eggs in a brood pouch on her back. The frog undergoes direct development and the young emerge as small froglets with no free-swimming tadpole stage.

== Threats ==
The IUCN classifies this species as data deficient.

== Original description ==
- Duellman WE; Venegas P (2005). "Marsupial frogs (Anura: Hylidae: Gastrotheca) from the Andes of northern Peru with descriptions of two new species". Herpetologica. 61: 295–307.
