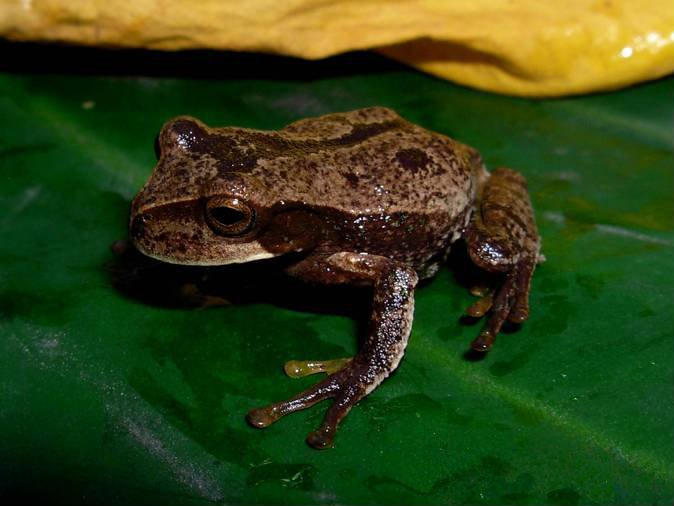

Conservation status
- Least Concern (IUCN 3.1)

Scientific classification
- Kingdom: Animalia
- Phylum: Chordata
- Class: Amphibia
- Order: Anura
- Family: Hemiphractidae
- Genus: Gastrotheca
- Species: G. argenteovirens

Binomial name
- Gastrotheca argenteovirens (Boettger, 1892)

Synonyms
- Hyla argenteovirens Boettger, 1892; Gastrotheca marsupiata argenteovirens; Gastrotheca monticola argenteovirens

= Gastrotheca argenteovirens =

Species of frog

Gastrotheca argenteovirens is a species of frog in the family Hemiphractidae. It is endemic to Colombia and occurs in the Colombian Massif, Cordillera Central, and Cordillera Occidental in the Quindío, Tolima, Valle del Cauca, Cauca, and Nariño Departments. Common name Popayan marsupial frog has been coined for it.

== Description ==
Adult males measure 42–56 mm (1.7–2.2 in) and adult females 42–65 mm (1.7–2.6 in) in snout–vent length. The head is slightly wider than it is long. The snout bluntly rounded in dorsal view and truncate (or nearly so) in profile. The tympanum is brown. The finger discs are much wider than the digits. The toes are about half-webbed. The dorsum is tan or green. It is uniform or with dark brown longitudinal paravertebral markings and/or dark flecks. The flanks are brown or green, turning blue with black spots in the groin. The ventrum is creamy gray, usually with black flecks.

== Habitat and conservation ==
Gastrotheca argenteovirens occurs in Andean forests and sub-paramos at elevations of 1,650–3,300 m (5,410–10,830 ft) above sea level. It occurs both inside the forest and next to streams, and can also occur in open areas, pastures, and human disturbed areas. The female broods the eggs in her back and carries the tadpoles to small pools for further development.

Gastrotheca argenteovirens is a very common and adaptable species. It is not facing any major threats.
