= Gastrotheca galeata =

Conservation status
- Data Deficient (IUCN 3.1)

Scientific classification
- Kingdom: Animalia
- Phylum: Chordata
- Class: Amphibia
- Order: Anura
- Family: Hemiphractidae
- Genus: Gastrotheca
- Species: G. galeata

Binomial name
- Gastrotheca galeata Trueb & Duellman, 1978

Species of frog

Gastrotheca galeata is a species of frog in the family Hemiphractidae.

== Description ==
This frog has coossified head and limbs and almost no webbed skin on the feet, so scientists think the frog might fossorial.

== Habitat ==
This frog lives in cloud forests, dry forests, pasture, and disturbed habitats. During the day, people see the frogs in cracks in rotted logs, in the ground, and under rocks. At night, they see it on branches. Scientists have seen the frog between 1,740 and 2,130 m (5,710 and 6,990 ft) above sea level.

== Reproduction ==
The female frog carries her eggs in a pouch on her back. The young emerge as small froglets, not tadpoles.

== Threats ==
The IUCN classifies this species as data deficient. They suspect regional agriculture may affect the frog.
