= Gastrotheca chrysosticta =

Conservation status
- Endangered (IUCN 3.1)

Scientific classification
- Kingdom: Animalia
- Phylum: Chordata
- Class: Amphibia
- Order: Anura
- Family: Hemiphractidae
- Genus: Gastrotheca
- Species: G. chrysosticta

Binomial name
- Gastrotheca chrysosticta Laurent, 1976

Species of frog

Gastrotheca chrysosticta is a species of frog in the family Hemiphractidae. It is found in Argentina and Bolivia.

== Home ==
This arboreal frog lives in trees crowns, holes in trees, and bromeliad plants on said trees in Yungas forests in the Andes. Scientists have seen the frog between 600 and 2,500 m (2,000 and 8,200 ft) above sea level.

Scientists have seen this frog a protected place: Baritú National Park.

== Reproduction ==
The female frog carries her eggs in a pouch on her back. The male moves the eggs to the pouch during amplexus. The female brings the tadpoles to pools of water on the forest floor, where the tadpoles develop further.

== Threats ==
The IUCN classifies this species as endangered. There is some encroachment of cattle into Baritú National Park. Outside the park, the principal threat is habitat loss associated with selective logging of valuable wood, cattle cultivation, and transportation projects.
