= Gastrotheca prasina =

Conservation status
- Data Deficient (IUCN 3.1)

Scientific classification
- Kingdom: Animalia
- Phylum: Chordata
- Class: Amphibia
- Order: Anura
- Family: Hemiphractidae
- Genus: Gastrotheca
- Species: G. prasina

Binomial name
- Gastrotheca prasina Teixeira, Vechio, Recoder, Carnaval, Strangas, Damasceno, Sena, and Rodrigues, 2012

Synonyms
- Gastrotheca (Gastrotheca) prasina Teixeira, Vechio, Recoder, Carnaval, Strangas, Damasceno, Sena, and Rodrigues, 2012; Eotheca prasina (Teixeira, Vechio, Recoder, Carnaval, Strangas, Damasceno, Sena, and Rodrigues, 2012)

Species of frog

Gastrotheca prasina is a frog in the family Hemiphractidae. It is endemic to Brazil.

== Description ==
The adult male frog measures 79.3–89.6 mm in snout-vent length and the adult female frog 97.2 mm. The skin of the dorsum is orange-green in color and there is a dark brown line under the eyes. There is orange pigmentation on the head and face. The flanks are green and brown with some yellow spots and black near the rear end. The dorsal surfaces of the hind legs are orange-green with green bars against some white and black. The forelegs have green bars. The dorsal surfaces of all four feet have orange color. The throat, chest, and ventral surfaces of the legs are dark gray with some lighter marks. The belly is light gray in color with some dark marks.

== Etymology ==
Scientists named this frog prasina for the Latin prasinus, meaning "green."

== Reproduction ==
The female frog carries her eggs in a pouch on her back. The young emerge as small froglets.

== Habitat ==
The type locality is 989 m (3,245 ft) above sea level within the Reserva Biológica da Mata Escura. This park covers an area where the humid Atlantic Forest biome transitions to dry Cerrado. The frog lives in patches of grassland where water-bearing bromeliad plants grow.

== Threats ==
The IUCN classifies this species as data deficient. The frogs within the Reserva are not subject to harmful human interference. Elsewhere, human beings convert forests and natural grassland to farms and livestock grazing areas.
