= Gastrotheca pacchamama =

Conservation status
- Endangered (IUCN 3.1)

Scientific classification
- Kingdom: Animalia
- Phylum: Chordata
- Class: Amphibia
- Order: Anura
- Family: Hemiphractidae
- Genus: Gastrotheca
- Species: G. pacchamama

Binomial name
- Gastrotheca pacchamama Duellman, 1987

Species of frog

Gastrotheca pacchamama is a species of frog in the family Hemiphractidae. It is endemic to Peru and only known from the Ayacucho Region in the Cordillera Oriental.

== Etymology ==
The specific name refers to Pachamama, a goddess of the indigenous people of the Andes. It is derived from Quechuan paccha for "earth" and mama for "mother" and was chosen because some of the types were found under stones where travelers placed food, so as to ensure that Pachamama would grant them a safe journey. The common name Ayacucho marsupial frog has been coined for it.

== Description ==
Males grow to a maximum size of 37.5 mm (1.5 in) and females to 38.0 mm (1.5 in) in snout–vent length. The head is slightly wider than it is long. The snout is acutely rounded in dorsal view and rounded in profile. The tympanum is dark brown, red, green, or gray, covered by the supra-tympanic fold in its upper part. The fingers have no webbing and bear small discs, only slightly wider than the digits. The first three toes lack webbing whereas the remaining toes are basally webbed. The toe discs that are smaller than the finger discs. The dorsum is tan, red, gray, or green, and the majority of individuals have a darker inter-orbital bar. Many have para-vertebral longitudinal marks, and may also have further mid-dorsal marks or flecks/spots. The flanks are uniform pale gray. The ventrum is pale creamy tan, often with dark flecks.

== Habitat and conservation ==
Gastrotheca pacchamama is a terrestrial species occurring in puna grasslands at an elevation of about 3,710 m (12,170 ft) asl. The type series was found under rocks. Some males were calling during the day from moss-covered talus.

The female carries her eggs in a pouch on her back. Scientists infer that the young emerge as small froglets with no free-swimming tadpole stage, but this has yet to be confirmed.

Gastrotheca pacchamama is a poorly known species occurring in an isolated area. Threats to it are unknown but are believed to be insignificant, considering its known range. It is not known from any protected areas.
