= Gastrotheca ochoai =

Conservation status
- Endangered (IUCN 3.1)

Scientific classification
- Kingdom: Animalia
- Phylum: Chordata
- Class: Amphibia
- Order: Anura
- Family: Hemiphractidae
- Genus: Gastrotheca
- Species: G. ochoai

Binomial name
- Gastrotheca ochoai Duellman and Fritts, 1972

Species of frog

Gastrotheca ochoai is a species of frog in the family Hemiphractidae. It is endemic to southern Peru and occurs in the interandean valleys on the eastern face of the Andes. The specific name ochoai honors Oscar Ochoa Mendieta, a biology professor from the National University of Saint Anthony the Abbot in Cuzco who helped the species descriptors during the field work. Common name Chilca marsupial frog has been coined for this species.

== Description ==
Adult males measure 26–33 mm (1.0–1.3 in) and adult females 31–39 mm (1.2–1.5 in) in snout–vent length. The snout is pointed in dorsal view and round in profile. The tympanum is round; the supra-tympanic fold is weakly developed and granular. The fingers have no webbing whereas the toes have moderate webbing; the discs are wide and roundly truncate. Dorsal skin has small tubercles. Adults have golden tan coloration with black or brown markings, potentially joining into median or paired stripes. They can, however, change their color to brown, as well as change the intensity of the dorsal patterns. There are narrow, dark brown canthal and post-orbital stripes. The iris is bronze. The venter is dusky white.

The tadpoles metamorphose in their mother's pouch.

== Habitat and conservation ==
Gastrotheca ochoai lives at elevations of 2,745–3,080 m (9,006–10,105 ft) above sea level. It has been found solely in bromeliad plants growing on cliffs. It is a very rare species that is threatened by habitat loss (deforestation) in favor of farms and livestock cultivation. While scientists have not reported this frog in any protected places, they suspect it in Machu Picchu Historic Sanctuary. Because the frog lives near important archeological sites, it may be disturbed by visitors.

The IUCN classifies this frog as endangered and Peru's own system rates it as critically endangered.
