= Gastrotheca atympana =

Conservation status
- Vulnerable (IUCN 3.1)

Scientific classification
- Kingdom: Animalia
- Phylum: Chordata
- Class: Amphibia
- Order: Anura
- Family: Hemiphractidae
- Genus: Gastrotheca
- Species: G. atympana

Binomial name
- Gastrotheca atympana Duellman, Lehr, Rodríguez, and von May, 2004

Species of frog

Gastrotheca atympana is a species of frog in the family Hemiphractidae. It is endemic to Peru and only known from its type locality in the Pampa Hermosa National Sanctuary, Junín Region. It lacks an external tympanum, hence the specific name atympana.

== Description ==
The holotype, an adult male, measured 47 mm (1.9 in) in snout–vent length. External tympanum is lacking. The dorsum and flanks are pale gray. There are orange-brown markings with narrow, dark brown edges. The dorsal skin is finely shagreen. The iris is pale yellowish tan above and pale gray below and has black reticulations.

== Habitat and conservation ==
Gastrotheca atympana inhabits humid montane primary forest at about 1,540 m (5,050 ft) above sea level. It has been collected in dense forest on tree branches some 1.2 meters above the ground.

Gastrotheca atympana is only known from two individuals collected in 2003 and 2004, despite regular searches. Outside the Pampa Hermosa National Sanctuary, potential threats to this species are illegal logging, slash and burn agriculture, mining activities and road construction. There is a risk of these activities to encroach the reserve.
