= Gastrotheca yacuri =

Conservation status
- Endangered (IUCN 3.1)

Scientific classification
- Kingdom: Animalia
- Phylum: Chordata
- Class: Amphibia
- Order: Anura
- Family: Hemiphractidae
- Genus: Gastrotheca
- Species: G. yacuri

Binomial name
- Gastrotheca yacuri Carvajal-Endara, Coloma, Morales-Mite, Guayasamin, Székely, and Duellman, 2019

Species of frog

Gastrotheca yacuri, the Yacuri marsupial frog, is a species of frog in the family Hemiphractidae. It is found in Ecuador.

== Description ==
This frog can measure 57.4–58.9 mm in snout-vent length. The skin of the frog's head and back is green in color. There is some blue and black coloration in some areas. The labial and canthal stripes are dark brown in color. There are thin, whitish paravertebral lines bordered in black or dark brown. The flanks are dark brown and green in color with a blue and black pattern near where the four legs meet the body. The belly is cream in color with small dark brown marks. The skin of the throat sac is gray-brown in color with darker marks. The palmar surfaces of the feet are gray-pink in color. Some of the ends of the toes are red in color. The iris of the eye is copper in color black reticulations.

== Etymology ==
Scientists named this frog for Parque Nacional Yacuri.

== Habitat ==
This nocturnal, semi-arboreal frog is found in paramo and sub-paramo in the Evergreen Montane Forest in Catamayo-Alamor. Scientists have seen these frogs on branches and in bromeliad plants. They saw the frog between 2,712 m (8,898 ft) and 3,492 m (11,457 ft) above sea level.

Scientists have reported this frog in a single protected place, Parque Nacional Yacuri.

== Reproduction ==
Scientists believe this frog may breed through direct development. No tadpoles have been reported.

== Threats ==
The IUCN classifies this frog as endangered. Threats include habitat loss in favor of agriculture and livestock cultivation, pesticides, fires, overtourism, and introduced species.
