= Gastrotheca elicioi =

Scientific classification
- Kingdom: Animalia
- Phylum: Chordata
- Class: Amphibia
- Order: Anura
- Family: Hemiphractidae
- Genus: Gastrotheca
- Species: G. elicioi

Binomial name
- Gastrotheca elicioi Carvajal-Endara, Coloma, Morales-Mite, Guayasamin, Székely, and Duellman, 2019

Species of frog

Gastrotheca elicioi, or Elicio's marsupial frog, is a species of frog in the family Hemiphractidae. It is found in Ecuador and Peru.

== Description ==
The adult male frog measures 46.4–67.8 mm in snout-vent length and the adult female frog 67.5 mm. The skin of the dorsum is dark brown in color and the flanks are bronze-brown in color with some yellow. The upper surfaces of the legs have some olive green. There is a bronze line from the mouth to where the forelegs meet the body. There is a broken line down each side of the body. Some parts of the body are pale green in color with black or white spots. The belly is brown-gray in color with black or white marks. The throat is dark gray in color. The iris of the eye is copper in color with black reticulations.

== Etymology ==
Scientists named this frog for Elicio E. Tapia, an Ecuadorean biologist who helped build the collections of many museums in Ecuador.

== Habitat ==
Scientists saw the frog in forest fragments between 2,010 m (6,590 ft) and 2,914 m (9,560 ft) above sea level in Ecuador's Loja Province. Scientists first saw the frog near the entrance to Parque Nacional Podocarpus.

== Reproduction ==
The female frog carries her eggs in a pouch on her back. The young emerge as tadpoles.
