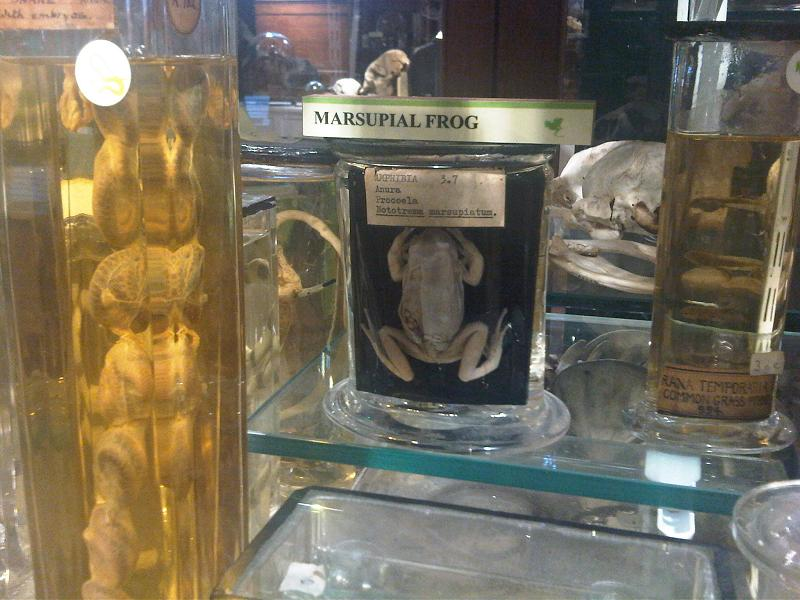
- Gastrotheca griswoldi

Conservation status
- Least Concern (IUCN 3.1)

Scientific classification
- Kingdom: Animalia
- Phylum: Chordata
- Class: Amphibia
- Order: Anura
- Family: Hemiphractidae
- Genus: Gastrotheca
- Species: G. griswoldi

Binomial name
- Gastrotheca griswoldi Shreve, 1941

Synonyms
- Gastrotheca boliviana griswoldi Shreve, 1941; Gastrotheca marsupiata bifasciata Vellard, 1957; Gastrotheca (Opisthodelphys) griswoldi — Dubois, 1987; Gastrotheca (Gastrotheca) griswoldi — Duellman, 2015

= Gastrotheca griswoldi =

Species of frog

Gastrotheca griswoldi is a species of frog in the family Hemiphractidae. The species is endemic to central Peru.

== Geographic range ==
G. griswoldi is known from the Huánuco, Junín, and Pasco Regions of Peru.

== Etymology ==
The specific name, griswoldi, honours John Augustus Griswold Jr (1912–1991), an American aviculturist and ornithologist.

The common name Griswold's marsupial frog, has been coined for G. griswoldi.

== Habitat ==
The natural habitats of G. griswoldi are dry puna grasslands, including traditionally cultivated arable land, at elevations of 3,000–4,020 m (9,840–13,190 ft) asl.

Scientists have reported the frog in a protected park: Pui Pui Protection Forest.

== Conservation status ==
G. griswoldi is a relatively abundant species that does not appear to face major threats.
