= Gastrotheca abdita =

Conservation status
- Data Deficient (IUCN 3.1)

Scientific classification
- Kingdom: Animalia
- Phylum: Chordata
- Class: Amphibia
- Order: Anura
- Family: Hemiphractidae
- Genus: Gastrotheca
- Species: G. abdita

Binomial name
- Gastrotheca abdita Duellman, 1987

Species of frog

Gastrotheca abdita is a species of frog in the family Hemiphractidae. It is endemic to Peru and only known from the Cordillera Colán in the Amazonas Region. The specific name abdita is Latin for "exiled" or "removed" and refers to the geographic isolation of the Cordillera Colán. Common name Cordillera Colan marsupial frog has been coined for it.

== Description ==
Males grow to a maximum size of 35 mm (1.4 in) and females to 46.2 mm (1.8 in) in snout–vent length. The head is slightly wider than it is long. The snout is acuminate in dorsal view and bluntly rounded in profile. The tympanum is brown and distinct, covered by the supra-tympanic fold in its upper part. The fingers have no webbing but bear discs that are much wider than the digits. The toes are about one-fourth webbed and bear discs that are slightly smaller than the finger discs. The dorsum is in most individuals uniform brown, but some have a paler mid-dorsal mark. Skin is smooth dorsally and granular on flanks, belly, and proximal postero-ventral surfaces of the thighs.

== Reproduction ==
The female frog carries her eggs in a U-shaped pouch on her back. The young emerge as froglets with no free-swimming tadpole stage.

== Habitat and conservation ==
Gastrotheca abdita is a terrestrial species occurring in grassy areas, bogs, and the fronds of terrestrial bromeliads at elevations of 2,970–3,330 m (9,740–10,930 ft) asl, above the treeline. No major threats to this little-studied species are known. It is suspected in the Cordillera de Colán National Sanctuary.
