= Walker's marsupial frog =

Conservation status
- Vulnerable (IUCN 3.1)

Scientific classification
- Kingdom: Animalia
- Phylum: Chordata
- Class: Amphibia
- Order: Anura
- Family: Hemiphractidae
- Genus: Gastrotheca
- Species: G. walkeri

Binomial name
- Gastrotheca walkeri Duellman, 1980

Synonyms
- Gastrotheca walkeri Trueb and Duellman, 1978; Gastrotheca (Opisthodelphys) walkeri Dubois, 1987 "1986"; Gastrotheca (Cryptotheca) walkeri Duellman, 2015; Cryptotheca walkeri Dubois, Ohler, and Pyron, 2021

Species of amphibian

Walker's marsupial frog (Gastrotheca walkeri) is a species of frog in the family Hemiphractidae. It is endemic to Venezuela.

== Habitat ==
People see this frog on bushes, trees, and palm fronds, about 1 to 2 m (3 ft 3 in to 6 ft 7 in) above the ground in submontane moist forests and cloud forests. People hear the male frogs call frogs from bromeliad plants. This frog is sympatric with G. ovifera and Flectonotus pygmaeus. Scientists have seen the frog between 650 and 1,200 m (2,130 and 3,940 ft) above sea level.

The frog's known range overlaps two protected parks: Henri Pittier National Park and Yurubí National Park.

== Reproduction ==
The female frog carries her eggs on her back. This frog breeds through direct development with no free-swimming tadpole stage.

== Threats ==
The IUCN classifies this species as vulnerable to extinction. The principal threats are habitat loss and deforestation in favor of urbanization, agriculture, and swine farming. The frog is also in danger from pollution. Scientists have detected the fungus Batrachochytrium dendrobatidis in the area. Many other frogs in the area have suffered from chytridiomycosis.
