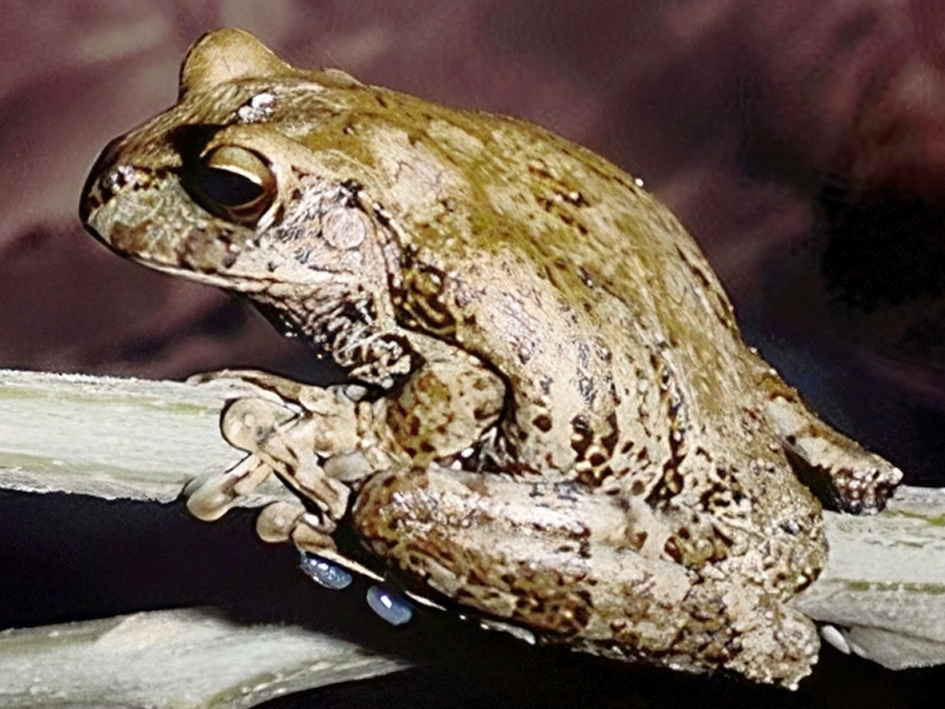

Conservation status
- Least Concern (IUCN 3.1)

Scientific classification
- Kingdom: Animalia
- Phylum: Chordata
- Class: Amphibia
- Order: Anura
- Family: Hemiphractidae
- Genus: Gastrotheca
- Species: G. fulvorufa

Binomial name
- Gastrotheca fulvorufa (Andersson, 1911)

Synonyms
- Nototrema fulvorufa Andersson, 1911; Gastrotheca fulvorufa Miranda-Ribeiro, 1926; Hyla Parkeri De Witte, 1930; Hyla parkeriana De Witte, 1930; Gastrotheca fulvorufa Caramaschi and Rodrigues, 2007; Gastrotheca (Australotheca) fulvorufa Duellman, 2015; Gastrotheca (Alainia) fulvorufa Duellman and Cannatella, 2018; Alainia fulvorufa Dubois, Ohler, and Pyron, 2021

= Gastrotheca fulvorufa =

Species of frog

Gastrotheca fulvorufa is a species of frog in the family Hemiphractidae. It is endemic to Brazil.

== Habitat ==
This arboreal, canopy-dwelling frog lives in Atlantic rainforest in Brazil. Scientists have reported the frog between 0 and 800 m (0 and 2,625 ft) above sea level.

The frog's range overlaps with several protected areas: Reserva Biologica Alto da Serra de Paranapiacaba, Parque Estadual da Serra do Mar, and Parque Nacional da Serra dos Órgãos.

== Reproduction ==
Scientists believe this frog reproduces in the same manner as other species in Gastrotheca: The female frog carries her eggs in a pouch on her back. The eggs hatch into small froglets with no free-swimming tadpole phase. The froglets live in or near bromeliad plants.

== Threats ==
The IUCN classifies this species as least concern of extinction. What threat it faces comes from habitat loss and habitat fragmentation in favor of agriculture, silviculture, livestock cultivation, and human habitation. During the previous century, the Atlantic forest was subject ot extensive logging as well, but this has largely ceased.

== Original description ==
- Caramaschi U; Rodrigues MT (2007). "Taxonomic status of the species of Gastrotheca Fitzinger 1847 (Amphibia, Anura, Amphignathodontidae) of the Atlantic rainforest of eastern Brazil, with description of a new species". Boletim do Museu Nacional Rio de Janeiro. 52: 1–19.
