= Niceforo's marsupial frog =

Conservation status
- Least Concern (IUCN 3.1)

Scientific classification
- Kingdom: Animalia
- Phylum: Chordata
- Class: Amphibia
- Order: Anura
- Family: Hemiphractidae
- Genus: Gastrotheca
- Species: G. nicefori

Binomial name
- Gastrotheca nicefori Gaige, 1933

Synonyms
- Gastrotheca medemi Cochran and Goin, 1970; Gastrotheca yacambuensis Yústiz, 1976

Species of amphibian

Gastrotheca nicefori (common name: Niceforo's marsupial frog) is a species of frog in the family Hemiphractidae. It is found in the Andes of Colombia (the three cordilleras: Cordillera Occidental, Cordillera Central, and Cordillera Oriental), on the Andean slopes of northern Venezuela, and in the highlands of eastern and central Panama.

== Etymology ==
The specific name nicefori honors Brother Nicéforo María, a priest and naturalist of French origin.

== Description ==
Adult males grow to 73 mm (2.9 in) and females to 82 mm (3.2 in) in snout–vent length. The dorsum is light brown, with the sides being darker than the upper surface. Its coloration may get lighter during the day. The ventrum is light grey or greyish brown. The finger and toe discs are relatively large. The fingers and toes and lightly webbed.

The male advertisement call consists of a number of chicken-like "clucks." The female carries the eggs in a pouch on her back. The development is direct with no free-swimming tadpole stage. Females can brood 26-50 young at a time.

== Habitat and conservation ==
This nocturnal frog lives in lowland forests and montane cloud forests at elevations of 400–2,400 m (1,300–7,900 ft) above sea level. It can also survive in disturbed cloud forest. It is an arboreal species living in forest canopy.

It is an abundant species that can be locally threatened by pollution from the spraying of illegal crops. It occurs in several protected areas through its range: Scientists have seen the frog in protected places: Sierra Nevada National Park in Venezuela, El Tamá National Park in Colombia and Venezuela, and Reserva Forestal Fortuna and Parque Nacional Darién in Panama.
