= Gastrotheca testudinea =

Conservation status
- Least Concern (IUCN 3.1)

Scientific classification
- Kingdom: Animalia
- Phylum: Chordata
- Class: Amphibia
- Order: Anura
- Family: Hemiphractidae
- Genus: Gastrotheca
- Species: G. testudinea

Binomial name
- Gastrotheca testudinea (Jiménez de la Espada, 1870)

Synonyms
- Nototrema testudineum Jiménez de la Espada, 1870; Nototrema viviparum Andersson, 1945; Gastrotheca viviparum (Andersson, 1945)

Species of frog

Gastrotheca testudinea (common name: Espada's marsupial frog) is a species of frog in the family Hemiphractidae. It has a widespread latitudinal range along the eastern (Amazonian) slopes of the Andes of Ecuador, Peru, and Bolivia.

== Description ==
The adult male frog measures 49.8–61.1 mm in snout-vent length and the adult female frog 56.8–82.6 mm. Individuals can vary considerably in color. Scientists have seen frogs with brown backs with green and dark brown marks and light-colored chests and bellies, frogs with uniformly green backs and orange or bronze bellies and bronze eyes with brown-pink reticulations. One juvenile had an olive-brown back, red spots, green color under its eyes, a light gray belly, and bronze eyes with reticulations.

== Habitat ==
This arboreal marsupial frog, G. testudinea, dwells in foothill, low montane, and cloud forests at elevations from 700–2,775 m (2,297–9,104 ft) above sea level. Despite its wide distribution, Gastrotheca testudinea is seldom collected or recorded, probably due to its arboreal habits, and much remains to be known about its distribution and natural history. Habitat loss is a threat to it.

Scientists have reported the frogs in some protected places: Pilon Lajas National Park, Carrasco National Park, Parque Nacional y Área Natural de Manejo Integrado Cotapata, and Parque Nacional del Manu. The frog's range also overlaps with other protected places in which it has not been specifically reported: Parque Nacional Sumaco Napo-Galeras, Reserva Ecológica Antisana, Reserva Biológa San Francisco, Parque Nacional Llanganates, Parque Nacional Sangay.

== Reproduction ==
The female frog carries her eggs in a pouch on her back. Scientists have seen individual females carrying 30-69 eggs at a time. This frog is a direct developer with no free-swimming tadpole stage.

== Conservation and threats ==
Ecuador classifies the frog as near threatened and the IUCN classifies the species as least concern. In some places, the frog is threatened by habitat loss in favor of agriculture, livestock cultivation, and logging. The fungual disease chytridiomycosis may also pose some threat.

The Museum of Zoology of the Pontificia Universidad Católica del Ecuador has a program to maintain these frogs.
