= Gastrotheca trachyceps =

Conservation status
- Endangered (IUCN 3.1)

Scientific classification
- Kingdom: Animalia
- Phylum: Chordata
- Class: Amphibia
- Order: Anura
- Family: Hemiphractidae
- Genus: Gastrotheca
- Species: G. trachyceps

Binomial name
- Gastrotheca trachyceps Duellman, 1987

Species of frog

Gastrotheca trachyceps is a species of frog in the family Hemiphractidae. It is endemic to the Cauca Department, Colombia, and is known from its type locality, Cerro Munchique in the Cordillera Occidental, and Vereda Santa Elena (Popayán) in the Cordillera Central. The specific name trachyceps is said to be derived from Greek trachy meaning "rough" and Latin ceps meaning "head", in reference to the rough appearance of the head. The proper word in Latin for head, however, is caput. The common name Cerro Munchique marsupial frog has been coined for it.

== Description ==
Adult males measure about 50 mm (2.0 in) (based on the sole male in the type series) and adult females 40–68 mm (1.6–2.7 in) in snout–vent length. The head is slightly wider than it is long. The snout is bluntly rounded in dorsal view and truncate in profile. The tympanum is brown. The finger discs are much wider than the digits; the toe discs are noticeably smaller than those on the fingers. The fingers have no webbing whereas the toes are about one-third webbed. The dorsum is green or brown, typically with dark brown longitudinal paravertebral markings and/or dark flecks. A pale dorsolateral stripe is present, and a pale supra-cloacal stripe is often present. The flanks are brown or green, and the groin is blue with black spots. The ventrum is pale creamy gray with dark flecks.

== Habitat and conservation ==
Gastrotheca trachyceps occurs on vegetation and next to streams inside forest and at the forest edge 2,170–2,768 m (7,119–9,081 ft) above sea level. It uses bromeliads as refuge and can also occur in paramos as long as there are bromeliads; it has also been recorded in a pasture next to a stream. The female broods the eggs in her pouch until they hatch. The young emerge as froglets, with no free-swimming tadpole stage.

This species is only known from two localities. It was reported as relatively common at the type locality, but recent surveys have failed to locate it. Even though the type locality is entirely within the Munchique National Park, cultivation of illegal crops is causing habitat loss; spraying these crops with glyphosate may have impacted this species. The second population in Vereda Santa Elena was discovered in 2005, but an intensive survey in 2016 recovered only one individual. In this locality, Gastrotheca trachyceps is threatened by the establishment of eucalyptus plantations and the use of pesticides on these plantations.
