= Gastrotheca pachachacae =

Conservation status
- Vulnerable (IUCN 3.1)

Scientific classification
- Kingdom: Animalia
- Phylum: Chordata
- Class: Amphibia
- Order: Anura
- Family: Hemiphractidae
- Genus: Gastrotheca
- Species: G. pachachacae

Binomial name
- Gastrotheca pachachacae Catenazzi and von May, 2011

Synonyms
- Gastrotheca (Gastrotheca) pachachacae Catenazzi and von May, 2011

Species of frog

Gastrotheca pachachacae is a species of frog in the family Hemiphractidae. It is endemic to southern Peru.

== Description ==
The adult male frog measures 28.7-29.2 mm in snout-vent length and the female frog 35.3 mm. It is distinguished from other frogs by its call, by the tubercule on the heel, and by the first front toe longer than the middle front toe. The skin of the dorsum is gray with dark marks. The dorsal surfaces of the four legs are light brown. There are bars across back legs. The ventral surfaces of the legs are pink in color. Some of the toes are cream-white in color. The flanks are gray to light brown with black flecks. The top of the head can be light brown to gold in color with some dark marks. The iris of the eye is bronze in color with tiny black reticulations. The tympanum is brown in color.

== Etymology ==
Scientists named this frog pachachacae for the Pachachaca River, in whose watershed it was found.

== Habitat ==
Scientists first saw this frog in Chinchay cloud forest in Peru's Pacobamba District. The frogs were found high in the Pachacha River watershed. Scientists found the frogs on plants 1.5 m (4 ft 11 in) to 3 m (9.8 ft) above the ground, including at least one inside a bromeliad. Scientists infer that the frog could be nocturnal and arboreal, sheltering in bromeliads during the day. Scientists have seen the frog 3,050 m (10,010 ft) above sea level.

Scientists have not reported the frog in any protected places, but they did see it in another area, Mancomunidad Saywite - Choquequirao - Ampay, which is managed.

== Reproduction ==
Scientists found a female frog with a pouch on her back, so they believe the female frog of this species keeps her eggs in this pouch, like other frogs in Gastrotheca. Scientists do not know if the young emerge as froglets, like most young Gastrotheca, or swimming tadpoles.

== Threats ==
The IUCN classifies this frog as vulnerable to extinction. Some logging and farming take place within its range, but this is mostly sustainable.
