= Gastrotheca splendens =

Conservation status
- Data Deficient (IUCN 3.1)

Scientific classification
- Kingdom: Animalia
- Phylum: Chordata
- Class: Amphibia
- Order: Anura
- Family: Hemiphractidae
- Genus: Gastrotheca
- Species: G. splendens

Binomial name
- Gastrotheca splendens (Schmidt, 1857)
- The only precisely known record of Gastrotheca splendens is from the Amboró National Park in Bolivia

Synonyms
- Hyla splendens Schmidt, 1857

Species of frog

Gastrotheca splendens is a species of frog in the family Hemiphractidae. It is endemic to Bolivia. The only precisely known record is from the eastern slopes of the Andes in the Amboró National Park, in the Santa Cruz Department. Only two specimens are known. Common name Schmidt's marsupial frog has been coined for this species, in reference to Eduard Oscar Schmidt who described the species.

== Description ==
The holotype is a female measuring 45 mm (1.8 in) in snout–vent length, whereas the other known specimen is a male measuring 51 mm (2.0 in). The body is moderately robust. The is head is slightly wider than it is long but not as wide as the body. The snout is bluntly rounded. The tympanum is distinct; the supratympanic fold is weak. The fingers bear small and round discs as well as some basal webbing. The toes are less than half-webbed and bear discs that are slightly smaller than those on the fingers. Skin is dorsally smooth. Preserved specimens have dull grayish brown (tan) dorsal coloration with dark brown markings consisting of small, irregular spots (the female) or larger spots (the male). The venter is creamy white with dark brown flecks along lip margins and laterally on the chest and belly.

== Habitat and conservation ==
The precise location of the holotype collected in 1857 is not known. The other specimen was collected in a cloud forest at an elevation of 2,286 m (7,500 ft) above sea level in 1996. Despite surveys in the area, there are no new records, so the species must be very rare. It is threatened by habitat loss caused by agriculture and infrastructure development. Chytridiomycosis is a potential additional threat. Management of the Amboró National Park to ensure survival of this species is crucial.
