= Gastrotheca phelloderma =

Conservation status
- Vulnerable (IUCN 3.1)

Scientific classification
- Kingdom: Animalia
- Phylum: Chordata
- Class: Amphibia
- Order: Anura
- Family: Hemiphractidae
- Genus: Gastrotheca
- Species: G. phelloderma

Binomial name
- Gastrotheca phelloderma Lehr and Catenazzi, 2011

Synonyms
- Gastrotheca (Gastrotheca) phelloderma Lehr and Catenazzi, 2011

Species of frog

Gastrotheca phelloderma is a species of frog in the family Hemiphractidae. It is endemic to Peru.

== Description ==
The adult male frog can reach 43.8 mm in snout-vent length and the adult female frog 57.7 mm. The head is wider than it is long. The head is as wide as the body. Individuals can vary considerably in coloration, but scientists have described two specimens. One male frog had a cream-white ventrum with brown spots and brown paravertebral marks. The ventral surfaces of his four feet were yellow. One female frog had a gray-tan dorsum with red-brown paravertebral lines. Her flanks were gray-tan with tiny dark brown spots. She had light green spots on her head. The tops of her feet were red-brown, dark brown, and gray in color. The iris of her eye was red-brown in color with tiny black reticulations and a ring of bronze around the pupil.

== Habitat ==
Scientists first saw the frog in Pampa de Cuy, inside Parque Nacional del Rio Abiseo. The frog also lives in Alpamachay, in the Andes Mountains. Scientists have seen the frog between 3,380 m (11,090 ft) and 3,470 m (11,380 ft) above sea level.

== Reproduction ==
The female frog carries her eggs in a bag of skin on her back. Unlike other frogs in Gastrotheca, this frog breeds through larval development. Scientists have found 45-49 young in one pouch at the same time.

== Threats ==
The IUCN classifies this frog as vulnerable to extinctions. The frogs in Rio Abiseo National Park are insulated from human encroachment, but scientists detected the dangerous fungus Batrachochytrium dendrobatidis on other frogs in the park, so G. phalloderma could be in danger from chytridiomycosis.

== Original description ==
- Lehr E; Catenazzi A (2011). "A new species of marsupial frog (Anura: Hemiphractidae: Gastrotheca) from the Rio Abiseo National Park in Peru". Herpetologica. 67: 449–459.
