= Gastrotheca carinaceps =

Conservation status
- Data Deficient (IUCN 3.1)

Scientific classification
- Kingdom: Animalia
- Phylum: Chordata
- Class: Amphibia
- Order: Anura
- Family: Hemiphractidae
- Genus: Gastrotheca
- Species: G. carinaceps

Binomial name
- Gastrotheca carinaceps Duellman, Trueb, and Lehr, 2006

Synonyms
- Gastrotheca (Gastrotheca) carinaceps Duellman, Trueb, and Lehr, 2006

Species of frog

Gastrotheca carinaceps is a species of frog in the family Hemiphractidae. It is found in Peru.

== Habitat ==
This frog has been found in humid forests 2,200 m (7,200 ft) above sea level. Scientists have reported the frog in one protected place, Yanachaga-Chemillén National Park.

== Reproduction ==
Scientists believe this frog breeds through direct development, with the emerging as froglets, not tadpoles.

== Threats ==
The IUCN classifies this species as data deficient. Outside the park, it is subject to habitat loss in favor of agriculture, for example rocoto chili pepper farms. There is also selective logging within the park's borders.

== Original description ==
- Duellman W; Trueb L; Lehr E (2006). "A new species of marsupial frog (Anura: Hylidae: Gastrotheca) from the Amazon slopes of the Cordillera Oriental in Peru". Copeia.
