= Gastrotheca ernestoi =

Conservation status
- Least Concern (IUCN 3.1)

Scientific classification
- Kingdom: Animalia
- Phylum: Chordata
- Class: Amphibia
- Order: Anura
- Family: Hemiphractidae
- Genus: Gastrotheca
- Species: G. ernestoi

Binomial name
- Gastrotheca ernestoi Miranda-Ribeiro, 1920

Species of amphibian

Gastrotheca ernestoi is a species of frog in the family Hemiphractidae. Females measure 55.2–70.0 millimetres (2.17–2.76 in) in snout-vent length, and males measure 45.4–70.0 millimetres (1.79–2.76 in) in snout-vent-length. The species undergoes direct development.

Gastrotheca ernestoi is endemic to Brazil. It was described in 1920, and is listed as of Least Concern by the IUCN.

== Taxonomy ==
Gastrotheca ernestoi was described by Alípio de Miranda Ribeiro in 1920. In 1984, it was placed as a synonym of Gastrotheca microdiscus.

In 2007, the species was re-established by Ulisses Caramaschi and Miguel Trefaut Rodrigues.

== Distribution ==
Gastrotheca ernestoi is endemic to Brazil. It is found in Rio de Janeiro, São Paulo, and Minas Gerais. The species' extent of occurrence is around 66,245 square kilometres (25,577 sq mi).

Gastrotheca ernestoi is found in the tree canopy, at elevations of up to 1,200 metres (3,900 ft).

== Description ==
Females measure 55.2–70.0 millimetres (2.17–2.76 in) in snout-vent length, and males measure 45.4–70.0 millimetres (1.79–2.76 in) in snout-vent-length. The skin on the back is smooth. In preservative, the skin on the back is cream, the eyelids have brown blotches, and the suprascapularary region has brown patches that sometimes form a chevron-like pattern. A brown stripe runs from the snout, over the canthus rostralis, and ends on the flank. The underside is white.

The skin in the middle of the head is slightly co-ossified to the skull. The snout is rounded dorsally and in profile. The tympanum is circular.

Gastrotheca ernestoi carries its eggs on its back. It undergoes direct development.

== Conservation ==
In 2021, the IUCN assessed Gastrotheca ernestoi as of Least Concern. The population is assumed to be large, and is faces no major threats.
