= Gastrotheca phalarosa =

Conservation status
- Data Deficient (IUCN 3.1)

Scientific classification
- Kingdom: Animalia
- Phylum: Chordata
- Class: Amphibia
- Order: Anura
- Family: Hemiphractidae
- Genus: Gastrotheca
- Species: G. phalarosa

Binomial name
- Gastrotheca phalarosa Duellman & Venegas, 2005

Species of frog

Gastrotheca phalarosa is a species of frog in the family Hemiphractidae. It is endemic to Peru.

== Habitat ==
This frog has been found in Yungas forests, where individuals have been seen the on grass and near terrestrial bromeliads. Scientists have found the frog between 3,119 m (10,233 ft) and 3,435 m (11,270 ft) above sea level.

Scientists have reported the frog in one protected place, Los Chilchos Private Conservation Area.

== Reproduction ==
This frog reproduces through larval development. Scientists have reported tadpoles in one small pool 40 cm deep.

== Threats ==
The IUCN classifies this species as data deficient.

== First paper ==
- Duellman WE; Venegas P (2005). "Marsupial frogs (Anura: Hylidae: Gastrotheca) from the Andes of northern Peru with descriptions of two new species". Herpetologica. 61: 295–307.
