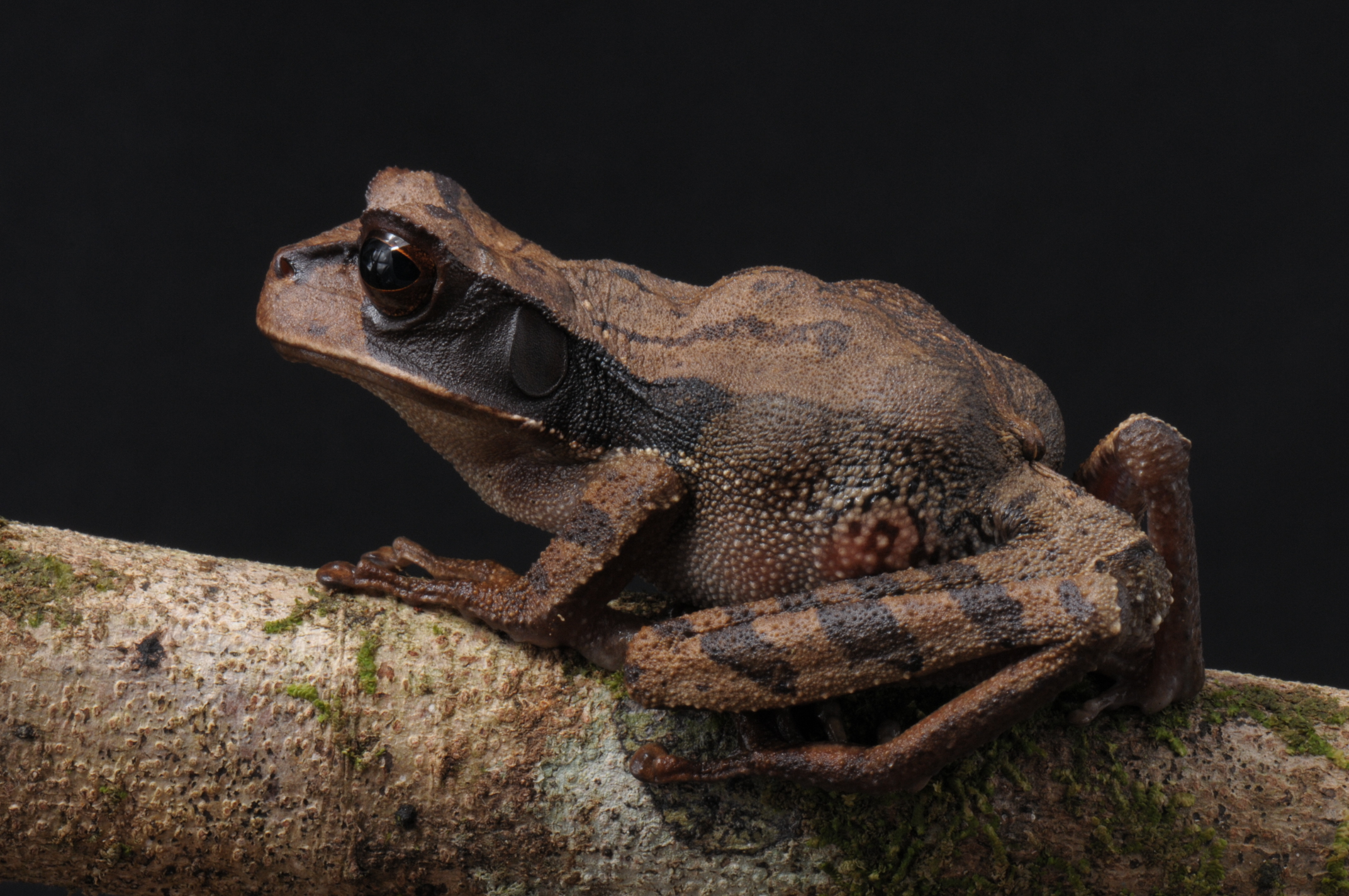

Conservation status
- Least Concern (IUCN 3.1)

Scientific classification
- Kingdom: Animalia
- Phylum: Chordata
- Class: Amphibia
- Order: Anura
- Family: Hemiphractidae
- Genus: Gastrotheca
- Species: G. recava

Binomial name
- Gastrotheca recava Teixeira, Vechio, Recoder, Carnaval, Strangas, Damasceno, Sena, and Rodrigues, 2012

Synonyms
- Gastrotheca (Gastrotheca) recava Teixeira, Vechio, Recoder, Carnaval, Strangas, Damasceno, Sena, and Rodrigues, 2012; Eotheca recava (Teixeira, Vechio, Recoder, Carnaval, Strangas, Damasceno, Sena, and Rodrigues, 2012)

= Gastrotheca recava =

Species of frog

Gastrotheca recava is a species of frog in the family Hemiphractidae. It is endemic to Brazil.

== Description ==
The adult male frog measures 57.08–75.41 mm in snout-vent length and the adult female frog 67.21–84.92 mm. The skin of the dorsum is light brown to beige in color with brown chevrons oriented anteriorly. There is a thin brown intraorbital line. There is a brown line from the nostril to each eye all the way to the ear. There is a red-brown line from the head that fades as it gets to the end of the body. There is a white line from over the mouth to the groin. The dorsal surfaces of the four legs have dark brown lines going across. The hidden surfaces of the hind legs has darker marks.

== Etymology ==
Scientists gave this frog the species name recava because it is Latin for "arched inward." The frog's skull bones arch inward.

== Reproduction ==
The female frog carries her eggs in a pouch on her back. The young emerge as froglets about 0.8 g (0.028 oz) in size.

== Habitat ==
This frog lives in closed-canopy primary and secondary forest. People have seen the frog sitting on branches 10 cm (3.9 in) to 500 cm (200 in) above the ground. It has little tolerance to habitat disturbance but has been seen on cacao farms where people have preserved tree cover to provide shade. Scientists have seen the frog between 0 m (0 ft) and 530 m (1,740 ft) above sea level.

Scientists have reported the frog in protected places.

== Threats ==
The IUCN classifies this frog as least concern of extinction given the breadth of remaining habitatable forest in Bahia. What threat it faces comes from habitat conversion to farms and livestock cultivation. However, because cacao is a major export, people often build cabrucas, which are traditional farms that preserve tree cover to provide shade. The frogs can thrive on these farms.
