= Ruiz's marsupial frog =

Conservation status
- Near Threatened (IUCN 3.1)

Scientific classification
- Kingdom: Animalia
- Phylum: Chordata
- Class: Amphibia
- Order: Anura
- Family: Hemiphractidae
- Genus: Gastrotheca
- Species: G. ruizi

Binomial name
- Gastrotheca ruizi Duellman & Burrowes, 1986

Species of amphibian

Ruiz's marsupial frog (Gastrotheca ruizi) is a species of frog in the family Hemiphractidae. It is endemic to Colombia.

== Habitat ==
This frog lives in open places and on vegetation near streams. It has only been reported near cultivated areas. Scientists have seen the frog between 2,000 and 2,319 m (6,562 and 7,608 ft) above sea level.

== Reproduction ==
The female frog carries her eggs in a pouch on her back. She brings the tadpoles to water. One female was observed with 137 eggs at a time. The eggs are about 4.5 mm in diameter.

== Threats ==
The IUCN classifies this species as near threatened of danger of dying out. Possible threats include urbanization, water pollution from farms and the removal of the reeds and shrubs near breeding areas. However, this frog has shown some tolerance to habitat disturbance.
