= Gastrotheca weinlandii =

Conservation status
- Least Concern (IUCN 3.1)

Scientific classification
- Kingdom: Animalia
- Phylum: Chordata
- Class: Amphibia
- Order: Anura
- Family: Hemiphractidae
- Genus: Gastrotheca
- Species: G. weinlandii

Binomial name
- Gastrotheca weinlandii (Steindachner, 1892)

Synonyms
- Nototrema weinlandii Steindachner, 1892; Hyla pusilla Melin, 1941; Gastrotheca weinlandii Peters, 1955; Gastrotheca (Opisthodelphys) weinlandi Dubois, 1987 "1986"; Gastrotheca (Amphignathodon) weinlandi Duellman, 2015; Gastrotheca (Amphignathodon) cornuta Duellman, 2015; Amphignathodon weinlandi Dubois, Ohler, and Pyron, 2021

Species of frog

Gastrotheca weinlandii is a species of frog in the family Hemiphractidae. It is found in Colombia, Ecuador, and Peru.

== Description ==
The adult male frog measures 63.0 to 85.7 mm in snout-vent length and the adult female 68.4 to 86.0 mm. The frogs in different subpopulations can vary considerably in color pattern: Frogs in Sucumbíos are brown with olive-brown marks and yellow pigmentation on their sides. These frogs have light yellow color on their mouths. The sides of the head are olive-green. The throat and ventral areas are white or cream in color. The iris of the eye is pink-bronze in color with brown lines. The frogs in Napo are brown in color with darker brown or gray-brown marks. The head is dark brown in color. The sides are dark brown with cream-brown marks. The bottoms of the feet are blue in color with brown marks. The belly is lighter in color with brown marks. The iris of the eye is dark in color. Frogs in Morona Santiago are gray-green in color with brown marks. The belly is mottled brown and green. The bottoms of the feet are brown in color. The head is yellow-green in color. The iris of the eye has brown reticulations. The young frogs are green with olive-brown color. The head has brown marks. The belly is translucent yellow-green. The iris of the eye is bronze in color with black reticulations.

== Home ==
This arboreal, nocturnal frog lives in cloud forests on mountains. Scientists have seen the frog between 1,100 and 2,370 m (3,610 and 7,780 ft) above sea level.

Scientists have reported the frogs in some protected places: Parque Nacional Sumaco Napo-Galeras, Reserva Ecológica Antisana, Parque Nacional Llanganates, Parque Nacional Sangay, and Parque Nacional Natural Alto Fragua-Indiwasi.

== Reproduction ==
Like other species in Gastrotheca, the female frog carries her eggs in a pouch on her back. The eggs hatch into small froglets. There is no free-swimming tadpole stage.

== Threats ==
The IUCN classifies this frog as least concern. Its principal threats are habitat loss associated with livestock cultivation, logging, farming, and human habitation.
