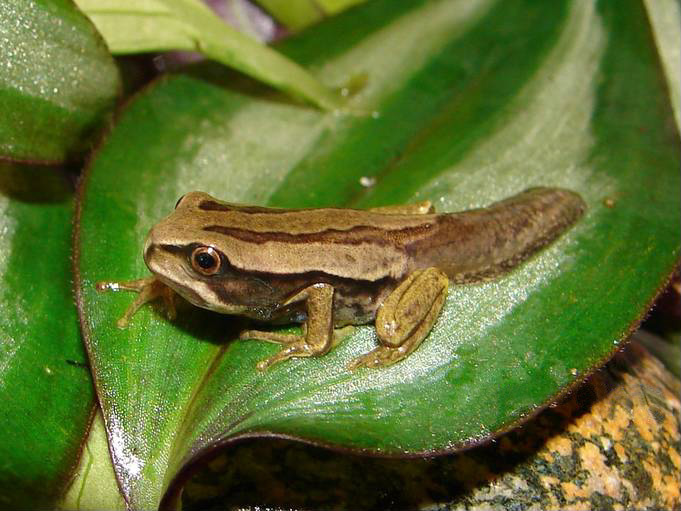

Conservation status
- Least Concern (IUCN 3.1)

Scientific classification
- Kingdom: Animalia
- Phylum: Chordata
- Class: Amphibia
- Order: Anura
- Family: Hemiphractidae
- Genus: Gastrotheca
- Species: G. dunni

Binomial name
- Gastrotheca dunni Lutz, 1977

Synonyms
- Gastrotheca argenteovirens dunni Lutz, 1977

= Gastrotheca dunni =

Species of frog

Gastrotheca dunni is a species of frog in the family Hemiphractidae. It is endemic to the northern part of the Cordillera Occidental in northern Antioquia, Colombia. The specific name dunni honors Emmett Reid Dunn, an American herpetologist. Common name Dunn's marsupial frog has been coined for it.

== Description ==
Adult males measure 32–43 mm (1.3–1.7 in) and adult females 33–55 mm (1.3–2.2 in) in snout–vent length. The head is slightly wider than it is long. The snout bluntly rounded. The tympanum is brown. The finger discs are much wider than the digits. The toes are about half-webbed. The dorsum is tan or dull green and may have dark brown longitudinal paravertebral markings or dark flecks. Most specimens have a pale dorsolateral stripe. The flanks are uniform gray or marked with dark spots. The ventrum is pale creamy gray, rarely with dark flecks.

== Habitat and conservation ==
Gastrotheca dunni is a common and adaptable species that occurs in primary and secondary forests and grasslands, as well as anthropogenic habitats such as plantations, farmland, and urban gardens. Its altitudinal range is 2,000–4,000 m (6,600–13,100 ft) above sea level. The female broods her eggs in a pouch on her back, then carries the tadpoles to a pool where they develop further. This species is facing no major threats.
