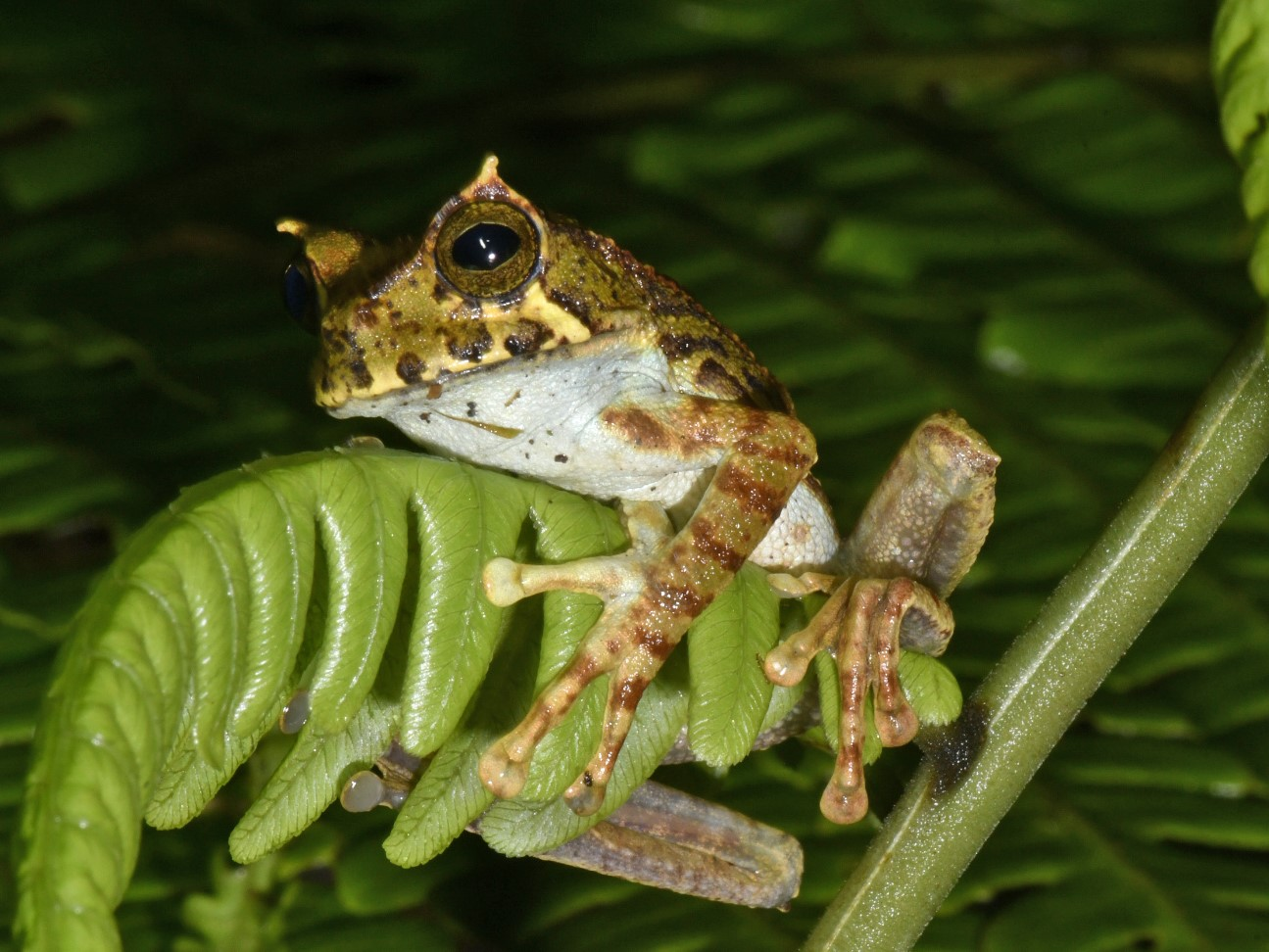

Conservation status
- Endangered (IUCN 3.1)

Scientific classification
- Kingdom: Animalia
- Phylum: Chordata
- Class: Amphibia
- Order: Anura
- Family: Hemiphractidae
- Genus: Gastrotheca
- Species: G. dendronastes

Binomial name
- Gastrotheca dendronastes Duellman, 1983

Synonyms
- Gastrotheca dendronastes Duellman, 1983; Gastrotheca (Opisthodelphys) dendronastes Dubois, 1987 "1986"; Gastrotheca (Amphignathodon) dendronastes Duellman, 2015; Amphignathodon andaquiensis Dubois, Ohler, and Pyron, 2021

= Gastrotheca dendronastes =

Species of frog

Gastrotheca dendronastes is a species of frog in the family Hemiphractidae. It is found in Colombia and Ecuador.

== Description ==
The adult male frog measures about 39.8–74.8 mm in snout-vent length and the adult female frog 61.9–73.5 mm. At night, the skin of the dorsum is brown with darker brown translateral stripes. During the day, the skin of the frog's back is lighter brown or olive-brown in color with pink stripes going across and irregular green blotches. The flanks can be olive-green or dark brown in color with cream-white stripes bordered in dark brown. There is a cream-white line on the lip. The membranes between the toes are red-brown in color. The belly is cream-yellow in color with red-brown marks. The iris of the eye is bronze in color with small black reticulations.

== Habitat ==
This frog lives on plants in primary and secondary montane forests. They have only been seen in ravines with streams. People see them on branches or Heliconia stems 2 to 5 m (6 ft 7 in to 16 ft 5 in) above the ground. Scientists have seen the frog between 1,230 and 2,090 m (4,040 and 6,860 ft) above sea level.

Scientists have seen the frog in several protected places, including Parque Nacional Natural Farallones de Cali.

== Reproduction ==
The female frog carries her eggs in a pouch on her back. This animal breeds through direct development with no free-swimming tadpole stage.

== Threats ==
The IUCN classifies this frog as endangered. Scientists believe there are no more than 249 mature adults alive at any one time. The principal threats are habitat loss associated with mining, cattle cultivation, and both legal and illegal farms. There was a significant population decline in the 1990s. Scientists believe the cause is likely to have been disease, but this is unconfirmed.
