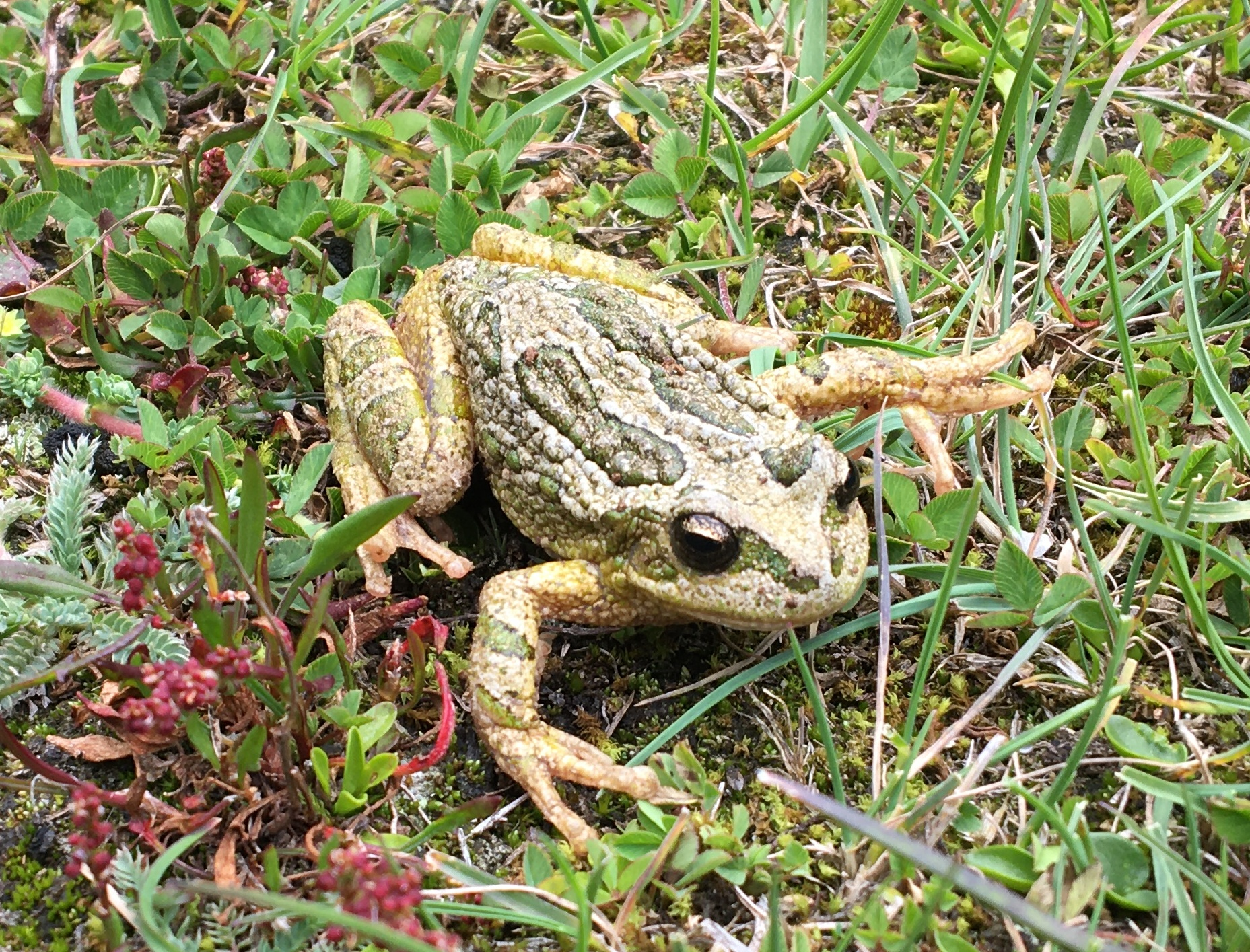

Conservation status
- Least Concern (IUCN 3.1)

Scientific classification
- Kingdom: Animalia
- Phylum: Chordata
- Class: Amphibia
- Order: Anura
- Family: Hemiphractidae
- Genus: Gastrotheca
- Species: G. peruana

Binomial name
- Gastrotheca peruana (Boulenger, 1900)

= Peru marsupial frog =

Species of amphibian

The Peru marsupial frog (Gastrotheca peruana) is a species of frog in the family Hemiphractidae that is endemic to Peru.

== Habitat ==
Its natural habitats are subtropical and tropical high-altitude grasslands, rivers, freshwater marshes, intermittent freshwater marshes, arable land, pastureland, rural gardens, and urban areas. Scientists have seen the frog between 2,300 and 4,600 m (7,500 and 15,100 ft) above sea level.

Scientists have reported the frog in one protected area, Parque Nacional de Huascaran. It is suspected in Huayllay National Sanctuary, Junín National Reserve, and Chacamarca Historical Sanctuary.

== Young ==
This frog has young in ditches, permanent and temporary ponds, and other still bodies of water. Frogs that live above 3,000 m (9,800 ft) above sea level hatch into small froglets. Eggs lower than 2,300 m (7,500 ft) above sea level hatch into ordinary tadpoles. In between, eggs hatch into tadpoles with detectable hind legs.

== Threats ==
The IUCN classifies this frog as not in danger of extinction. What threat it faces comes from habitat infringement associated with mineral concessions.

This frog is kept as a pet, and has been recorded in the pet trade in Germany, although without significant threat to the species.
