= Gastrotheca gemma =

Scientific classification
- Kingdom: Animalia
- Phylum: Chordata
- Class: Amphibia
- Order: Anura
- Family: Hemiphractidae
- Genus: Gastrotheca
- Species: G. gemma

Binomial name
- Gastrotheca gemma Venegas, García Ayachi, Echevarría, Paluh, Chávez-Arribasplata, Marchelie, & Catenazzi, 2021

Species of frog

Gastrotheca gemma is a species of frog in the family Hemiphractidae. It is found in the Cordillera de Colán National Sanctuary in Peru.

== Description ==
Scientists saw two adult male frogs that were 56.9 and 59.5 mm in snout-vent length and two adult female frogs that were 69.7 and 71.8 mm. The male and female frogs had different color patterns: The female frogs' flanks were green in color with no marks. The undersides of the hind legs were yellow-green with black marks in some places and yellow-green with some gray-brown in others. The throats and chests were green in color. The ventral areas were yellow-green in color, possibly with a big gray patch. The male frogs' flanks were green in color with darker green marks. Their hind legs showed yellow-green with black reticulations and cream-brown in other areas. The throats and chests were yellow-green in color. In both male and female frogs, there was yellow-green color near the groin. The iris of the eye was turquoise in color with thin black reticulations. Some individuals also had an orange ring in the iris. The plantar surfaces of the four feet were gray or gray-brown in color.

== Etymology ==
Scientists named this frog gemma, the Latin word for "gem," because of the frogs' turquoise eyes.

== Habitat ==
Scientists saw the frog between 3,130 m (10,270 ft) and 3,180 m (10,430 ft) above sea level, near the top of the Cordillera de Colán.

Scientists have reported this frog in a protected area, Santuario Nacional Cordillera de Colán.

== Reproduction ==
The female frog carries her eggs in a pouch on her back, like other frogs in Gastrotheca. The young emerge small froglets, with no free-swimming tadpole stage.

== Threats ==
In the early 2020s, scientists tested the frogs for Batrachochytrium dendrobatidis and did not find much of it. B. dendrobatidis causes the fungal disease chytridiomycosis, which has killed many kinds of amphibians.
