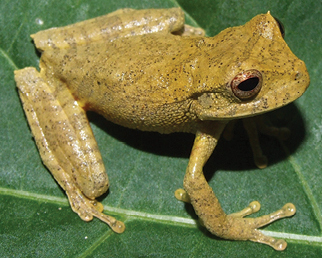

Conservation status
- Least Concern (IUCN 3.1)

Scientific classification
- Kingdom: Animalia
- Phylum: Chordata
- Class: Amphibia
- Order: Anura
- Family: Hemiphractidae
- Genus: Gastrotheca
- Species: G. pulchra

Binomial name
- Gastrotheca pulchra Caramaschi and Rodrigues, 2007

Synonyms
- Gastrotheca (Eotheca) pulchra Caramaschi and Rodrigues, 2007; Eotheca pulchra (Caramaschi & Rodrigues, 2007)

= Gastrotheca pulchra =

Species of frog

Gastrotheca pulchra is a species of frog in the family Hemiphractidae. It is endemic to Brazil.

== Habitat ==
This frog is found in primary and secondary tropical forests with trees about 30 m (98 ft) high. The frog has shown some tolerance to habitat disturbance so long as the canopy remains intact. People see the frog on plants 1 m (3 ft 3 in) above the ground. Scientists have seen the frog between 0 m (0 ft) and 600 m (2,000 ft) above sea level.

Scientists have seen this frog in protected parks.

== Reproduction ==
Scientists found one female frog with ten developing eggs in a pouch on her back.

== Threats ==
The IUCN classifies this frog as least concern of extinction. In some parts of its range, the frog may be in danger from habitat conversion to farms, livestock cultivation, and urban areas. However, much of the silviculture consists of cacao tree farms, which preserve canopy, so the frogs do not have much trouble living there.

== Original description ==
- Caramaschi U; Rodrigues MT (2007). "Taxonomic status of the species of Gastrotheca Fitzinger 1847 (Amphibia, Anura, Amphignathodontidae) of the Atlantic rainforest of eastern Brazil, with description of a new species". Boletim do Museu Nacional Rio de Janeiro. 52: 1–19.
