= Gastrotheca christiani =

Conservation status
- Critically Endangered (IUCN 3.1)

Scientific classification
- Kingdom: Animalia
- Phylum: Chordata
- Class: Amphibia
- Order: Anura
- Family: Hemiphractidae
- Genus: Gastrotheca
- Species: G. christiani

Binomial name
- Gastrotheca christiani Laurent, 1967

Synonyms
- Gastrotheca christiani Laurent, 1967; Gastrotheca (Opisthodelphys) christiani Dubois, 1987 "1986"; Gastrotheca (Gastrotheca) christiani Duellman, 2015

Species of frog

Gastrotheca christiani is a species of frog in the family Hemiphractidae. It is endemic to Argentina.

== Habitat ==
This frog can only live in a narrow range of microhabitat. Adult frogs have been observed in cracks in the rock and in arboreal locations, such as tree crowns and holes in trees in Yungas forests. Scientists have seen the frog between 1,550 and 2,600 m (5,090 and 8,530 ft) above sea level.

Scientists have reported the frog in protected places: Baritú National Park and Calilegua National Park.

== Reproduction ==
The female frog carries her eggs in a bag of skin on her back. This frog emerges from the frog as a small froglet, not a tadpole.

== Threats ==
Scientists from the IUCN say the frog is critically endangered of dying out and Argentina classifies it as an endangered species. The principal threat has been habitat loss as humans collect specific species of trees for wood, build transportation infrastructure, and raise cattle. There is some clear-cutting of primary forest in favor of exotic wood. When scientists searched for the frog outside Calilegua National Park in 1996, they did not find any. Within the park, there is still considerable suitable habitat, so the frog may not be entirely extinct now.

In 1996, scientists tested specimens for the dangerous fungus Batrachocytrium dendrobatidis and did not find it. So they are not sure if the disease chytridiomycosis killed the frogs.
