= Gastrotheca mittaliiti =

Scientific classification
- Kingdom: Animalia
- Phylum: Chordata
- Class: Amphibia
- Order: Anura
- Family: Hemiphractidae
- Genus: Gastrotheca
- Species: G. mittaliiti

Binomial name
- Gastrotheca mittaliiti Venegas, Echevarría, García Ayachi, Wong, Chávez, García-Bravo, Catenazzi, and Castroviejo-Fisher, 2026

Species of frog

Gastrotheca mittaliiti is a species of frog in the family Hemiphractidae. It is endemic to Peru.

== Description ==
The adult male frog measures 27.6–32.5 mm in snout-vent length. There is a thick skin fold over each tympanum to the flank. There are small disks on the toes of all four feet.

== Home ==
This frog lives in the subalpine paramo Scientists have seen it 3,308 m (10,853 ft) above sea level.

== Taxonomy ==
Scientists say this frog is a sister species to Gastrotheca trachyplevra.
