= Gastrotheca turnerorum =

Conservation status
- Endangered (IUCN 3.1)

Scientific classification
- Kingdom: Animalia
- Phylum: Chordata
- Class: Amphibia
- Order: Anura
- Family: Hemiphractidae
- Genus: Gastrotheca
- Species: G. turnerorum

Binomial name
- Gastrotheca turnerorum Carvajal-Endara, Coloma, Morales-Mite, Guayasamin, Székely, and Duellman, 2019

Species of frog

Gastrotheca turnerorum, or Turner's marsupial frog, is a frog. Scientists have found it in Ecuador and Peru.

== Description ==
The adult male frog measures 50.0–55.6 mm in snout-vent length and the adult female frog 54.0–58.2 mm. The skin of the dorsum can be brown or green in color. The frog is covered with small dots, mostly cream-white or cream-yellow. Some of the lines on the face are made of bronze dots. The flanks are dark brown to bronze in color with tiny cream-white dots. The belly is dark brown in color with cream-white dots. The iris of the eye is cream-yellow in color with dark brown reticulations and a thick dark brown horizontal bar across the whole eye.

== Etymology ==
Scientists named this frog turnerorum for the Turner family and their work in conservation, preserving biodiversity, and environmental education.

== Habitat ==
This nocturnal, semi-arboreal frog lives in paramo and sub-paramo. Scientists have reported these frogs between 2,899 m (9,511 ft) and 3,513 m (11,526 ft) above sea level.

Scientists have reported this frog in protected areas: Parque Nacional Yacuri, Parque Nacional Podocarpusa, and Reserva Tapichalaca.

== Reproduction ==
The female frog carries her eggs in a pouch on her back. Scientists have found tadpoles in ponds and lagoons.

== Threats ==
The IUCN classifies this frog as endangered. It faces habitat loss and habitat degratation from fires, agriculture, livestock cultivation, overtourism, pesticides, and introduced pathogens and other animals, such as trout.
