= Gastrotheca oresbios =

Conservation status
- Endangered (IUCN 3.1)

Scientific classification
- Kingdom: Animalia
- Phylum: Chordata
- Class: Amphibia
- Order: Anura
- Family: Hemiphractidae
- Genus: Gastrotheca
- Species: G. oresbios

Binomial name
- Gastrotheca oresbios Duellman and Venegas, 2016

Species of frog

Gastrotheca oresbios is a species of frog in the family Hemiphractidae. It is endemic to Peru.

== Description ==
This frog has a dark canthal stripe and dark paravertebral marks.

== Habitat ==
This arboreal frog has been found on bromeliad plants and other vegetation. Scientists know the frog from exactly two places, one 3,119 m (10,233 ft) above sea level and one 3,290 m (10,790 ft) above sea level.

The frog has been reported in one protected place, Los Chilchos Private Conservation Area. It has been a protected place since 2012.

== Threats ==
The IUCN classifies this frog as endangered. Specific threats are not known, but scientists suspect habitat loss, given the extent of cow pasturage near its known habitat.
