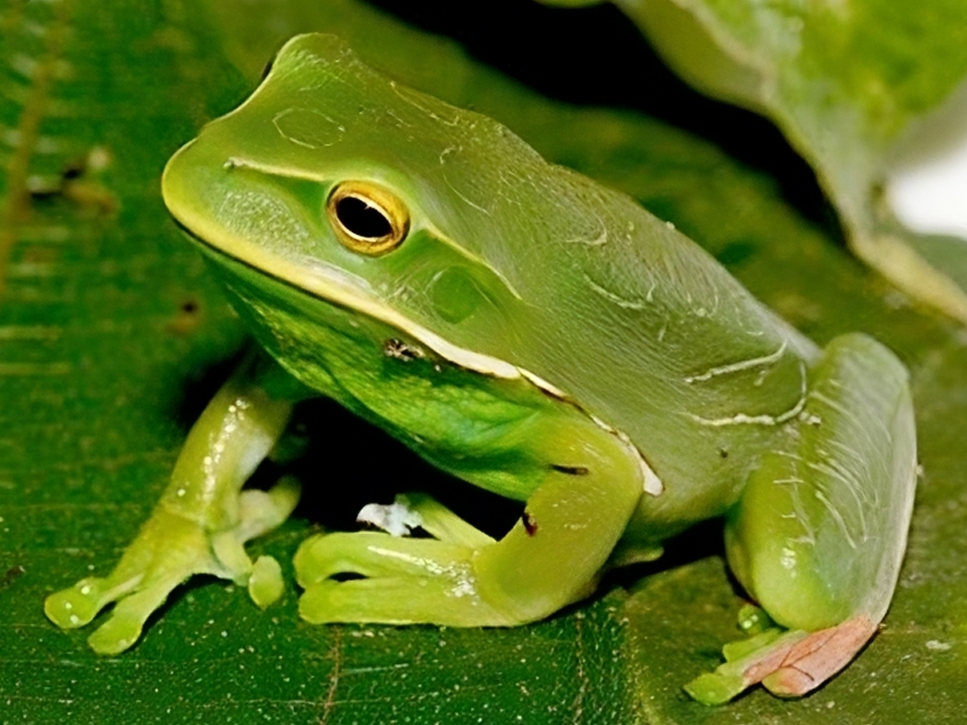

Conservation status
- Least Concern (IUCN 3.1)

Scientific classification
- Kingdom: Animalia
- Phylum: Chordata
- Class: Amphibia
- Order: Anura
- Family: Hemiphractidae
- Genus: Gastrotheca
- Species: G. albolineata

Binomial name
- Gastrotheca albolineata (Lutz and Lutz, 1939)

Synonyms
- Hyla albolineata A. Lutz & B. Lutz, 1939

= Gastrotheca albolineata =

Species of amphibian

Gastrotheca albolineata (common name: white-lined treefrog) is a frog species in family Hemiphractidae. It is endemic to southeastern Brazil and known from São Paulo, Rio de Janeiro, and Espírito Santo states at elevations of 600–1,400 m (2,000–4,600 ft) asl.

Gastrotheca albolineata is a canopy dweller in primary and older secondary rainforests. It requires big trees as its habitat. Females carry the eggs on their backs, and eggs develop directly to froglets.

Scientists have reported the frog in protected areas.

It is a common species but difficult to observe. It is not considered threatened by the International Union for Conservation of Nature (IUCN), but deforestation and agricultural encroachment are localized threats.
