= Gastrotheca piperata =

Conservation status
- Least Concern (IUCN 3.1)

Scientific classification
- Kingdom: Animalia
- Phylum: Chordata
- Class: Amphibia
- Order: Anura
- Family: Hemiphractidae
- Genus: Gastrotheca
- Species: G. piperata

Binomial name
- Gastrotheca piperata Duellman & Köhler, 2005

Species of frog

Gastrotheca piperata is a species of frog in the family Hemiphractidae.

== Distribution and habitat ==
This arboreal frog is endemic to Bolivia. Gastrotheca piperata can be found in the areas of higher montane forests. Its natural habitats are subtropical or tropical moist montane forests, where it is seen on vegetation approximately 3 m (9.8 ft) above the ground. Males have been heard calling from the canopy. It has the ability to adapt to habitat degradation and has been seen on cattle ranches. It can also be found along the eastern Andean slopes of Cochabamba and Santa Cruz Departments, Bolivia.

Scientists have reported the frog from two protected areas: Parque Nacional Carrasco and Parque Nacional Amboró.

== Biology ==
Gastrotheca piperata is dispersed over a large area that includes two protected areas which allows the species to not be in any concern to become an endangered species. It is threatened by habitat loss. can be found on high vegetation. When males are calling females, it is recorded that the males call from the location of canopies of small trees. Females carry their eggs in pouches of skin on their backs and release their tadpoles into small puddles and ditches.

== Threats ==
The IUCN classifies this species as least concern of extinction. If all the remaining forest were converted to ranchland, the frog could be in danger in the future. Scientists detected the fungus Batrachochytrium dendrobatidis in these frog populations many times in the 1990s and in 2001, but because the population remains large, they speculate chytridiomycosis may not pose an existential threat.
