= Gastrotheca aguaruna =

Conservation status
- Near Threatened (IUCN 3.1)

Scientific classification
- Kingdom: Animalia
- Phylum: Chordata
- Class: Amphibia
- Order: Anura
- Family: Hemiphractidae
- Genus: Gastrotheca
- Species: G. aguaruna

Binomial name
- Gastrotheca aguaruna Duellman, Barley, and Venegas, 2014

Synonyms
- Gastrotheca (Duellmania) aguaruna Duellman, Barley, and Venegas, 2014

Species of frog

Gastrotheca aguaruna is a frog in the family Hemiphractidae. It is found in Peru.

== Habitat ==
This frog has been seen on mountains with agricultural development and in patches of dwarf forest. People see the frogs on bushes or other vegetation near slow, marshy streams, in ponds and bromeliad plants, and on a farm fields. Scientists saw the frog between 2,360 m (7,740 ft) and 3,308 m (10,853 ft) above sea level.

Scientists have reported this frog in two private protected parks: Área de Conservación Privada Huiquilla and Área de Conservación Privada Los Chilchos.

== Reproduction ==
The female frog carries her eggs in a pouch on her back. The young emerge as tadpoles. They develop in ponds.

== Threats ==
The IUCN classifies this species as near threatened. What threat it faces comes from wildfires in the upland grasslands. Livestock can trample the grass, but this is less serious. Scientists believe bacterial disease may also affect this frog, having found Aeromonas caviae on some.
