= Gastrotheca spectabilis =

Conservation status
- Data Deficient (IUCN 3.1)

Scientific classification
- Kingdom: Animalia
- Phylum: Chordata
- Class: Amphibia
- Order: Anura
- Family: Hemiphractidae
- Genus: Gastrotheca
- Species: G. spectabilis

Binomial name
- Gastrotheca spectabilis Duellman and Venegas, 2016

Species of frog

Gastrotheca spectabilis is a species of frog in the family Hemiphractidae. It is endemic to Peru.

== Description ==
This frog has white labial, canthal, and rostral stripes.

== Habitat ==
This nocturnal frog has been found in forests and paramo on mountains. People have seen them on moss or in bromeliad plants 2 m (6 ft 7 in) to 4 m (13 ft) above the ground. The frog has been reported 2,560 m (8,400 ft) above sea level.

== Threats ==
The IUCN classifies this species as data deficient.
