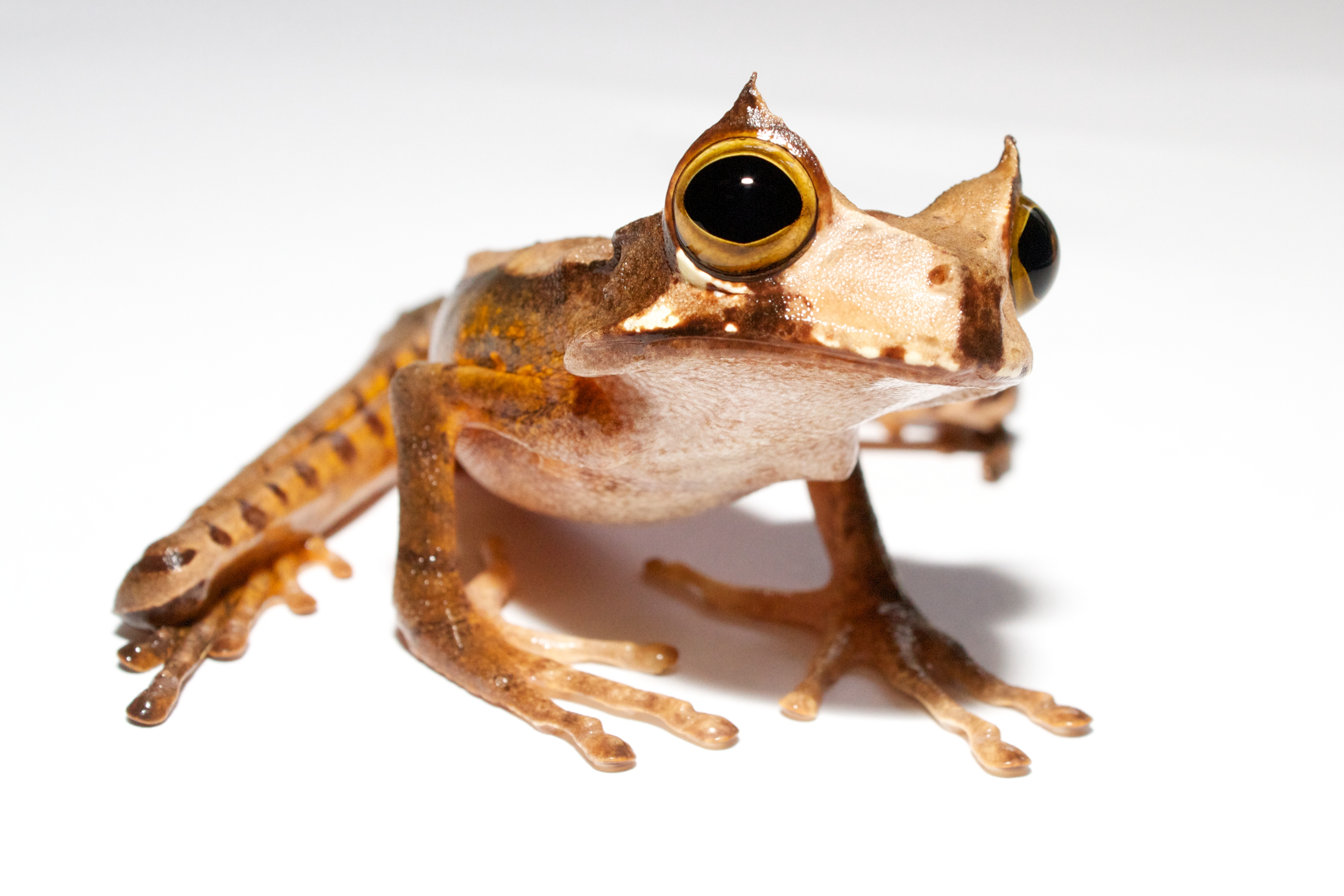

Conservation status
- Critically Endangered (IUCN 3.1)

Scientific classification
- Kingdom: Animalia
- Phylum: Chordata
- Class: Amphibia
- Order: Anura
- Family: Hemiphractidae
- Genus: Gastrotheca
- Species: G. cornuta

Binomial name
- Gastrotheca cornuta (Boulenger, 1898)

Synonyms
- Hyla ceratophrys Stejneger, 1911

= Horned marsupial frog =

Species of amphibian

The horned marsupial frog (Gastrotheca cornuta), originally named Nototrema cornutum (Boulenger) after the first describer George Albert Boulenger in 1898), is a species of frog in the family Hemiphractidae. It is an arboreal species found in Colombia, Costa Rica, Ecuador and Panama. Its natural habitats are tropical moist lowland forests and montane cloud forests. It is threatened by habitat loss.

== Description ==
An adult Gastrotheca cornuta grows to about 7 to 8 centimetres (2.8 to 3.1 in) long. The head is broad and the snout is rounded when viewed from above. The iris of the eye is bronze with a greenish center and the upper eyelid has a triangular peak. The skin on the back is smooth and has a number of transverse ridges. The fingers are unwebbed but have circular pads on their tips. The hind legs are long and the toes are partially webbed. The female has a pouch on her lower back in which she broods her eggs. The body color is pale brown at night but dark brown by day and there are pale markings between the mouth and eyes during the day. Permanent color features include narrow dark transverse stripes on the body, a dark line running from near the eye to the groin and a pinkish or light brown belly.

== Distribution ==
Gastrotheca cornuta is a nocturnal species and is found in tropical forests and lower montane cloud forests in Limón Province, Costa Rica, and in adjoining areas of Panama on the Atlantic slope at altitudes between 300 and 700 metres (980 and 2,300 ft). In Colombia, Ecuador, and Panama it occurs on the Pacific side of the divide at altitudes between 90 and 1,000 metres (300 and 3,280 ft) above sea level. It lives high in the forest canopy.

== Life cycle ==
The male Gastrotheca cornuta calls from high in the canopy to attract a mate. His call sounds like a champagne cork being drawn. The eggs of Gastrotheca cornuta are the largest known amphibian eggs. They are carried in individual chambers in the female's brood pouch. The developing embryos have umbrella-like external gills that spread out against the pouch wall, which is highly vascular. Gas exchange takes place through the wall of the pouch. There is no free-living tadpole stage for this species and when their development is complete, tiny froglets make their way out of the brood pouch.

== Status ==
Gastrotheca cornuta is listed as "Critically Endangered" in the IUCN Red List of Threatened Species. Numbers of individuals across its range have been decreasing and it is no longer present in Costa Rica and Panama on the Atlantic slope. It has also decreased in numbers in Colombia and in Ecuador where it never was common. Its status in eastern Panama is unknown. The reasons for its decline include the disease chytridiomycosis, deforestation, and human activities.

Scientists have reported the frog in several protected areas. It is also subject to captive breeding programs at Panama Amphibian Rescue and Conservation Project and Balsa de los Sapos in Ecuador.

== Dollo's Rule ==
Gastrotheca cornuta is a noted exception to Dollo's Rule, which states that evolution is largely irreversible as macro-evolution takes place in smaller micro-evolutionary steps. It re-evolved mandibular teeth after over 200 million years of toothlessness in the lower jaw.
