= Gastrotheca nebulanastes =

Conservation status
- Endangered (IUCN 3.1)

Scientific classification
- Kingdom: Animalia
- Phylum: Chordata
- Class: Amphibia
- Order: Anura
- Family: Hemiphractidae
- Genus: Gastrotheca
- Species: G. nebulanastes

Binomial name
- Gastrotheca nebulanastes Duellman, Catenazzi, and Blackburn, 2011

Synonyms
- Gastrotheca (Gastrotheca) nebulanastesDuellman, Catenazzi, and Blackburn, 2011

Species of frog

Gastrotheca nebulanastes, the Kosñipata marsupial frog or nebulous marsupial frog, is a species of frog. It lives in Peru.

== Description ==
The adult frog is about 37.3 mm from nose to rear end. Unlike in most species, the male frog is larger than the female frog. The skin of the dorsum is green in color with dark brown and black marks. The flanks have some orange color. The hidden areas of the four limbs are orange-brown in color. The belly is metallic-tan in color.

== Habitat ==
This frog lives on mountains in cloud forests and scrubland. It has been seen on the steep slopes of the Andes mountains, where alder trees, shrubs, mosses, lycophites, and lichens grow. Scientists have seen the frog between 2,000 m (6,600 ft) and 3,300 m (10,800 ft) above sea level.

Scientists have seen the frog in a protected place, Manu National Park.

== Reproduction ==
The male frog perches on grass, trees, or arboreal or terrestrial bromeliads and calls to the female frogs. The female frog carries her eggs in a pouch on her back. The young emerge out as small froglets with no free-swimming tadpole stage. Scientists reported one female with eight eggs in her pouch at one time. Scientists reported another female from whom 17 froglets emerged at one time.

== Threats ==
The IUCN classifies this frog as endangered. Scientists noted a significant population decline from the 1990s and early 2000s, which is consistent from chytridiomycosis-induced declines in other South American amphibian species. Scientists have detected the causitive fungus, Batrachochytrium dendrobatidis, on some frogs and concluded that G. nebulanastes is susceptible to it.
