= Gastrotheca bufona =

Conservation status
- Vulnerable (IUCN 3.1)

Scientific classification
- Kingdom: Animalia
- Phylum: Chordata
- Class: Amphibia
- Order: Anura
- Family: Hemiphractidae
- Genus: Gastrotheca
- Species: G. bufona

Binomial name
- Gastrotheca bufona Cochran and Goin, 1970

Species of frog

Gastrotheca bufona (common name: Antioquia marsupial frog) is a species of frog in the family Hemiphractidae. It is endemic to Colombia and known from the Cordillera Central and Cordillera Occidental in Antioquia and Caldas Departments, at elevations of 1,430–2,200 m (4,690–7,220 ft) asl. The specific name bufona is derived from Spanish bufón, meaning a jester or clown, and refers to the frog's "gaudy" appearance.

== Description ==
The holotype, an adult male, measured 55 mm (2.2 in) in snout–vent length. The upper eyelids bear characteristic hornlike structures, triangular fleshy appendages. Also the heels have well-developed dermal appendages. Body is somewhat elongate with skin of upper parts of the body being coarse and glandular.

== Reproduction ==
The female frog carries her eggs in a pounch on her back. This species breeds through direct development: The young emerge as small froglets, not tadpoles.

== Habitat and conservation ==
The natural habitat of Gastrotheca bufona is primary Andean cloud forest. It lives in the canopy. It is a rare species threatened by habitat loss caused by agriculture and logging.
