= Gastrotheca megacephala =

Conservation status
- Least Concern (IUCN 3.1)

Scientific classification
- Kingdom: Animalia
- Phylum: Chordata
- Class: Amphibia
- Order: Anura
- Family: Hemiphractidae
- Genus: Gastrotheca
- Species: G. megacephala

Binomial name
- Gastrotheca megacephala Izecksohn, Carvalho-e-Silva, and Peixoto, 2009

Synonyms
- Gastrotheca (Eotheca) megacephala Izecksohn, Carvalho-e-Silva, and Peixoto, 2009; Eotheca megacephala (Izecksohn, Carvalho-e-Silva, and Peixoto, 2009)

Species of frog

Gastrotheca megacephala is a species of frog in the family Hemiphractidae. It lives in Brazil.

== Habitat ==
The frog is found the Caatinga and Atlantic forest biomes. It has been seen in dry forests and scrubland, near bromeliads.

Scientists have report the frog between 15 m (49 ft) and 874 m (2,867 ft) above sea level.

Scientists have reported this frog in protected areas, including APA Baia de Camamu, APA de Setiba, APA do Pratigi, ESEC Ilha do Lameirao, and REVIS de Una.

== Reproduction ==
The female frog carries her eggs in a pouch on her back. The young emerge as froglets, with no free-swimming tadpole stage. The froglets develop in bromeliad plants.

== Threats ==
The IUCN classifies this species as least concern of extinction. What threat it faces comes from habitat loss associated with urbanization, agriculture, silviculture, and cattle raising. People also collect ornamental bromeliads, which can affect the frog.

== Original description ==
- Izecksohn E; Carvalho-E-Silva SPD; Peixoto OL (2009). "Sobre Gastrotheca fissipes (Boulenger, 1888), com a descricao de uma nova especie (Amphibia, Anura, Amphignathodontidae)". Arquivos do Museu Nacional, Rio de Janeiro. 67: 81–91.
