= Gastrotheca flamma =

Conservation status
- Data Deficient (IUCN 3.1)

Scientific classification
- Kingdom: Animalia
- Phylum: Chordata
- Class: Amphibia
- Order: Anura
- Family: Hemiphractidae
- Genus: Gastrotheca
- Species: G. flamma

Binomial name
- Gastrotheca flamma Juncá and Nunes, 2008

Synonyms
- Eotheca flamma (Juncá and Nunes, 2008)

Species of amphibian

Gastrotheca flamma is a species of frog in the family Hemiphractidae. It is endemic to northeastern Brazil and only known from its type locality, Serra da Jibóia in the municipality of Santa Teresinha, Bahia.

== Habitat ==
The only known specimen was collected at 850 m (2,790 ft) above sea level, the highest elevation of Serra da Jibóia.

Scientists found this frog near a protected place: Reserva Particular do Patrimônio Natura Guarirú.

== Taxonomy ==
Scientists are not certain whether this is a unique species or some other frog in Gastrotheca.

== Threats ==
The IUCN classify this species as data deficient. The Serra contains the area's largest stretch of rainforest, but there are farms and pastures at lower elevations, which has caused habitat fragmentation.

== Original description ==
- Junca FA; Nunes I (2008). "A new species of marsupial frog of the genus Gastrotheca Fitzinger (Anura: Amphignathodontidae) from the state of Bahia, northeastern Brazil". Zootaxa. 1907: 61–68.
