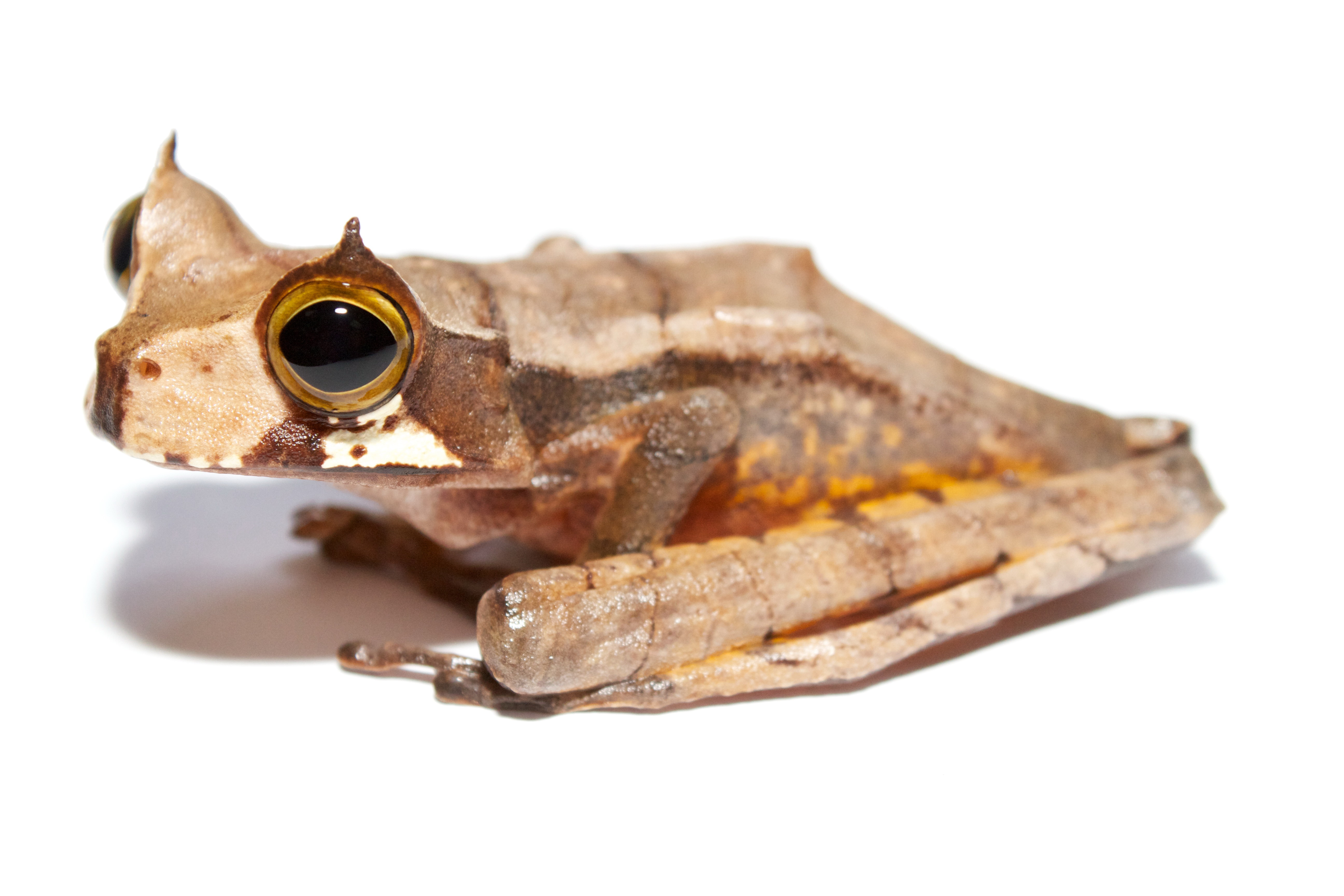
- Gastrotheca cornuta

Scientific classification
- Kingdom: Animalia
- Phylum: Chordata
- Class: Amphibia
- Order: Anura
- Family: Hemiphractidae
- Genus: Gastrotheca; Fitzinger, 1843

Type species
- Hyla marsupiata Duméril and Bibron, 1841

Species
- See text

Synonyms
- Notodelphys Lichtenstein and Weinland, 1854; Nototrema Günther, 1859 "1858"; Opisthodelphys Günther, 1859 "1858"; Amphignathodon Boulenger, 1882; Duellmania Dubois, 1987 "1986"; Eotheca Duellman, 2015; Cryptotheca Duellman, 2015; Australotheca Duellman, 2015; Edaphotheca Duellman, 2015

= Gastrotheca =

Genus of amphibians

Gastrotheca is a genus of frogs in the family Hemiphractidae. They are found in Central America south of Costa Rica and in South America. Most species occur in the American Cordillera from southern Costa Rica to north-western Argentina. This genus makes up the bulk of marsupial frog diversity; formerly it was placed in the "Leptodactylidae" assemblage.

Marsupial frogs are so-called because they possess a dorsal brood pouch. In some species the eggs are fertilized on the female's lower back, and are inserted in her pouch with the aid of the male's toes. The eggs remain in contact with the female's vascular tissue, which provides them oxygen.

Gastrotheca guentheri (Guenther's marsupial frog) is the only known frog with true teeth in its lower jaw. Gastrotheca riobambae (Andean marsupial tree frog) is kept as pet and is used in scientific experiments.

Gastrotheca gemma was additionally discovered in 2021.

== Species ==
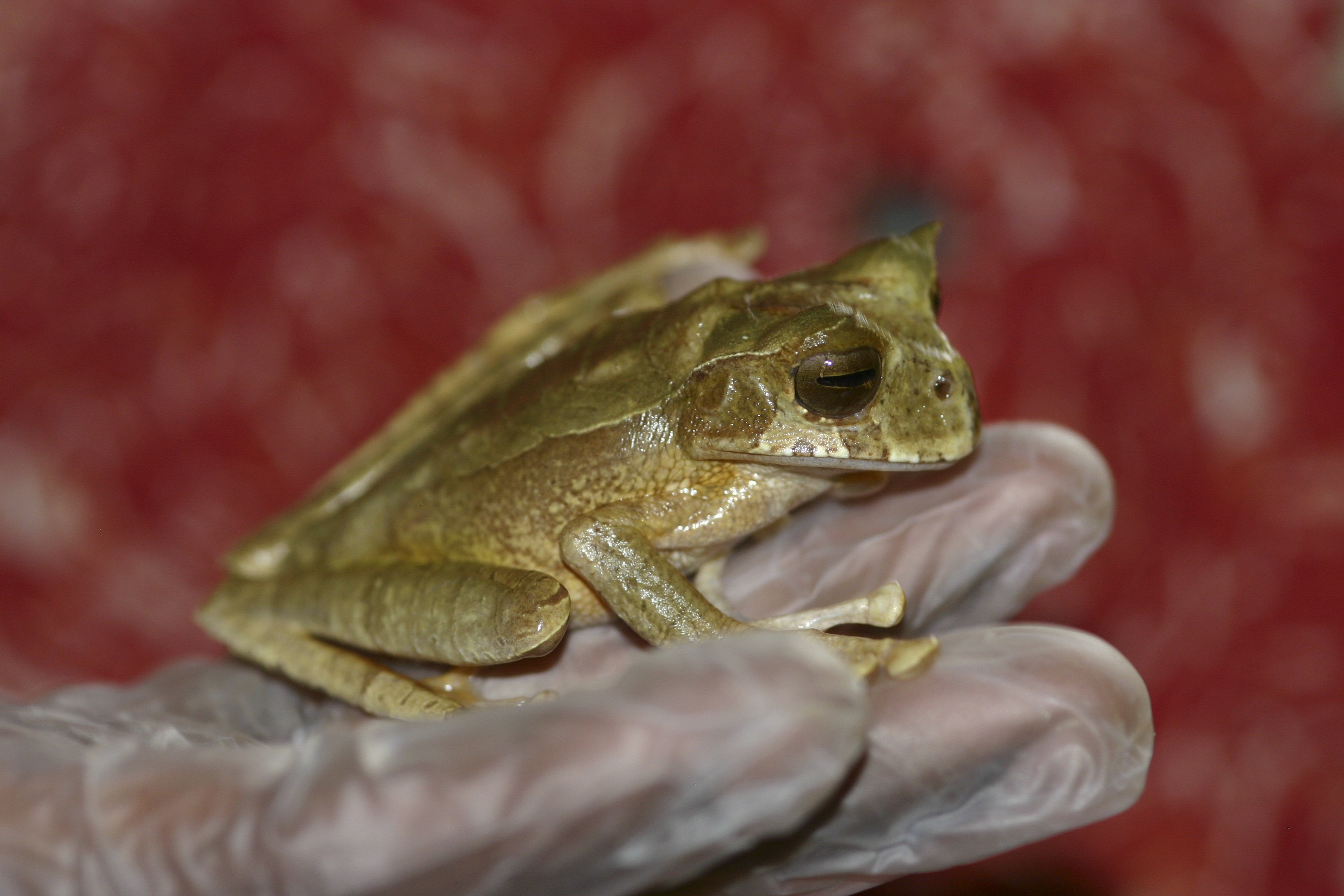
Gastrotheca cornuta

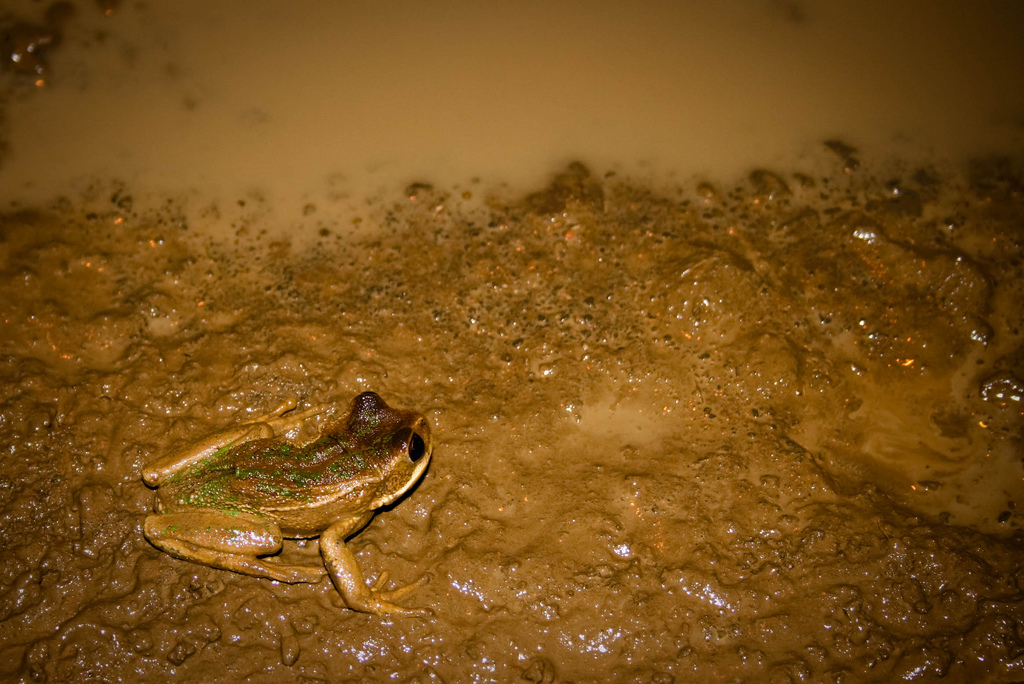
Gastrotheca litonedis

There are 74 species recognized in the genus Gastrotheca:

- Gastrotheca abdita Duellman, 1987
- Gastrotheca aguaruna Duellman, Barley, and Venegas, 2014
- Gastrotheca albolineata (Lutz and Lutz, 1939)
- Gastrotheca andaquiensis Ruiz-Carranza and Hernández-Camacho, 1976
- Gastrotheca angustifrons (Boulenger, 1898)
- Gastrotheca antomia Ruiz-Carranza, Ardila-Robayo, Lynch, and Restrepo-Toro, 1997
- Gastrotheca antoniiochoai (De la Riva and Chaparro, 2005)
- Gastrotheca aratia Duellman, Barley, and Venegas, 2014
- Gastrotheca argenteovirens (Boettger, 1892)
- Gastrotheca atympana Duellman, Lehr, Rodríguez, and von May, 2004
- Gastrotheca aureomaculata Cochran and Goin, 1970
- Gastrotheca bufona Cochran and Goin, 1970
- Gastrotheca carinaceps Duellman, Trueb, and Lehr, 2006
- Gastrotheca christiani Laurent, 1967
- Gastrotheca chrysosticta Laurent, 1976
- Gastrotheca cornuta (Boulenger, 1898)
- Gastrotheca cuencana Carvajal-Endara, Coloma, Morales-Mite, Guayasamin, Székely, and Duellman, 2019
- Gastrotheca dendronastes Duellman, 1983
- Gastrotheca dunni Lutz, 1977
- Gastrotheca dysprosita Duellman, 2013
- Gastrotheca elicioi Carvajal-Endara, Coloma, Morales-Mite, Guayasamin, Székely, and Duellman, 2019
- Gastrotheca ernestoi Miranda-Ribeiro, 1920
- Gastrotheca espeletia Duellman and Hillis, 1987
- Gastrotheca excubitor Duellman and Fritts, 1972
- Gastrotheca fissipes (Boulenger, 1888)
- Gastrotheca flamma Juncá and Nunes, 2008
- Gastrotheca fulvorufa (Andersson, 1911)
- Gastrotheca galeata Trueb and Duellman, 1978
- Gastrotheca gemma Venegas, García Ayachi, Echevarría, Paluh, Chávez-Arribasplata, Marchelie, & Catenazzi, 2021
- Gastrotheca gracilis Laurent, 1969
- Gastrotheca griswoldi Shreve, 1941
- Gastrotheca guentheri (Boulenger, 1882)
- Gastrotheca helenae Dunn, 1944
- Gastrotheca lateonota Duellman and Trueb, 1988
- Gastrotheca lauzuricae (De la Riva, 1992)
- Gastrotheca litonedis Duellman and Hillis, 1987
- Gastrotheca lojana Parker, 1932
- Gastrotheca longipes (Boulenger, 1882)
- Gastrotheca marsupiata (Duméril and Bibron, 1841)
- Gastrotheca megacephala Izecksohn, Carvalho-e-Silva, and Peixoto, 2009
- Gastrotheca microdiscus (Andersson, 1910)
- Gastrotheca mittaliiti (2026)
- Gastrotheca monticola Barbour and Noble, 1920
- Gastrotheca nebulanastes Duellman, Catenazzi, and Blackburn, 2011
- Gastrotheca nicefori Gaige, 1933
- Gastrotheca ochoai Duellman and Fritts, 1972
- Gastrotheca oresbios Duellman and Venegas, 2016
- Gastrotheca orophylax Duellman and Pyles, 1980
- Gastrotheca ossilaginis Duellman and Venegas, 2005
- Gastrotheca ovifera (Lichtenstein and Weinland, 1854)
- Gastrotheca pacchamama Duellman, 1987
- Gastrotheca pachachacae Catenazzi and von May, 2011
- Gastrotheca peruana (Boulenger, 1900)
- Gastrotheca phalarosa Duellman and Venegas, 2005
- Gastrotheca phelloderma Lehr and Catenazzi, 2011
- Gastrotheca piperata Duellman and Köhler, 2005
- Gastrotheca plumbea (Boulenger, 1882)
- Gastrotheca prasina Teixeira, Vechio, Recoder, Carnaval, Strangas, Damasceno, Sena, and Rodrigues, 2012
- Gastrotheca pseustes Duellman and Hillis, 1987
- Gastrotheca psychrophila Duellman, 1974
- Gastrotheca pulchra Caramaschi and Rodrigues, 2007
- Gastrotheca rebeccae Duellman and Trueb, 1988
- Gastrotheca recava Teixeira, Vechio, Recoder, Carnaval, Strangas, Damasceno, Sena, and Rodrigues, 2012
- Gastrotheca riobambae (Fowler, 1913)
- Gastrotheca ruizi Duellman and Burrowes, 1986
- Gastrotheca spectabilis Duellman and Venegas, 2016
- Gastrotheca splendens (Schmidt, 1857)
- Gastrotheca stictopleura Duellman, Lehr, and Aguilar, 2001
- Gastrotheca testudinea (Jiménez de la Espada, 1870)
- Gastrotheca trachyceps Duellman, 1987
- Gastrotheca turnerorum Carvajal-Endara, Coloma, Morales-Mite, Guayasamin, Székely, and Duellman, 2019
- Gastrotheca walkeri Duellman, 1980
- Gastrotheca weinlandii (Steindachner, 1892)
- Gastrotheca williamsoni Gaige, 1922
- Gastrotheca yacuri Carvajal-Endara, Coloma, Morales-Mite, Guayasamin, Székely, and Duellman, 2019
- Gastrotheca zeugocystis Duellman, Lehr, Rodríguez, and von May, 2004

The AmphibiaWeb is listing 69 species as Gastrotheca lojana is not included.
