= Gastrotheca cuencana =

Conservation status
- Endangered (IUCN 3.1)

Scientific classification
- Kingdom: Animalia
- Phylum: Chordata
- Class: Amphibia
- Order: Anura
- Family: Hemiphractidae
- Genus: Gastrotheca
- Species: G. cuencana

Binomial name
- Gastrotheca cuencana Carvajal-Endara, Coloma, Morales-Mite, Guayasamin, Székely, and Duellman, 2019

Species of frog

Gastrotheca cuencana, the Cuenca marsupial frog, is a species of frog in the family Hemiphractidae. It is found in Ecuador.

== Description ==
The adult male frog measures 45.2–53.7 mm in snout-vent length and the adult female frog 49.0–61.6 mm. The skin of the dorsum is yellow-brown in color with black marks along the backbone. The upper surfaces of the feet are yellow-brown in color with gray marks. There is a cream-white canthal line and cream-white lines down the body. The belly and groin are cream-white in color. There is some blue color on the hind legs. The tops of the front toes are cream-white in color. The throat is gray in color. The iris of the eye is rose-bronze in color with black reticulations.

== Etymology ==
Scientists named this frog cuencana for people born in Cuenca, the capital city of Azuay, where the frog was found.

== Habitat ==
This frog is nocturnal and semi-arboreal. It has been found in pastureland, forests, and grassy areas, even within the city. Scientists saw the frog between 2,381 m (7,812 ft) and 3,329 m (10,922 ft) above sea level.

Scientists have reported this frog in a protected place: Parque Nacional Cajas.

== Reproduction ==
This frog has shown some tolerance to habitat disturbance, but it needs clean water to reproduce.

== Threats ==
The IUCN classifies this species as endangered, despite its tolerance to disturbed habitats. Principal threats include habitat loss to in favor of urbanization as Cuenca expands. People also drain the swampland that the frog prefers. Water pollution also poses some threat.
