= Gastrotheca dysprosita =

Conservation status
- Data Deficient (IUCN 3.1)

Scientific classification
- Kingdom: Animalia
- Phylum: Chordata
- Class: Amphibia
- Order: Anura
- Family: Hemiphractidae
- Genus: Gastrotheca
- Species: G. dysprosita

Binomial name
- Gastrotheca dysprosita Duellman, 2013

Synonyms
- Gastrotheca (Duellmania) dysprosita Duellman, 2013

Species of frog

Gastrotheca dysprosita is a species of frog in the family Hemiphractidae. It is endemic to Peru.

== Description ==
The adult male frog measure as much as 60.5 mm in snout-vent length. This frog is distinguished from other species by a has a narrow, black-bordered yellow mediodorsal stripe. The skin of the dorsum is otherwise bright green in color. The flanks are green with yellow fleks. The belly is cream-white with brown spots.

== Habitat ==
Scientists found the frog in elfin forest with epiphytic moss, lichens, and bromeliads. Scientists found the holotype male on a moss-covered cliff in the rain. Scientists saw the frog between 3,370 m (11,060 ft) and 3,440 m (11,290 ft) above sea level.

== Threats ==
The IUCN classifies this species as data deficient. Principal threats appear to be deforestation in favor of agriculture, livestock cultivation, and selective logging.
