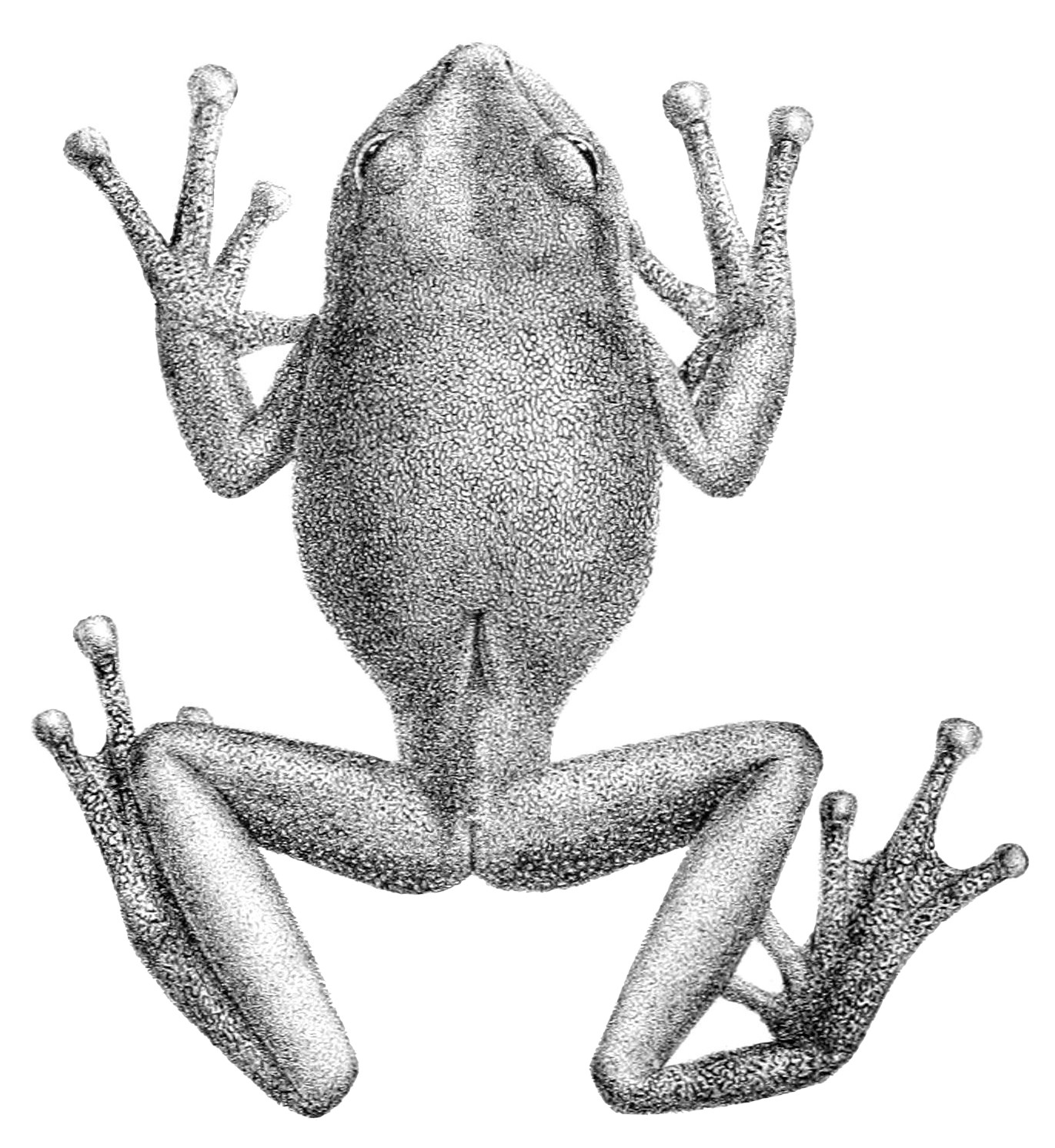
- Gastrotheca plumbea

Conservation status
- Vulnerable (IUCN 3.1)

Scientific classification
- Kingdom: Animalia
- Phylum: Chordata
- Class: Amphibia
- Order: Anura
- Family: Hemiphractidae
- Genus: Gastrotheca
- Species: G. plumbea

Binomial name
- Gastrotheca plumbea (Boulenger, 1882)

= Silver marsupial frog =

Species of amphibian

The silver marsupial frog, plumbeous marsupial frog, or rana marsupial de plumbea (Gastrotheca plumbea) is a species of frog in the family Hemiphractidae. It is endemic to the Pacific slopes of the Andes in northern and central Ecuador.

== Description ==
The adult male frog measures 42.1–61.0 mm long in snout-vent length and the adult female frog 58.2–73.0 mm. The skin of the dorsum is green in color with or without marks. The throat can be light green or yellow-brown in color. There is brown color on the legs with bronze marks. The feet are green or brown in color. The belly is broze or brown or yellow-green during the day and cream-white at night. Where the legs meet the body, thre is bronze and blue or green and blue color during the day and blue by itself at night. The iris of the eye is light olive-green in color.

== Etymology ==
Scientists gave the frog the Latin name plumbeus, for the metal lead, because the holotype appeared lead-gray in color in preservative.

== Habitat ==
This frog is arboreal and nocturnal. It lives in cloud forests but people sometimes see it in secondary forest. Scientists have seen the frog between 1,300 and 3,200 m (4,300 and 10,500 ft)above sea level.

Scientists have reported the frog in protected places: Reserva Ecológica Los Ilinizas, Reserva Ecológica Cotacachi-Cayapas, Estación Científica Río Guajalito, Bosque Protector Mindo-Nambillo, and Bosque Protector Cashca Totoras.

== Reproduction ==
The female frog carries her eggs in a pouch on her back. Scientists have seen 20 to 28 eggs on one female at a time. After 8-10 months, the young emerge as small froglets. This frog is a direct developer with no free-swimming tadpole stage.

== Threats ==
The IUCN classifies this species as vulnerable to extinction. The principal threat is habitat loss associated with agriculture, logging, and cattle cultivation.
