= Gastrotheca angustifrons =

Conservation status
- Critically endangered, possibly extinct (IUCN 3.1)

Scientific classification
- Kingdom: Animalia
- Phylum: Chordata
- Class: Amphibia
- Order: Anura
- Family: Hemiphractidae
- Genus: Gastrotheca
- Species: G. angustifrons

Binomial name
- Gastrotheca angustifrons (Boulenger, 1898)

Species of frog

The thin-snouted marsupial frog, Pacific marsupial frog, or rana marsupial de nariz estrecha (Gastrotheca angustifrons) is a species of frog in the family Hemiphractidae. It is found in Colombia and Ecuador.

== Description ==
The adult male frog measures 56.5–73.2 mm (2.22–2.88 in) in snout-vent length and the adult female frog 63.5–91.8 mm (2.50–3.61 in). The skin of the dosrum is brown, olive-brown, or yellow-brown in color. The belly is white, with or without dark brown marks. There is a white or light yellow mark below the eye. The iris of the eye is light bronze or light olive in color.

== Etymology ==
Scientists gave this frog the Latin name angustus meaning "stretched" and frons meaning "front."

== Habitat ==
This arboreal frog has been found in humid lowland forests. Scientists have seen individuals perched on bushes near streams at night. They know it exclusively from closed forests and no secondary habitats. Scientists have seen the frog between 100 and 600 m (330 and 1,970 ft) above sea level.

== Reproduction ==
The female frog carries her eggs in a pouch on her back. This frog is a direct developer with no free-swimming tadpole stage.

== Threats ==
The IUCN classifies this frog as critically endangered. Principal threats are habitat loss in favor of logging, mining, and illegal farms. The chemicals sprayed on these farms may also harm the frogs. Scientists believe disease may also be responsible for the population decline, but this has yet to be confirmed.
