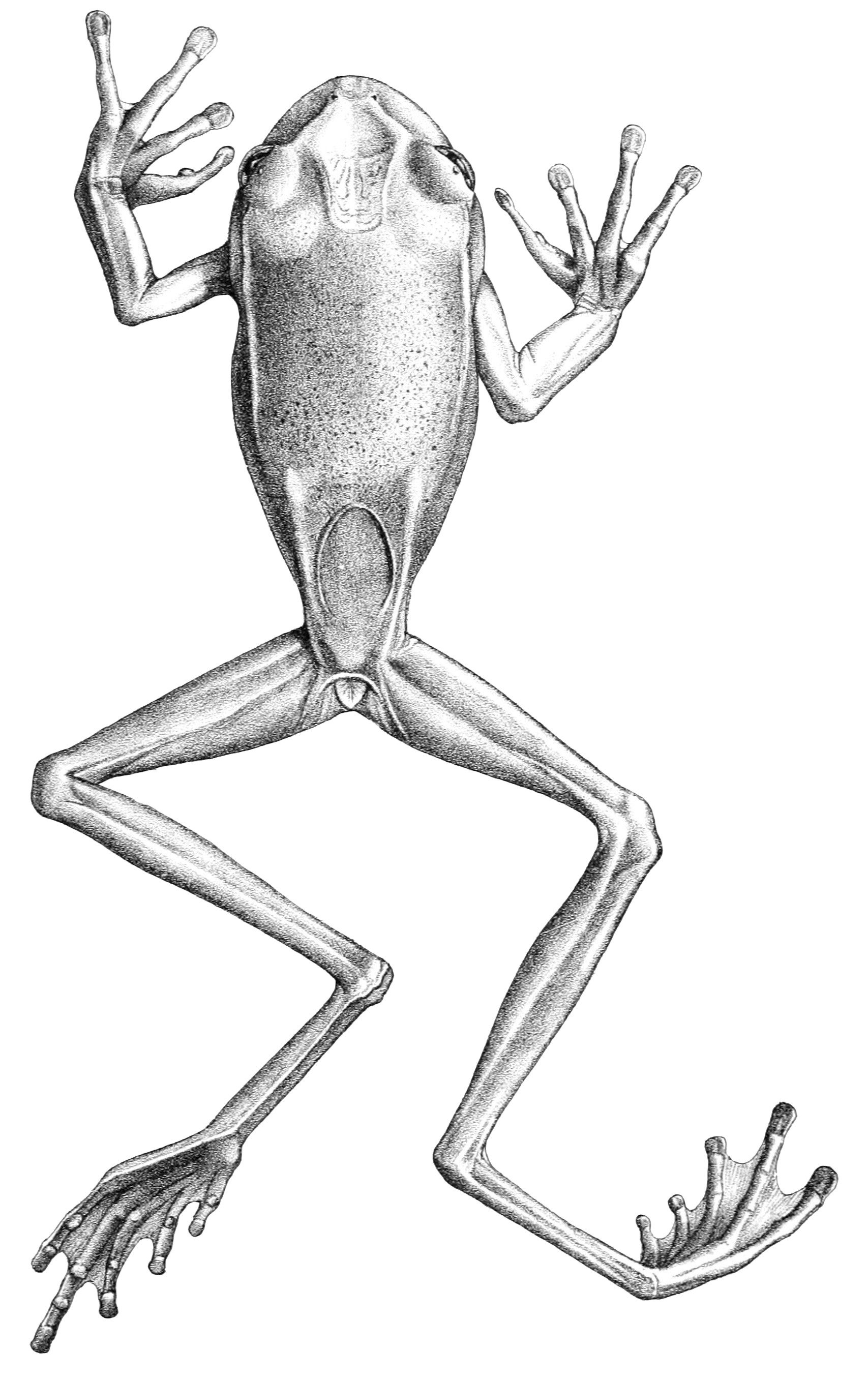

Conservation status
- Least Concern (IUCN 3.1)

Scientific classification
- Kingdom: Animalia
- Phylum: Chordata
- Class: Amphibia
- Order: Anura
- Family: Hemiphractidae
- Genus: Gastrotheca
- Species: G. longipes

Binomial name
- Gastrotheca longipes (Boulenger, 1882)

Synonyms
- Hyla capitocarinata Andersson, 1945

= Gastrotheca longipes =

Species of amphibian

Gastrotheca longipes, also known as the Pastaza marsupial frog, is a species of frog in the family Hemiphractidae. It is found in Ecuador and Peru.

== Description ==
This frog has a large, robust body. The adult male frog measures 61.2–70.8 mm in snout-vent length and the adult female frog 70.0–88.3 mm. The skin of the dorsum and flanks is green with some white marks. Some frogs have brown or white color near the eyes and jaw. The upper lip is white and the lower lip is green. The legs are green with white marks. The bottoms of the feet are green in color. The frog's leg bones are green in color. The knees have brown marks on them. The throat and chest are cream-yellow in color. The belly is cream-white or green with cream-white marks. The iris of the eye is white with brown reticulations.

== Nomenclature ==
Scientists gave this frog the Latin name longipes from longus for "long" and pes for "feet."

== Habitat ==
This canopy-dwelling frog has been seen night on bushes and trees. It has not shown tolerance to habitat disturbance. Scientists have seen the frog between 185 and 954 m (607 and 3,130 ft) above sea level.

Scientists have seen the frog in protected places: Santiago-Comaina Reserved Zone of Peru and Ecuador, Tiputini Biodiversity Station, and Yasuní National Park.

== Reproduction ==
The female frog carries her eggs in a pouch on her back. Scientists observed one female with 15 eggs in her pouch and another with 17. The eggs are large for frogs this size, 10.9 mm in diameter. Scientists believe that this frog's tendency toward fewer, larger eggs is related to its direct development reproductive strategy. This frog hatches into a froglet with no free-swimming tadpole stage.

== Threats ==
The IUCN classifies this species as least concern. In some parts of its range, it is subject to habitat loss from selective logging and farming. Scientists once believed that chytridiomycosis, which has killed many other frogs, might pose a threat, but this has come into doubt since 2004.

== Sources ==
- Comparative Toxicogenomics Database: Gastrotheca longipes
- Breathing Space: Gastrotheca longipes
