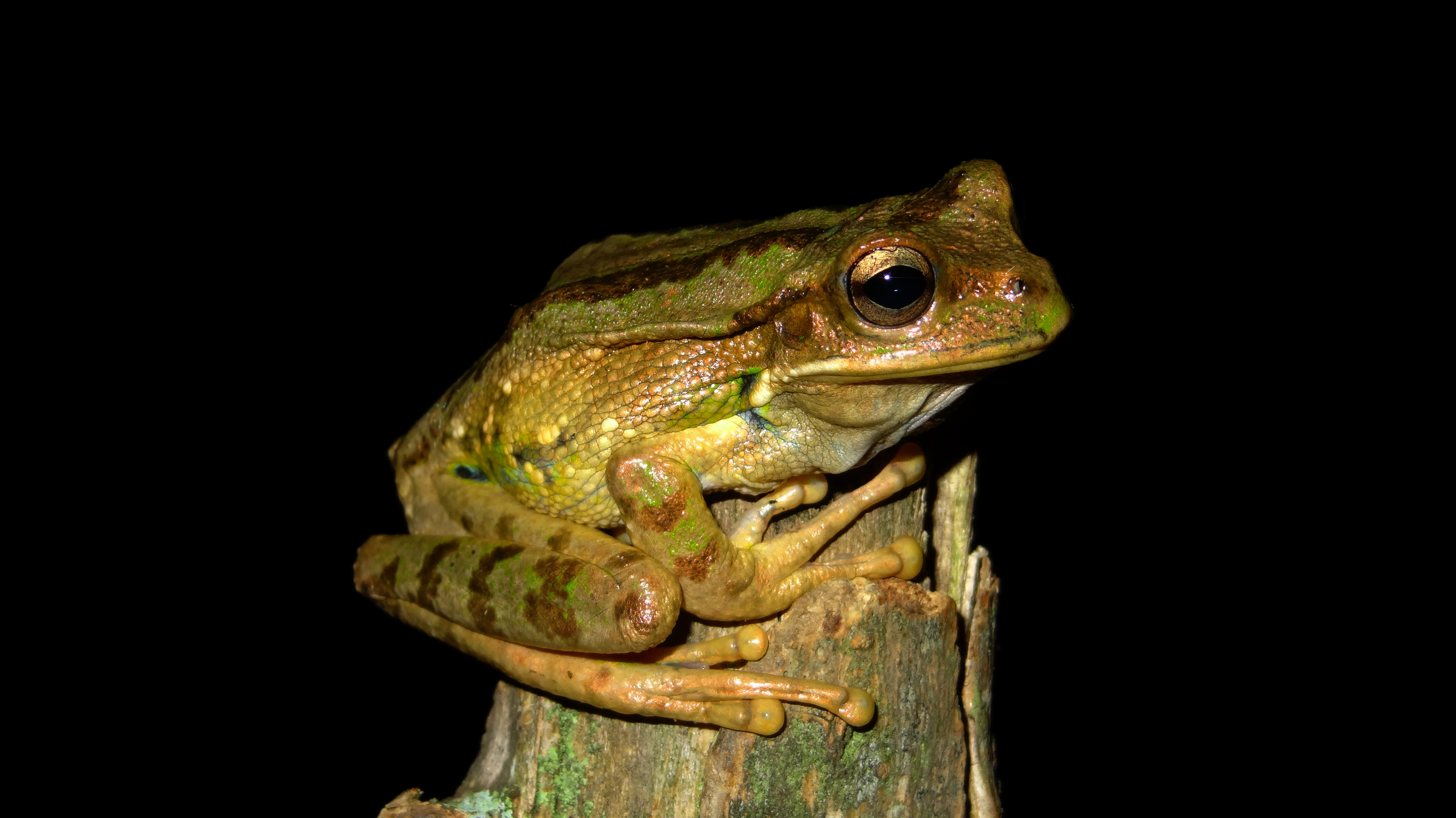

Conservation status
- Least Concern (IUCN 3.1)

Scientific classification
- Kingdom: Animalia
- Phylum: Chordata
- Class: Amphibia
- Order: Anura
- Family: Hemiphractidae
- Genus: Gastrotheca
- Species: G. monticola

Binomial name
- Gastrotheca monticola Barbour and Noble, 1920

= Gastrotheca monticola =

Species of frog

Gastrotheca monticola is a species of frog in the family Hemiphractidae. It is endemic to Peru; records from Ecuador probably refer to other species. Gastrotheca lojana was formerly considered a subspecies of this species, but is now treated as a full species.

Gastrotheca monticola occurs in a range of montane habitats with trees at elevations of 1,900–3,235 m (6,234–10,614 ft) above sea level; it has been recorded shrubs in humid montane tropical forests, arboreal bromeliads, and from a variety of modified habitats (villages, banana and coffee plantations, brush and riparian forest patches within plots of arable land). The female carries the eggs in pouch on her back and deposits the tadpoles in a stream.

It is a common species in northern Peru. It can be locally threatened by habitat loss.
