= List of data deficient amphibians =

- Extinct in the wild (EW): 2 species
- Critically endangered (CR): 825 species
- Endangered (EN): 1,291 species
- Vulnerable (VU): 815 species
- Near threatened (NT): 453 species
- Least concern (LC): 3,733 species
- Data deficient (DD): 896 species
Amphibian species (IUCN, 2025-2)
- 8052 extant species have been evaluated
- 7156 of those are fully assessed (Note: excludes data deficient evaluations.)
- 4186 are not threatened at present (Note: NT and LC.)
- 2931 to 3827 are threatened (Note: Threatened comprises CR, EN and VU. Upper estimate additionally includes DD.)
- 35 to 148 are extinct or extinct in the wild:
  - 37 extinct (EX) species (Note: Chart omits extinct (EX) species)
  - 2 extinct in the wild (EW)

As of December 2025, the International Union for Conservation of Nature (IUCN) lists 896 data deficient amphibian species. 11.1% of all evaluated amphibian species are listed as data deficient.

This is a complete list of data deficient amphibian species and subspecies as evaluated by the IUCN, last substantially updated February 2022. Where possible common names for taxa are given while links point to the scientific name used by the IUCN.

== Caudata ==
Salamanders

=== Hynobiidae ===
Asiatic salamanders

- Chinese hynobiid (Hynobius chinensis)
- Turkestanian salamander (Hynobius turkestanicus)
- Jilin clawed salamander (Onychodactylus zhangyapingi)
- Guizhou salamander (Pseudohynobius guizhouensis)

=== Ambystomatidae ===
Mole salamanders

- Delicate skin salamander (Ambystoma bombypellum)
- Pine woods salamander (Ambystoma silvense)
- Alchachica salamander (Ambystoma subsalsum)

=== Salamandridae ===
True salamanders and newts

- Maolan warty newt (Paramesotriton maolanensis)
- Kachin crocodile newt (Tylototriton kachinorum)
- Ywangan crocodile newt (Tylototriton ngarsuensis)
- Tylototriton panwaensis
- Pasmans' crocodile newt (Tylototriton pasmansi)
- Doi Phu Kha crocodile newt (Tylototriton phukhaensis)
- Sparreboom's crocodile newt (Tylototriton sparreboomi)

=== Plethodontidae ===
Lungless salamanders

- Aura's golden salamander (Bolitoglossa aurae)
- Rio Santa Rosa salamander (Bolitoglossa digitigrada)
- Tapanti climbing salamander (Bolitoglossa epimela)
- Continental divide salamander (Bolitoglossa jugivagans)
- Madeira mushroom-tongue salamander (Bolitoglossa madeira)
- Black web-footed salamander (Bolitoglossa nigrescens)
- Tapantí giant salamander (Bolitoglossa obscura)
- Peru mushroom-tongue salamander (Bolitoglossa peruviana)
- Bolitoglossa psephena
- Robinson's web-footed salamander (Bolitoglossa robinsoni)
- Silverstone's mushroom-tongue salamander (Bolitoglossa silverstonei)
- Splendid web-footed salamander (Bolitoglossa splendida)
- Tico salamander (Bolitoglossa tica)
- Golden shovel-nosed salamander (Desmognathus aureatus)
- Black shovel-nosed salamander (Desmognathus intermedius)
- Blanco blind salamander (Eurycea robusta)
- Southern moss salamander (Nototriton costaricense)
- Cartago worm salamander (Oedipina altura)
- Cerro Grande worm salamander (Oedipina capitalina)
- Collared worm salamander (Oedipina collaris)
- Nimaso worm salamander (Oedipina nimaso)
- El Empalme worm salamander (Oedipina paucidentata)
- Oedipina pseudouniformis
- Stuart's worm salamander (Oedipina stuarti)
- Tellico salamander (Plethodon aureolus)
- Dixie Caverns salamander (Plethodon dixi)
- Blacksburg salamander (Plethodon jacksoni)
- Yellow-spotted woodland salamander (Plethodon pauleyi)
- Savannah slimy salamander (Plethodon savannah)
- Sequoyah slimy salamander (Plethodon sequoyah)
- Hanken's minute salamander (Thorius hankeni)

== Frogs ==
=== Pipidae ===
Tongueless frogs

- Hymenochirus boulengeri
- Hymenochirus feae
- Biafran clawed frog (Xenopus calcaratus)
- Bamiléké clawed frog (Xenopus eysoole)
- Fraser's clawed frog (Xenopus fraseri)
- Kobel's clawed frog (Xenopus kobeli)
- Uganda clawed frog (Xenopus ruwenzoriensis)

=== Megophryidae ===
Litter frogs

- Bijie leaf-litter toad (Leptobrachella bijie)
- Orange-bellied leaf-litter toad (Leptobrachella crocea)
- Twittering litter frog (Leptobrachella fritinniens)
- Leptobrachella mangshanensis
- Mjoberg's dwarf litter frog (Leptobrachella mjobergi)
- Leptobrachella nahangensis
- Natuna Borneo frog (Leptobrachella natunae)
- Nokrek's spadefoot toad (Leptobrachella nokrekensis)
- Midnight litter toad (Leptobrachella nyx)
- Thao Asian toad (Leptobrachella pelodytoides)
- White-headed litter frog (Leptobrachella platycephala)
- Purplish-brown leaf litter toad (Leptobrachella purpurus)
- Purple-bellied leaf litter toad (Leptobrachella purpuraventra)
- Leptobrachella tamdil
- Mt. Wuhuang's leaf litter toad (Leptobrachella wuhuangmontis)
- Yingjiang leaf litter toad (Leptobrachella yingjiangensis)
- Yunkai Mountain's leaf litter toad (Leptobrachella yunkaiensis)
- Leptobrachium kanowitense
- Namdapha horned toadfrog (Megophrys ancrae)
- Inthanon horned toad (Megophrys angka)
- Cao Bang spadefoot toad (Megophrys caobangensis)
- Dawei eyebrow toad (Megophrys daweimontis)
- Leishan horned toad (Megophrys leishanensis)
- Megophrys liboensis
- Megophrys lishuiensis
- Maoson horned frog (Megophrys maosonensis)
- Convex-vented horned toad (Megophrys pachyproctus)
- Concave-crowned horned toad (Megophrys parva)
- Megophrys shuichengensis
- Wawu horned toad (Megophrys wawuensis)
- Weigold's lazy toad (Oreolalax weigoldi)
- Adung lazy toad (Scutiger adungensis)
- Bhutan snow toad (Scutiger bhutanensis)
- Scutiger brevipes
- Tengchong lazy toad (Scutiger tengchongensis)
- Wu's lazy toad (Scutiger wuguanfui)

=== Myobatrachidae ===
Australian toadlets, crowned toadlets, and allies

- Namosado barred frog (Mixophyes hihihorlo)
- Marbled toadlet (Uperoleia marmorata)
- Alexandria toadlet (Uperoleia orientalis)

=== Brachycephalidae ===
Saddleback toads and allies

- Brachycephalus auroguttatus
- Ischnocnema colibri
- Ischnocnema nanahallux
- Ischnocnema pusilla

=== Eleutherodactylidae ===
Robber frogs

- Adelophryne patamona
- Eleutherodactylus verruculatus

=== Craugastoridae ===
Fleshbelly frogs

- Craugastor batrachylus
- Puntarenas robber frog (Craugastor cuaquero)
- Forest robber frog (Craugastor silvicola)
- Iguarasse robber frog (Haddadus plicifer)

=== Strabomantidae ===
Cloud forest landfrogs

- Bryophryne abramalagae
- Bryophryne zonalis
- Holoaden pholeter
- Yellow-spotted Andes frog (Lynchius flavomaculatus)
- Lynchius megacephalus
- Microkayla iani
- Niceforonia aderca
- Niceforonia fallaciosa
- Peru Andes frog (Noblella peruviana)
- Oreobates discoidalis
- Oreobates machiguenga
- Oreobates yanucu
- Phrynopus anancites
- Phrynopus auriculatus
- Phrynopus badius
- Brack's Andes frog (Phrynopus bracki)
- Phrynopus bufoides
- Phrynopus capitalis
- Phrynopus chaparroi
- Phrynopus curator
- Phrynopus interstinctus
- Phrynopus kotosh
- Stone rubber frog (Phrynopus lapidoides)
- Phrynopus lechriorhynchus
- Phrynopus miroslawae
- Phrynopus nicoleae
- Phrynopus oblivius
- Phrynopus paucari
- Phrynopus pesantesi
- Phrynopus tautzorum
- Phrynopus thompsoni
- Unchog robber frog (Phrynopus unchog)
- Phyllonastes duellmani
- Pristimantis ameliae
- Pristimantis amydrotus
- Pristimantis anemerus
- Pristimantis atrabracus
- Pristimantis avius
- Pristimantis bearsei
- Bigheaded rubber frog (Pristimantis boucephalus)
- Pristimantis bustamante
- Valle robber frog (Pristimantis cabrerai)
- Pristimantis caeruleonotus
- Pristimantis chimu
- Conservation land frog (Pristimantis conservatio)
- Pristimantis coronatus
- Pristimantis cuneirostris
- Pristimantis dendrobatoides
- Pristimantis floridus
- Gralarias rainfrog (Pristimantis gralarias)
- Humboldt's rubber frog (Pristimantis humboldti)
- Pristimantis iiap
- Pristimantis infraguttatus
- Pristimantis ixalus
- Pristimantis kirklandi
- Pristimantis leucorrhinus
- Pristimantis loujosti
- Lightspot robber frog (Pristimantis lucidosignatus)
- Pristimantis mariaelenae
- Black-marked robber frog (Pristimantis melanoproctus)
- Pristimantis memorans
- Pristimantis meridionalis
- Pristimantis minutulus
- Mondolfi's robber frog (Pristimantis mondolfii)
- Muñoz’s rainfrog (Pristimantis munozi)
- Huanuco robber frog (Pristimantis nebulosus)
- Onore's robber frog (Pristimantis onorei)
- Pristimantis pataikos
- Peck's robber frog (Pristimantis pecki)
- Pristimantis phalaroinguinis
- Side-striped robber frog (Pristimantis pleurostriatus)
- Pui Pui robber frog (Pristimantis puipui)
- Reticulate robber frog (Pristimantis reticulatus)
- Rivero's robber frog (Pristimantis riveroi)
- Pristimantis royi
- Roze's robber frog (Pristimantis rozei)
- Pristimantis scitulus
- Pristimantis seorsus
- Pristimantis spectabilis
- Pristimantis stictoboubonus
- Pristimantis stipa
- Pristimantis taciturnus
- Pristimantis tanyrhynchus
- Pregonero robber frog (Pristimantis tubernasus)
- Pristimantis turik
- Tobago long-legged palm frog (Pristimantis turpinorum)
- Pristimantis ventriguttatus
- Pristimantis vilcabambae
- Pristimantis wiensi
- Qosqophryne flammiventris
- Strabomantis laticorpus
- Tachiramantis padrecarlosi
- Mercedes' robber frog (Yunganastes mercedesae)

=== Hemiphractidae ===
Marsupial frogs, horned treefrogs, backpack frogs, and allies

- Cryptobatrachus conditus
- Fritziana izecksohni
- Cordillera Colan marsupial frog (Gastrotheca abdita)
- Gastrotheca antoniiochoai
- Gastrotheca carinaceps
- Gastrotheca dysprosita
- Gastrotheca flamma
- Helmeted marsupial frog (Gastrotheca galeata)
- Gunther's marsupial frog (Gastrotheca guentheri)
- La Siberia marsupial frog (Gastrotheca lauzuricae)
- Gastrotheca ossilaginis
- Gastrotheca phalarosa
- Gastrotheca prasina
- Gastrotheca spectabilis
- Schmidt's marsupial frog (Gastrotheca splendens)
- Williamson's marsupial frog (Gastrotheca williamsoni)
- Gastrotheca zeugocystis
- Evan's stefania (Stefania evansi)
- Stefania tamacuarina
- Woodley's stefania (Stefania woodleyi)

=== Hylidae ===
Tree frogs and allies

- Cagua tree frog (Boana alemani)
- Marumbi treefrog (Bokermannohyla langei)
- Charadrahyla tecuani
- Battersby's treefrog (Dendropsophus battersbyi)
- Dendropsophus cerradensis
- Mazaruni tree frog (Dendropsophus grandisonae)
- Dendropsophus limai
- Taperinha treefrog (Dendropsophus minimus)
- Pauini treefrog (Dendropsophus pauiniensis)
- Dendropsophus rhea
- Dendropsophus tapacurensis
- Pearson's slender-legged treefrog (Dryaderces pearsoni)
- Ecnomiohyla phantasmagoria
- Cerro Mali treefrog (Ecnomiohyla thysanota)
- Mimic tree frog (Hyla imitator)
- Colombian backpack frog (Hyla nicefori)
- Zhaoping tree frog (Hyla zhaopingensis)
- South fork treefrog (Isthmohyla xanthosticta)
- Peixoto's snouted tree frog (Oloygon atrata)
- Ololygon goya
- Jureia snouted tree frog (Ololygon jureia)
- Ololygon pombali
- Osteocephalus duellmani
- Sangay casqued treefrog (Osteocephalus sangay)
- Sierra Miahuatlan spikethumb frog (Sarcohyla miahuatlanensis)
- Scinax baumgardneri
- Bolivar snouted tree frog (Scinax danae)
- Werner's Brazilian treefrog (Scinax dolloi)
- Linhares lime treefrog (Sphaenorhynchus palustris)

=== Phyllomedusidae ===
Leaf frogs

- Antioquia leaf frog (Agalychnis danieli)
- Purple and orange leaf frog (Callimedusa duellmani)
- Bokermann's leaf frog (Phrynomedusa bokermann)
- Phyllomedusa neildi

=== Pelodryadidae ===
Australian tree frogs

- Wandolleck's white-lipped tree frog (Litoria albolabris)
- Aru tree frog (Litoria aruensis)
- Kimberley rocket frog (Litoria axillaris)
- Litoria biakensis
- Samlakki tree frog (Litoria capitula)
- Litoria fuscula
- Garman New Guinea tree frog (Litoria jeudii)
- Wendessi tree frog (Litoria longicrus)
- Litoria mareku
- Litoria megalops
- Multi-coloured tree frog (Litoria multicolor)
- Moaif tree frog (Litoria mystax)
- Jobi tree frog (Litoria obtusirostris)
- Northern Pinocchio treefrog (Litoria pinocchio)
- Peppered tree frog (Litoria piperata)
- Pratt's tree frog (Litoria pratti)
- Lined treefrog (Litoria quadrilineata)
- Litoria rara
- Litoria spartacus
- Umar treefrog (Litoria umarensis)
- Baliem River Valley tree frog (Litoria umbonata)
- Wahai tree frog (Litoria vagabunda)
- Vera's treefrog (Litoria verae)
- Litoria wapogaensis
- Litoria wisselensis
- Nyctimystes eucavatus
- Nyctimystes kuduki
- Mountain big-eyed tree frog (Nyctimystes montanus)
- Simbang big-eyed tree frog (Nyctimystes obsoletus)
- Tyler's big-eyed tree frog (Nyctimystes tyleri)

=== Bufonidae ===
True toads

- Amazophrynella gardai
- Ansonia latirostra
- Rio Carauta stubfoot toad (Atelopus carauta)
- Atelopus chirripoensis
- Atelopus dimorphus
- Antado stubfoot toad (Atelopus galactogaster)
- Atelopus guitarraensis
- Atelopus mandingues
- Atelopus reticulatus
- Atelopus siranus
- Walker's stubfoot toad (Atelopus walkeri)
- Menglian stream toad (Bufo menglianus)
- Kemp's Asian tree toad (Bufoides kempi)
- Deception peak mountain toadlet (Capensibufo deceptus)
- Landdroskop mountain toadlet (Capensibufo magistratus)
- Moonlight mountain toadlet (Capensibufo selenophos)
- Dendrophryniscus izecksohni
- Dendrophryniscus krausae
- Dendrophryniscus oreites
- Dendrophryniscus organensis
- Dendrophryniscus skuki
- Dendrophryniscus stawiarskyi
- Nagaland montane torrent toad (Duttaphrynus chandai)
- Kiphire's toad (Duttaphrynus kiphirensis)
- Mamit's toad (Duttaphrynus mamitensis)
- Chandel's toad (Duttaphrynus manipurensis)
- Kolasib's toad (Duttaphrynus mizoramensis)
- Nagaland's toad (Duttaphrynus nagalandensis)
- Scortecci's toad (Duttaphrynus scorteccii)
- Silent Valley toad (Duttaphrynus silentvalleyensis)
- Duttaphrynus sumatranus
- Duttaphrynus totol
- Pulo Weh toad (Duttaphrynus valhallae)
- Wokha's toad (Duttaphrynus wokhaensis)
- Incilius karenlipsae
- Parker's tree toad (Laurentophryne parkeri)
- Melanophryniscus estebani
- Mocquards toad (Mertensophryne mocquardi)
- Nairobi toad (Mertensophryne nairobiensis)
- Mertensophryne schmidti
- Nectophrynoides frontierei
- Nectophrynoides laevis
- Oreophrynella dendronastes
- Damarland pygmy toad (Poyntonophrynus damaranus)
- Mossamedes toad (Poyntonophrynus grandisonae)
- Rhaebo lynchi
- Cochabamba toad (Rhinella ambroensis)
- Rhinella bernardoi
- Carabaya toad (Rhinella fissipes)
- Rhinella gnustae
- Rio Perene toad (Rhinella iserni)
- Rhinella multiverrucosa
- Trueb's beaked toad (Rhinella truebae)
- Buchher's toad (Sclerophrys buchneri)
- Ivory Coast toad (Sclerophrys danielae)
- Sclerophrys djohongensis
- Sclerophrys langanoensis
- Sclerophrys reesi
- Lake Turkana toad (Sclerophrys turkanae)
- Sclerophrys vittata
- Mandailing puppet toad (Sigalegalephrynus mandailinguensis)
- Minangkabau puppet toad (Sigalegalephrynus minangkabauensis)
- Truebella skoptes

=== Aromobatidae ===
Cryptic forest frogs

- Allobates bacurau
- Allobates ornatus
- Peru rocket frog (Allobates peruvianus)
- San Martin rocket frog (Allobates sanmartini)
- Fast singer frog (Allobates velocicantus)
- Anomaloglossus megacephalus
- Parima rocket frog (Anomaloglossus parimae)
- Anomaloglossus parkerae
- Anomaloglossus tepuyensis
- Anomaloglossus triunfo
- Capurí rocket frog (Aromobates capurinensis)
- Lara Andean collared frog (Mannophryne larandina)

=== Dendrobatidae ===
Poison dart frogs

- Niceforo's poison frog (Ameerega ingeri)
- Alto de Buey poison frog (Andinobates altobueyensis)
- Colostethus furviventris
- Colostethus lynchi
- Amazonas rocket frog (Colostethus poecilonotus)
- Rockstone poison dart frog (Dendrobates nubeculosus)
- Ectopoglossus absconditus
- Ectopoglossus astralogaster
- Ectopoglossus saxatilis
- Turquoise-bellied poison frog (Epipedobates espinosai)
- Confusing poison frog (Epipedobates maculatus)
- Nariño poison frog (Epipedobates nariensis)
- Hyloxalus aeruginosus
- Hyloxalus betancuri
- Hyloxalus borjai
- Hyloxalus chlorocraspedus
- Hyloxalus craspedoceps
- Hyloxalus eleutherodactylus
- Hyloxalus excisus
- Puerto Narino rocket frog (Hyloxalus faciopunctulatus)
- Hyloxalus idiomelus
- Hyloxalus leucophaeus
- Hyloxalus mittermeieri
- Gualaceo rocket frog (Hyloxalus parcus)
- Hyloxalus patitae
- Hyloxalus pulcherrimus
- Hyloxalus saltuarius
- Hyloxalus sordidatus
- Hyloxalus spilotogaster
- Hyloxalus utcubambensis
- Finca Primavera rocket frog (Leucostethus alacris)
- Leucostethus dysprosium
- Leucostethus yaguara
- Ranitomeya yavaricola
- Silverstoneia gutturalis
- Silverstoneia minima

=== Leptodactylidae ===
Southern frogs

- Gridi-Papp's terrestrial nest-building frog (Adenomera gridipappi)
- Unforeseen terrestrial nest-building frog (Adenomera inopinata)
- Brown bromeliad frog (Crossodactylodes pintoi)
- Common snouted frog (Edalorhina nasuta)
- Leptodactylus hylodes
- Leptodactylus lauramiriamae
- Leptodactylus ochraceus
- Leptodactylus pascoensis
- Paratelmatobius segallai
- Paratelmatobius yepiranga
- Physalaemus claptoni
- Physalaemus insperatus
- Physalaemus irroratus

=== Centrolenidae ===
Glass frogs

- Santander giant glass frog (Centrolene acathidiocephalum)
- Cordillera azul giant glass frog (Centrolene azulae)
- Rioja giant glass frog (Centrolene lemniscata)
- Centrolene muelleri
- Colombian giant glass frog (Centrolene paezorum)
- Chimerella corleone
- Cochranella phryxa
- Adela's glassfrog (Hyalinobatrachium adespinosai)
- Sarisariñama glass frog (Hyalinobatrachium mesai)
- Hyalinobatrachium muiraquitan
- Humboldt's glassfrog (Nymphargus humboldti)
- Florencia cochran frog (Nymphargus nephelophila)
- Spotted cochran frog (Nymphargus ocellatus)
- Nymphargus vicenteruedai

=== Ceratophryidae ===
Common horned frogs

- Ecuadorian horned frog (Ceratophrys testudo)

=== Odontophrynidae ===
Odontophrynid frogs

- Proceratophrys gladius
- Proceratophrys korekore
- Proceratophrys phyllostomus
- Proceratophrys rondonae

=== Cycloramphidae ===
Button frogs and allies

- Ypiranga button frog (Cycloramphus asper)
- Werner's button frog (Cycloramphus duseni)

=== Alsodidae ===
Spiny-chest frogs and allies

- Alsodes australis
- Alsodes coppingeri
- Alsodes kaweshkari
- Island spiny-chest frog (Alsodes monticola)
- Malleco spiny-chest frog (Alsodes vittatus)

=== Hylodidae ===
Tree toads and allies

- Bocaina big-toothed frog (Phantasmarana bocainensis)
- Jordan button frog (Megaelosia jordanensis)

=== Telmatobiidae ===
Water frogs

- Colan water frog (Telmatobius colanensis)
- Telmatobius degener
- Hall's water frog (Telmatobius halli)
- Hocking's water frog (Telmatobius hockingi)
- Wiens' water frog (Telmatobius necopinus)
- Thompson's water frog (Telmatobius thompsoni)

=== Batrachylidae ===
Patagonia frogs and allies

- Atelognathus ceii
- Las Bayas frog (Atelognathus solitarius)

=== Microhylidae ===
Narrow-mouthed frogs

- Parker's cross frog (Aphantophryne parkeri)
- Danowaria callulops frog (Asterophrys eurydactyla)
- Asterophrys foja
- Asterophrys marani
- Asterophrys pullifer
- Austrochaperina archboldi
- Victoria land frog (Austrochaperina brevipes)
- Austrochaperina kosarek
- Pygmy land frog (Austrochaperina minutissima)
- Austrochaperina parkeri
- Morobe land frog (Austrochaperina polysticta)
- Austrochaperina punctata
- Austrochaperina rudolfarndti
- Cheesman's Papua frog (Barygenys cheesmanae)
- Yellow-throated Papua frog (Barygenys flavigularis)
- Callulops argus
- Boettger's callulops frog (Callulops boettgeri)
- Moluccan callulops frog (Callulops dubius)
- Callulops fojaensis
- Brown callulops frog (Callulops fuscus)
- Warty callulops frog (Callulops glandulosus)
- Kopstein's callulops frog (Callulops kopsteini)
- Callulops marmoratus
- Callulops neuhassi
- Callulops sagittatus
- Callulops yapensis
- Cecilia humming frog (Chiasmocleis bicegoi)
- Central humming frog (Chiasmocleis centralis)
- Chiasmocleis migueli
- Choerophryne allisoni
- Choerophryne amomani
- Arndt's choerophryne (Choerophryne arndtorum)
- Choerophryne nigrescens
- Choerophryne rhenaurum
- Warty rainforest frog (Choerophryne tubercula)
- Common rainforest frog (Choerophryne variegata)
- Cophixalus bewaniensis
- Dayman rainforest frog (Cophixalus daymani)
- Cophixalus monosyllabus
- Mountain rainforest frog (Cophixalus montanus)
- Cape York frog (Cophixalus peninsularis)
- Cophixalus pictus
- Cophixalus pulchellus
- Cophixalus rajampatensis
- Cophixalus salawatiensis
- Tagula rainforest frog (Cophixalus tagulensis)
- Cophixalus tetzlaffi
- Cophixalus tridactylus
- Copiula exspectata
- Copiula major
- Copiula obsti
- Colombian egg frog (Ctenophryne minor)
- Arau Archipelago frog (Hylophorbus infulatus)
- Hylophorbus rufescens
- Bario sticky frog (Kalophrynus barioensis)
- Indonesian grainy frog (Kalophrynus bunguranus)
- Kalophrynus eok
- Robinson's grainy frog (Kalophrynus robinsoni)
- Golden burrowing frog (Kaloula aureata)
- Wide-disked narrow-mouthed frog (Kaloula latidisca)
- Nonggang narrow-mouthed frog (Kaloula nonggangensis)
- Northeast Indian paddy frog (Micryletta aishani)
- Menglien dwarf sticky frog (Micryletta menglienica)
- Orange-bellied narrow-mouth frog (Microhyla aurantiventris)
- Darevsky's narrow-mouth frog (Microhyla darevskii)
- Darrel's chorus frog (Microhyla darreli)
- Arunachal chorus frog (Microhyla eos)
- Burrowing narrow-mouth frog (Microhyla fodiens)
- Irrawaddy narrow-mouth frog (Microhyla irrawaddy)
- Mangaluru narrow-mouthed frog (Microhyla kodial)
- Spotted narrow-mouthed frog (Microhyla maculifera)
- Tiny narrow-mouth frog (Microhyla minuta)
- Painted rice frog (Microhyla picta)
- Tarai narrow-mouthed frog (Microhyla taraiensis)
- No-thumb pigmy frog (Nanohyla nanapollexa)
- Oninia senglaubi
- Oreophryne alticola
- Nestfern frog (Oreophryne aspenicola)
- Black-throated cross frog (Oreophryne atrigularis)
- Lake Habbema cross frog (Oreophryne brevicrus)
- Oreophryne choerophrynoides
- Noisy cross frog (Oreophryne clamata)
- Irian Jaya cross frog (Oreophryne flava)
- Horst's cross frog (Oreophryne frontifasciata)
- Oreophryne geminus
- Oreophryne habbemensis
- Moroka cross frog (Oreophryne kampeni)
- Oreophryne loriae
- Oreophryne mertoni
- Doppelgänger cross frog (Oreophryne pseudasplenicola)
- Oreophryne roedeli
- Oreophryne sibilans
- Oreophryne terrestris
- Oreophryne unicolor
- Waira cross frog (Oreophryne waira)
- Oreophryne wapoga
- Wolterstoff's cross frog (Oreophryne wolterstoffi)
- Paedophryne oyatabu
- Betsileo giant treefrog (Platypelis cowanii)
- Grandidier's rain frog (Scaphiophryne obscura)
- Sphenophryne coggeri
- Sphenophryne rubra
- Sphenophryne similis
- Stumpffia megsoni
- Tay Nguyen dwarf frog (Vietnamophryne inexpectata)
- Chiang Rai dwarf frog (Vietnamophryne occidentalis)
- Orlov's dwarf frog (Vietnamophryne orlovi)
- Xenorhina adisca
- Fly River fanged frog (Xenorhina anorbis)
- Xenorhina arndti
- Xenorhina brachyrhyncha
- Eipomek snouted frog (Xenorhina eiponis)
- Giant fanged frog (Xenorhina gigantea)
- Morobe fanged frog (Xenorhina huon)
- Xenorhina lanthanites
- Xenorhina macrodisca
- Hatam fanged frog (Xenorhina ophiodon)
- Indonesian fanged frog (Xenorhina scheepstrai)
- Lae fanged frog (Xenorhina subcrocea)
- Xenorhina varia

=== Brevicipitidae ===
Rain frogs

- Branch's rain frog (Breviceps branchi)

=== Hemisotidae ===
Shovelnose frogs

- Barotse piglet frog (Hemisus barotseensis)
- De Witte's snout-burrower (Hemisus wittei)

=== Hyperoliidae ===
African reed frogs

- Lindholm's banana frog (Afrixalus lindholmi)
- Schneider's banana frog (Afrixalus schneideri)
- Upemba spiny reed frog (Afrixalus upembae)
- Robust reed frog (Congolius robustus)
- Cryptothylax minutus
- Hyperolius acuticephalus
- Hyperolius albofrenatus
- Hyperolius atrigularis
- Two-colored reed frog (Hyperolius bicolor)
- Hyperolius brachiofasciatus
- Chela Mountain reed frog (Hyperolius chelaensis)
- Hyperolius diaphanus
- Hyperolius ferrugineus
- Friedemanni's long reed frog (Hyperolius friedemanni)
- Brown-throated reed frog (Hyperolius fuscigula)
- Hyperolius ghesquieri
- Loanda reed frog (Hyperolius gularis)
- Hyperolius houyi
- Hyperolius inornatus
- Jackie's reed frog (Hyperolius jackie)
- Jacobsen's long reed frog (Hyperolius jacobseni)
- Shaba reed frog (Hyperolius kibarae)
- Landana reed frog (Hyperolius lucani)
- Lupiro long reed frog (Hyperolius lupiroensis)
- Cabinda reed frog (Hyperolius maestus)
- Hyperolius obscurus
- Hyperolius papyri
- Tshimbulu reed frog (Hyperolius polli)
- Rochebrune's reed frog (Hyperolius protchei)
- Hyperolius pustulifer
- Hyperolius quadratomaculatus
- Volcano reed frog (Hyperolius raveni)
- African reed frog (Hyperolius rhizophilus)
- Omaniundu reed frog (Hyperolius sankuruensis)
- Sheldrick's reed frog (Hyperolius sheldricki)
- Hyperolius stenodactylus
- Hyperolius tornieri
- Luita river reed frog (Hyperolius vilhenai)
- Hyperolius xenorhinus
- Kassina wazae

=== Arthroleptidae ===
Screeching frogs

- Arthroleptis bivittatus
- Arthroleptis brevipes
- Cambondo screeching frog (Arthroleptis carquejai)
- Beautiful squeaker (Arthroleptis formosus)
- Arthroleptis hematogaster
- Arthroleptis loveridgei
- Mosso screeching frog (Arthroleptis mossoensis)
- Mount Nimba screeching frog (Arthroleptis nimbaensis)
- Lomami screeching frog (Arthroleptis phrynoides)
- Tanganyika screeching frog (Arthroleptis spinalis)
- Rainforest screeching frog (Arthroleptis tuberosus)
- Mwana screeching frog (Arthroleptis vercammeni)
- Zimmer's screeching frog (Arthroleptis zimmeri)
- Cardioglossa inornata
- Gbanga forest tree frog (Leptopelis bequaerti)
- Musole forest tree frog (Leptopelis brevipes)
- Leptopelis crystallinoron
- Zaire forest tree frog (Leptopelis fenestratus)
- Mokanga forest tree frog (Leptopelis fiziensis)
- Congulu forest tree frog (Leptopelis jordani)
- Nyonga forest tree frog (Leptopelis lebeaui)
- Quissange forest tree frog (Leptopelis marginatus)
- Kanole forest tree frog (Leptopelis parvus)

=== Ptychadenidae ===
Grassland frogs

- Angola ornate frog (Hildebrandtia ornatissima)
- Ptychadena arnei
- Ptychadena boettgeri
- Hot springs grass frog (Ptychadena filwoha)
- Harenna forest grass frog (Ptychadena harenna)
- Ptychadena ingeri
- Mapacha glass frog (Ptychadena mapacha)
- Ptychadena pujoli
- Ptychadena submascareniensis
- Ptychadena wadei

=== Phrynobatrachidae ===
Puddle frogs

- Phrynobatrachus albifer
- Phrynobatrachus albomarginatus
- Phrynobatrachus anotis
- Ahl's screaming frog (Phrynobatrachus brevipalmatus)
- Phrynobatrachus brongersmai
- Phrynobatrachus congicus
- Phrynobatrachus cryptotis
- Phrynobatrachus dalcqi
- Phrynobatrachus elberti
- Phrynobatrachus gastoni
- Phrynobatrachus giorgii
- Phrynobatrachus hieroglyphicus
- Largen's dwarf puddle frog (Phrynobatrachus inexpectatus)
- Phrynobatrachus kakamikro
- Mayoko puddle frog (Phrynobatrachus mayokoensis)
- Phrynobatrachus nanus
- Ogowe river frog (Phrynobatrachus ogoensis)
- Ruwenzori river frog (Phrynobatrachus petropedetoides)
- Phrynobatrachus pygmaeus
- Phrynobatrachus rainerguentheri
- Phrynobatrachus rouxi
- Ruth Beate's puddle frog (Phrynobatrachus ruthbeateae)
- Phrynobatrachus sternfeldi
- Phrynobatrachus taiensis

=== Petropedetidae ===
African torrent frogs

- Parker's water frog (Petropedetes parkeri)

=== Pyxicephalidae ===
Box-headed frogs

- Katanga metal frog (Cacosternum leleupi)
- Strongylopus kilimanjaro
- Damaraland sand frog (Tomopterna ahli)
- Mali screeching frog (Tomopterna milletihorsini)
- Tomopterna monticola

=== Nyctibatrachidae ===
Robust frogs

- Starry dwarf frog (Astrobatrachus kurichiyana)
- Manalar night frog (Nyctibatrachus manalari)
- Mewa Singh's night frog (Nyctibatrachus mewasinghi)
- Radcliffe's night frog (Nyctibatrachus radcliffei)
- Robin Moore's night frog (Nyctibatrachus robinmoorei)
- Shiradi night frog (Nyctibatrachus shiradi)

=== Ceratobatrachidae ===
Wrinkled ground frogs and allies
- Cornufer adiastolus
- Cornufer bimaculatus
- Cornufer bufonulus
- Cornufer caesiops
- Bougainville sticky-toed frog (Cornufer gigas)
- Numundo wrinkled ground frog (Cornufer mimicus)
- Cornufer paepkei
- Cornufer sulcatus
- Cornufer wuenscheorum
- Himalayan papilla-tongued frog (Liurana himalayana)
- Indian papilla-tongued frog (Liurana indica)
- Minute papilla-tongued frog (Liurana minuta)
- Valley papilla-tongued frog (Liurana vallecula)
- Platymantis bayani
- Platymantis quezoni

=== Ranixalidae ===
Leaping frogs

- Bhadra leaping frog (Indirana bhadrai)
- Kempholey bubble-nest frog (Indirana longicrus)
- Muduga Mountain leaping frog (Walkerana muduga)

=== Dicroglossidae ===
Fork-tongued frogs

- Fejervarya pulla
- Reticulate eastern frog (Ingerana reticulata)
- Coffee fanged frog (Limnonectes coffeatus)
- Broad-headed creek frog (Limnonectes conspicillatus)
- Manipur frog (Limnonectes ghoshi)
- Khammouan fanged frog (Limnonectes khammonensis)
- Limnonectes kong
- Longchuan big-headed frog (Limnonectes longchuanensis)
- Mawlindip frog (Limnonectes mawlyndipi)
- Limnonectes micrixalus
- Limnonectes mocquardi
- Short-webbed frog (Minervarya brevipalmata)
- Minervarya dhaka
- Kadar burrowing frog (Minervarya kadar)
- Jog Krishnan cricket frog (Minervarya krishnan)
- Minervarya marathi
- Neil Cox's burrowing frog (Minervarya neilcoxi)
- Arnold's paa frog (Nanorana arnoldi)
- Cona paa frog (Nanorana conaensis)
- Kakhien paa frog (Nanorana feae)
- Mokokchung frog (Nanorana mokokchungensis)
- Nanorana phrynoides
- Rare paa frog (Nanorana rarica)
- Quasipaa courtoisi
- Rao's burrowing frog (Sphaerotheca leucorhynchus)
- Jerdon's burrowing frog (Sphaerotheca pluvialis)
- Pakistan bullfrog (Sphaerotheca strachani)

=== Rhacophoridae ===
Shrub frogs

- Karin hills bushfrog (Gracixalus cariensis)
- Jinxiu bubble-nest frog (Gracixalus jinxiuensis)
- Medog bubble-nest frog (Gracixalus medogensis)
- Tianlin small tree frog (Gracixalus tianlinensis)
- Kurixalus berylliniris
- Gracile frilled tree frog (Kurixalus gracilloides)
- Kurixalus wangi
- Sumatran sharp-nosed tree frog (Leptomantis pseudacutirostris)
- Liuixalus shiwandashan
- Medog ridged-nose treefrog (Nasutixalus medogensis)
- Philautus cinerascens
- Darjeeling bubble-nest frog (Philautus dubius)
- Kemp's bush frog (Philautus kempii)
- Maoson shrub frog (Philautus maosonensis)
- Peters' bubble-nest frog (Philautus petersi)
- Triangle bubble-nest frog (Philautus tytthus)
- Brown blotched Bengal tree frog (Polypedates bengalensis)
- Polypedates chlorophthalmus
- Samara flying frog (Polypedates hecticus)
- Subansiri's tree frog (Polypedates subansiriensis)
- Narayanghat whipping frog (Polypedates zed)
- Fast-calling shrub frog (Raorchestes drutaahu)
- Garo Hills bubble-nest frog (Raorchestes garo)
- Kakkayam shrub frog (Raorchestes kakkayamensis)
- Lechiyappan's bush frog (Raorchestes lechiya)
- White groin bush frog (Raorchestes leucolatus)
- Leimatak's bush frog (Raorchestes manipurensis)
- Ravi's bush frog (Raorchestes ravii)
- Reza Khan's bush frog (Raorchestes rezakhani)
- Sahai bush frog (Raorchestes sahai)
- Sanjappa's shrub frog (Raorchestes sanjappai)
- Thoda bush frog (Raorchestes thodai)
- Silver-eyed shrub frog (Raorchestes vellikkannan)
- Hoa Binh treefrog (Rhacophorus hoabinhensis)
- Laoshan treefrog (Rhacophorus laoshan)
- Cao Bang treefrog (Rhacophorus larissae)
- Rhacophorus rhyssocephalus
- Subansiri bush frog (Rhacophorus subansiriensis)
- Warty flying frog (Rhacophorus tuberculatus)
- Htingnan flying frog (Rhacophorus turpes)
- Green-spotted treefrog (Rhacophorus viridimaculatus)
- Rohanixalus marginis
- Rohanixalus punctatus
- Anna's mossy frog (Theloderma annae)
- Lake bug-eyed frog (Theloderma lacustrinum)
- Nagaland treefrog (Theloderma nagalandense)
- Frank's tree frog (Zhangixalus franki)
- White-striped treefrog (Zhangixalus leucofasciatus)
- Zhangixalus lishuiensis
- Pinglong tree frog (Zhangixalus pinglongensis)
- Anhui tree frog (Zhangixalus zhoukaiyae)

=== Mantellidae ===
Mantellid frogs

- Ambohimitombi Madagascar frog (Mantidactylus ambohimitombi)
- Wakea madinika

=== Ranidae ===
True frogs

- Adi cascade frog (Amolops adicola)
- Akha torrent frog (Amolops akhaorum)
- Doi Inthanon rock frog (Amolops archotaphus)
- Amolops chayuensis
- Iridescent torrent frog (Amolops iriodes)
- Kaulback's torrent frog (Amolops kaulbacki)
- Kohima spiny torrent frog (Amolops kohimaensis)
- Kambaiti sucker frog (Amolops longimanus)
- Amolops mengdingensis
- Amolops mengyangensis
- Nepal sucker frog (Amolops nepalicus)
- Spotted stinky torrent frog (Amolops nidorbellus)
- Shuicheng torrent frog (Amolops shuichengicus)
- Amolops wenshanensis
- Toungoo frog (Humerana oatesii)
- Chitwan frog (Hylarana chitwanensis)
- Pic de Fon white-lipped frog (Hylarana fonensis)
- Garo Hills frog (Hylarana garoensis)
- Irrawaddy frog (Hylarana margariana)
- Congolo frog (Hylarana parkeriana)
- Sumatra frog (Hylarana persimilis)
- Lemos-Espinal's leopard frog (Lithobates lemosespinali)
- Large-eyed torrent frog (Meristogenys macrophthalmus)
- Odorrana leporipes
- Odorrana macrotympana
- Mawphlang wart frog (Odorrana mawphlangensis)
- Mount Jerai frog (Odorrana monjerai)
- Mutschmann's frog (Odorrana mutschmanni)
- Odorrana sinica
- Papurana aurata
- Went Mountains frog (Papurana grisea)
- Pelophylax demarchii
- Battak frog (Pulchrana debussyi)
- Pulchrana guttmani
- Papahag frog (Pulchrana melanomenta)
- Culai brown frog (Rana culaiensis)
- Dabie Mountain brown frog (Rana dabieshanensis)
- Jiemuxi brown frog (Rana jiemuxiensis)
- Rana luanchuanensis
- Rana qianjiang

== Gymnophiona ==
Caecilians

=== Rhinatrematidae ===
- Eastern Peru caecilian (Epicrionops lativittatus)
- Marbled caecilian (Epicrionops marmoratus)
- Marcapata Valley caecilian (Epicrionops peruvianus)

=== Ichthyophiidae ===
- Pointed-headed caecilian (Ichthyophis acuminatus)
- Alfred's striped caecilian (Ichthyophis alfredi)
- Boven Mahakkam caecilian (Ichthyophis asplenius)
- Long Bloee caecilian (Ichthyophis atricollaris)
- Indonesian caecilian (Ichthyophis bernisi)
- Billiton Island caecilian (Ichthyophis billitonensis)
- Cardamom caecilian (Ichthyophis cardamomensis)
- Cat Loc caecilian (Ichthyophis catlocensis)
- Cha Lo caecilian (Ichthyophis chaloensis)
- Daribok's striped caecilian (Ichthyophis daribokensis)
- Ichthyopis davidi
- Mount Dulit caecilian (Ichthyophis dulitensis)
- Elongated caecilian (Ichthyophis elongatus)
- Garo Hills caecilian (Ichthyophis garoensis)
- Basilan Island caecilian (Ichthyophis glandulosus)
- Humphrey's caecilian (Ichthyophis humphreyi)
- Javan caecilian (Ichthyophis javanicus)
- Khumhzi striped ichthyophis (Ichthyophis khumhzi)
- Koh Tao Island caecilian (Ichthyophis kohtaoensis)
- Upper Laos caecilian (Ichthyophis laosensis)
- Larut Hills caecilian (Ichthyophis larutensis)
- Western Borneo caecilian (Ichthyophis monochrous)
- Manipur moustached caecilian (Ichthyophis moustakius)
- Colorful ichthyophis (Ichthyophis multicolor)
- Kuala Lumpur caecilian (Ichthyophis nigroflavus)
- Nokrek's striped caecilian (Ichthyophis nokrekensis)
- Kapahiang caecilian (Ichthyophis paucidentulus)
- Sendenyu striped Ichthyophis (Ichthyophis sendenyu)
- Singapore caecilian (Ichthyophis singaporensis)
- Sumatran caecilian (Ichthyophis sumatranus)
- Supachai's caecilian (Ichthyophis supachaii)
- Doi Suthep caecilian (Ichthyophis youngorum)
- Gansi caecilian (Uraeotyphlus gansi)
- Kerala caecilian (Uraeotyphlus interruptus)
- Malabar tailed caecilian (Uraeotyphlus malabaricus)
- Menon's caecilian (Uraeotyphlus menoni)
- Bonnacord caecilian (Uraeotyphlus oommeni)
- Red caecilian (Uraeotyphlus oxyurus)

=== Scolecomorphidae ===
- Bornmuller's caecilian (Crotaphatrema bornmuelleri)
- Crotaphatrema tchabalmbaboensis

=== Chikilidae ===
- Darlong chikila

=== Herpelidae ===
- Victoria caecilian (Herpele multiplicata)

=== Caeciliidae ===
- Whitebelly caecilian (Caecilia albiventris)
- Antioquia caecilian (Caecilia antioquiaensis)
- Armored caecilian (Caecilia armata)
- Santa Rosa caecilian (Caecilia attenuata)
- Pensilvania caecilian (Caecilia caribea)
- Solid caecilian (Caecilia corpulenta)
- Normandia caecilian (Caecilia crassisquama)
- Garagoa caecilian (Caecilia degenerata)
- Dunn's caecilian (Caecilia dunni)
- Yellow-spotted caecilian (Caecilia flavopunctata)
- Fundo Sinchona caecilian (Caecilia inca)
- Taylor's Ecuador caecilian (Caecilia subterminalis)
- Guayaquil caecilian (Caecilia tenuissima)
- Yavisa caecilian (Oscaecilia elongata)
- Joinville caecilian (Oscaecilia hypereumeces)
- Quisto cocha caecilian (Oscaecilia koepckeorum)
- Tributary caecilian (Oscaecilia zweifeli)

=== Typhlonectidae ===
- Braestrup's caecilian (Chthonerpeton braestrupi)
- Bahia caecilian (Chthonerpeton exile)
- El Reventador caecilian (Chthonerpeton onorei)
- Minas Gerais caecilian (Chthonerpeton perissodus)
- Chthonerpeton tremembe

=== Indotyphlidae ===
- Periah peak caecilian (Gegeneophis carnosus)
- Goa caecilian (Gegeneophis goaensis)
- Gurupur caecilian (Gegeneophis krishni)
- Mudur caecilian (Gegeneophis madhavai)
- Mhadei caecilian (Gegeneophis mhadeiensis)
- Eastern geg (Gegeneophis orientalis)
- Paresh's gegenophis (Gegeneophis pareshi)
- Malabar cardamom geg (Gegeneophis primus)
- Tejaswini geg (Gegeneophis tejaswini)
- Makumuno Assumbo caecilian (Idiocranium russeli)
- Battersby's caecilian (Indotyphlus battersbyi)
- Maharashtra caecilian (Indotyphlus maharashtraensis)

=== Dermophiidae ===
- Dermophis costaricense
- Dermophis gracilior
- Angel's caecilian (Geotrypetes angeli)
- False angel's caecilian (Geotrypetes pseudoangeli)

=== Siphonopidae ===
- Luetkenotyphlus fredi
- Microcaecilia grandis
- Microcaecilia iwokramae
- Tiny Venezuelan caecilian (Microcaecilia rabei)
- Tiny Brazilian caecilian (Microcaecilia supernumeraria)
- Reinhardt's caecilian (Mimosiphonops reinhardti)
- Worm-patterned caecilian (Mimosiphonops vermiculatus)
- Salvador caecilian (Siphonops leucoderus)

== See also ==
- Lists of IUCN Red List data deficient species
- List of least concern amphibians
- List of near threatened amphibians
- List of vulnerable amphibians
- List of endangered amphibians
- List of critically endangered amphibians
- List of recently extinct amphibians
