= Hildebrandtia macrotympanum =

Conservation status
- Least Concern (IUCN 3.1)

Scientific classification
- Kingdom: Animalia
- Phylum: Chordata
- Class: Amphibia
- Order: Anura
- Family: Ptychadenidae
- Genus: Hildebrandtia
- Species: H. macrotympanum

Binomial name
- Hildebrandtia macrotympanum (Boulenger, 1912)
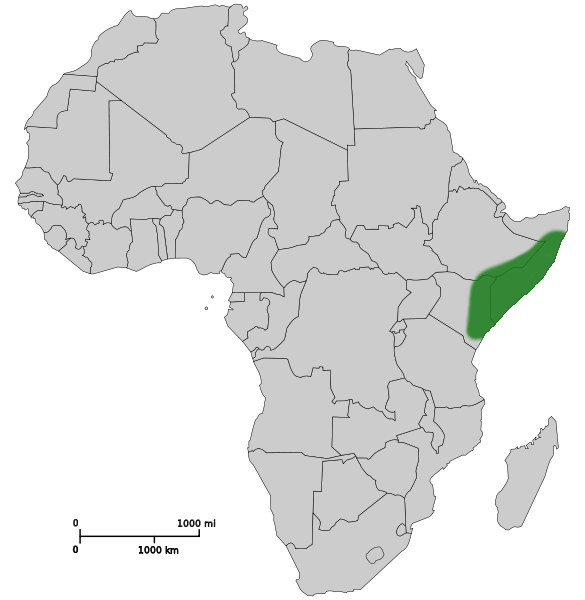
- Distribution of H. macrotympanum

Synonyms
- Pyxicephalus macrotympanum Boulenger, 1912; Rana macrotympanum (Boulenger, 1912); Tomopterna scorteccii Balletto, Cherchi, and Lanza, 1978

Species of frog

Hildebrandtia macrotympanum is a species of frog in the family Ptychadenidae. It is a rarely seen fossorial frog that is found in southern Ethiopia, Kenya, and Somalia. Common names Somali ornate frog, northern ornate frog, and plain burrowing frog have been proposed for it.

== Description ==
Males grow to a snout–vent length of 46 mm (1.8 in) and females to 51 mm (2.0 in). The body is very stocky. The snout is short. The eyes are protruding. The tympanum is large, about the size of the eye or larger. The legs are short and muscular; the toe webbing is basal. Dorsal surfaces are vivid reddish-brown, pale brown, or olive green. Colouration is either uniform or with weal brown mottling. A black or grey band runs from the tip of the snout across the eyes to over the tympanum and to the flanks; the grey flanks are separated from the back by a narrow line. The belly is white or cream; the throat is mottled. Males have paired vocal sacs.

The male advertisement call consists of brief hoots, uttered in rapid succession.

== Habitat and conservation ==
Hildebrandtia macrotympanum is a fossorial species inhabiting arid savanna and semi-desert country at elevations of 550–600 m (1,800–1,970 ft) above sea level. Breeding takes place in temporary pools, and it is likely to be found above ground only during seasonal rains. This makes it a rarely observed species.

Despite apparently being fairly resilient to dry conditions, this species can be threatened by drought, probably preventing it from breeding. It could also be threatened by environmental degradation resulting from human expansion and settlement, impacting the breeding sites. It is present in the Tsavo East National Park in Kenya.
