= Raorchestes sanjappai =

Conservation status
- Data Deficient (IUCN 3.1)

Scientific classification
- Kingdom: Animalia
- Phylum: Chordata
- Class: Amphibia
- Order: Anura
- Family: Rhacophoridae
- Genus: Raorchestes
- Species: R. sanjappai

Binomial name
- Raorchestes sanjappai Garg, Suyesh, Das, Bee & Biju, 2021

Species of frog

Raorchestes sanjappai, the Periya bush frog or Sanjappa's bush frog, is a species of frog in the family Rhacophoridae. It is endemic to India. Scientists have observed it in Periya in the Western Ghat mountains, approximately 750 meters above sea level.

Scientists do not know much about this frog, and its resemblance to other frogs in Raorchestes makes it difficult to determine its two range. Like other frogs in Raorchestes, it breeds through direct development.

== Taxonomy ==
Raorchestes sanjappai was described in 2021 by the herpetologist Sonali Garg and her colleagues based on an adult male specimen collected in Periya, Wayanad district in the Indian state of Kerala. The species is named after M. Sanjappa, an Indian botanist, to honour his taxonomic work and his support of S. D. Biju, one of the herpetologists who described the species.

Raorchestes sanjappai is a member of the Raorchestes chromasynchysi group within its genus and is most closely related to R. vellikkannan.

== Description ==
Raorchestes sanjappai is a small species, with a male snout–vent length of 22–24 mm. The dorsum is uniformly green, without prominent dorsal markings. The dorsal colouration extends onto the dorsal surface of the fore and hindlimbs, and the loreal and tympanic regions. The sides of the body are light brown to yellowish. The throat is light flesh-grey with minute dark spots and the chest and belly are greyish-white. The groin is light brown with yellow markings and posterior part of the thighs is light to dark brown with light greenish spots on the anal region. The limbs are greyish-brown, while the hands and feet are dark grey or blackish. The iris is reddish-brown.

== Distribution and habitat ==
Raorchestes sanjappai is endemic to the Western Ghats and currently known only from an altitude of about 750 m at its type locality of Periya, north of Palghat gap in the Wayanad district of Kerala. The species was observed inside secondary forests and individuals were located on vegetation up to 3 m high during the breeding season.

== Vocalisations ==
Males produce a single type of call. Calls consist of widely spaced pulses. A typical call has a duration of 411.2 ms, with a rise time of 376.2 ms and fall time of 35.1 ms. Two pulses are delivered at a rate of 2.7 pulses/second, and the overall dominant frequency is 2.4 kHz.
