= Lynchius nebulanastes =

Conservation status
- Endangered (IUCN 3.1)

Scientific classification
- Kingdom: Animalia
- Phylum: Chordata
- Class: Amphibia
- Order: Anura
- Clade: Brachycephaloidea
- Family: Craugastoridae
- Genus: Lynchius
- Species: L. nebulanastes

Binomial name
- Lynchius nebulanastes (Cannatella, 1984)

Synonyms
- Phrynopus nebulanastes Cannatella, 1984; Eleutherodactylus nebulanastes (Cannatella, 1984)

Species of frog

Lynchius nebulanastes is a species of frog in the family Strabomantidae. It is endemic to north-western Peru where it is known from the vicinity of its type locality, El Tambo, on the western slope of the Cordillera de Huancabamba, Piura Region. Common name Canchaque Andes frog has been coined for it.

== Description ==
Adult males measure 28–36 mm (1.1–1.4 in) and adult females 33–42 mm (1.3–1.7 in) in snout–vent length. The snout is subacuminate in dorsal view and sloping in lateral profile. The canthus rostralis is sharp and slightly concave. The tympanum is concealed by skin. The supratympanic fold is weakly developed. Skin of dorsum and venter is smooth (dorsal skin occasionally finely areolate. Skin of the post-tympanic region is tuberculate. The fingers have ventral pads, with weak circumferential grooves in fingers I and II only. The toes have discs with weak circumferential grooves. The dorsum is brown, black, or dull green, and may have a creamy yellow line. The throat and belly are greenish yellow and have darker brown or gray markings. The ventral surfaces of the hind limbs are bright yellow. There also are bright yellow spots on the hidden surfaces of groin and hind limbs. The iris is dull bronze.

== Habitat and conservation ==
Lynchius nebulanastes occurs in humid montane forests at elevations of 2,770–2,820 m (9,090–9,250 ft) above sea level; it has been found along forest edges (including roads). It is a terrestrial frog that can be found under rocks. It is threatened by habitat loss caused by agricultural activities.
