= Telmatobius vilamensis =

Conservation status
- Critically Endangered (IUCN 3.1)

Scientific classification
- Kingdom: Animalia
- Phylum: Chordata
- Class: Amphibia
- Order: Anura
- Family: Telmatobiidae
- Genus: Telmatobius
- Species: T. vilamensis

Binomial name
- Telmatobius vilamensis Formas, Benavides, and Cuevas, 2003

Species of frog

Telmatobius vilamensis is a species of frog in the family Telmatobiidae. It is endemic to northern Chile and only known from its type locality, Río Vilama near San Pedro de Atacama. The specific name vilamensis refers to the type locality. It may already be extinct, although it is doubtfully distinct from Telmatobius halli.

== Taxonomy ==
Although described as a distinct species in 2003, multiple studies indicate little divergence between this species, Telmatobius dankoi, and Telmatobius halli. Thus, all three may be conspecific with one another.

== Description ==
Adult males measure 45–51 mm (1.8–2.0 in) and adult females 38–48 mm (1.5–1.9 in) in snout–vent length. The body shape is lean and hydrodynamic. The head is large, broad, and depressed. The snout is subovoid in dorsal view and prominently pointed laterally. No tympanum is present but the supratympanic fold is moderately developed. The fingers have rounded tips and no webbing, but the middle fingers have lateral fringes. The toes have rounded tips and are webbed. The dorsum is dark green with dark brown spots. The venter and throat are white.

The largest tadpoles (Gosner stage 35) are 84 mm (3.3 in) in total length. The maximum body length is 34 mm (1.3 in).

Telmatobius vilamensis is only known from its type locality near San Pedro de Atacama in northern Chile.

== Habitat and conservation ==
The type locality is the Vilama River, a montane river in a semidesert area with scarce vegetation at 2,500 m (8,200 ft) above sea level (3110 m in the original publication). The specimens were collected with a net below aquatic plants on the banks of the river. Tadpoles were found along with the adults.

This species has a very limited known range, within which it is threatened by water pollution caused by mining activities. Additional threats are abstraction of water for human consumption and agriculture, as well as recreational activities. It is not known from any protected areas. In 2016, the only known locality of the species was destroyed in a flash flood on the Vilama River, and it thus may be extinct, although it could be conspecific with T. halli and thus not be a distinct species at all.
