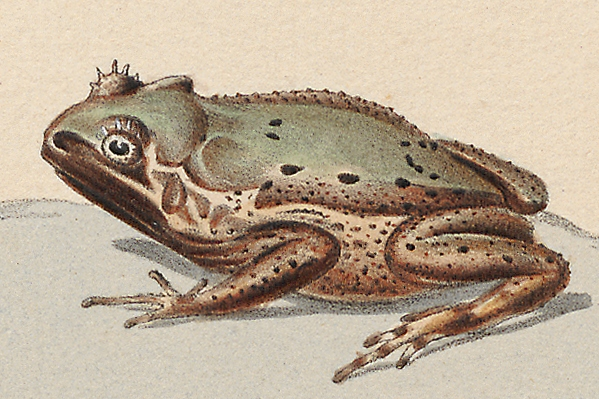

Conservation status
- Least Concern (IUCN 3.1)

Scientific classification
- Kingdom: Animalia
- Phylum: Chordata
- Class: Amphibia
- Order: Anura
- Family: Microhylidae
- Genus: Asterophrys
- Species: A. turpicola

Binomial name
- Asterophrys turpicola (Schlegel, 1837)

Synonyms
- Ceratophrys turpicola Schlegel, 1837; Ceratophrys turpicula — incorrect subsequent spelling Asterophrys leopoldi De Witte, 1930 "1929"; Asterophrys steini Ahl, 1932

= Asterophrys turpicola =

Species of frog

Asterophrys turpicola (common name: New Guinea bush frog) is a species of frog in the family Microhylidae. It is widespread in New Guinea and found in both West Papua (Indonesia) and Papua New Guinea, although it appears to be absent from the eastern half of Papua New Guinea. It also occurs on the island of Yapen, off the north-western coast of New Guinea. The species is known for its aggressive behaviour: it can attack and bite viciously.

== Description ==
Asterophrys turpicola grows to a maximum size of 65 mm (2.6 in) in snout–vent length. The head is very broad, as wide as the body. There is an elongated, spine-like tubercle on each eyelid, and two prominent tubercles on the lower jaw. The tongue is blue. The fingers and toes have expanded discs. The colouration is drab with shades of brown and black, but the hands and feet are pigmented. The limbs and sides of the body bears warts.

== Behaviour ==
Asterophrys turpicola shows unusual defensive behaviours: when threatened, the frog takes an aggressive posture, inflating its body and opening its mouth widely, thus exposing its blue tongue. It may also attack the enemy, leaping forward with its mouth open and biting the potential predator; it may hold its grip for several minutes. The related Asterophrys leucopus does not show these behaviours.

Males call from below the surface of the forest floor. The call is a short, ascending trill.

== Habitat and conservation ==
The species' natural habitats are lowland and foothill rainforests at elevations below 1,000 m (3,300 ft) above sea level. It also adapts to disturbed and degraded environments, including suburban gardens.

Asterophrys turpicola is patchily distributed but can be locally abundant. No significant threats to it have been identified. It probably occurs in several protected areas.
