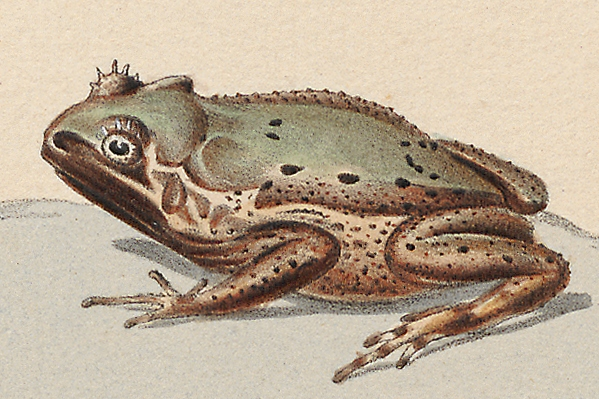
- Asterophrys turpicola

Scientific classification
- Kingdom: Animalia
- Phylum: Chordata
- Class: Amphibia
- Order: Anura
- Family: Microhylidae
- Subfamily: Asterophryinae
- Genus: Asterophrys; Tschudi, 1838

Type species
- Ceratophrys turpicola Schlegel, 1837

Diversity
- See text

Synonyms
- Metamagnusia Günther, 2009; Pseudocallulops Günther, 2009

= Asterophrys =

Genus of amphibians

Asterophrys is a genus of microhylid frogs found in New Guinea. Their common name is New Guinea bush frogs, although this name may also specifically refer to Asterophrys turpicola.

Asterophrys are moderate to large-sized microhylid frogs, with the larger Asterophrys turpicola measuring up to 65 mm (2.6 in) in snout–vent length. A distinctive feature of these frogs is their extremely broad head, almost half of snout–vent length. While both are New Guinean species, A. leucopus is more a mountain species than A. turpicola. The latter is known for its aggressiveness (it may even bite), whereas A. leucopus is more docile.

== Species ==
The following species are recognised in the genus Asterophrys:

Binomial Name and Author	Common Name
Asterophrys eurydactyla (Zweifel, 1972)	Danowaria Callulops frog
Asterophrys foja (Günther, Richards, and Tjaturadi, 2016)
Asterophrys leucopus Richards, Johnston & Burton, 1994
Asterophrys marani (Günther, 2009)
Asterophrys pullifer (Günther, 2006)
Asterophrys slateri Loveridge, 1955	Slater's Callulops frog
Asterophrys turpicola (Schlegel, 1837)	New Guinea bush frog

A third, undescribed species may exist in Papua, western New Guinea.
