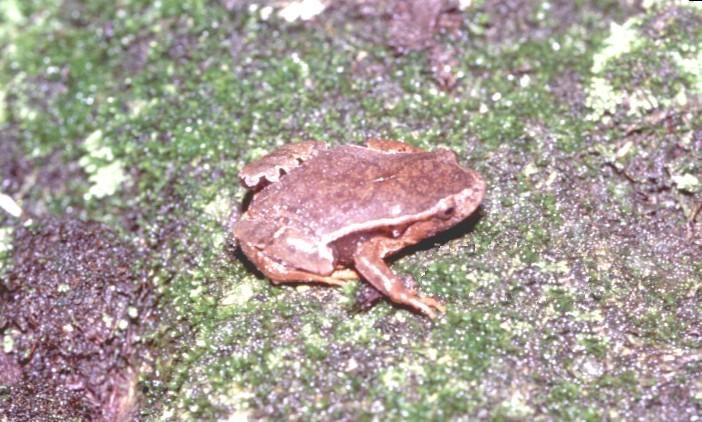
- Paratelmatobius poecilogaster

Scientific classification
- Domain: Eukaryota
- Kingdom: Animalia
- Phylum: Chordata
- Class: Amphibia
- Order: Anura
- Family: Leptodactylidae
- Subfamily: Paratelmatobiinae
- Genus: Paratelmatobius; Lutz and Carvalho, 1958

Type species
- Paratelmatobius lutzii Lutz and Carvalho, 1958

Diversity
- See text

= Paratelmatobius =

Genus of amphibians

Paratelmatobius is a genus of frogs in the family Leptodactylidae. They are endemic to southern Brazil.

== Species ==
The following species are recognised in the genus Paratelmatobius :

| Binomial Name and Author | Common Name |
|---|---|
| Paratelmatobius cardosoi (Pombal & Haddad, 1999) |
| Paratelmatobius gaigeae (Cochran, 1938) | Gaige's rapids frog |
| Paratelmatobius lutzii (Lutz & Carvalho, 1958) | Lutz's rapids frog |
| Paratelmatobius mantiqueira (Pombal & Haddad, 1999) |
| Paratelmatobius poecilogaster (Giaretta & Castanho, 1990) | San Andre rapids frog |
| Paratelmatobius segallai (Santos, Oliveira, Carvalho, Zaidan, Silva, Berneck, and Garcia, 2019) |
| Paratelmatobius yepiranga (Garcia, Berneck, and Costa, 2009) |

AmphibiaWeb also lists Paratelmatobius pictiventris, but Amphibian Species of the World considers it a synonym of Paratelmatobius gaigeae.
