= Paratelmatobius mantiqueira =

Conservation status
- Critically Endangered (IUCN 3.1)

Scientific classification
- Kingdom: Animalia
- Phylum: Chordata
- Class: Amphibia
- Order: Anura
- Family: Leptodactylidae
- Genus: Paratelmatobius
- Species: P. mantiqueira

Binomial name
- Paratelmatobius mantiqueira Pombal and Haddad, 1999

Species of frog

Paratelmatobius mantiqueira is a species of frog in the family Leptodactylidae. It is endemic to Brazil where it is known from the Mantiqueira Mountains in the states of São Paulo and Rio de Janeiro.

== Description ==
This is the smallest frog in Paratelmatobius. The adult male frog measures 14.4 to 16.7 mm in snout-vent length. There is no webbed skin on the front feet.

== Habitat ==
People found this frog on the leaf litter in closed-canopy primary and secondary rainforests. This frog has high habitat specificity, known only from high-altitude areas containing stream headwaters. Scientists have observed this frog between 1650 and 1700 meters above sea level.

Scientists saw this frog in a protected area, Área de Proteção Ambiental São Francisco Xavier. They think it may live in Reserva Particular do Patrimônio Natural Reserva dos Muriquis too.

== Reproduction ==
These frogs have young in pools of water in very small permanent and temporary streams. The free-living tadpoles swim in the water.

== Threats ==
The IUCN classifies this species as critically endangered. Its largest threat is habitat loss from forest conversion to agriculture and urbanizationa and abstraction of water for canals and other purposes.

Scientists detected the dangerous fungus Batrachochytrium dendrobatidis on other frogs in the frog's range, but they do not the extent to which chytridiomycosis threatens P. mantiqueria.

Climate change could also threaten this frog because it lives in forests high above sea level. Animals that live in such places tend to climb higher into cooler habitats when necessary, but this frog may find no suitable habitat at such elevations.
