= Rhinella iserni =

Conservation status
- Data Deficient (IUCN 3.1)

Scientific classification
- Kingdom: Animalia
- Phylum: Chordata
- Class: Amphibia
- Order: Anura
- Family: Bufonidae
- Genus: Rhinella
- Species: R. iserni

Binomial name
- Rhinella iserni (Jiménez de la Espada, 1875)

Synonyms
- Oxyrhynchus iserni Jiménez de la Espada, 1875; Bufo iserni (Jiménez de la Espada, 1875)

Species of amphibian

Rhinella iserni, also known as the Rio Perene toad, is a species of toad in the family Bufonidae. It is endemic to Peru and is known from the Andean valleys of Chanchamayo and Perené Rivers in the Junín Region. It inhabits montane tropical forest. However, precise habitat data, including altitude, are lacking. It could not be found in surveys conducted in 2014. Threats to this species are not known. It might be present in Pui Pui Protection Forest or San Matías–San Carlos Protection Forest.
