= Telmatobius dankoi =

Conservation status
- Critically Endangered (IUCN 3.1)

Scientific classification
- Kingdom: Animalia
- Phylum: Chordata
- Class: Amphibia
- Order: Anura
- Family: Telmatobiidae
- Genus: Telmatobius
- Species: T. dankoi

Binomial name
- Telmatobius dankoi Formas, Northland, Capetillo, Núñez, Cuevas, Brieva, 1999

Species of amphibian

Telmatobius dankoi, also known as the Loa water frog, is a species of critically endangered aquatic frog in the family Telmatobiidae. It is endemic to Chile and is only known from its type locality near Calama, in the El Loa province. Only 14 individuals are known from captivity following the destruction of its habitat prior to 2019, so it may already be extinct in the wild. However, it is doubtfully distinct from Telmatobius halli and thus may not be a distinct species.

Telmatobius dankoi is only known from its type locality near Calama, northern Chile

== Taxonomy ==
The specific name dankoi honors professor Danko Brncic, a Chilean geneticist. Prior to its description in 1999, it was confused with Telmatobius halli. However, multiple studies indicate little divergence between this species and Telmatobius vilamensis, and T. vilmanensis itself is doubtfully distinct from T. halli, and thus all three species may be conspecific with one another.

== Description ==
Adult males measure 49–55 mm (1.9–2.2 in) and females 46–52 mm (1.8–2.0 in) in snout–vent length. There are small thorns on the posterior third of the body, flanks, head, and extremities. Tympanum and tympanic ring are absent. The toes are webbed. Males have small nuptial spines.

The tadpoles are large: the longest measured tadpole was 85 mm (3.3 in). The body is ovoid and measures about 30 mm (1.2 in) among the largest tadpoles.

== Habitat and ecology ==
The species has been collected in small streams along the Loa River at about 2,260 m (7,410 ft) above sea level. The streams are bordered by Baccharis glutinosa and Tessaria absinthioides and are located in a high desert environment.

Stomach contents of two adult specimens revealed a diet consisting of odonate larvae, snails of genus Littoridina, and amphipods (Hyalella gracilicornis); the last were the dominant group. Beetles from families Dytiscidae and Elmidae were present in the habitat but not identified in the stomach contents.

Tapeworm Ophiotaenia calamensis was described as a new species based on specimens from the small intestine of this frog. Three tapeworms, measuring 45–70 mm (1.8–2.8 in) in total length, were found in the eight adult male frogs examined.

== Conservation ==
In 2015, the International Union for Conservation of Nature (IUCN) assessed Telmatobius dankoi as being critically endangered. Its range is very small, and the habitat is affected by water pollution from mining activities. Additional threats are abstraction of surface water for human consumption and agriculture, as well as recreational activities.

In 2019, a team of conservationists and indigenous leaders visited the type locality of the species and found that it had been devastated by water extraction by mining, agriculture, and real estate development, with the creeks completely dry and the vegetation parched. The lack of dead frogs indicated that the change had happened a long time prior to their arrival. Further surveys found a small, muddy pool of water nearby which contained 14 highly malnourished individuals, possibly the last surviving members of the species. The frogs were captured and transported to the Chilean National Zoo for the purpose of captive breeding. Conservationists have petitioned the Chilean government to protect and restore the habitat of T. dankoi for reintroduction. In October 2020, the National Zoo announced the birth of about 200 tadpoles, offspring of the specimens rescued in 2019.
