= Raorchestes vellikkannan =

Conservation status
- Data Deficient (IUCN 3.1)

Scientific classification
- Kingdom: Animalia
- Phylum: Chordata
- Class: Amphibia
- Order: Anura
- Family: Rhacophoridae
- Genus: Raorchestes
- Species: R. vellikkannan

Binomial name
- Raorchestes vellikkannan Garg, Suyesh, Das, Bee, and Biju, 2021

Species of frog

Raorchestes vellikkannan, the silver-eyed shrub frog, is a species of frog in the family Rhacophoridae. It is endemic to India. Scientists know it from the Western Ghat mountains in Kerala. This frog has been observed 856 meters above sea level, north of the Palghat Gap. Scientists believe this frog breeds through direct development and never swims as a tadpole, like its congeners.

== Taxonomy ==
Raorchestes vellikkannan was described in 2021 by the herpetologist Sonali Garg and her colleagues based on an adult male specimen collected in Singappara, Palakkad district in the Indian state of Kerala. The specific epithet is derived from the Malayalam velli (meaning silver) and kannu (meaning eye), referring to the silver irises of this species.

Raorchestes vellikkannan is a member of the Raorchestes chromasynchysi group within its genus and is most closely related to R. sanjappai.

== Description ==
Raorchestes vellikkannan is a small species, with a male snout–vent length of 22.2–22.9 mm. The dorsum is light brown with a yellowish tinge, with a dark brown X-shaped marking and scattered brown spots. The loreal and tympanic regions are darker than the dorsum, with more brownish spots. The sides of the body are light yellowish-brown and the groin is yellowish-brown with a few irregular dark spots. The posterior part of the thighs is light to dark chocolate-brown. The limbs are light yellowish-brown, slightly lighter than the dorsum, and have dark brown cross-bands. The throat is greyish-white with minute brown spots and the chest and belly are off-white. The underside of the limbs is light greyish-brown and the hands and feet are dark grey. The iris is silver grey with minute brown speckling.

== Distribution and habitat ==
Raorchestes vellikkannan is endemic to the Western Ghats and currently known only from its type locality of Singappara and surrounding regions of the Silent Valley National Park in Palakkad district of Kerala, north of the Palghat gap. This species was observed inside primary forests and individuals were found on vegetation up to 4 m high during the breeding season.
