= Lynchius simmonsi =

Conservation status
- Vulnerable (IUCN 3.1)

Scientific classification
- Kingdom: Animalia
- Phylum: Chordata
- Class: Amphibia
- Order: Anura
- Family: Strabomantidae
- Genus: Lynchius
- Species: L. simmonsi

Binomial name
- Lynchius simmonsi (Lynch, 1974)

Synonyms
- Ischnocnema simmonsi Lynch, 1974; Oreobates simmonsi (Lynch, 1974)

Species of amphibian

Lynchius simmonsi, also known as Simmons' big-headed frog, is a frog species in the family Strabomantidae. It is endemic to southern Ecuador where it is known from the type locality in the Cordillera del Cóndor, Morona-Santiago Province as well as from the adjacent Zamora-Chinchipe Province. Its natural habitat is subtropical old-growth forest. The type series was collected by day on the forest floor. The area was mined during the Cenepa War in 1995, and has consequently seen little human activity, although this may change through a proposed road.

== Description ==
Lynchius simmonsi is a small frog; a subadult female measured 26 mm (1.0 in) in snout–vent length. The head is longer than wide; the snout is short. The dorsum is reddish brown with dark brown marks; the skin is uniformly granular, with small, round, elevated, keratinized granules.
