= Pristimantis ixalus =

Conservation status
- Data Deficient (IUCN 3.1)

Scientific classification
- Kingdom: Animalia
- Phylum: Chordata
- Class: Amphibia
- Order: Anura
- Clade: Brachycephaloidea
- Family: Craugastoridae
- Genus: Pristimantis
- Species: P. ixalus

Binomial name
- Pristimantis ixalus (Lynch, 2003)

Synonyms
- Eleutherodactylus ixalus Lynch, 2003

Species of amphibian

Pristimantis ixalus is a species of frog in the family Strabomantidae. It is endemic to Colombia where it is known from its type locality in the northern Cordillera Oriental (Betulia in the Santander Department). Its natural habitat are streams in very humid forest. It is potentially threatened by habitat loss.
