= Paratelmatobius gaigeae =

Conservation status
- Endangered (IUCN 3.1)

Scientific classification
- Kingdom: Animalia
- Phylum: Chordata
- Class: Amphibia
- Order: Anura
- Family: Leptodactylidae
- Genus: Paratelmatobius
- Species: P. gaigeae

Binomial name
- Paratelmatobius gaigeae (Cochran, 1938)

Synonyms
- Leptodactylus gaigeae Cochran, 1938; Paratelmatobius pictiventris A. Lutz in B. Lutz and Carvalho, 1958

Species of frog

Paratelmatobius gaigeae (common name: Gaige's rapids frog) is a species of frog in the family Leptodactylidae. This species was first described by Doris Cochran in 1938 and originally named Leptodactylus gaigeae. It is endemic to Serra da Bocaina, a part of Serra do Mar, southeastern Brazil. Paratelmatobius gaigeae is named after Helen Beulah Thompson Gaige, an American herpetologist.

== Description ==
The skin of the dorsum of the body and limbs is brown in color. There is a black stripe on the shank. There is a white line on the back. There is a white line from each eyelid to the groin. There is a dark brown stripe from each eye down the flank. The throat is red and dark gray with white dots. The bottoms of the legs, belly and feet are red or red with white marks.

== Habitat ==
Scientists consider this frog an obligate dweller of primary rainforest, but a few people have reported it deep in secondary forests in the first stages of recovery, usually when there was some primary forest nearby. Scientists saw the frog between 1160 and 1570 meters above sea level.

Scientists observed the frog in two protected parks: Estação Ecológica de Bananal and Caburé Natural Heritage Nature Reserve. They think it could live in nearby Parque Nacional da Serra da Bocaina as well.

== Reproduction ==
The male frog sits on the leaf litter and calls to the female frogs at night. The female frog deposits eggs in temporary ponds and streams. The tadpoles swim in the bottom of the water and feed on dead leaves.

== Threats ==
The IUCN classifies this frog is endangered. Human beings engage in clear-cutting for purposes of logging and charcoal production and to make room for agriculture, silviculture, and livestock grazing. Climate change could also threaten this frog.
