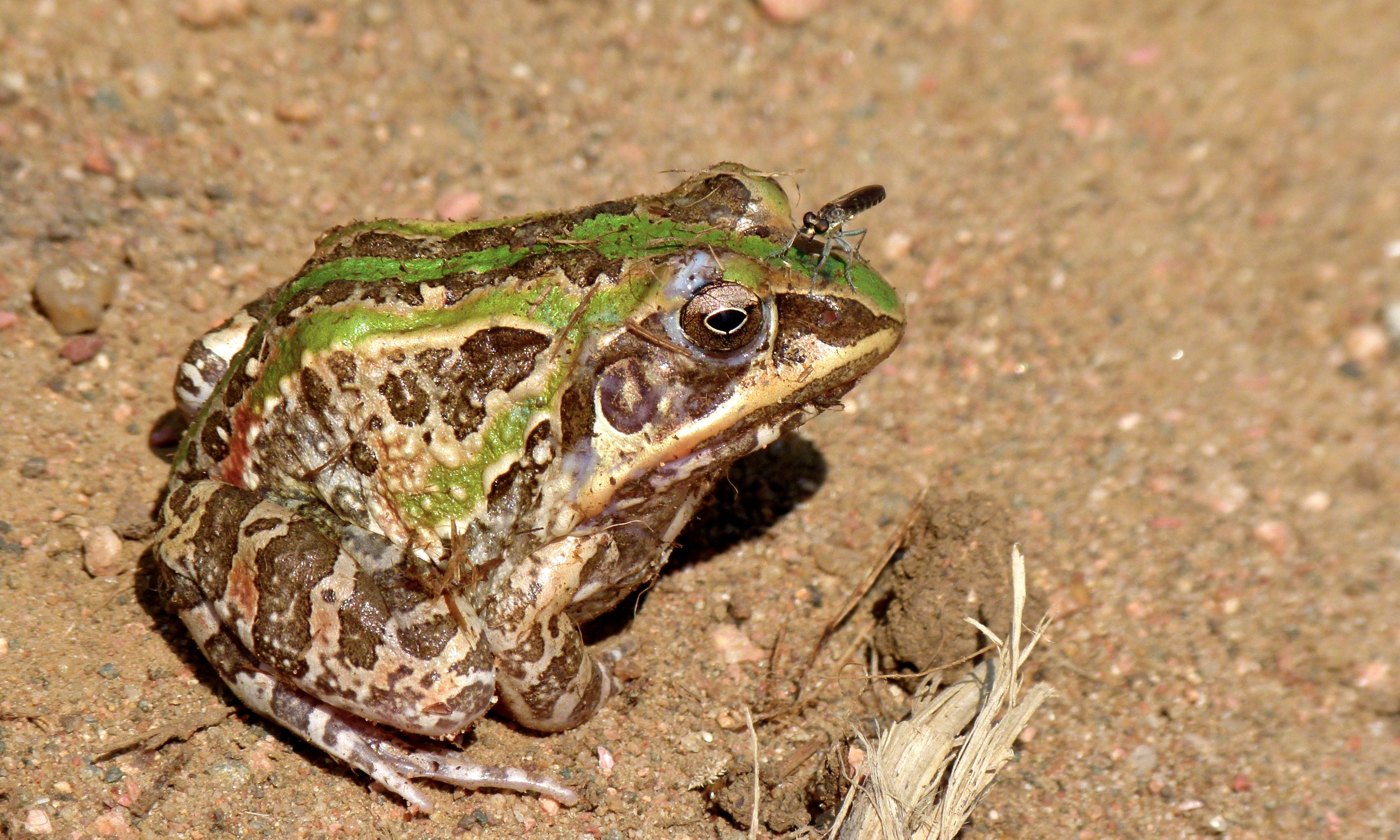
- Hildebrandtia ornata

Scientific classification
- Domain: Eukaryota
- Kingdom: Animalia
- Phylum: Chordata
- Class: Amphibia
- Order: Anura
- Family: Ptychadenidae
- Genus: Hildebrandtia; Nieden, 1907

Type species
- Pyxicephalus ornatus Peters, 1878

= Hildebrandtia (frog) =

Genus of amphibians

Hildebrandtia is a genus of frogs in the family Ptychadenidae. They are distributed in tropical and subtropical Sub-Saharan Africa. The common name of this genus is Hildebrandt's burrowing frogs or ornate frogs. The genus name honours Johann Maria Hildebrandt, a German botanist and explorer.

== Description and ecology ==
Hildebrandtia are medium-sized to large frogs with stocky bodies. They use their large inner metatarsal tubercles for digging. They live in dry to very dry savanna habitats and stay hidden in their burrows most of the year. Reproduction takes place in temporary ponds and puddles at the beginning of the rainy season. The tadpoles are robust-bodied with a muscular tail and low tail fin. They have strong jaws and are carnivorous.

== Species ==
There are three species in this genus:

- Hildebrandtia macrotympanum (Boulenger, 1912)
- Hildebrandtia ornata (Peters, 1878)
- Hildebrandtia ornatissima (Bocage, 1879)
