= Lynchius parkeri =

Conservation status
- Endangered (IUCN 3.1)

Scientific classification
- Kingdom: Animalia
- Phylum: Chordata
- Class: Amphibia
- Order: Anura
- Family: Strabomantidae
- Genus: Lynchius
- Species: L. parkeri

Binomial name
- Lynchius parkeri (Lynch, 1975)

Synonyms
- Phrynopus parkeri Lynch, 1975

Species of frog

Lynchius parkeri, also known as Parker's Andes frog, is a species of frog in the family Strabomantidae. It is found in northern Peru (Cordillera de Huancabamba, Department of Piura) and southern Ecuador (Yacurí National Park, Loja Province). The specific name parkeri honors Hampton Wildman Parker, English zoologist and herpetologist.

== Description ==
Adult males measure 21–28 mm (0.8–1.1 in) and adult females 25–35 mm (1.0–1.4 in) in snout–vent length. The head is as long as it is wide or slightly longer; the snout is rounded. The tympanum is indistinct. The fingers and toes have narrowly rounded tips; no webbing is present. The dorsum is gray, reddish, or grayish brown, or dark brown. The flanks are dark brown with metallic green mottling. The venter is dark gray to black with large yellow blotches on the belly in males, but yellow with brown reticulations on the belly in females.

== Habitat and conservation ==
Lynchius parkeri occurs in humid montane forests and páramo at elevations of 2,700–3,397 m (8,858–11,145 ft) above sea level. Individuals have been found hiding under rocks and in bunchgrass or low vegetation. Development is direct (i.e., there is no free-living larval stage).

Lynchius parkeri is an uncommon species. It is threatened by habitat loss caused by expanding agricultural activities. The Ecuadorian record is from a protected area (Yacurí National Park).
