= Asterophrys slateri =

Conservation status
- Least Concern (IUCN 3.1)

Scientific classification
- Kingdom: Animalia
- Phylum: Chordata
- Class: Amphibia
- Order: Anura
- Family: Microhylidae
- Genus: Asterophrys
- Species: A. slateri

Binomial name
- Asterophrys slateri Loveridge, 1955

Synonyms
- Metamagnusia slateri (Loveridge, 1955); Phrynomantis slateri — Zweifel, 1972; Callulops slateri — Dubois, 1988

Species of frog

Asterophrys slateri is a species of frog in the family Microhylidae. It is found in New Guinea. Its natural habitats are subtropical or tropical moist lowland forests, subtropical or tropical moist montane forests, and heavily degraded former forest. It is threatened by habitat loss.
