= Leptodactylus pascoensis =

Conservation status
- Data Deficient (IUCN 3.1)

Scientific classification
- Kingdom: Animalia
- Phylum: Chordata
- Class: Amphibia
- Order: Anura
- Family: Leptodactylidae
- Genus: Leptodactylus
- Species: L. pascoensis

Binomial name
- Leptodactylus pascoensis Heyer, 1994

Species of frog

Leptodactylus pascoensis is a species of frog in the family Leptodactylidae. It is endemic to Peru where it is only known from two localities (Chontilla, Pasco, and Serrania de Sira, Huánuco). It is an inhabitant of forest floor of the Amazonian flanks of the Andes. Reproduction takes place in foam nests in temporary ponds.

This terrestrial frog lives in forests on the east side of the Andes mountains. Scientists have seen the frog between 780 and 2500 meters above sea level.

Scientists have seen the frog in at least one part of the Oxapampa-Asháninka-Yánesha Biosphere Reserve: Yanesha Communal Reserve. They think it might also live in El Sira Communal Reserve, Parque Nacional Yanachaga Chemillén, and Bosque de Protección San Matias San Carlos.

Leptodactylus pascoensis is not an uncommon species but its range is small and it suffers from habitat loss caused by increased agricultural activity.

Male Leptodactylus pascoensis grow to a snout–vent length of 60–61 mm (2.4–2.4 in) and females to 52–67 mm (2.0–2.6 in).
