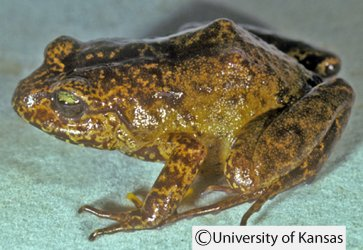
- Lynchius flavomaculatus

Scientific classification
- Kingdom: Animalia
- Phylum: Chordata
- Class: Amphibia
- Order: Anura
- Clade: Brachycephaloidea
- Family: Craugastoridae
- Subfamily: Pristimantinae
- Genus: Lynchius; Hedges, Duellman, and Heinicke, 2008

Type species
- Phrynopus parkeri Lynch, 1975

Diversity
- 8 species (see text)

= Lynchius =

Genus of amphibians

Lynchius is a genus of frogs in the family Craugastoridae. The name honours herpetologist John D. Lynch. The distribution of Lynchius is restricted to the Cordillera Oriental in southern Ecuador and Cordillera de Huancabamba in northern Peru.

== Taxonomy ==
The genus is relatively new; it was split off from Phrynopus in 2008 in order to resolve the paraphyly of that genus. The sister taxon of Lynchius is Oreobates.

== Description ==
Lynchius are relatively small frogs (snout–vent length up to 43 mm (1.7 in) in Lynchius flavomaculatus) with a narrow head, not as wide as body. Skin is smooth.

== Species ==
The following species are recognised in the genus Lynchius:

- Lynchius flavomaculatus (Parker, 1938)
- Lynchius megacephalus Sánchez-Nivicela, Urgilés, Navarrete, Yánez-Muñoz, and Ron, 2019
- Lynchius nebulanastes (Cannatella, 1984)
- Lynchius oblitus Motta, Chaparro, Pombal, Guayasamin, De la Riva, and Padial, 2016
- Lynchius parkeri (Lynch, 1975)
- Lynchius simmonsi (Lynch, 1974)
- Lynchius tabaconas Motta, Chaparro, Pombal, Guayasamin, De la Riva, and Padial, 2016
- Lynchius waynehollomonae Venegas, García Ayachi, Ormeño, Bullard, Catenazzi, and Motta, 2021
