= Paratelmatobius lutzii =

Conservation status
- Critically endangered, possibly extinct (IUCN 3.1)

Scientific classification
- Kingdom: Animalia
- Phylum: Chordata
- Class: Amphibia
- Order: Anura
- Family: Leptodactylidae
- Genus: Paratelmatobius
- Species: P. lutzii

Binomial name
- Paratelmatobius lutzii B. Lutz & A. Carvalho, 1958

Species of amphibian

Paratelmatobius lutzii is a species of frog in the family Leptodactylidae. The species is endemic to Brazil, where it is known from the Mantiqueira Mountains in the state of Minas Gerais.

== Habitat ==
Its natural habitats are montane forests, and it breeds in stream headwaters at altitudes of 2,000–2,200 m (6,600–7,200 ft). It is only known from its type locality where it was once abundant, but it has not been recorded since 1979. It is known in one protected park, Parque Nacional do Itatiaia.

== Description ==
The adult frog measures 19.2-23.3 mm in snout-vent length. The dorsal skin is dark brown in color. Some frogs have light green color on their snouts. The undersides of the hind legs are gray with white places. The bottoms of the front legs are red. The belly is black with some white color. There is webbed skin on the feet.

== Etymology ==
The specific name, lutzii, is in honor of Brazilian physician and herpetologist Adolfo Lutz, who was the father of Bertha Lutz.

== Threats ==
Scientists are not certain of the cause of the decline in this population. They consider fires a possible cause. The dangerous fungus Batrachochytrium dendrobatidis has been detected on other animals in the frog's range, so the disease chytridiomycosis might have killed many of these frogs, as it has so many other high-altitude, stream-breeding South American frogs.
