= Asterophrys leucopus =

Conservation status
- Least Concern (IUCN 3.1)

Scientific classification
- Kingdom: Animalia
- Phylum: Chordata
- Class: Amphibia
- Order: Anura
- Family: Microhylidae
- Genus: Asterophrys
- Species: A. leucopus

Binomial name
- Asterophrys leucopus Richards, Johnston, and Burton, 1994

Species of frog

Asterophrys leucopus is a species of frog in the family Microhylidae. It is endemic to northwestern Papua New Guinea where it is known from three locations: Stolle Mountain in the Sandaun Province—its type locality, and Hunstein Mountains in the East Sepik Province and the Bewani Mountains in the West Sepik Province.

== Description ==
Asterophrys leucopus are moderately large microhylids. The three males in the type series measure 43–47 mm (1.7–1.9 in) in snout–vent length. A distinctive feature of these frogs, shared with the congeneric Asterophrys turpicola, is their extremely broad head, almost half of snout–vent length. The body is robust with short limbs. The colour pattern is mottled light and dark pinkish brown, with irregular black patches on dorsal and lateral surfaces; this gives these frogs a good camouflage against wet moss of their habitat. Males call from exposed positions; the call consists of a series of rapidly repeated introductory notes followed by slower terminal notes.

== Habitat and conservation ==
Asterophrys leucopus inhabit mossy rainforests at elevations of 950–1,600 m (3,120–5,250 ft) above sea level. No threats to this species have been identified.
