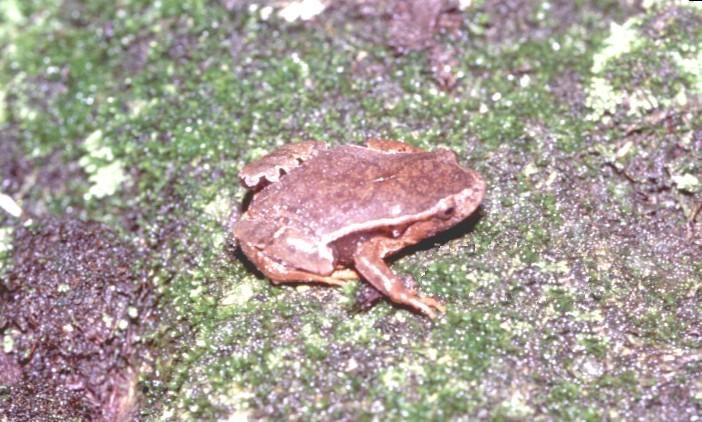

Conservation status
- Least Concern (IUCN 3.1)

Scientific classification
- Kingdom: Animalia
- Phylum: Chordata
- Class: Amphibia
- Order: Anura
- Family: Leptodactylidae
- Genus: Paratelmatobius
- Species: P. poecilogaster

Binomial name
- Paratelmatobius poecilogaster Giaretta and Castanho, 1990

= Paratelmatobius poecilogaster =

Species of frog

Paratelmatobius poecilogaster is a species of frog in the family Leptodactylidae. It is endemic to the Serra do Mar range, Brazil.

== Description ==
This is the largest frog in Paratelmatobius. The adult male measures 20 to 26 mm (0.79 to 1.02 in) in snout-vent length and the adult female 25.2 to 30.1 mm (0.99 to 1.19 in). The skin of the back and legs is brown and green with green spots. In some individuals, these spots form a line on the backbone. There are brown bars on the hind legs. There is a pink line from each eye to the groin. There is a gray stripe from each eye down the flank. There is a dark stripe from the eye to the mouth. The throat is black in the middle and orange on the sides. The belly is orange and red with black and white marks. The undersides of the forelegs are red.

== Habitat ==
People have observed this frog on the leaf litter in primary and secondary rainforest. Scientists have seen this frog between 500 and 800 metres (1,640 and 2,620 ft) above sea level.

Scientists found this frog in one protected park, Parque Estadual da Serra do Mar.

== Reproduction ==
The male frogs go to temporary pools of water and call to the female frogs. The female frogs deposit eggs, 5-13 per clutch on rocks above the pools. The tadpoles hatch and go into the water. The tadpoles can be 25.8 mm (1.02 in) long, including the tail.

== Threats ==
About 40-60% of this population lives in areas with extensive suitable habitat. The IUCN classifies this frog as least concern of extinction. The frogs that live outside the park may be in some danger as people cut down forests for urbanization, agriculture, silviculture, and cattle grazing. Long ago, there was significant habitat loss through logging, but only small-scale wood collection takes place now.
