= Paratelmatobius cardosoi =

Conservation status
- Least Concern (IUCN 3.1)

Scientific classification
- Kingdom: Animalia
- Phylum: Chordata
- Class: Amphibia
- Order: Anura
- Family: Leptodactylidae
- Genus: Paratelmatobius
- Species: P. cardosoi

Binomial name
- Paratelmatobius cardosoi Pombal and Haddad, 1999

Species of frog

Paratelmatobius cardosoi is a species of frog in the family Leptodactylidae. It is endemic to Brazil where it is known in the Serra do Mar range, São Paulo state, southeastern Brazil.

== Body ==
The adult male frog measures 17–17.9 mm in snout-vent length. The head is wider than it is long. The snout appears round. The skin of the dorsum is light gray with black marks and a yellow medial line. There is one orange spot on each side of the face. The belly and throat are gray with yellow and orange spots. There is one orange spot on each front leg.

== Etymology ==
The specific name cardosoi honors Adão José Cardoso, a Brazilian herpetologist.

== Habitat ==
Its natural habitats are primary and secondary forest, forest clearings and forest edges. Most of the frog's range is contained within Parque Estadual da Serra do Mar.

== Reproduction ==
Scientists believe this frog may be an explosive breeder. The female frog deposits eggs in muddy temporary ponds. The tadpoles develop in these ponds.

== Threats ==
The IUCN classifies this species as least concern of extinction. Most of these frogs live in the protected Parque Estadual da Serra do Mar. The frogs that live outside the park may be in some danger. People convert forests to towns, farms, tree farms, and cattle grazing areas. In the past, logging posed some threat, but wood extraction occurs at a much smaller scale now.
