= Pristimantis infraguttatus =

Conservation status
- Data Deficient (IUCN 3.1)

Scientific classification
- Kingdom: Animalia
- Phylum: Chordata
- Class: Amphibia
- Order: Anura
- Clade: Brachycephaloidea
- Family: Craugastoridae
- Genus: Pristimantis
- Species: P. infraguttatus

Binomial name
- Pristimantis infraguttatus (Duellman & Pramuk, 1999)

Synonyms
- Eleutherodactylus infraguttatus Duellman & Pramuk, 1999

Species of frog

Pristimantis infraguttatus is a species of frog in the family Strabomantidae. Endemic to Peru, it has been discovered in only two localities in the Rioja Province of San Martín Region; it occurs in the Alto Mayo Protection Forest. All known individuals were found on leaves on low vegetation less than a meter above the ground in humid forest at night. Reproduction is by direct development. It is threatened by habitat loss.
