= Lynchius megacephalus =

Scientific classification
- Kingdom: Animalia
- Phylum: Chordata
- Class: Amphibia
- Order: Anura
- Clade: Brachycephaloidea
- Family: Craugastoridae
- Genus: Lynchius
- Species: L. megacephalus

Binomial name
- Lynchius megacephalus Sánchez-Nivicela, Urgilés, Navarrete, Yánez-Muñoz, and Ron, 2019
- Lynchius megacephalus is only known from the Ecological Conservation Area Tinajillas-Río Gualaceño in the Morona-Santiago Province

Species of frog

Lynchius megacephalus, also known as the big-headed Andes frog, is a species of frog in the family Strabomantidae. It is endemic to Ecuador and only known from its type locality, Ecological Conservation Area Tinajillas-Río Gualaceño in the Morona-Santiago Province. The specific name megacephalus refers to the relatively large head of this frog.

== Description ==
Lynchius megacephalus is only known from its holotype, an adult female measuring 42 mm (1.7 in) in snout–vent length. The robust head is wider than it is long and wider than the body. The snout is rounded. The tympanum is distinct. The fingers and toes are long with narrow tips and no webbing. Skin is dorsally shagreened with many tubercles and ventrally smooth. The upper parts of the body and the head are brown with irregular dark brown spots. The belly is grayish-brown with irregular brown spots. The throat is dark brown. The iris is golden with reticulated black lines and a median horizontal black streak. A light-blue sclera is present at the upper edge of the eye.

== Habitat and conservation ==
The holotype was collected at night from the floor of montane forest at 2,770 m (9,090 ft) above sea level. The forest is characterized by small streams and thick (>10 cm) layer of leaf litter. The ecology of this species is otherwise unknown.

The type locality is a well-researched area, suggesting that this species is either rare or has habitat preferences that make it difficult to find. Sánchez-Nivicela and colleagues suggest that this species is best described as "data deficient" following the IUCN Red List criteria, and is classified as such in the Lista Roja Anfibios del Ecuador.
