= "Bufo" scorteccii =

Conservation status
- Data Deficient (IUCN 3.1)

Scientific classification
- Kingdom: Animalia
- Phylum: Chordata
- Class: Amphibia
- Order: Anura
- Family: Bufonidae
- Genus: "Bufo"
- Species: "B." scorteccii

Binomial name
- "Bufo" scorteccii Balletto & Cherchi, 1970

Synonyms
- Duttaphrynus scorteccii

Species of amphibian

"Bufo" scorteccii (Scortecci's toad) is a species of toad in the family Bufonidae. It is endemic to Yemen, with its range restricted to a plateau near the western region of Mafhaq. Its natural habitats are shrubland as well as wetland areas.

It was originally described in the genus Bufo in 1970. In 2006, it was removed from that genus but not assigned to another genus until 2009 when it was assigned to Duttaphrynus. This was reversed in 2015 due to physical characteristics that are similar to both Duttaphrynus and Sclerophrys.
