= Niceforonia aderca =

Conservation status
- Data Deficient (IUCN 3.1)

Scientific classification
- Kingdom: Animalia
- Phylum: Chordata
- Class: Amphibia
- Order: Anura
- Family: Strabomantidae
- Genus: Niceforonia
- Species: N. aderca

Binomial name
- Niceforonia aderca (Lynch, 2003)

Synonyms
- Eleutherodactylus adercus Lynch, 2003; Hypodactylus adercus (Lynch, 2003)

Species of frog

Niceforonia aderca is a species of frog in the family Strabomantidae. It is endemic to Colombia and only known from its type locality, Betulia, Santander, on the western flank of the Cordillera Oriental. It is only known from the holotype collected in 2001.

== Description ==
The holotype is an adult male measuring 19 mm (0.75 in) in snout–vent length. The head is broader than body. The snout is subacuminate dorsally and sloping in lateral view. The supratympanic fold obvious and obscuring upper edge of the tympanum that is otherwise round. Skin is smooth apart from the flanks that are granular. Fingers have no lateral fringes nor discs, whereas the toes bear prominent discs. The dorsum is dark brown, and there is a pale brown line running along the canthus rostralis to the tip of the snout. The throat and abdomen are dark gray. The feet are dirty yellow under. The iris is dark and has some metallic golden flecks.

== Habitat and conservation ==
The holotype was found in leaf litter in mature cloud forest at 2,280 m (7,480 ft) above sea level. Specific threats to this species are unknown, but it is presumably impacted by habitat loss caused by smallholder farming and subsistence wood extraction.
