= Asterophrys pullifer =

Conservation status
- Data Deficient (IUCN 3.1)

Scientific classification
- Kingdom: Animalia
- Phylum: Chordata
- Class: Amphibia
- Order: Anura
- Family: Microhylidae
- Genus: Asterophrys
- Species: A. pullifer

Binomial name
- Asterophrys pullifer (Günther, 2006)

Synonyms
- Callulops pullifer Günther, 2006; Pseudocallulops pullifer (Günther, 2006)

Species of frog

Asterophrys pullifer is a species of frog in the family Microhylidae. It is endemic to New Guinea and known from the Wondiwoi Mountains at the base of the Wandammen Peninsula in Western New Guinea (Indonesia), and from the Mount Shungol and Bowutu Mountains in Papua New Guinea.
