= Paratelmatobius yepiranga =

Conservation status
- Data Deficient (IUCN 3.1)

Scientific classification
- Kingdom: Animalia
- Phylum: Chordata
- Class: Amphibia
- Order: Anura
- Family: Leptodactylidae
- Genus: Paratelmatobius
- Species: P. yepiranga

Binomial name
- Paratelmatobius yepiranga Garcia, Berneck, and Costa, 2009

Species of frog

Paratelmatobius yepiranga is a frog in the family Leptodactylidae. Scientists know it exclusively from its type locality in Parque das Neblinas in São Paulo, Brazil.

Scientists heard the male frogs calling at night during the rainy season. The frogs were found in small, muddy ponds in forests. Scientists believe this frog only lives in closed-canopy rainforest and believe that it reproduces in small streams and pools and that the free-swimming tadpoles develop in the water.

Scientists observed the frog 767 meters above sea level in Parque das Neblinas, which overlaps with Parque Estadual da Serra do Mar, so scientists infer it could live in Parque Estadual da Serra do Mar also.

== Original publication ==
- Garcia PCdA; Berneck BVM; Costa COR (2009). "A new species of Paratelmatobius (Amphibia, Anura, Leptodactylidae) from Atlantic rain forest of southeastern Brazil". SA J Herpt. 4: 217–224.
