= Pristimantis floridus =

Conservation status
- Data Deficient (IUCN 3.1)

Scientific classification
- Kingdom: Animalia
- Phylum: Chordata
- Class: Amphibia
- Order: Anura
- Clade: Brachycephaloidea
- Family: Craugastoridae
- Genus: Pristimantis
- Species: P. floridus

Binomial name
- Pristimantis floridus (Lynch & Duellman, 1997)

Synonyms
- Eleutherodactylus floridus Lynch & Duellman, 1997

Species of amphibian

Pristimantis floridus is a species of frog in the family Strabomantidae.

It is endemic to Ecuador. Its natural habitats are tropical moist lowland forests and moist montane forests. It is threatened by habitat loss.
