= Betulia, Santander =

Betulia
- Municipality
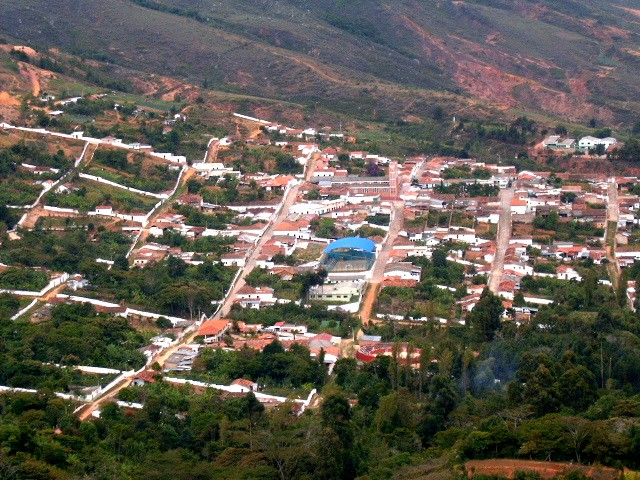
- Skyline of Betulia

- Flag Coat of arms

- Location of the municipality and town of Betulia, Santander in the Santander Department of Colombia.
- Coordinates: 6°54′00″N 73°17′01″W
- Country: Colombia
- Department: Santander
- Province: Yariguies
- Founded (town): February 13, 1844
- Incorporated (parish): June 6, 1845
- Founder: Pedro Guarín; José María Prada; Julián García; Pedro Gómez

Government
  - Mayor: Lina Maria Alfonso Rojas

Area
  - Municipality: 413.3 km^{2} (159.6 sq mi)
- Elevation: 1,840 m (6,040 ft)

Population (2005)
  - Municipality: 5,350
  - Density: 12.9/km^{2} (33/sq mi)
  - Urban: 1,183
- DANE
- Time zone: UTC-5 (Colombia Standard Time)
- Climate: Cfb
- Website: http://www.betulia-santander.gov.co/

Betulia is a town and municipality in the Santander Department in northeastern Colombia.

== Biodiversity ==
Frog Hypodactylus adercus is only known from Betulia, its type locality.
