= "Colostethus" poecilonotus =

Conservation status
- Data Deficient (IUCN 3.1)

Scientific classification
- Kingdom: Animalia
- Phylum: Chordata
- Class: Amphibia
- Order: Anura
- Superfamily: Dendrobatoidea
- Family: Dendrobatidae
- Genus: "Colostethus"
- Species: "C." poecilonotus

Binomial name
- "Colostethus" poecilonotus Rivero, 1991

Species of amphibian

"Colostethus" poecilonotus is a species of frog that is endemic to Peru. It is only known from the holotype collected in the Amazonas Region. Its generic placement is uncertain, with the temporary genus designation as "Colostethus" within the family Dendrobatidae.

Its natural habitat is moist lowland tropical forest. It is threatened by habitat loss as the type locality is already altered by agricultural activities (e.g., coffee plantations) and urbanization.
