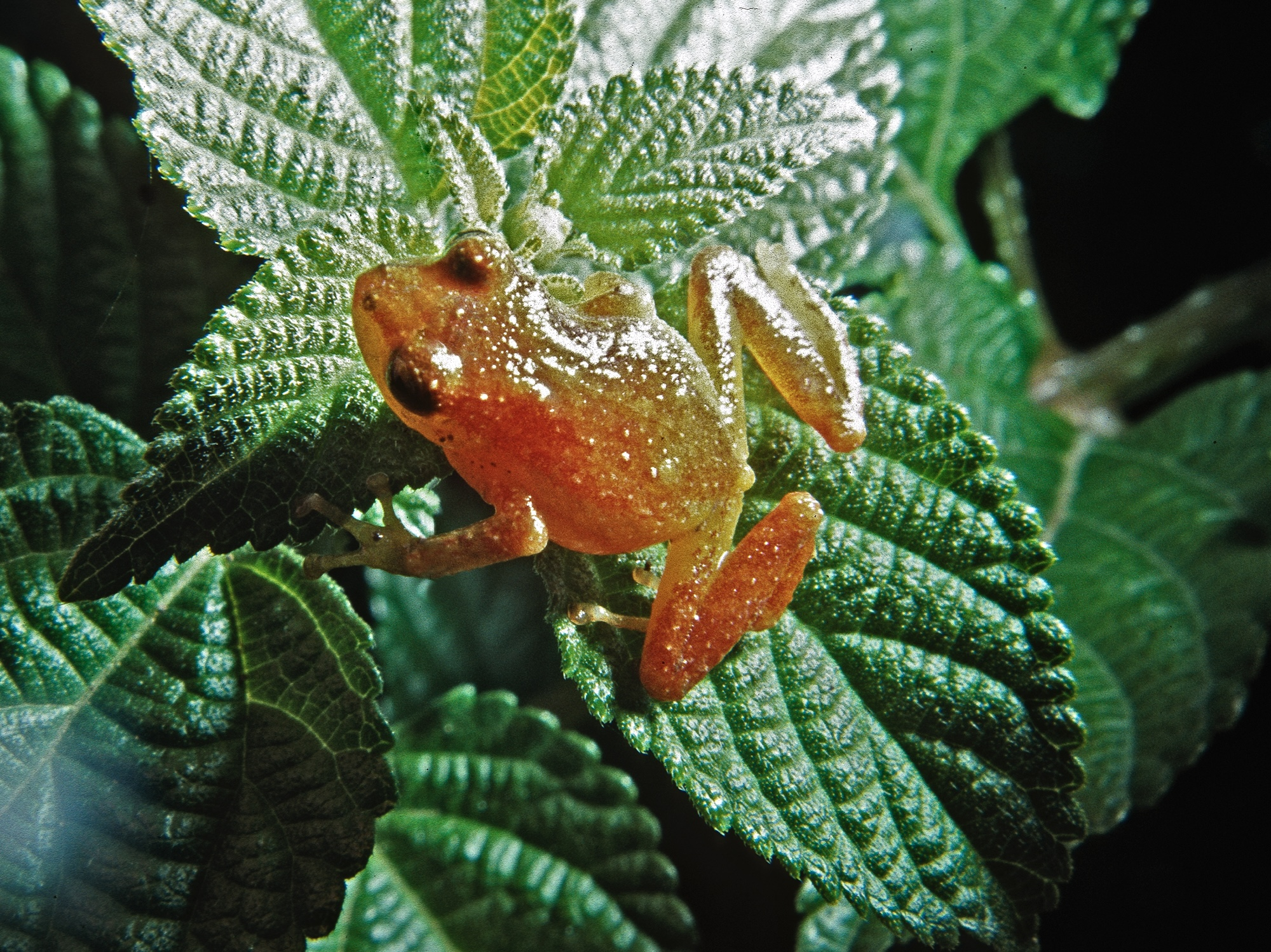

Conservation status
- Data Deficient (IUCN 3.1)

Scientific classification
- Kingdom: Animalia
- Phylum: Chordata
- Class: Amphibia
- Order: Anura
- Clade: Brachycephaloidea
- Family: Craugastoridae
- Genus: Pristimantis
- Species: P. anemerus

Binomial name
- Pristimantis anemerus (Duellman & Pramuk, 1999)

Synonyms
- Eleutherodactylus atrabracus Duellman & Pramuk, 1999

= Pristimantis anemerus =

Species of amphibian

Pristimantis anemerus is a species of frog in the family Strabomantidae. It is endemic to Peru where it is only known from the region of its type locality near Canchaque, Huancabamba Province, in the Piura Region of north-western Peru. Its natural habitat is humid montane forest.
