= Pristimantis atrabracus =

Conservation status
- Data Deficient (IUCN 3.1)

Scientific classification
- Kingdom: Animalia
- Phylum: Chordata
- Class: Amphibia
- Order: Anura
- Clade: Brachycephaloidea
- Family: Craugastoridae
- Genus: Pristimantis
- Species: P. atrabracus

Binomial name
- Pristimantis atrabracus (Duellman & Pramuk, 1999)

Synonyms
- Eleutherodactylus atrabracus Duellman & Pramuk, 1999

Species of amphibian

Pristimantis atrabracus is a species of frog in the family Strabomantidae. It is endemic to Peru where it is only known from the region of its type locality near La Peca, Bagua Province, in the Amazonas Region of northern Peru.

== Description ==
The holotype (an adult female) measured 22.7 mm (0.89 in) in snout–vent length. The specific name atrabracus means "black trousers", in reference to the black ventral surfaces of the hind limbs in this species, having a resemblance of trousers.

== Habitat and conservation ==
Its natural habitats are evergreen forests. One individual was found from a grassy bog above the tree line. The altitudinal range, based on just two localities, is 2,963–3,330 m (9,721–10,925 ft) asl. Threats to this little known species are unknown but might include wood extraction.
