= Platypelis cowanii =

Conservation status
- Data Deficient (IUCN 3.1)

Scientific classification
- Kingdom: Animalia
- Phylum: Chordata
- Class: Amphibia
- Order: Anura
- Family: Microhylidae
- Subfamily: Cophylinae
- Genus: Platypelis
- Species: P. cowanii

Binomial name
- Platypelis cowanii Boulenger, 1882

Species of frog

Platypelis cowanii is a species of frog in the family Microhylidae. It is endemic to Madagascar. Its natural habitat is subtropical or tropical moist montane forests.

== Sources ==
- IUCN SSC Amphibian Specialist Group (2016). "Cophyla cowanii". IUCN Red List of Threatened Species. 2016 e.T57956A84179347. doi:10.2305/IUCN.UK.2016-1.RLTS.T57956A84179347.en.
