= Hylarana margariana =

Conservation status
- Data Deficient (IUCN 3.1)

Scientific classification
- Kingdom: Animalia
- Phylum: Chordata
- Class: Amphibia
- Order: Anura
- Family: Ranidae
- Genus: Hylarana
- Species: H. margariana

Binomial name
- Hylarana margariana Anderson, 1879

Synonyms
- Rana margariana (Anderson, 1879 "1878")

Species of frog

Hylarana margariana, commonly known as the Irrawaddy frog, is a species of frog in the family Ranidae. It is native to Myanmar and may be present in China.
