= Telmatobius halli =

Conservation status
- Data Deficient (IUCN 3.1)

Scientific classification
- Kingdom: Animalia
- Phylum: Chordata
- Class: Amphibia
- Order: Anura
- Family: Telmatobiidae
- Genus: Telmatobius
- Species: T. halli

Binomial name
- Telmatobius halli Noble, 1938

Species of amphibian

Telmatobius halli is a species of frog in the family Telmatobiidae. It is endemic to northern Chile and only known from its type locality near Ollagüe. The specific name halli honors Frank Gregory Hall, an American specialist on the effects of high altitudes on human body and collector of the type series. Its common name is Hall's water frog.

== Taxonomy ==
Multiple phylogenetic studies indicate that this species, the possibly extinct in the wild Telmatobius dankoi, and the possibly extinct Telmatobius vilamensis may all be conspecific with one another.

== Description ==
The type series includes six adult females measuring 42–57 mm (1.7–2.2 in) in snout–vent length. No males were collected. The head is narrower than the body but broader than it is long. The snout is truncate in dorsal view. No tympanum is present and the supratympanic fold is barely visible. The fingers have rounded tips and no webbing, but have rudimentary lateral fringes. The toes have rounded tips and are extensively webbed. Preserved specimens have uniformly brown to tan The dorsum. There are minute paler specks on the flanks. The venter is pale cream. The finger and toe tips are yellow. Color in life is unknown.

The largest tadpoles are 83 mm (3.3 in) in total length and have long, pointed tails.

Telmatobius halli are strictly aquatic and can survive on land for only five minutes.

Telmatobius halli is only known from its type locality near Ollagüe.

== Habitat and conservation ==
Telmatobius halli is only known from its type series, which was collected in 1935 at 3,000 m (10,000 ft) above sea level (contemporary sources give altitude as 3,700 m (12,100 ft) or 2,000–3,400 m (6,600–11,200 ft)). The species was discovered in a small concrete swimming pool created by damming a hot spring.

For many years, a number of searches were conducted, but no new specimens could be found. In 2018, the species was claimed to have been rediscovered by Fibla et al., with their phylogenetic study reassigning the southernmost populations of Telmatobius chusmisensis to T. halli. In 2020, Cuevas et al. claimed to have discovered a Telmatobius halli in a tiny hot spring oasis near Ollagüe in the Atacama Desert. However, Correa (2021) refuted both findings, with both frog populations being distinct taxa from one another and being related to other Telmatobius species, not T. halli. Correa also identified the true type locality of the species as being at Miño, an abandoned mining camp located near the source of the Loa River, where no Telmatobius populations had been described since the original specimens. In late 2020, an expedition to the type locality found a Telmatobius population, which was determined to be T. halli, thus marking the true rediscovery of the species. If T. dankoi and T. vilamensis are in fact conspecific with T. halli, then T. halli may have had a wider range than previously thought.
