= Hildebrandtia ornatissima =

Conservation status
- Data Deficient (IUCN 3.1)

Scientific classification
- Kingdom: Animalia
- Phylum: Chordata
- Class: Amphibia
- Order: Anura
- Family: Ptychadenidae
- Genus: Hildebrandtia
- Species: H. ornatissima

Binomial name
- Hildebrandtia ornatissima (Bocage, 1879)

Species of frog

Hildebrandtia ornatissima is a species of frog in the family Ptychadenidae. It is endemic to Angola. Its natural habitats are dry savanna, moist savanna, intermittent freshwater lakes, and intermittent freshwater marshes.
