= Pristimantis mondolfii =

Conservation status
- Data Deficient (IUCN 3.1)

Scientific classification
- Kingdom: Animalia
- Phylum: Chordata
- Class: Amphibia
- Order: Anura
- Clade: Brachycephaloidea
- Family: Craugastoridae
- Genus: Pristimantis
- Species: P. mondolfii

Binomial name
- Pristimantis mondolfii (Rivero, 1984)

Synonyms
- Eleutherodactylus mondolfii Rivero, 1984 "1982"

Species of amphibian

Pristimantis mondolfii is a species of frog in the family Strabomantidae.

It is endemic to Venezuela where it is only known from its type locality, Matamula in Delicias, Táchira, western Venezuela. Its natural habitat is tropical seasonal (semi-deciduous) forest. It is probably affected by habitat loss caused by coffee plantations.
