= Paratelmatobius segallai =

Conservation status
- Data Deficient (IUCN 3.1)

Scientific classification
- Kingdom: Animalia
- Phylum: Chordata
- Class: Amphibia
- Order: Anura
- Family: Leptodactylidae
- Genus: Paratelmatobius
- Species: P. segallai

Binomial name
- Paratelmatobius segallai Santos, Oliveira, Carvalho, Zaidan, Silva, Berneck, and Garcia, 2019

Species of frog

Paratelmatobius segallai is a species of frog in the family Leptodactylidae. It is endemic to Brazil.

== Habitat ==
People have observed this frog on the leaf litter of montane forests. Scientists have observed this frog between 1,036 and 1,040 metres (3,400 and 3,410 ft) above sea level.

Scientists have reported this frog in one protected area, Parque Estadual Pico do Marumbi.

== Reproduction ==
Scientists believe this frog is an explosive breeder, reproducing after heavy rain. Scientists heard male frogs calling to female frogs near temporary pools. The female frogs deposit eggs in still water, where the tadpoles develop.

== Threats ==
The IUCN classifies this species as data deficient. Scientists reported it in a protected park, which is not subject to urbanization or conversion to farmland.
