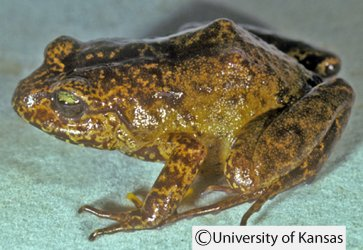

Conservation status
- Data Deficient (IUCN 3.1)

Scientific classification
- Kingdom: Animalia
- Phylum: Chordata
- Class: Amphibia
- Order: Anura
- Family: Strabomantidae
- Genus: Lynchius
- Species: L. flavomaculatus

Binomial name
- Lynchius flavomaculatus (Parker, 1938)

Synonyms
- Phrynopus flavomaculatus (Parker, 1938); Eleutherodactylus flavomaculatus Parker, 1938

= Lynchius flavomaculatus =

Species of frog

Lynchius flavomaculatus, also known as the yellow-spotted Andes frog, is a species of frog in the family Strabomantidae. It is found in the Andes of southern Ecuador and northern Peru.

== Description ==
Adult males measure 24–35 mm (0.9–1.4 in) and adult females 35–44 mm (1.4–1.7 in) in snout–vent length. The snout is rounded. The tympanum is distinct. The fingers are long and slender and lack webbing and lateral fringes; the tips are narrowly round and the fingers I–II have pads. Also the toes lack webbing and lateral fringes; they have narrowly rounded tips. Skin on dorsum of head, body, and limbs is shagreen; there are few scattered tubercles, particularly posteriorly. The dorsum is mottled dark yellow and reddish brown. There are indistinct yellow bars on the limbs, head, and upper lips, as well as dark brown transversal bars on the limbs. The flanks are yellow and have brown spots. The venter is grayish brown. There are yellow blotches on the belly, ventral surfaces of limbs, groin, and anterior surfaces of thighs. The iris is pale green and has black reticulations.

== Habitat and conservation ==
Lynchius flavomaculatus lives in the páramo habitats at the elevations of 2,215–3,200 m (7,267–10,499 ft) asl. It is a terrestrial frog that probably has direct development (i.e., there is no free-living larval stage). It is a rare species that is threatened by habitat destruction and degradation caused by agriculture and non-timber plantations, potentially also fires. It occurs in the Podocarpus National Park.
