= Pristimantis bearsei =

Conservation status
- Data Deficient (IUCN 3.1)

Scientific classification
- Kingdom: Animalia
- Phylum: Chordata
- Class: Amphibia
- Order: Anura
- Family: Strabomantidae
- Genus: Pristimantis
- Species: P. bearsei

Binomial name
- Pristimantis bearsei (Duellman, 1992)

Synonyms
- Eleutherodactylus bearsei Duellman, 1992

Species of frog

Pristimantis bearsei is a species of frog in the family Strabomantidae. It is endemic to Peru and only known from the region of its type locality northeast of Tarapoto in the San Martín Region. Common name Bearse's robber frog has been coined for this species.

== Etymology ==
The specific name bearsei honours Robert Carleton Bearse, an American physicist. As the Associate Vice Chancellor of the University of Kansas, his administration enhanced the programs of the University of Kansas Natural History Museum.

== Description ==
Pristimantis bearsei males measure 23–26 mm (0.91–1.02 in) and females about 38–39 mm (1.5–1.5 in) in snout–vent length. The dorsum is shagreen and brown with darker brown marks on back and transverse bars on limbs. The venter is brown with cream flecks. The tympanum is prominent. The toes have lateral fringes but no webbing. Males have vocal slits.

== Habitat and conservation ==
Pristimantis bearsei occur in lower humid montane forest at elevations of 500–730 m (1,640–2,400 ft) above sea level close to streams. Adults have been found on mossy boulders, and some juveniles also on herbaceous vegetation. The species is threatened by habitat loss. Its range overlaps with the Cordillera Azul National Park.
