= Pristimantis cuneirostris =

Conservation status
- Data Deficient (IUCN 3.1)

Scientific classification
- Kingdom: Animalia
- Phylum: Chordata
- Class: Amphibia
- Order: Anura
- Clade: Brachycephaloidea
- Family: Craugastoridae
- Genus: Pristimantis
- Species: P. cuneirostris

Binomial name
- Pristimantis cuneirostris (Duellman & Pramuk, 1999)

Synonyms
- Eleutherodactylus cuneirostris Duellman & Pramuk, 1999

Species of frog

Pristimantis cuneirostris is a species of frog in the family Craugastoridae. It is endemic to Peru where it is only known from its type locality near La Peca, Bagua Province, in the Amazonas Region of northern Peru. Its natural habitat is tropical moist montane forests.
