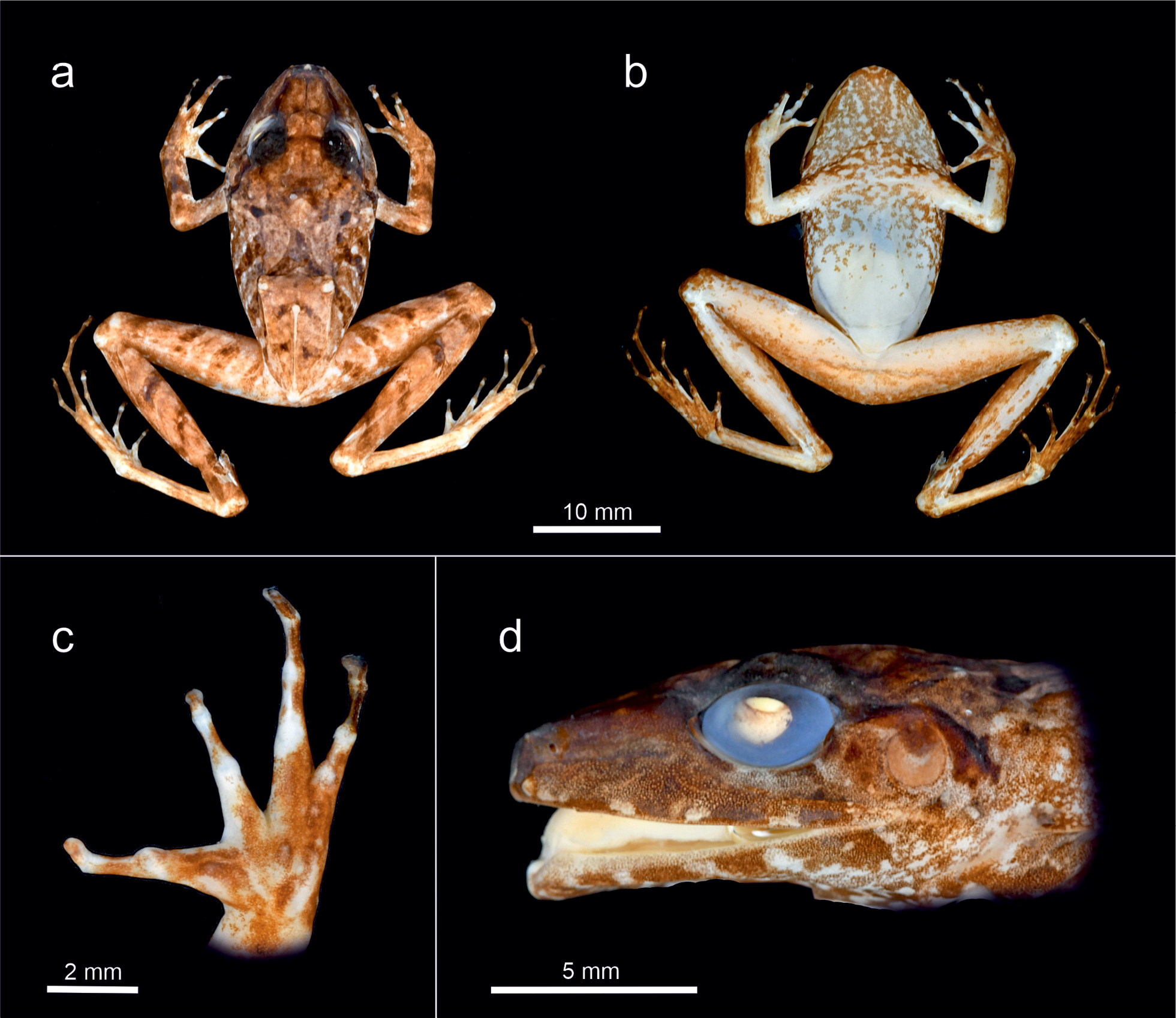
- Preserved holotype

Conservation status
- Data Deficient (IUCN 3.1)

Scientific classification
- Kingdom: Animalia
- Phylum: Chordata
- Class: Amphibia
- Order: Anura
- Family: Strabomantidae
- Genus: Pristimantis
- Species: P. nebulosus

Binomial name
- Pristimantis nebulosus (Henle, 1992)
- Pristimantis nebulosus is only known from the Cordillera Azul on central Peru

Synonyms
- Eleutherodactylus nebulosus Henle, 1992; Eleutherodactylus caliginosus Lynch, 1996; Pristimantis caliginosus (Lynch, 1996)

= Pristimantis nebulosus =

Species of frog

Pristimantis nebulosus, also known as the Huanuco robber frog, is a species of frog in the family Strabomantidae. It is endemic to Peru and only known from its type locality in the southern Cordillera Azul, Huánuco Region.

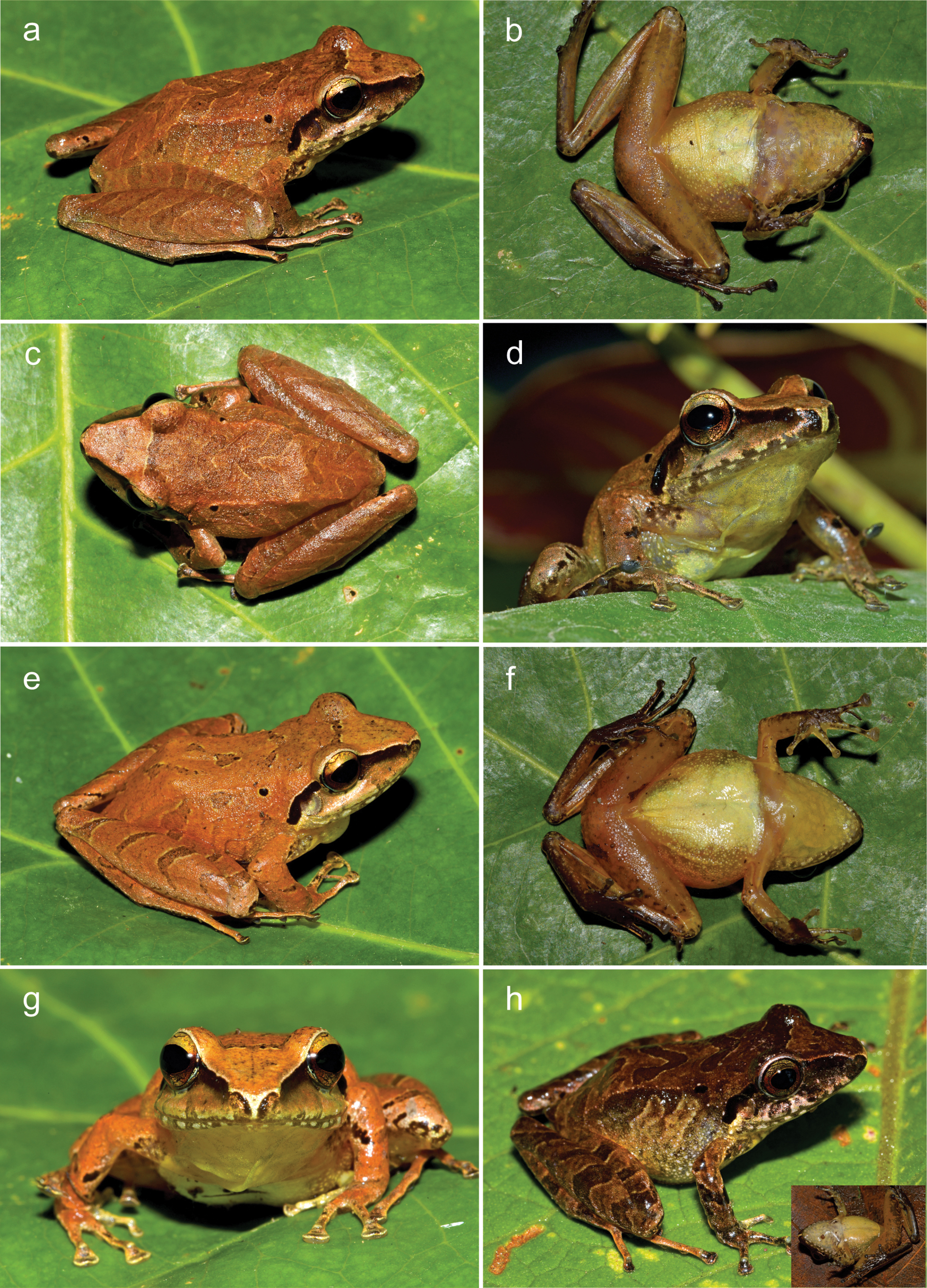
Pristimantis nebulosus in life. Panels show two adult males from different angles and one juvenile (bottom right).

== Description ==
Adult males measure 27.7–29.1 mm (1.1–1.1 in) in snout–vent length. The head is slightly longer than it is wide. The snout is subacuminate in dorsal view and rounded in lateral profile. The tympanum is distinct, surrounded from above by the prominent supratympanic fold. The fingers and toes are long and slender. Skin is dorsally and laterally shagreen. The dorsolateral folds are weakly developed. Dorsal coloration is generally brown of different shades, possibly with orange to reddish tint. The dorsum has dark brown chevrons or irregular flecks, outlined with cream. The head has various dark-brown markings, including an inter-orbital bar. The limbs have dark brown bars. The belly is yellowish-cream while the throat is yellow or yellowish-cream, mottled with grey spots.

The male advertisement call consists of a single regularly pulsed note that is repeated at a rather regular succession in short call series. The dominant frequency is 3190–3360 Hz.

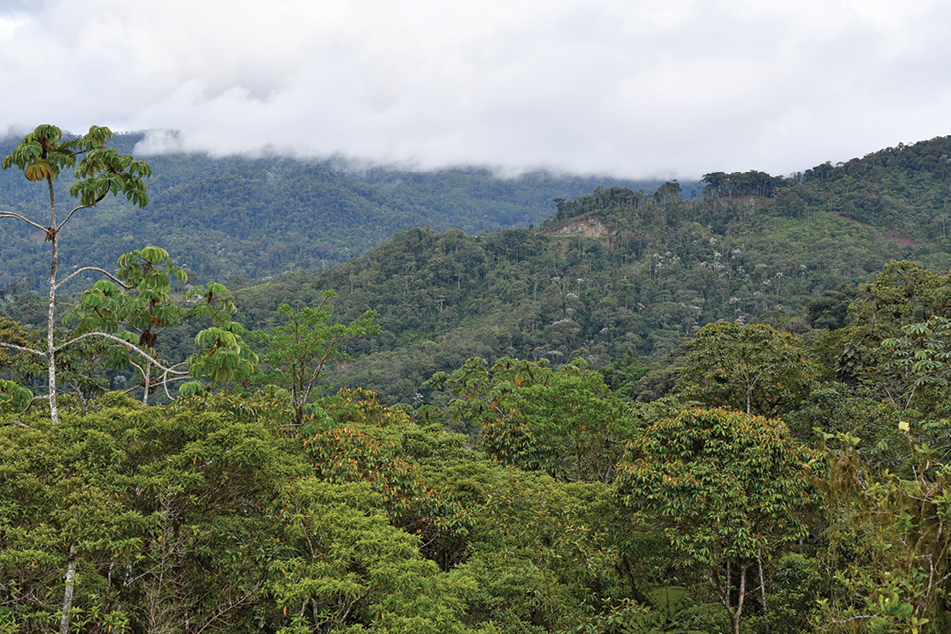
Habitat at the type locality

== Habitat and conservation ==
Pristimantis nebulosus is known from an area of evergreen montane rainforest at about 1,650 m (5,410 ft) above sea level. The area has been altered by plantations. In 2019, specimens were found in disturbed habitat along a narrow dirt road. Males were calling from a bushy area—one male called from near the ground, while another one was sitting on a leaf some 30 cm (1 ft) above the ground. Development is direct (i.e., there is no free-living larval stage).

Threats to this species are unknown. Its range might extend into the Cordillera Azul National Park.
