= Asterophrys eurydactyla =

Conservation status
- Data Deficient (IUCN 3.1)

Scientific classification
- Kingdom: Animalia
- Phylum: Chordata
- Class: Amphibia
- Order: Anura
- Family: Microhylidae
- Genus: Asterophrys
- Species: A. eurydactyla

Binomial name
- Asterophrys eurydactyla (Zweifel, 1972)

Synonyms
- Phrynomantis eurydactyla Zweifel, 1972; Callulops eurydactylus — Dubois, 1988; Pseudocallulops eurydactylus — Günther, 2009

Species of frog

Asterophrys eurydactyla is a species of frog in the family Microhylidae. It is endemic to New Guinea and known from the Onin Peninsula in Western New Guinea (Indonesia), and from the Star Mountains in the Western Province in Papua New Guinea, close to the border with Western New Guinea; there are some doubts whether this easternmost record is conspecific with A. eurydactyla. Common name Danowaria callulops frog has been proposed for this species.

Asterophrys eurydactyla occurs in tropical lowland, hill, and montane rainforests, including a limestone cave. It is known from elevations between 70 and 1,600 m (230 and 5,250 ft) above sea level. There are no known major threats to this species. It is not known to occur in any protected areas.
