= Pristimantis cabrerai =

Conservation status
- Data Deficient (IUCN 3.1)

Scientific classification
- Kingdom: Animalia
- Phylum: Chordata
- Class: Amphibia
- Order: Anura
- Clade: Brachycephaloidea
- Family: Craugastoridae
- Genus: Pristimantis
- Species: P. cabrerai

Binomial name
- Pristimantis cabrerai (Cochran and Goin, 1970)

Synonyms
- Eleutherodactylus surdus cabrerai ssp. cabrerai Cochran and Goin, 1970; Eleutherodactylus cabrerai Cochran and Goin, 1970

Species of frog

Pristimantis cabrerai is a species of frog in the family Strabomantidae. It is endemic to Colombia and is known from the Cordillera Occidental in Antioquia and Caldas Departments. Although common name Valle robber frog has been suggested for it, the specimen from Valle del Cauca is no longer assigned to this species.

== Etymology ==
The specific name cabrerai honours Mr. Isodore Cabrera, a Colombian naturalist and collector.

== Description ==
The species was described based on a series of seven specimens from Antioquia. The holotype is an adult female measuring 37 mm (1.5 in) in snout–vent length (sizes of other specimens were not specified). The canthus rostralis is rounded but distinct. The eye is relatively large and prominent. The ear is complete but concealed, with only a depression where tympanum would normally be located. Fingers and toes are fairly long; the toes have traces of webbing. Skin of the upper parts is pustular.

== Habitat and conservation ==
The species' natural habitats are secondary montane and mature forests at elevations of 1,140–2,450 m (3,740–8,040 ft) above sea level. It occurs among fallen leaves and in branches and leaves of low herbaceous vegetation. It is an uncommon species threatened by habitat loss.
