= Pristimantis pataikos =

Conservation status
- Data Deficient (IUCN 3.1)

Scientific classification
- Kingdom: Animalia
- Phylum: Chordata
- Class: Amphibia
- Order: Anura
- Clade: Brachycephaloidea
- Family: Craugastoridae
- Genus: Pristimantis
- Species: P. pataikos

Binomial name
- Pristimantis pataikos (Duellman & Pramuk, 1999)

Synonyms
- Eleutherodactylus pataikos Duellman & Pramuk, 1999

Species of frog

Pristimantis pataikos is a species of frog in the family Strabomantidae. It is known from two locations, one in the Amazonas Region in northern Peru and the other one in nearby Zamora-Chinchipe Province in southern Ecuador. Its natural habitat is tropical moist montane forest at elevations of 1,800–3,470 m (5,910–11,380 ft) asl. It is threatened by habitat loss. The location in Ecuador is within the Podocarpus National Park.
