= Turkestanian salamander =

Conservation status
- Data Deficient (IUCN 3.1)

Scientific classification
- Kingdom: Animalia
- Phylum: Chordata
- Class: Amphibia
- Order: Urodela
- Family: Hynobiidae
- Genus: Hynobius
- Species: H. turkestanicus

Binomial name
- Hynobius turkestanicus Nikolsky, 1909

Species of amphibian

The Turkestanian salamander (Hynobius turkestanicus) is a species of salamander in the family Hynobiidae only once found in 1909 (4 animals) in Central Asia somewhere "in Turkestan between Samarkand and Pamir" which can be in Tajikistan, Uzbekistan or Kyrgyzstan. Since then the species has not been seen in the wild. None remain in captivity. The Turkestanian salamander is currently on the list of the 10 Most Wanted Amphibians, a rediscovery effort launched by Conservation International.
