= San Matías–San Carlos Protection Forest =

National forest located in Pasco Region, Peru

- Bosque de Protección San Matías-San Carlos
- IUCN category VI (protected area with sustainable use of natural resources)
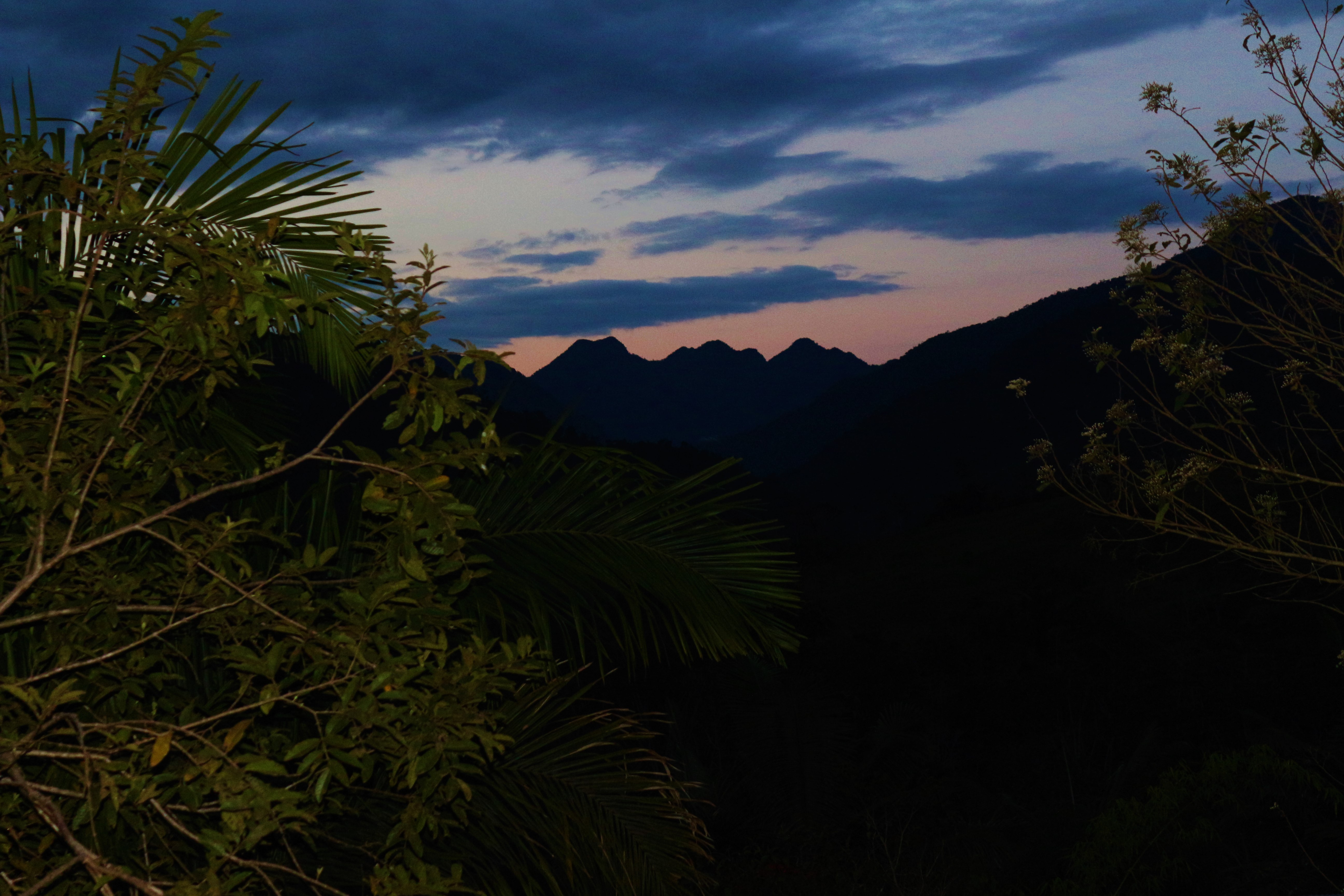

- Location within Peru
- Location: Pasco Region, Peru
- Coordinates: 10°33′32″S 74°59′35″W
- Area: 1,458 km^{2} (563 mi^{2})
- Established: 1987

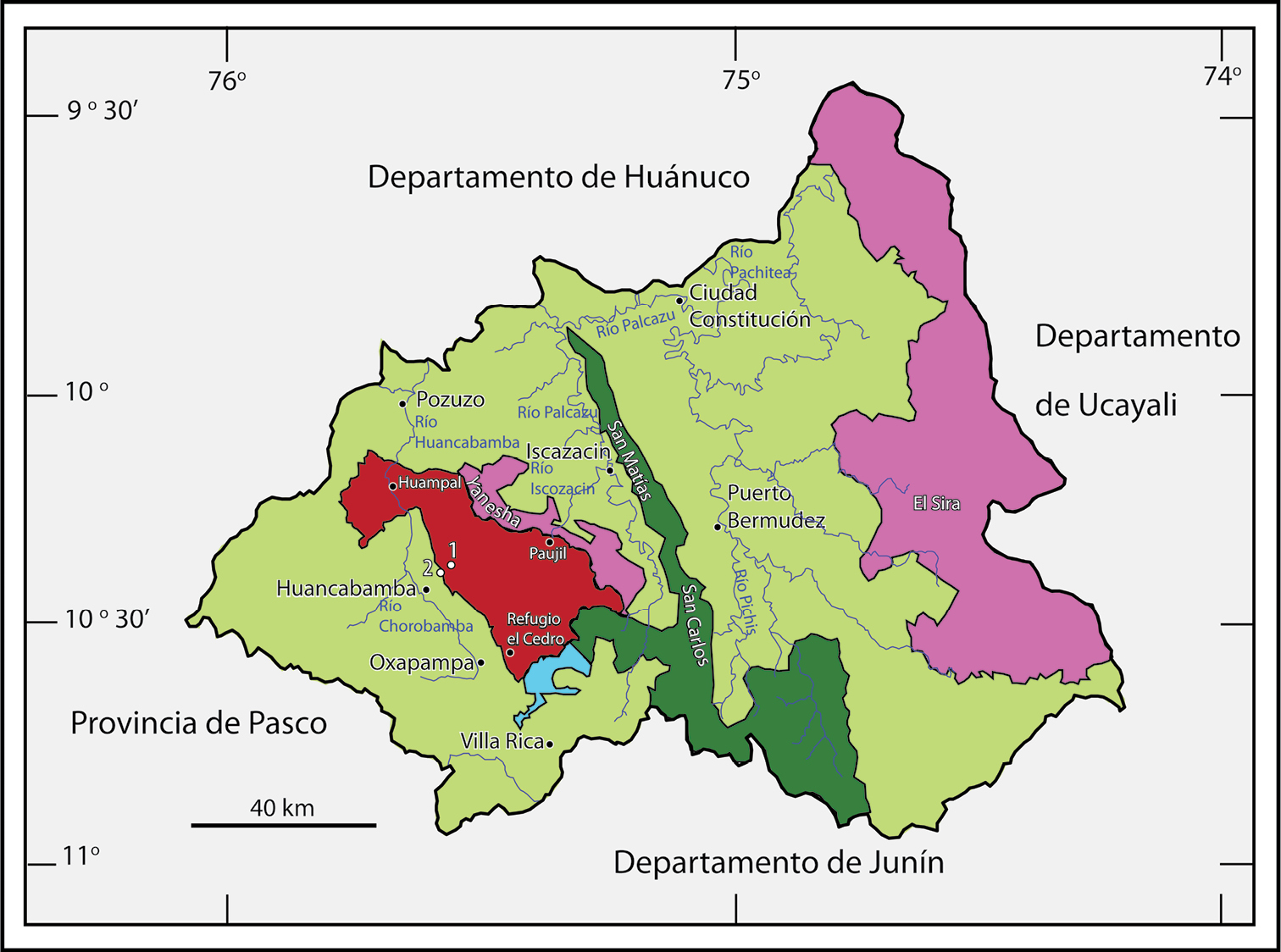
San Matías–San Carlos Protection Forest (in dark green)

The San Matías–San Carlos Protection Forest (Bosque de Protección San Matías-San Carlos) is a national forest situated in Pasco Region, Peru. It is a forest set aside to preserve the soils and to protect infrastructure, towns, and agricultural grounds against the effects of the water erosion, huaycos, streams or floods. It lies within the Peruvian Yungas and Ucayali moist forests ecoregions.

It also allows for the maintenance and development of the cultural values of the native communities, such as the Ashaninkas, and Yaneshas.

The San Matías–San Carlos Protection Forest is also part of the Oxapampa-Asháninka-Yánesha Biosphere Reserve, functioning as a corridor of highland habitats within the broader Amazonian lowlands. This positioning supports the distribution of various high-altitude species such as the spectacled bear (Tremarctos ornatus), the northern pudu (Pudu mephistophiles), and the Andean cock-of-the-rock (Rupicola peruvianus). Its location in a water recharge zone also benefits the hydrology of the Pichis and Palcazu river sub-basins.

The forest extends across elevations from 300 to 2,250 metres and includes varied ecosystems, from lowland rainforests to cloud forests rich in ferns, orchids, and epiphytes. It supports a wide range of fauna, including the giant otter, jaguar, and several primate and bird species, as well as valuable flora such as mahogany and the medicinal plant cat's claw (Uncaria tomentosa).

== See also ==
- Natural and Cultural Peruvian Heritage
