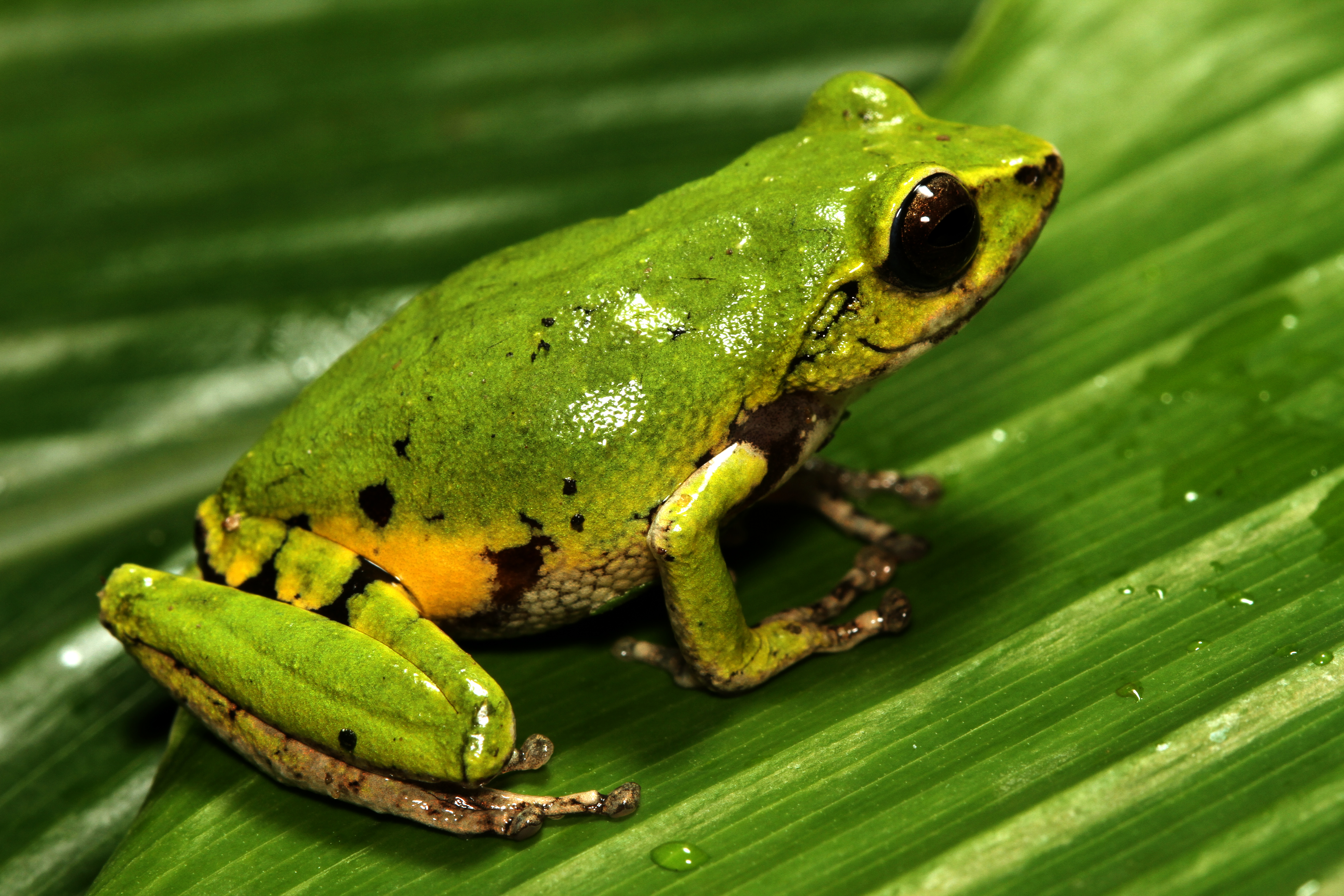

Conservation status
- Vulnerable (IUCN 3.1)

Scientific classification
- Kingdom: Animalia
- Phylum: Chordata
- Class: Amphibia
- Order: Anura
- Family: Rhacophoridae
- Genus: Raorchestes
- Species: R. chromasynchysi

Binomial name
- Raorchestes chromasynchysi (Biju & Bossuyt, 2009)

Synonyms
- Philautus chromasynchysi Biju and Bossuyt, 2009; Pseudophilautus chromasynchysi Biju & Bossuyt, 2009

= Raorchestes chromasynchysi =

Confusing green bushfrog

Species of frog

Raorchestes chromasynchysi, also known as the confusing green bushfrog or confusing green bush frog, is a species of frog found in the Western Ghats of Kerala and Karnataka in India. It has been observed between 800 and 1500 meters above sea level.

This frog is found in evergreen shola forests. For a long time, scientists believed that this frog was hypersensitive to noise disturbance, but it has since been observed at roadsides. It has also been observed in coffee and cardamom plantations. Like other frogs in Raorchestes, this frog breeds through direct development.

Scientists classify this frog as vulnerable because of its limited, fragmented range, and because of ongoing threats from agricultural encroachment.

== Original description ==
- Biju SD; Bossuyt F (2009). "Systematics and phylogeny of Philautus Gistel, 1848 (Anura, Rhacophoridae) in the Western Ghats of India, with descriptions of 12 new species". Zool J Linn Soc (Abstract). 155 (2): 374–444. doi:10.1111/j.1096-3642.2008.00466.x.
