= Ichthyophis billitonensis =

Conservation status
- Data Deficient (IUCN 3.1)

Scientific classification
- Kingdom: Animalia
- Phylum: Chordata
- Class: Amphibia
- Order: Gymnophiona
- Clade: Apoda
- Family: Ichthyophiidae
- Genus: Ichthyophis
- Species: I. billitonensis

Binomial name
- Ichthyophis billitonensis Taylor, 1965
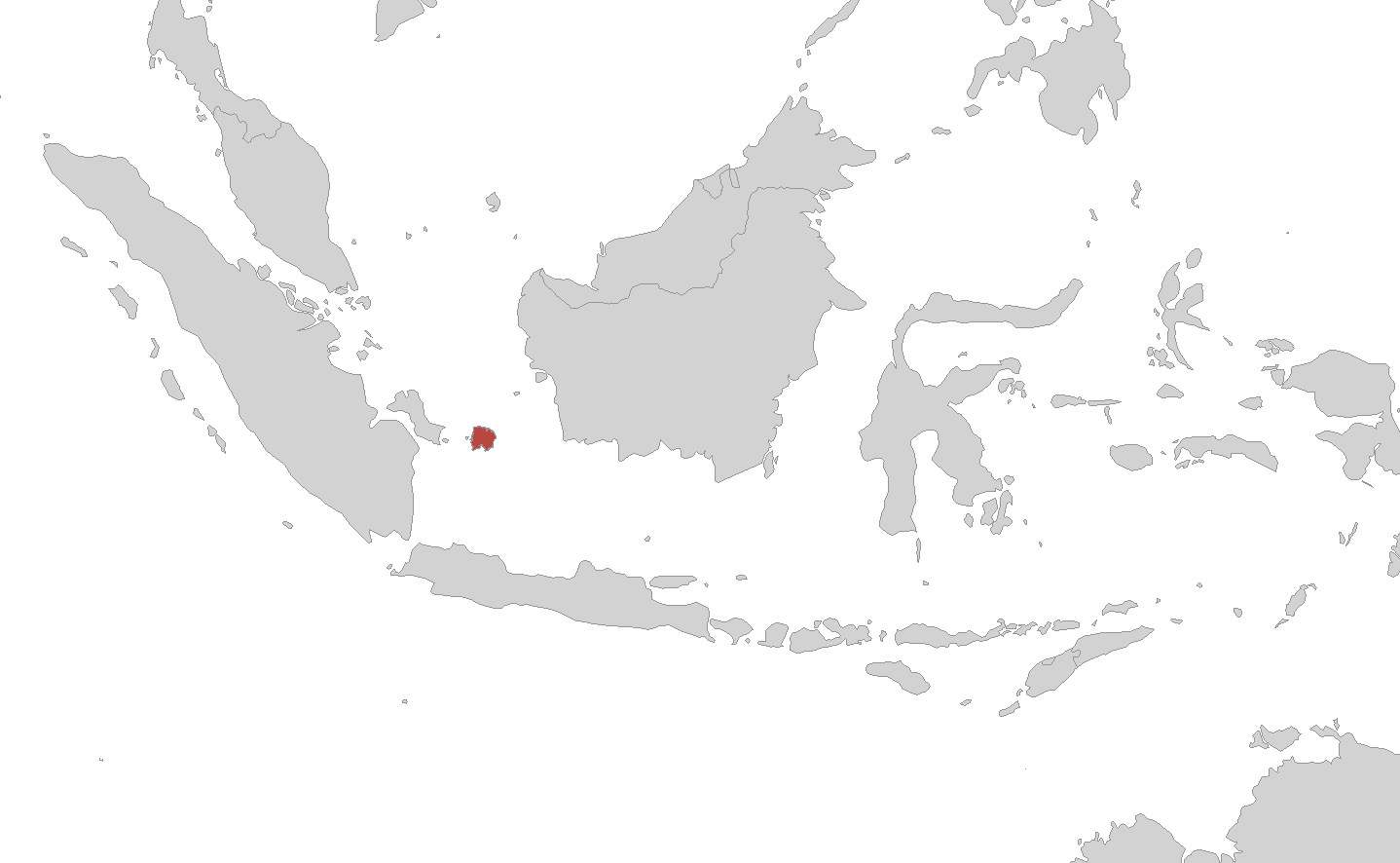
- Billiton Island caecilian range

Species of amphibian

Ichthyophis billitonensis, the Billiton Island caecilian, is a species of amphibian in the family Ichthyophiidae endemic to the Indonesian island of Belitung. It was rediscovered in 2022 from Gunung Tajam, Belitung, after not having been recorded since the original description of the species in 1965. This appears to be a small species, measuring 135 mm (5.3 in) in total length. Habitat requirements are unknown but it probably inhabits moist lowland forests. It may be threatened by habitat loss caused by opencast tin mining.

== Taxonomy ==
Ichthyophis billitonensis was formally described in 1965 by the American herpetologist Edward Harrison Taylor based on a specimen from Belitung Island, Indonesia. The species is named after the island, which was historically spelled "Billiton". Taylor postulated that the species' may be closely related to the glutinosus group within its genus due to similarities in their appearance, although he also stated that it was like the monochrous group in lacking a stripe along its side.

== Description ==
The Billiton Island caecilian is largely brown in its appearance, lighter on the belly and dark brown collars. The head is olive brown and the eye is surrounded by a pale ring. There is no stripe along its sides. The caecilian is fairly small, measuring 110–135 mm (4.3–5.3 in) in length as an adult. The head is shaped like a cone and has upward-facing nostrils.

== Distribution and habitat ==
The Billiton Island caecilian is endemic to the Indonesian island of Belitung, located in the northern Java Sea. Like most other caecilians, the adults of the species are fossorial, living in leaf-litter-covered soil in moist tropical forests. Eggs are laid on land, with larvae moving to water after hatching. The species was rediscovered after over 50 years on Gunung Tajam, the tallest mountain on Belitung. Extensive deforestation has cleared much of Belitung's lowland forest and Gunung Tajam has the only remaining suitable habitat on the island.

== Conservation ==
The most recent assessment of the Billiton Island caecilian by the International Union for Conservation of Nature for its IUCN Red List was conducted in 2018, prior to the species' rediscovery. At that time, the IUCN classified the species as being Data Deficient due to the paucity of information on all aspects of its ecology, as well as doubts about whether it was a valid species in the first place. Subsequent to its description in 1965, the caecilian was not seen again for over 50 years, with a second specimen only being collected in 2022. Possible threats to the species are habitat loss caused by opencast tin mining and the expansion of oil palm plantations on Belitung. Further research into the species' distribution and habitat preferences is required to more clearly understand how severe a threat these factors pose to it.
