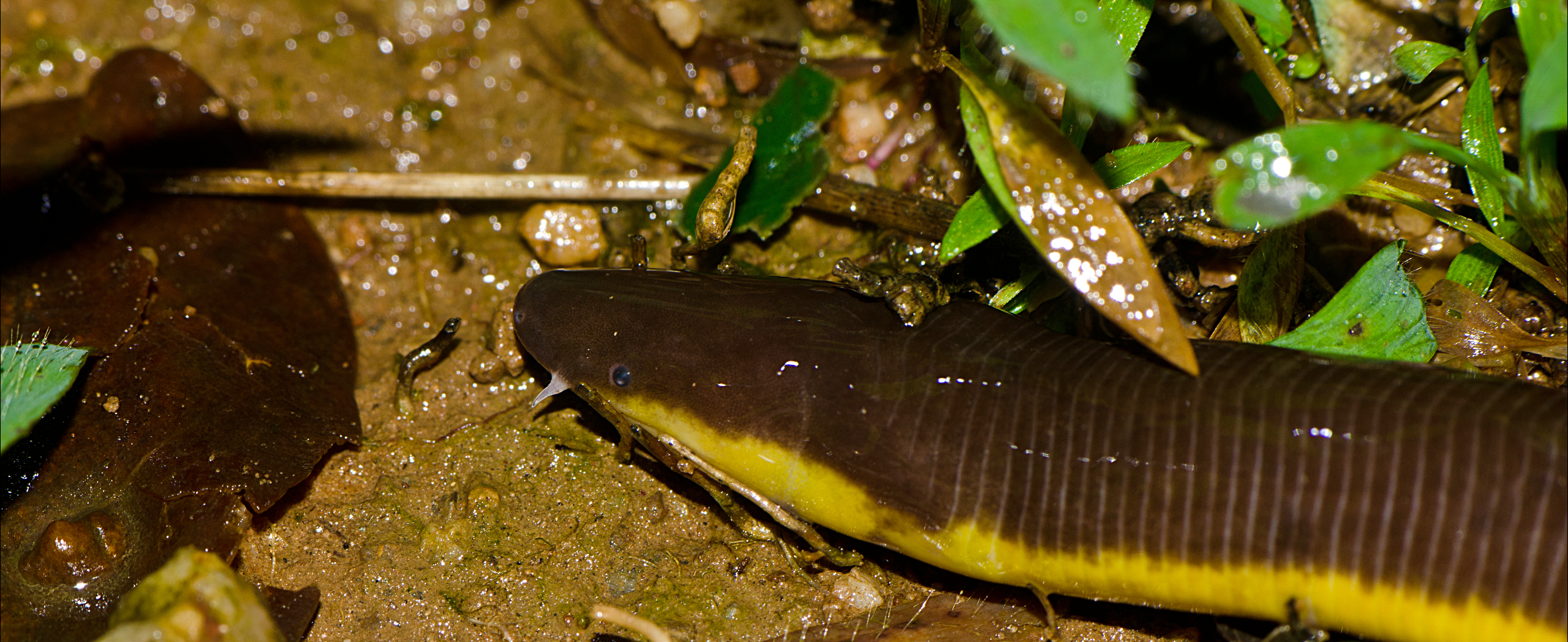

Scientific classification
- Kingdom: Animalia
- Phylum: Chordata
- Class: Amphibia
- Order: Gymnophiona
- Clade: Apoda
- Family: Ichthyophiidae
- Genus: Ichthyophis
- Species: I. davidi

Binomial name
- Ichthyophis davidi Bhatta, Dinesh, Prashanth, Kulkarni & Radhakrishnan, 2011

= Ichthyophis davidi =

Species of amphibian

Ichthyophis davidi, the Chorla giant striped caecilian, is a new caecilian species of India discovered in Chorla, a village situated on the borders of Goa, Maharashtra, and Karnataka in the Mhadei region of India. It is one of the largest known limbless, yellow-striped caecilians from the Western Ghats. It is named in honour of David Gower, department of zoology, Natural History Museum, London, in recognition of his contributions to Indian caecilian studies. The discovery was made by researchers Gopalakrishna Bhatta of the department of biology, BASE Educational Services Private Limited, Bengaluru; K. P. Dinesh and C. Radhakrishnan of western ghats regional centre, Calicut; P. Prashanth of Agumbe Rainforest Research Station, Agumbe; and Nirmal Kulkarni of Mhadei Research Centre, Chorla Ghat.
