= Ichthyophis pseudangularis =

Conservation status
- Vulnerable (IUCN 3.1)

Scientific classification
- Kingdom: Animalia
- Phylum: Chordata
- Class: Amphibia
- Order: Gymnophiona
- Clade: Apoda
- Family: Ichthyophiidae
- Genus: Ichthyophis
- Species: I. pseudangularis

Binomial name
- Ichthyophis pseudangularis Taylor, 1965
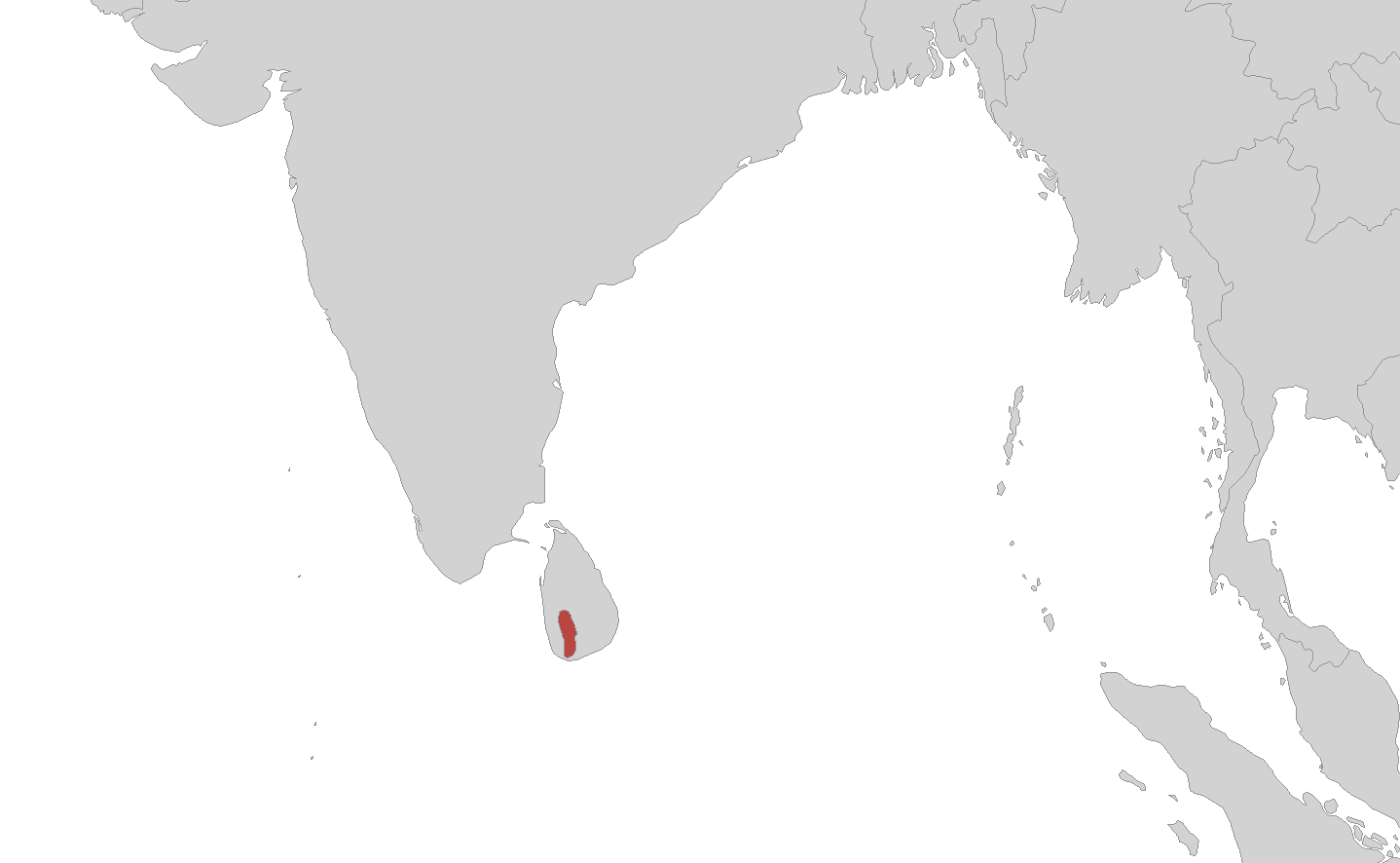
- Ichthyophis pseudangularis range

Species of amphibian

Ichthyophis pseudangularis is a species of caecilian endemic to Sri Lanka. It is found in a range of natural and man-made habitats: forests, rubber plantations, paddy fields, rural gardens and farms, wetlands (boggy and muddy areas), and pastureland.

The holotype measured 225 mm (8.9 in) in total length.
