= Ichthyophis youngorum =

Conservation status
- Data Deficient (IUCN 3.1)

Scientific classification
- Kingdom: Animalia
- Phylum: Chordata
- Class: Amphibia
- Order: Gymnophiona
- Clade: Apoda
- Family: Ichthyophiidae
- Genus: Ichthyophis
- Species: I. youngorum

Binomial name
- Ichthyophis youngorum Taylor, 1960

Species of amphibian

Ichthyophis youngorum, commonly named the Chiang Mai Caecilian or Doi Suthep caecilian, is a species of amphibian in the family Ichthyophiidae. It is known only from 10 adult and 13 larval specimens collected on July 12, 1957 by Edward Harrison Taylor. They were collected in the rainforest of Doi Suthep, near Chiang Mai, in Thailand, in a small valley at 1,200 m (3,900 ft) above sea level.

== Description ==
Of the 10 adults collected, the largest was 220mm in length, with 106-107 vertebrae. They are described as being a violet-lavender colour above with a grey-white spot near the eye.

Larvae have the same amount of vertebrae as adults, but can be larger, reaching up to 240mm in length. They are also lighter in colour than adults, getting darker as they reach maturity.

== Conservation ==
Ichthyophis youngorum is considered by the IUCN Red List to be "Data deficient", as there has been no species recordings since their discovery in 1957.
