= Pointed-headed caecilian =

Conservation status
- Data Deficient (IUCN 3.1)

Scientific classification
- Kingdom: Animalia
- Phylum: Chordata
- Class: Amphibia
- Order: Gymnophiona
- Clade: Apoda
- Family: Ichthyophiidae
- Genus: Ichthyophis
- Species: I. acuminatus

Binomial name
- Ichthyophis acuminatus Taylor, 1960

Species of amphibian

The pointed-headed caecilian or Me Wang Valley caecilian, (Ichthyophis acuminatus) is a species of amphibian in the family Ichthyophiidae endemic to Thailand. Its natural habitats are subtropical or tropical moist lowland forests, subtropical or tropical moist montane forests, rivers, intermittent rivers, plantations, rural gardens, heavily degraded former forest, irrigated land, and seasonally flooded agricultural land.
