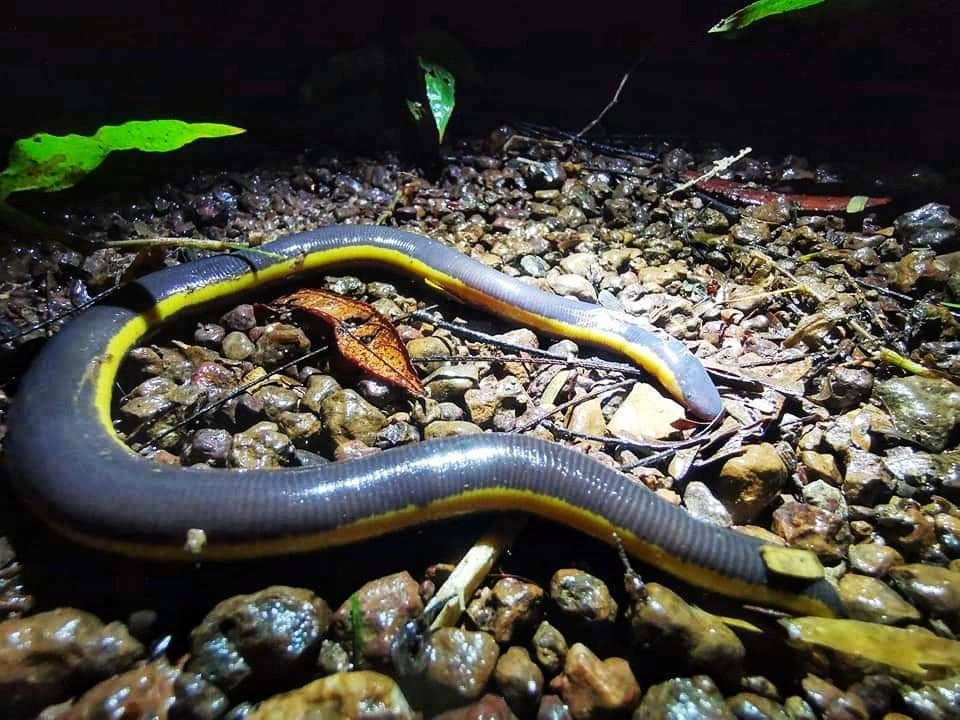

Conservation status
- Least Concern (IUCN 3.1)

Scientific classification
- Kingdom: Animalia
- Phylum: Chordata
- Class: Amphibia
- Order: Gymnophiona
- Clade: Apoda
- Family: Ichthyophiidae
- Genus: Ichthyophis
- Species: I. nguyenorum

Binomial name
- Ichthyophis nguyenorum Nishikawa, Matsui, and Orlov, 2012
- Type locality of Ichthyophis nguyenorum in central Vietnam

= Ichthyophis nguyenorum =

Species of amphibian

Ichthyophis nguyenorum is a species of caecilian in the family Ichthyophiidae. They were first found in Kon Plông District, Kon Tum Province, central Vietnam, in 2006, and formally described in 2012. The species is now also known from the Cat Tien National Park in Đồng Nai and Lâm Đồng provinces, southern Vietnam, and is presumed to occur more widely in suitable habitat in central and southern Vietnam as well as in eastern Cambodia.

== Etymology ==
The specific name I. nguyenorum honours two Vietnamese herpetologists, Nguyen Quang Truong and Nguyen Thien Tao, who are brothers. The common name Nguyen's caecilian (Ếch giun Nguyễn - literally "worm frog" in Vietnamese) has been coined for this species.

== Description ==
The type series consists of three adult females that measure 257–307 mm (10.1–12.1 in) in total length. The tail is short and blunt, only about 3 mm (0.1 in). The body is cylindrical and slightly depressed dorsoventrally. The eyes are slightly protruding. The tentacles are very close to the edge of the mouth. The head is slightly widened around the jaw angle and narrows anteriorly. The body has 312–318 annuli in total. The annular grooves are dorsally complete but narrowly separate ventrally, except for the last one tenth of body. The body color is uniform slate dorsally and paler, lilac ventrally. A broad and uninterrupted bright yellow lateral stripe runs throughout the body.

== Habitat and conservation ==
Ichthyophis nguyenorum inhabits seasonal tropical forests at elevations of 135–1,200 m (443–3,937 ft) above sea level. The type specimens were collected on the floor of a secondary forest near a farmland, after heavy rain. The larvae live in streams.

Habitat loss and degradation is common within the range of this species, but its sensitivity to forest loss is unknown. It is known to be present in one national park, and its likely range includes several other protected areas.
