= Ichthyophis bernisi =

Conservation status
- Data Deficient (IUCN 3.1)

Scientific classification
- Kingdom: Animalia
- Phylum: Chordata
- Class: Amphibia
- Order: Gymnophiona
- Clade: Apoda
- Family: Ichthyophiidae
- Genus: Ichthyophis
- Species: I. bernisi

Binomial name
- Ichthyophis bernisi Salvador, 1975

Species of amphibian

Ichthyophis bernisi, the Indonesia caecilian or Indonesian caecilian, is a species of amphibian in the family Ichthyophiidae. It is endemic to Java (Indonesia). It is only known from the holotype collected from an unspecified location on Java before 1975. The specific name bernisi honors Francisco Bernis Madrazo, a Spanish ornithologist.

== Description ==
The holotype measures 290 mm (11.4 in) in total length, including the 2.7-mm tail. The body width is 14 mm (0.6 in). The total number of annuli (both primary and secondary) is 298. The eyes are visible. The general coloration is light sienna. A yellowish band runs on the sides, beginning at the second collar and fading on the belly.

== Habitat and conservation ==
There is no specific information on ecology of this species. It is assumed to inhabit tropical rainforest and be oviparous, laying terrestrial eggs that develop into aquatic larvae. There is no information on possible threats to this species.
