= Ichthyophis orthoplicatus =

Conservation status
- Endangered (IUCN 3.1)

Scientific classification
- Kingdom: Animalia
- Phylum: Chordata
- Class: Amphibia
- Order: Gymnophiona
- Clade: Apoda
- Family: Ichthyophiidae
- Genus: Ichthyophis
- Species: I. orthoplicatus

Binomial name
- Ichthyophis orthoplicatus Taylor, 1965
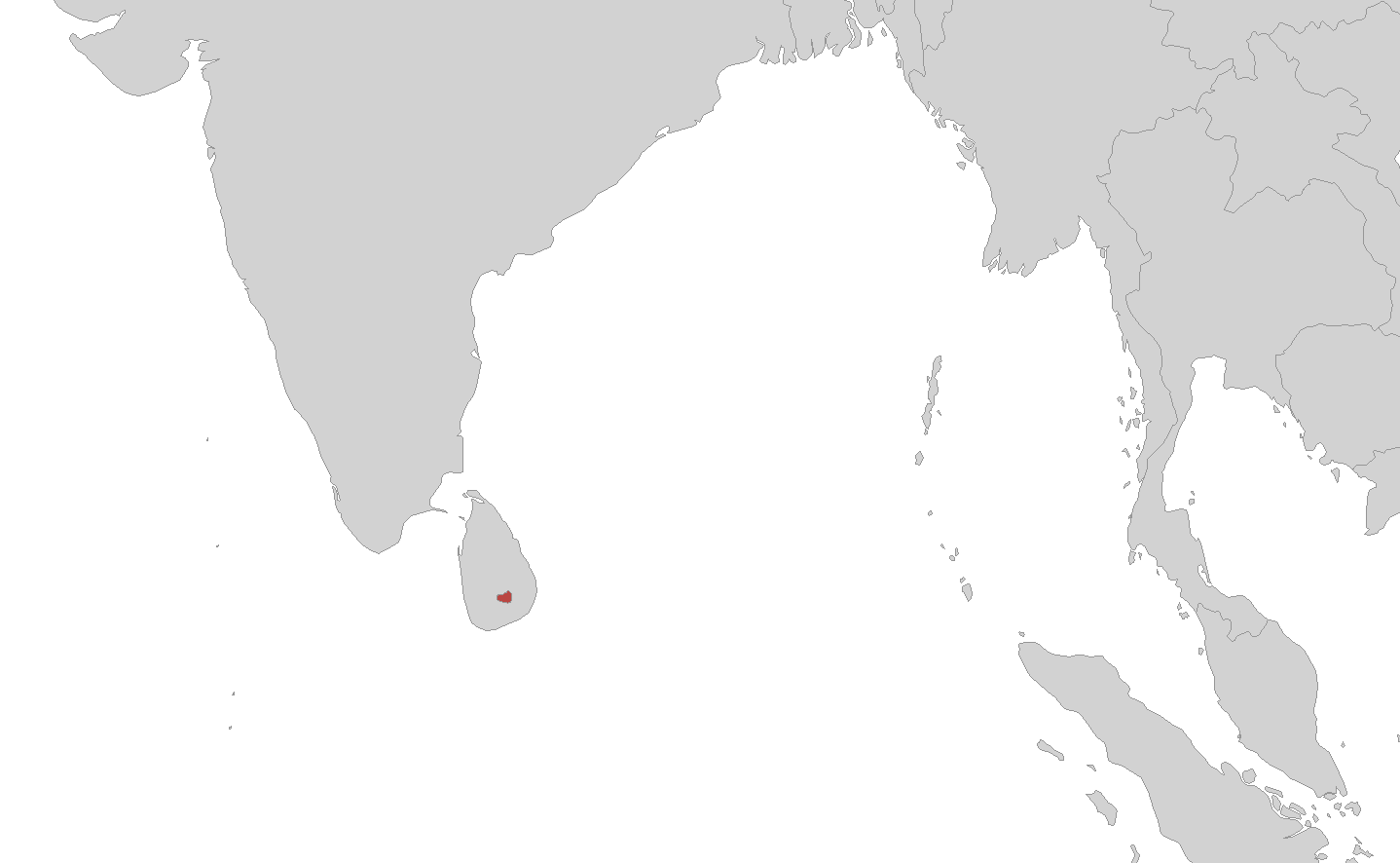
- Pattipola caecilian range

Synonyms
- Ichthyophis taprobanicensis Taylor, 1969

Species of amphibian

Ichthyophis orthoplicatus, also known as the Pattipola caecilian or brown caecilian, is a species of caecilian endemic to Sri Lanka. It is found in a range of natural and man-made habitats including evergreen forests, rubber and tea plantations, paddy fields, rural gardens and farms, wetlands (boggy areas), and cattle pastureland.

The holotype was estimated to have measured about 235 mm (9.3 in) in total length.
