= Ichthyophis weberi =

Conservation status
- Endangered (IUCN 3.1)

Scientific classification
- Kingdom: Animalia
- Phylum: Chordata
- Class: Amphibia
- Order: Gymnophiona
- Clade: Apoda
- Family: Ichthyophiidae
- Genus: Ichthyophis
- Species: I. weberi

Binomial name
- Ichthyophis weberi Taylor, 1920

Synonyms
- Caudacaecilia weberi (Taylor, 1920)

Species of amphibian

Ichthyophis weberi, the Malatgan River caecilian, is a species of amphibian in the family Ichthyophiidae endemic to the Philippines. Its natural habitats are subtropical or tropical moist lowland forests, subtropical or tropical moist montane forests, rivers, intermittent rivers, plantations, rural gardens, heavily degraded former forests, irrigated land, and seasonally flooded agricultural land.

In 2011, the species was found in Cleopatra's Needle, a diverse landscape of ancient rainforest in Palawan, after 50 years of disappearance.
