= Ichthyophis sendenyu =

Conservation status
- Data Deficient (IUCN 3.1)

Scientific classification
- Kingdom: Animalia
- Phylum: Chordata
- Class: Amphibia
- Order: Gymnophiona
- Clade: Apoda
- Family: Ichthyophiidae
- Genus: Ichthyophis
- Species: I. sendenyu

Binomial name
- Ichthyophis sendenyu Kamei et al., 2007

Species of amphibian

Ichthyophis sendenyu, the Sendenyu striped ichthyophis, is a species of caecilian found in India. This species of Ichthyophis possesses broad and solid lateral yellow stripes from about the level of the posterior of its disc to its eye level on the upper jaw, while arched yellow stripes extend to its nares. Its length does not exceed 350 millimetres (14 in). Its head is U-shaped and short. Scales are present in anteriormost grooves, with five to eight rows placed posteriorly on its dorsum. It is named after Sendenyu village, Nagaland, where the species was first found.

== Description ==
This species counts with 112 vertebrae. The head, nuchal region and trunk are dorsoventrally compressed, with its body's maximal girth being near the midbody. Its tail is upturned towards the tip. The animal's head is short, with a length of about 23.9 millimetres (0.94 in). Its eyes are closer to the top of its head than to its lip, and are surrounded by an asymmetric whitish ring; its eye diameter approximates 0.8mm (its lens being larger than its naris). Its nares are slightly posterior to level of the anterior margin of its mouth. Its teeth are very slender and recurved, while its tongue is strongly plicate posteriorly. Its choanae are wide, the distance between them being about three times their greatest width.

It possesses seventeen denticulations around its vent. While in preservation, the animal is a dark brown colour, its venter being a paler tinge of grey. Bright yellow lateral stripes (with a varying width of between 3.1 to 5.1 millimetres (0.12 to 0.20 in)) extend from about the fourth last annulus to about the eye level on the lower jaw. It presents a wide gap at the mandible's tip, giving a darker area between its throat's stripes a "mushroom" shape. In life, its dorsum is uniformly bright orange/brown, with a venter that is a pale lilac-grey, while its lateral stripe is bright yellow.

== Distribution ==
This species has only been observed in its type locality, in Nagaland, India.
