= Ichthyophis elongatus =

Conservation status
- Data Deficient (IUCN 3.1)

Scientific classification
- Kingdom: Animalia
- Phylum: Chordata
- Class: Amphibia
- Order: Gymnophiona
- Clade: Apoda
- Family: Ichthyophiidae
- Genus: Ichthyophis
- Species: I. elongatus

Binomial name
- Ichthyophis elongatus Taylor, 1965
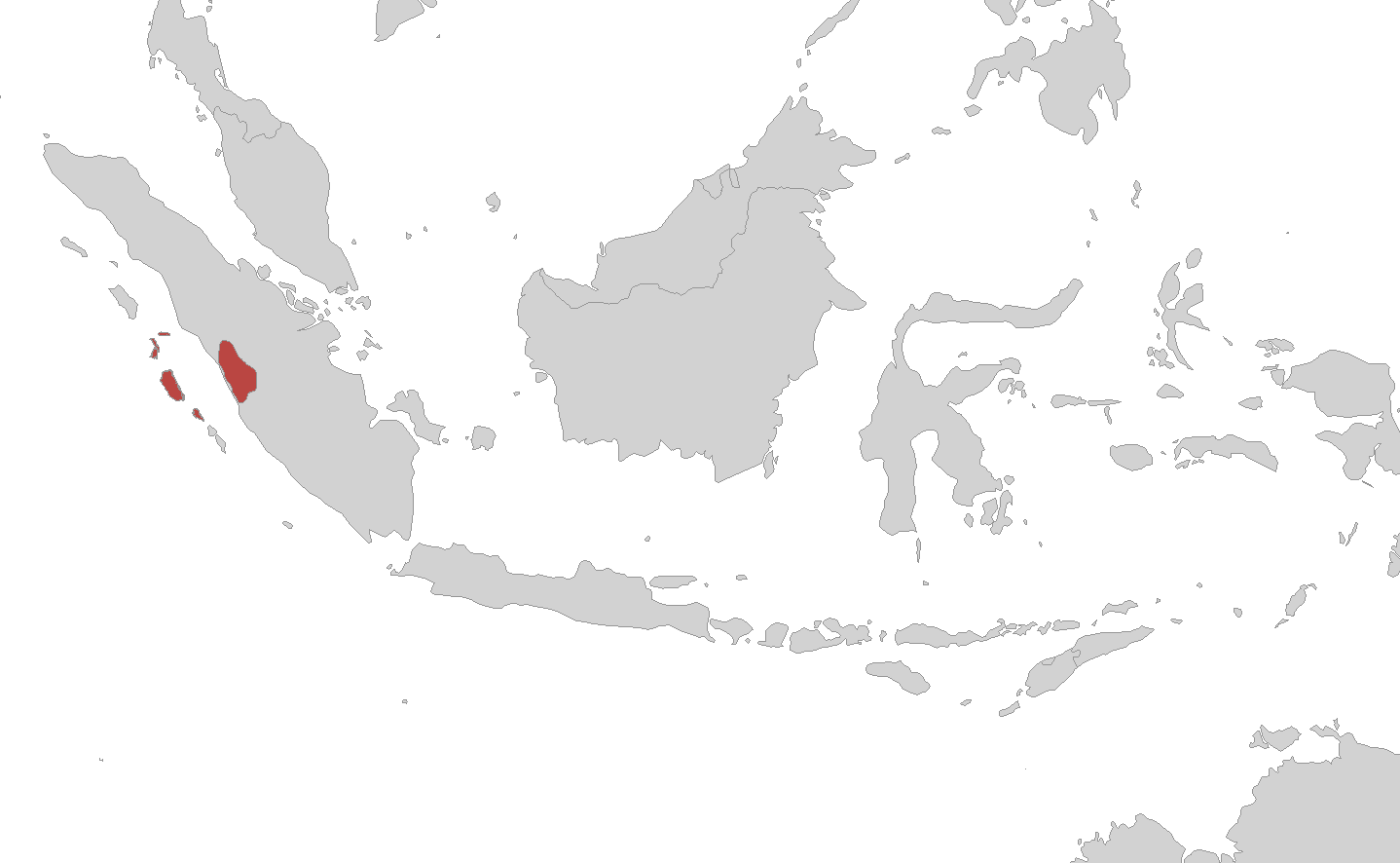
- Elongated caecilian range

Species of amphibian

Ichthyophis elongatus, the elongated caecilian, is a species of amphibians in the family Ichthyophiidae endemic to Sumatra, including some nearby islands; however, whether these belong to this species is uncertain.

Specimens allocated to this species with certainty have been collected from lowland forest and from a ravine near degraded forest.

The type series varies 280–300 mm (11–12 in) in total length. It is relatively slim, with body width of 7.8–8 mm (0.31–0.31 in).
