= Ichthyophis dulitensis =

Conservation status
- Data Deficient (IUCN 3.1)

Scientific classification
- Kingdom: Animalia
- Phylum: Chordata
- Class: Amphibia
- Order: Gymnophiona
- Clade: Apoda
- Family: Ichthyophiidae
- Genus: Ichthyophis
- Species: I. dulitensis

Binomial name
- Ichthyophis dulitensis Taylor, 1960
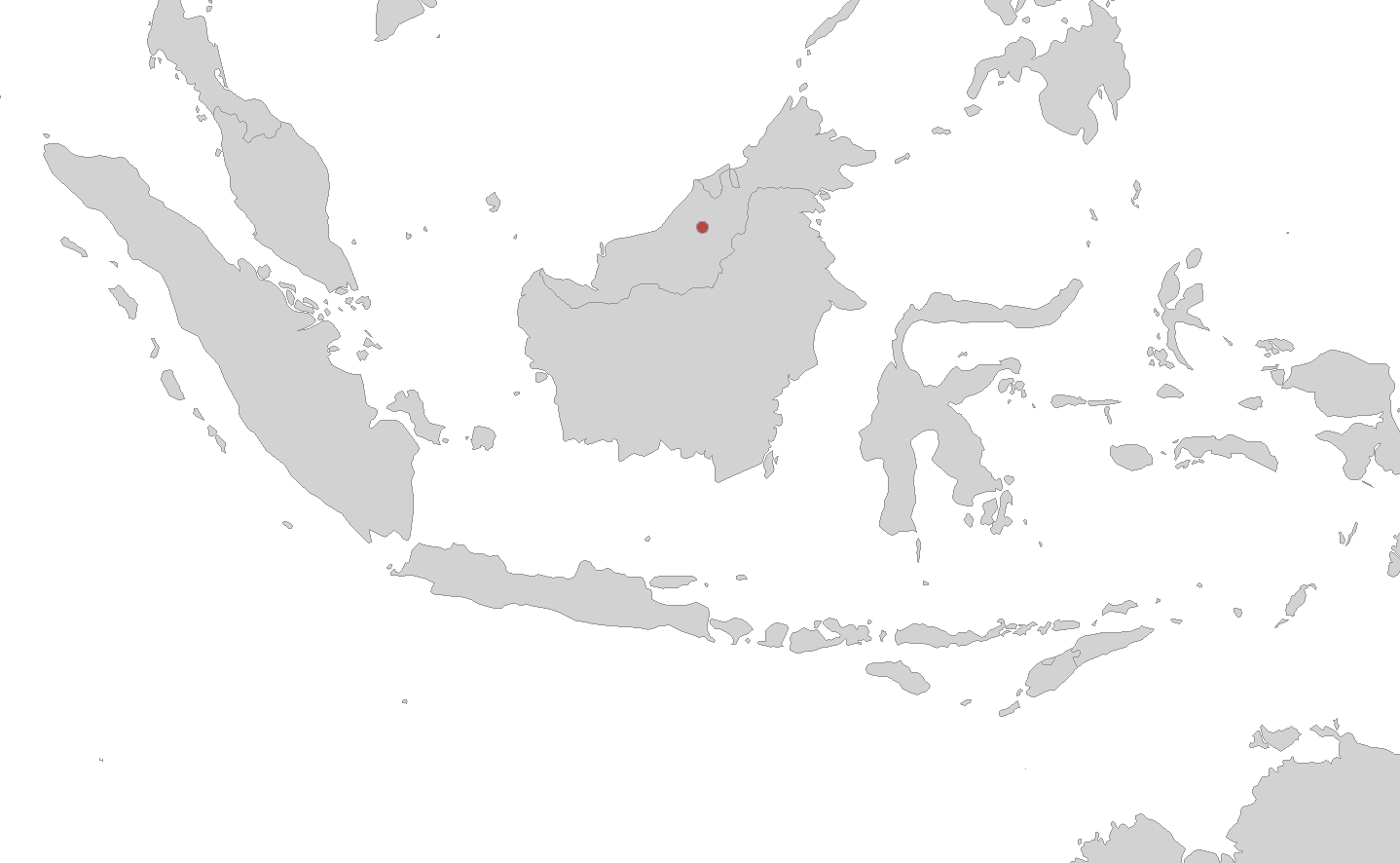
- Mount Dulit caecilian range

Species of amphibian

Ichthyophis dulitensis is a species of caecilian in the family Ichthyophiidae. It is endemic to Borneo and only known from near its type locality, Mount Dulit in northern Sarawak, Malaysia, after which it is named. Described by Edward Harrison Taylor in 1960, the holotype was collected by Charles Hose already in 1891. It is a poorly known species with uncertain taxonomic status. Common name Mount Dulit caecilian has been coined for it.

== Description ==
Ichthyophis dulitensis is a moderately slender caecilian. The holotype measures 235 mm (9.3 in) in snout–vent length and about 8 mm (0.31 in) in average body width. The head is 11 mm (0.43 in) long. The eyes are small with white pupils and black iris. Tail is short, 5.6 mm (0.22 in). The skin has about 313 ring-shaped folds (annuli). The throat has a creamy spot.

== Habitat and conservation ==
The holotype was collected from Mount Dulit at 610 m (2,000 ft) above sea level. It presumably inhabits tropical moist forest. Adults are likely subterranean. The threats to this species are unknown.
