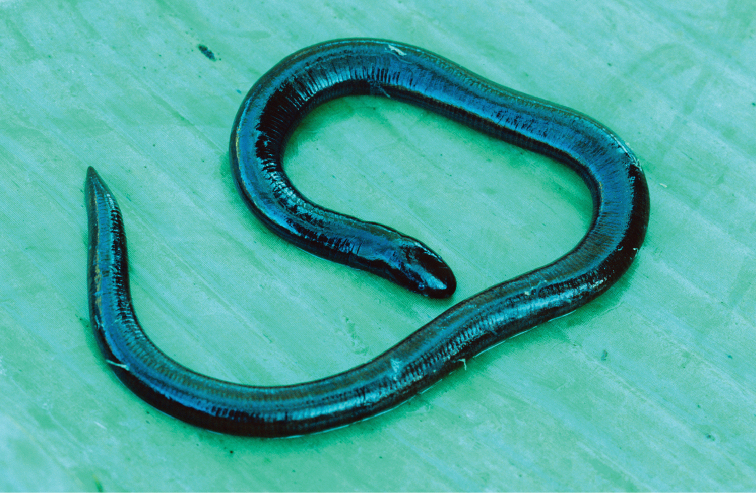

Conservation status
- Least Concern (IUCN 3.1)

Scientific classification
- Kingdom: Animalia
- Phylum: Chordata
- Class: Amphibia
- Order: Gymnophiona
- Clade: Apoda
- Family: Ichthyophiidae
- Genus: Ichthyophis
- Species: I. mindanaoensis

Binomial name
- Ichthyophis mindanaoensis Taylor, 1960

= Ichthyophis mindanaoensis =

Species of amphibian

Ichthyophis mindanaoensis, also known as Todaya caecilian or Mindanao Island caecilian, is a species of caecilian in the family Ichthyophiidae. It is endemic to the island of Mindanao, the Philippines.

== Description ==
Ichthyophis mindanaoensis was described based on two unsexed specimens, both measuring about 28 cm (11.0 in) in total length. The tail is short, about 6 mm (0.2 in). The body width is 10 mm (0.4 in). There are 308–317 transverse folds. The head is rounded and oval. The eyes are visible, covered by skin and slightly raised.

A collection of larvae likely belonging to this species measure 7–23 cm (2.8–9.1 in) in total length, suggesting a relatively large size at metamorphosis. All but the largest larvae retain the lateral line system.

== Habitat and conservation ==
Ichthyophis mindanaoensis occurs in lowland and submontane primary and secondary rainforests at elevations of 100–1,000 m (330–3,280 ft) above sea level, and probably higher. It has also been recorded in agricultural land adjacent to remnant natural forest patches. Adults are subterranean and have usually been observed under rocks, decaying logs and debris, and in shallow pools of mountain streams, but also in soil beside irrigation ditches. The larvae occur in unpolluted streams, rivers, and quiet pools near streams.

This species has a very localized and patchy distribution, but it can be relatively abundant where it occurs. It is threatened by habitat loss and conversion, although it seems to be fairly adaptable, and might thereby not be significantly threatened, except locally. Furthermore, caecilians often killed because they are mistaken for snakes. Ichthyophis mindanaoensis is known from Mount Kitanglad Natural Park, Malagos Watershed Area, and Mount Apo Natural Park, all relatively well protected and enforced areas.
