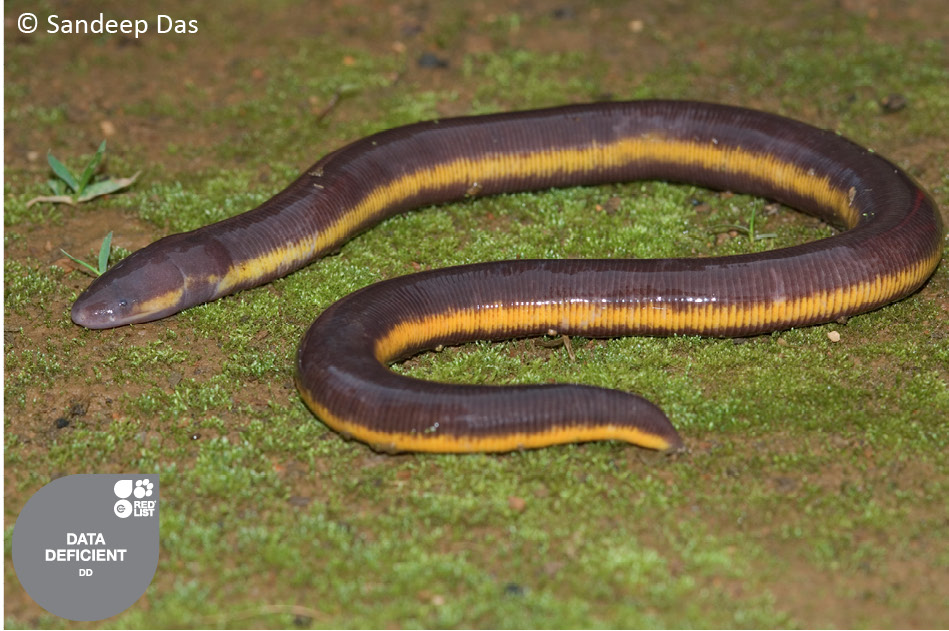

Conservation status
- Data Deficient (IUCN 3.1)

Scientific classification
- Domain: Eukaryota
- Kingdom: Animalia
- Phylum: Chordata
- Class: Amphibia
- Order: Gymnophiona
- Clade: Apoda
- Family: Ichthyophiidae
- Genus: Ichthyophis
- Species: I. longicephalus

Binomial name
- Ichthyophis longicephalus Pillai, 1986

= Ichthyophis longicephalus =

Species of amphibian

Ichthyophis longicephalus, the long-headed caecilian, is a species of caecilian in the family Ichthyophiidae. The body is dark violet-brown, and lighter ventrally. A yellow lateral stripe starts at the neck and reaches the tip of the tail. Small, yellow patches are also found on the sides of the neck. A midventral line formed by the breaking of annuli ventrally extends from the neck to the vent. The long head has distinct eyes, and the tentacles are close to the lip and eye. The nostrils are at the tip of the snout and visible from above. The upper jaw overhangs the lower jaw. The species is found in Kerala (known from Silent Valley National Park).
