= Ichthyophis larutensis =

Conservation status
- Data Deficient (IUCN 3.1)

Scientific classification
- Kingdom: Animalia
- Phylum: Chordata
- Class: Amphibia
- Order: Gymnophiona
- Clade: Apoda
- Family: Ichthyophiidae
- Genus: Ichthyophis
- Species: I. larutensis

Binomial name
- Ichthyophis larutensis Taylor, 1960
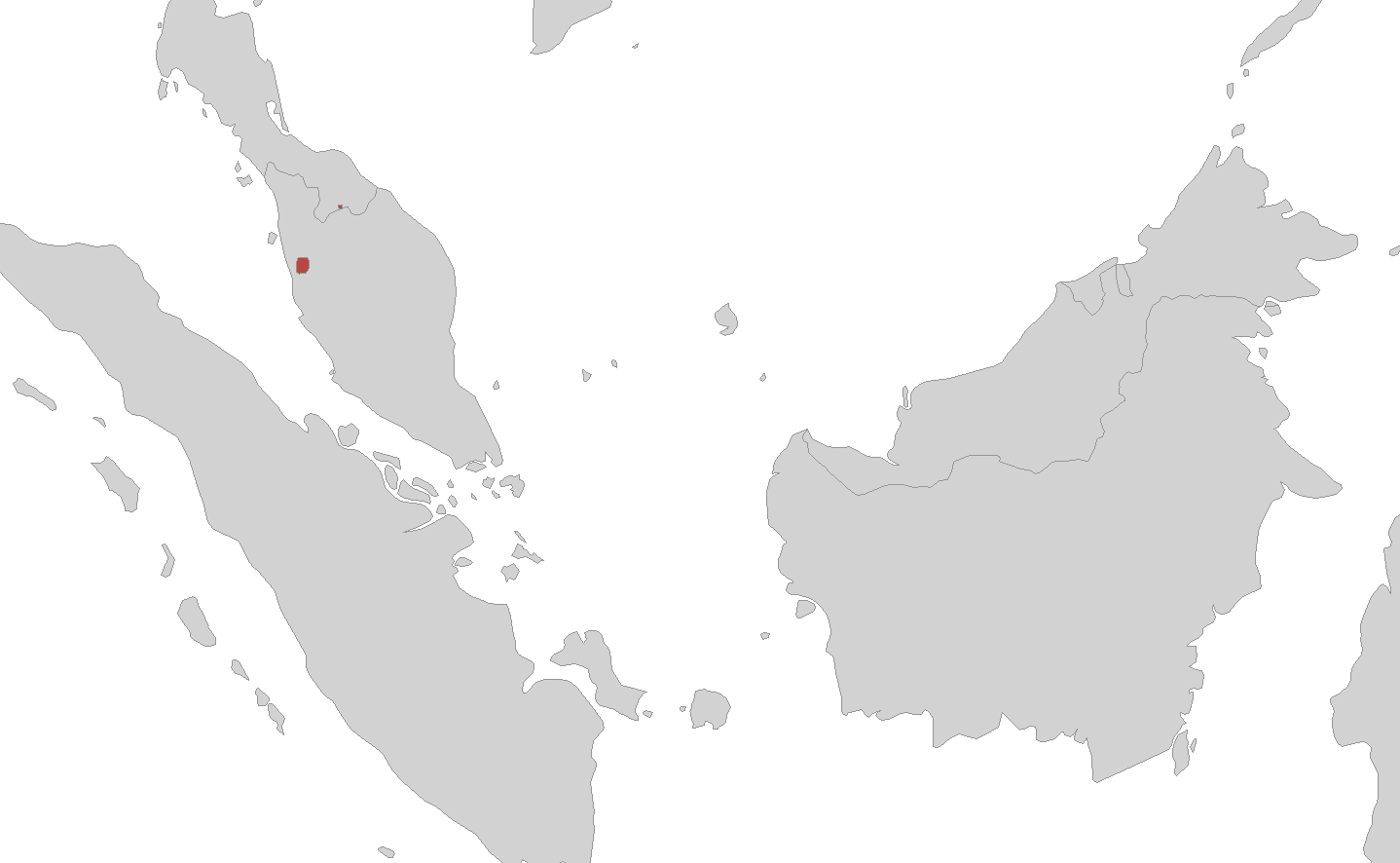
- Ichthyophis larutensis range

Synonyms
- Caudacaecilia larutensis (Taylor, 1960)

Species of amphibian

Ichthyophis larutensis, the Larut Hills caecilian, is a species of amphibian in the family Ichthyophiidae found in Malaysia and Thailand. Its natural habitats are subtropical or tropical moist lowland forests, subtropical or tropical moist montane forests, rivers, intermittent rivers, plantations, rural gardens, heavily degraded former forest, irrigated land, and seasonally flooded agricultural land.
