= Ichthyophis nigroflavus =

Conservation status
- Data Deficient (IUCN 3.1)

Scientific classification
- Kingdom: Animalia
- Phylum: Chordata
- Class: Amphibia
- Order: Gymnophiona
- Clade: Apoda
- Family: Ichthyophiidae
- Genus: Ichthyophis
- Species: I. nigroflavus

Binomial name
- Ichthyophis nigroflavus Taylor, 1960

Synonyms
- Caudacaecilia nigroflava (Taylor, 1960)

Species of amphibian

Ichthyophis nigroflavus, the Kuala Lumpur caecilian, is a species of amphibian in the family Ichthyophiidae endemic to Malaysia. Its natural habitats are subtropical or tropical moist lowland forests, rivers, intermittent rivers, plantations, rural gardens, heavily degraded former forest, irrigated land, and seasonally flooded agricultural land.
