= Ichthyophis paucisulcus =

Conservation status
- Least Concern (IUCN 3.1)

Scientific classification
- Kingdom: Animalia
- Phylum: Chordata
- Class: Amphibia
- Order: Gymnophiona
- Clade: Apoda
- Family: Ichthyophiidae
- Genus: Ichthyophis
- Species: I. paucisulcus

Binomial name
- Ichthyophis paucisulcus Taylor, 1960
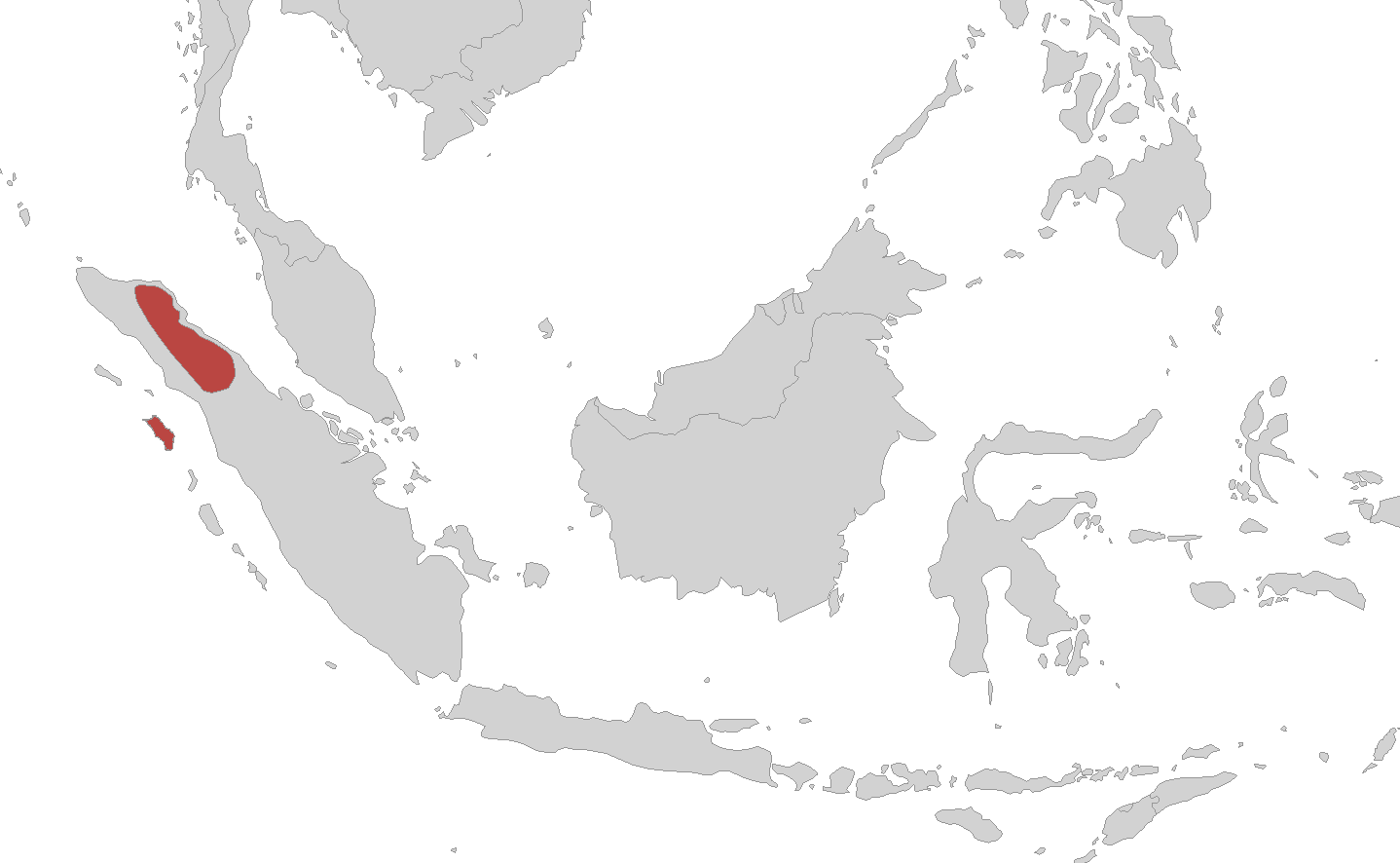
- Siantar caecilian range

Species of amphibian

Ichthyophis paucisulcus, the Siantar caecilian, is a species of amphibian in the family Ichthyophiidae found in Indonesia and Singapore. Its natural habitats are subtropical or tropical moist lowland forests, subtropical or tropical swamps, rivers, intermittent rivers, plantations, rural gardens, heavily degraded former forests, seasonally flooded agricultural land, and canals and ditches.
