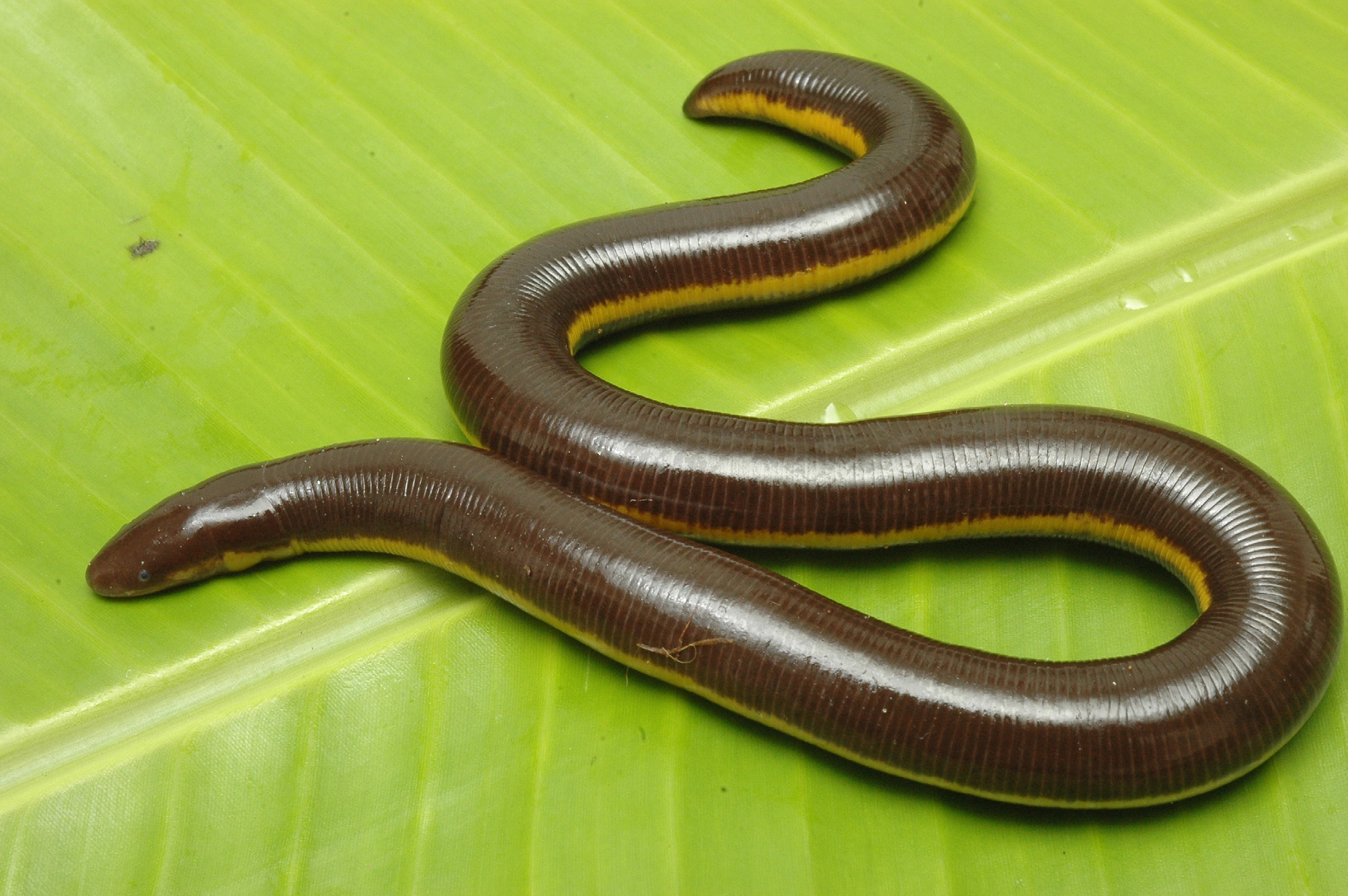
- Specimen from Basarekattae, Chickmagalur district

Conservation status
- Data Deficient (IUCN 3.1)

Scientific classification
- Kingdom: Animalia
- Phylum: Chordata
- Class: Amphibia
- Order: Gymnophiona
- Clade: Apoda
- Family: Ichthyophiidae
- Genus: Ichthyophis
- Species: I. kodaguensis

Binomial name
- Ichthyophis kodaguensis Wilkinson, Gower, Govindappa, and Venkatachalaiah, 2007

= Ichthyophis kodaguensis =

Species of amphibian

Ichthyophis kodaguensis, also known as the Kodagu striped Ichthyophis, is a species of caecilian in the family Ichthyophiidae. It is endemic to the southern Western Ghats, India. All confirmed records are from southern Karnataka state, although it is also reported from adjacent Kerala.

== Distribution ==
In addition to its type locality, Venkidds Valley Estate south of Madikeri in the eponymous Kodagu district, Ichthyophis kodaguensis is known from another locality in the Kodagu district north of Madikeri, and from the Chickmagalur district; all these records are from southern Karnataka state. It has been implied to occur in adjacent Kerala.

== Description ==
The type series consists of seven females that measure 158 to 272 mm (6.2 to 10.7 in) in total length. Width at the midbody is 8 to 12 mm (0.3 to 0.5 in). There are 276 to 306 ventral annuli. A later discovered, unsexed specimen measured 31 cm (12.2 in) in total length and had 343 ventral annuli. The body is subcylindrical and slightly dorso-ventrally compressed. The head is slightly wider than the body. The eyes are surrounded by narrow whitish ring and are visible through unpigmented skin as small, dark circles with lighter grey central lens; they are slightly elevated above adjacent skin. Living individuals have long and thin tentacles. The body is dorsally uniform dark chestnut brown, with a slightly lighter snout. A bright, cream-yellow lateral stripe runs all along the length of the body; it has irregular margins and is interrupted at the first collar. The ventrum, paler than the dorsum, is lilac-grey-brown, slightly darker posteriorly and immediately adjacent to the lateral stripe.

== Habitat and conservation ==
The type series was collected from a mixed coffee and areca nut plantation at 1,143 m (3,750 ft) above sea level. The holotype was collected by digging in soil by a small stream. Another specimen was found at night on a dry pathway on a hill slope, just outside a wet evergreen forest fragment and some 50 m away from the closest water body, a rivulet. Two specimens have been found on a coffee plantation at an altitude similar to the type locality.

In 2008, before new distributional records were published, the International Union for Conservation of Nature (IUCN) has classified Ichthyophis kodaguensis as "data deficient". IUCN acknowledged the species as being able to live in agricultural habitat and thereby able to tolerate disturbed habitats, but considered available information too scarce to assess its conservation status.
