= Ichthyophis multicolor =

Conservation status
- Data Deficient (IUCN 3.1)

Scientific classification
- Kingdom: Animalia
- Phylum: Chordata
- Class: Amphibia
- Order: Gymnophiona
- Clade: Apoda
- Family: Ichthyophiidae
- Genus: Ichthyophis
- Species: I. multicolor

Binomial name
- Ichthyophis multicolor Wilkinson et al., 2014

Species of amphibian

Ichthyophis multicolor is a species of caecilians endemic to Burma. It is only known from its type locality in the Ayeyarwady Region. A unique characteristic of this species is that it is the only Ichthyophis species besides I. tricolor that has a pale vent, as well as an adjacent darker stripe running lengthwise down the vent's sides.
