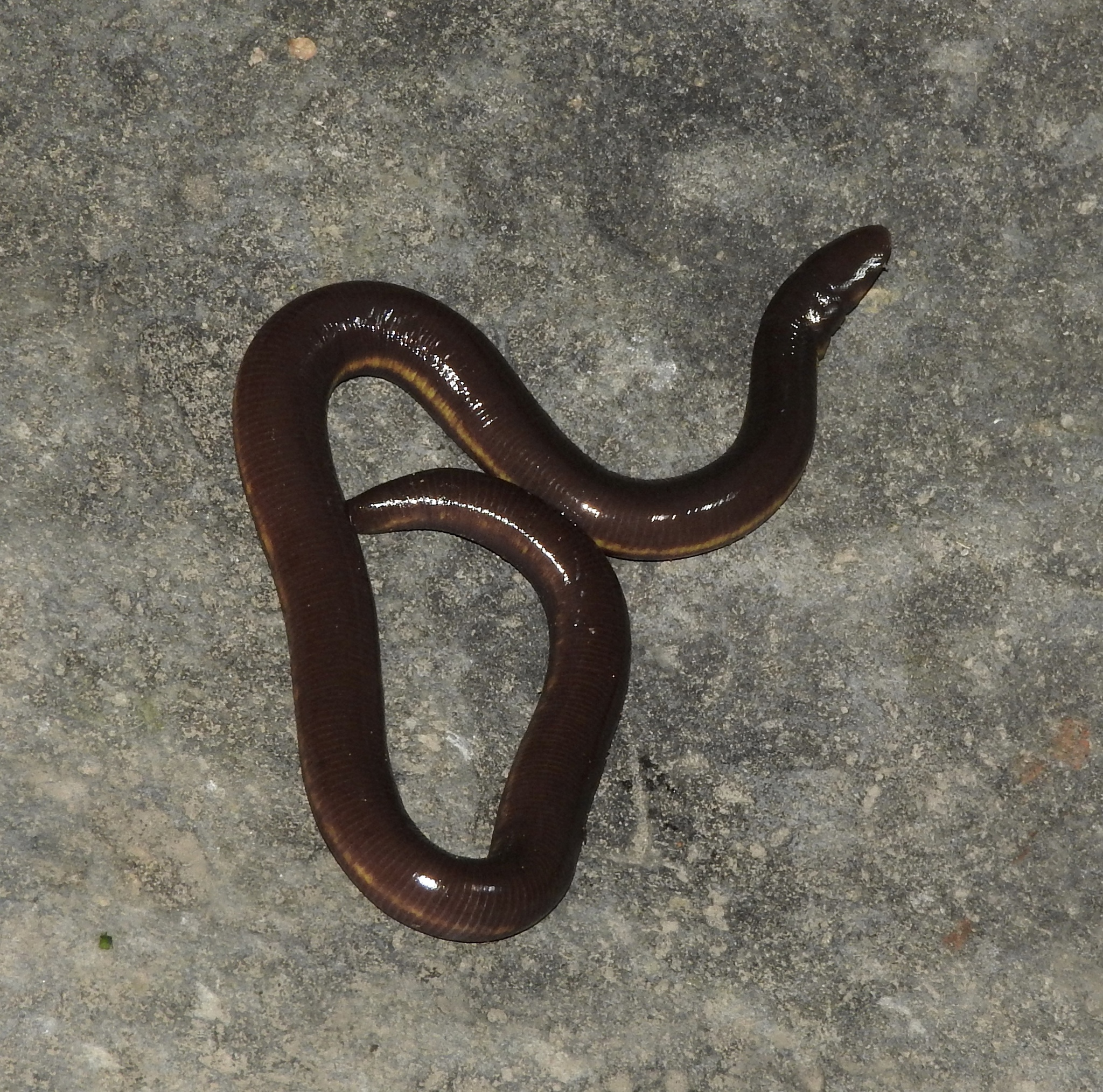

Conservation status
- Least Concern (IUCN 3.1)

Scientific classification
- Kingdom: Animalia
- Phylum: Chordata
- Class: Amphibia
- Order: Gymnophiona
- Clade: Apoda
- Family: Ichthyophiidae
- Genus: Ichthyophis
- Species: I. hypocyaneus

Binomial name
- Ichthyophis hypocyaneus (Van Hasselt in Boie, 1827)
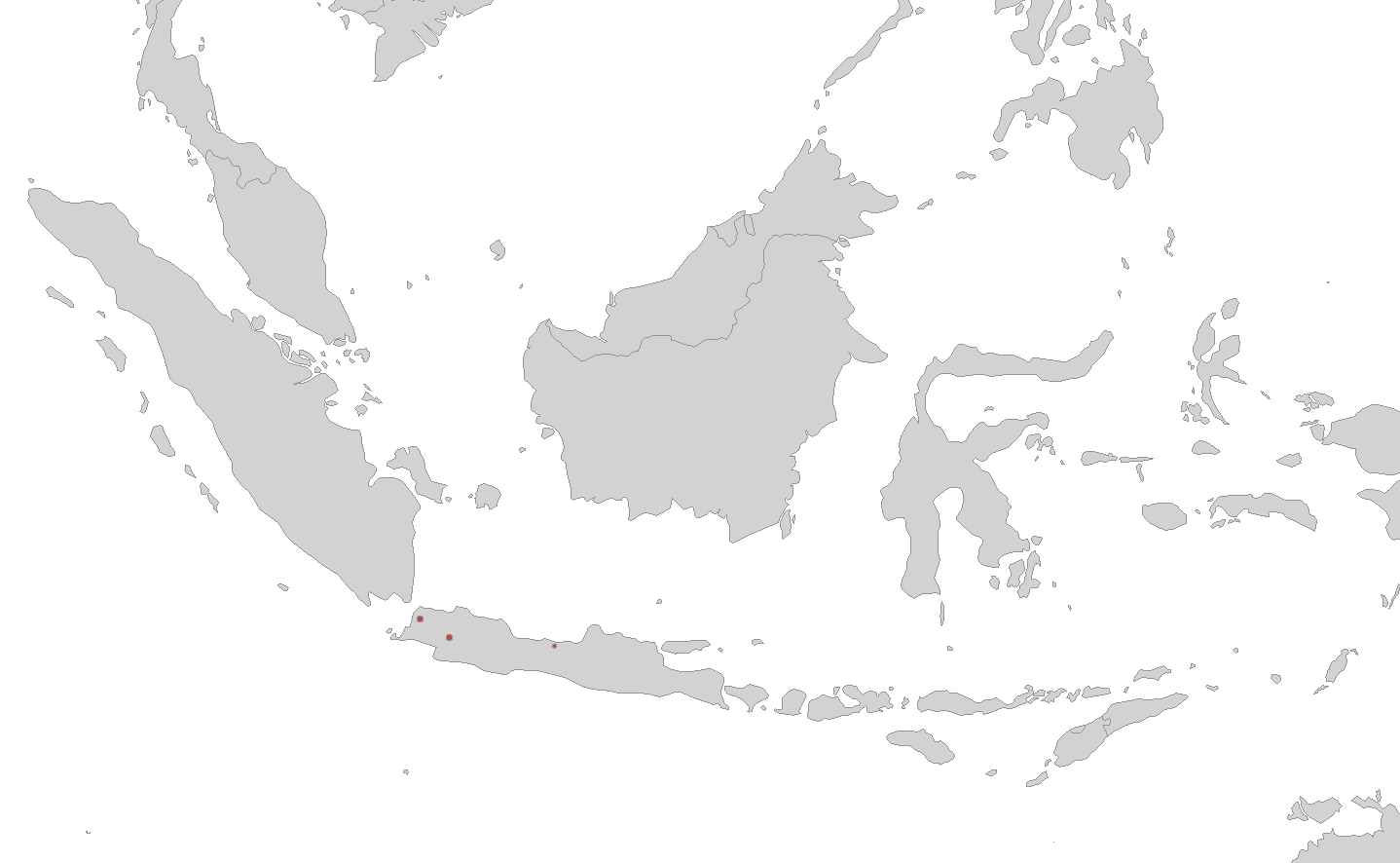
- Bantam caecilian range

Synonyms
- Coecilia hypocyanea J. C. Van Hasselt in Boie, 1827

= Ichthyophis hypocyaneus =

Species of amphibian

Ichthyophis hypocyaneus, the Javan caecilian or marsh caecilian, is a species of amphibian in the family Ichthyophiidae of caecilians, endemic to Java, Indonesia. Until its rediscovery in 2000, it was known only from the 1827 type specimen.

== Distribution and habitat ==
Ichthyophis hypocyaneus is so far known from four sites on Java Island, Indonesia, and was originally described in Banten in West Java. The species was thought to be extinct but rediscovered through a second observation in Pekalongan. The third sighting of the species was in Bodogol, at the edge of Gunung Gede Pangrango National Park (Kusrini 2007), and the fourth sighting in Gunung Halimun-Salak National Park.

== Ecology ==
Ichthyophis caecilians are oviparous and present in a broad range of terrestrial microhabitats, ranging from primary forests to plantations. The breeding season overlaps with the rainy season, when Ichthyophis caecilians are usually found in epigeic microhabitats. Egg deposition starts at the onset of the monsoon with metamorphosis taking place before the end of the dry season.
