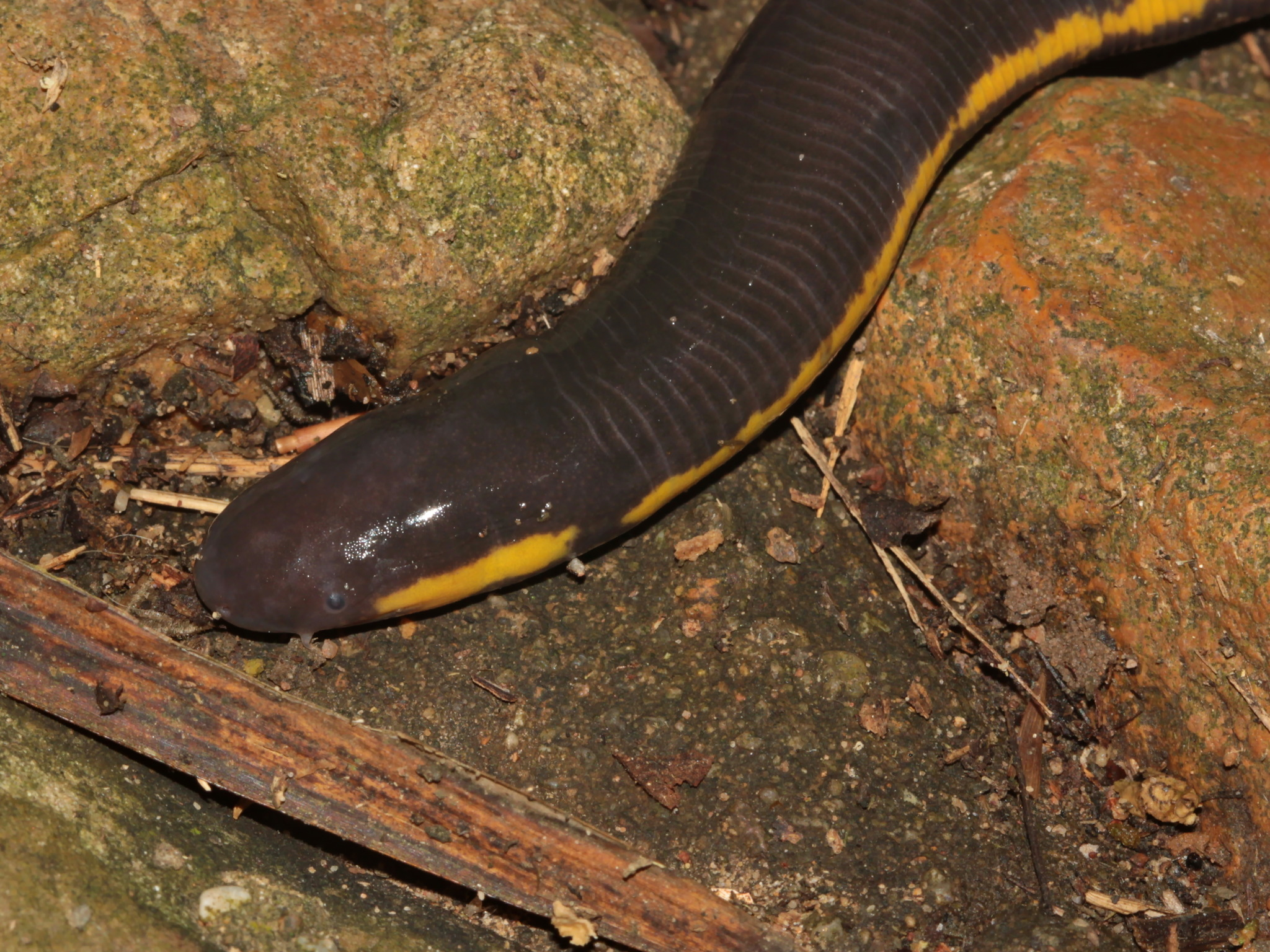

Conservation status
- Data Deficient (IUCN 3.1)

Scientific classification
- Kingdom: Animalia
- Phylum: Chordata
- Class: Amphibia
- Order: Gymnophiona
- Clade: Apoda
- Family: Ichthyophiidae
- Genus: Ichthyophis
- Species: I. kohtaoensis

Binomial name
- Ichthyophis kohtaoensis Taylor, 1960
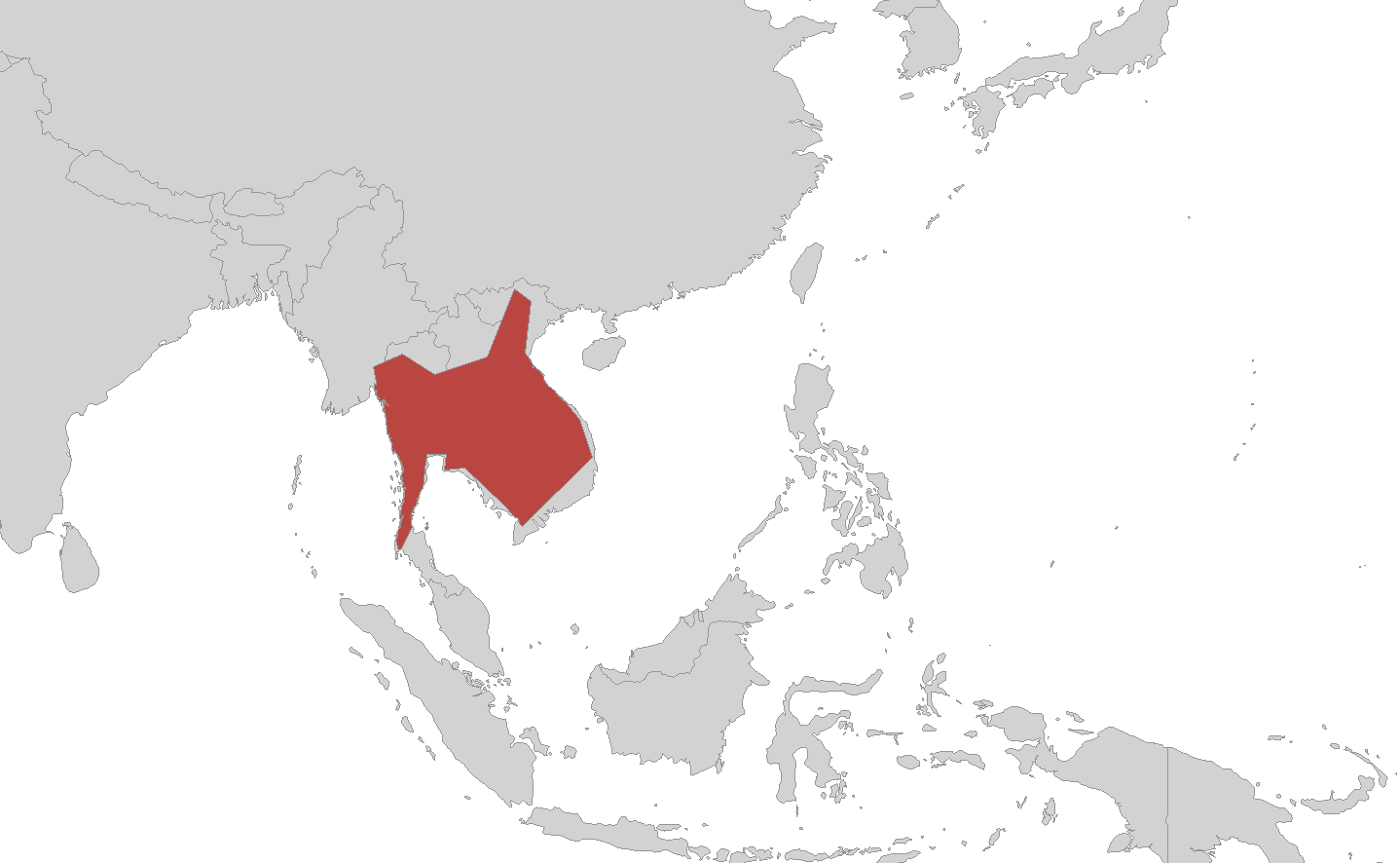
- Koh Tao Island caecilian range

Synonyms
- Ichthyophis bannanicus Yang, 1984

= Koh Tao Island caecilian =

Species of amphibian

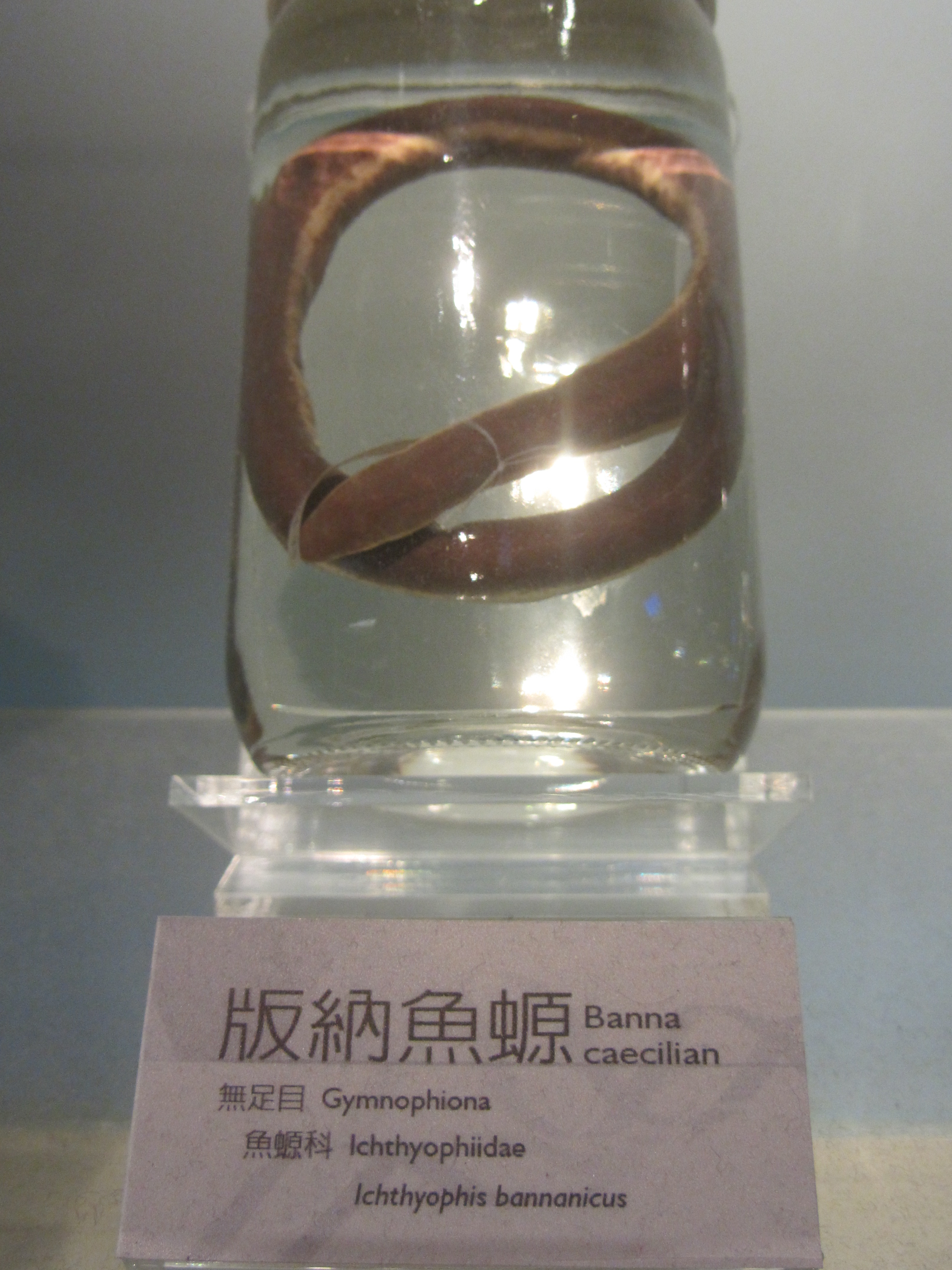
Specimen of Ichthyophis bannanicus in National Museum of Natural Science in Taiwan

The Koh Tao Island caecilian (Ichthyophis kohtaoensis) is a species of amphibian in the family Ichthyophiidae found in Cambodia, Laos, Myanmar, Thailand, and Vietnam. Also known as the Ichthyophis bannanicus, the Banna caecilian, it is also found in southern China.

Its natural habitats are subtropical or tropical moist lowland forests, subtropical or tropical moist montane forests, rivers, intermittent rivers, swamps, freshwater marshes, intermittent freshwater marshes, plantations, rural gardens, urban areas, heavily degraded former forests, irrigated land, and seasonally flooded agricultural land. It is threatened by habitat loss.

The scientific name refers to Ko Tao Island in the Gulf of Siam, where the type specimen was collected.

== Genetics ==
The mitotic karyotypes of both the female and male Koh Tao caecilians have 21 pairs of chromosomes, although in a study performed by Nussbaum and Treisman, it was found that there was an inconsistent report of chromosomes. While they all may have the 21 chromosome pairs, there was a study that found they have 18 metacentric, 4 submetacentric, and 20 telocentric chromosomes while another study had found 16 metacentric, 6 submetacentric, and 20 telocentric chromosomes in the caecilians. The conclusion that Ichthyophis genus is a karyologically conserved taxa when it comes to looking at the chromosome numbers.
