= Javan caecilian =

Conservation status
- Data Deficient (IUCN 3.1)

Scientific classification
- Kingdom: Animalia
- Phylum: Chordata
- Class: Amphibia
- Order: Gymnophiona
- Clade: Apoda
- Family: Ichthyophiidae
- Genus: Ichthyophis
- Species: I. javanicus

Binomial name
- Ichthyophis javanicus Taylor, 1960

Species of amphibian

The Javan caecilian (Ichthyophis javanicus) is a species of amphibian in the family Ichthyophiidae endemic to Indonesia. Its natural habitats are subtropical or tropical moist lowland forests, subtropical or tropical moist montane forests, rivers, intermittent rivers, plantations, rural gardens, heavily degraded former forests, irrigated land, and seasonally flooded agricultural land.
