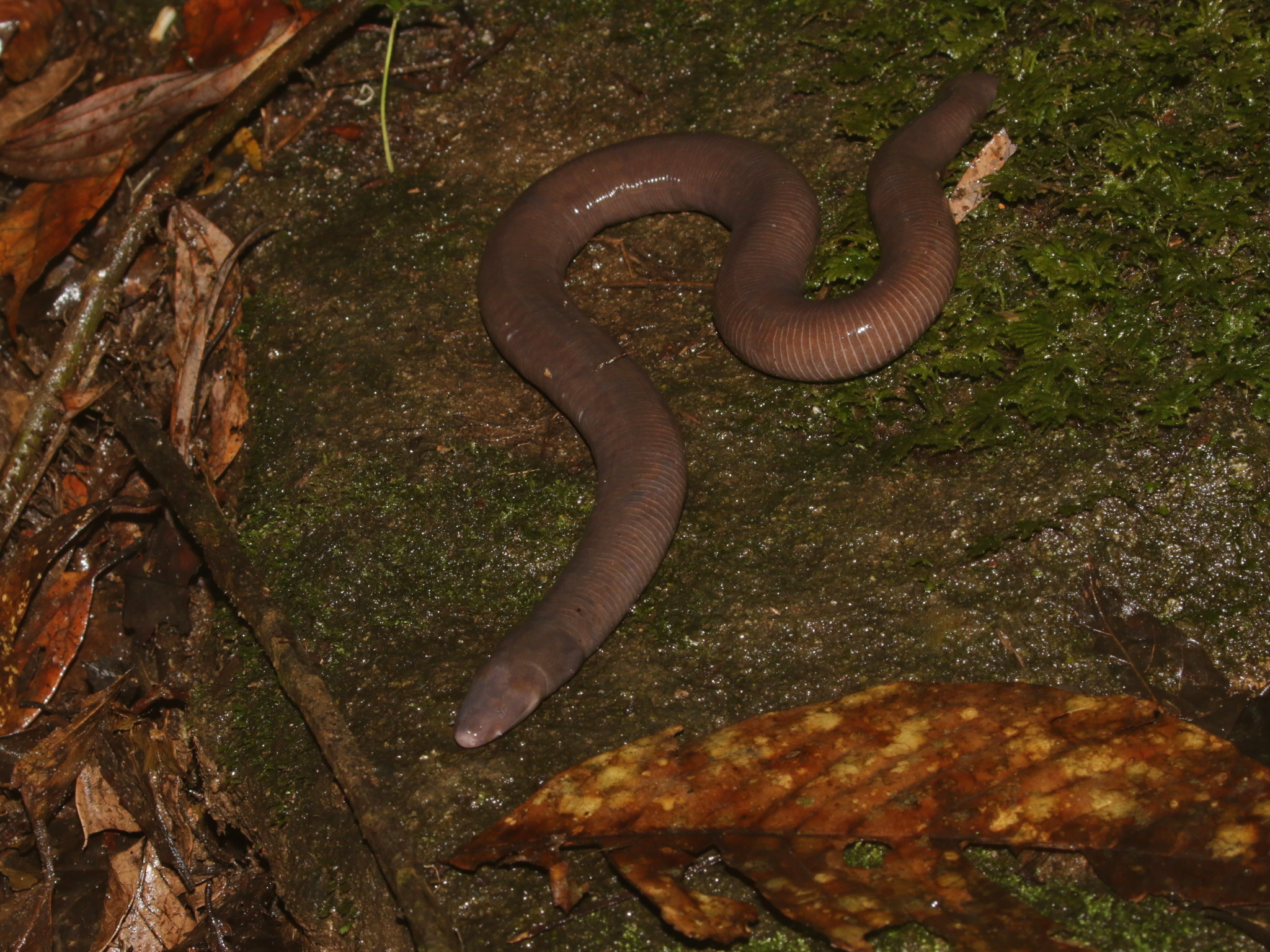

Conservation status
- Data Deficient (IUCN 3.1)

Scientific classification
- Kingdom: Animalia
- Phylum: Chordata
- Class: Amphibia
- Order: Gymnophiona
- Clade: Apoda
- Family: Ichthyophiidae
- Genus: Ichthyophis
- Species: I. cardamomensis

Binomial name
- Ichthyophis cardamomensis Geissler, Poyarkov, Grismer, Nguyen, An, Neang, Kupfer, Ziegler, Böhme & Müller, 2015

= Ichthyophis cardamomensis =

Species of amphibian

Ichthyophis cardamomensis, the Cardamom caecilian, is a species of caecilian within the family Ichthyophiidae.

== Description ==
Ichthyophis cardamomensis can grow to a length of 32.17 centimetres (12.67 in), with a pinkish hazelnut brown coloration that brightens on the sides and underbelly. The lips, nostrils, and tentacles are a whitish pink coloration. From a dorsal view the species has a flattened head that broadens slightly from the tentacles to the first collar. From a lateral view the head tapers slightly between the first collar and nares, before becoming a blunt snout at the end.

== Distribution and habitat ==
=== Distribution ===
Ichthyophis cardamomensis occurs in southwest Cambodia, in the Cardamom Mountains within the Pursat province, and in Preah Monivong National Park, within the Kamot Province at elevations of 293 to 968 metres (960 to 3,180 ft). This isn't thought to be the species full range however, as similar habitats and elevations occur nearby such as the Battambang, Koh Kong and Kampong Speu province.

=== Habitat ===
Ichthyophis cardamomensis is associated with hilly evergreen and semi-evergreen forests, often being found inside rotting logs and underneath soil during the day. The holotype of the species was found in a damp forest on a hillside at an elevation of 986 meters, and paratypes being found in a pitfall trap alongside a rotting log within a hilly forest at an elevation of 528 metres (1,730 ft). Based on where these specimens were found, it is thought that I. cardamomensis prefers high elevations around small bodies of water. Larvae of the species have been seen swimming in shallow, swift moving streams in September and October.

== Conservation ==
Ichthyophis cardamomensis has been classified as a 'Data deficient' species by the IUCN Red List as there is little information on the species population and current threats. The species range already overlaps with national parks, and likely overlaps with other protected areas such as the Central Cardamom Mountains National Park, Phnom Aural Wildlife Sanctuary, Southern Cardamom National Park, and Kirirom National Park.

=== Population ===
There is little information regarding the population of I. cardamomensis as it is only known from type-specimens, although other individuals have been observed in the Preah Monivong National Park. The species is rarely encountered during surveys, however this is thought to be because of its fossorial nature.

=== Threats ===
A high rate of deforestation is a significant threat to the biodiversity within Cambodia, as areas in the Pursat Province and Kampot Province are both being converted into agricultural land. Other parts of the species range also show signs of agriculture through the use of satellite imagery. This is likely to threat the lower elevations within the species range, however it is currently unknown how the loss of forests effects caecilian all together. Forests that have been turned into agricultural land are thought to not always detrimentally affect caecilian populations, specifically in cases where the crops grown provide shade and moisture.
