= Ichthyophis biangularis =

Conservation status
- Near Threatened (IUCN 3.1)

Scientific classification
- Kingdom: Animalia
- Phylum: Chordata
- Class: Amphibia
- Order: Gymnophiona
- Clade: Apoda
- Family: Ichthyophiidae
- Genus: Ichthyophis
- Species: I. biangularis

Binomial name
- Ichthyophis biangularis Taylor, 1965

Species of amphibian

Ichthyophis biangularis, the angular caecilian or Metang caecilian, is a species of amphibian in the family Ichthyophiidae endemic to Borneo (Malaysia): it is only known from its type locality, Mount Matang in Sarawak, where the holotype was collected in 1872 by Alfred Hart Everett. New specimens were collected from the type locality only in 2009. In addition, one larval sample was collected from the same region and identified as likely Ichthyophis biangularis using genetic methods.

== Description ==
The holotype of Ichthyophis biangularis measures 258 mm (10.2 in) in total length, including 5.8 mm (0.23 in) long tail. The body is 9.8 mm (0.39 in) wide and blackish slate above and below with a yellow lateral line. The eye is dimly distinct, with a slightly lighter ring about it.

== Habitat ==
This is a little known species. It is presumed to inhabit tropical moist forests.
