= Ichthyophis paucidentulus =

Conservation status
- Data Deficient (IUCN 3.1)

Scientific classification
- Kingdom: Animalia
- Phylum: Chordata
- Class: Amphibia
- Order: Gymnophiona
- Clade: Apoda
- Family: Ichthyophiidae
- Genus: Ichthyophis
- Species: I. paucidentulus

Binomial name
- Ichthyophis paucidentulus Taylor, 1965

Synonyms
- Caudacaecilia paucidentula {Taylor, 1965)

Species of amphibian

Ichthyophis paucidentulus, the Kapahiang caecilian, is a species of amphibian in the family Ichthyophiidae endemic to Indonesia. Its natural habitats are subtropical or tropical moist lowland forests, rivers, intermittent rivers, plantations, rural gardens, heavily degraded former forest, irrigated land, and seasonally flooded agricultural land.
