= Ichthyophis moustakius =

Conservation status
- Data Deficient (IUCN 3.1)

Scientific classification
- Kingdom: Animalia
- Phylum: Chordata
- Class: Amphibia
- Order: Gymnophiona
- Clade: Apoda
- Family: Ichthyophiidae
- Genus: Ichthyophis
- Species: I. moustakius

Binomial name
- Ichthyophis moustakius Kamei, Wilkinson, Gower, and Biju, 2009

Species of amphibian

Ichthyophis moustakius, the Manipur moustached caecilian, is a species of caecilian in the family Ichthyophiidae. It is endemic to Northeast India. This species exhibits broad lateral yellow stripes from the anterior part of its tail, along its mandibles, between its nares, as well as elsewhere. The animal can reach a length of 300 millimetres (12 in). Its head is somewhat U-shaped and fairly short; scales are absent on its collars. The species' name is derived from the Greek word moustakius, meaning "moustache", due to the yellow arched stripes it possesses.

== Description ==
This species counts with 105 vertebrae. The head, nuchal region and trunk are dorsoventrally compressed, with its body's maximal girth being near the midbody. Its tail is upturned towards the tip. The animal's head is short, with a length of about 21.7 millimetres (0.85 in). Its eyes are closer to the top of its head than to its lip, and are surrounded by a narrow whitish ring; its eye diameter approximates 0.6mm (its lens being no larger than its naris). Its nares are slightly posterior to level of the anterior margin of its mouth. Its teeth are slender and recurved, while its tongue is not strongly plicate. Its choanae are narrow, the distance between them being four or five times their greatest width.

It possesses fifteen denticulations around its vent. While in preservation, the animal is of a lilac-grey colour with a brownish tinge, being slightly paler ventrally. Lateral stripes extend from about the second or third posteriormost annulus to about the eye level on the upper jaw. Narrow and pale lines extend dorsally and are thickest near the nares. In life, its dorsum is a dark reddish grey, while the venter is pale reddish grey, and its narrow lateral stripes a bright yellow, its vent disc being mauvish.

== Distribution ==
This species has been observed in its type locality, in Tamenglong district, Manipur, India, at a height between 300 and 1,100 metres (980 and 3,610 ft) above sea level. It has also been recorded in Guwahati Metropolitan District (Manipur) and in Mizoram, northeastern India.
