= Ichthyophis singaporensis =

Conservation status
- Data Deficient (IUCN 3.1)

Scientific classification
- Kingdom: Animalia
- Phylum: Chordata
- Class: Amphibia
- Order: Gymnophiona
- Clade: Apoda
- Family: Ichthyophiidae
- Genus: Ichthyophis
- Species: I. singaporensis

Binomial name
- Ichthyophis singaporensis Taylor, 1960

Species of amphibian

Ichthyophis singaporensis, the Singapore caecilian, is a species of amphibian in the family Ichthyophiidae endemic to Singapore. Its natural habitats are subtropical or tropical moist lowland forests, rivers, intermittent rivers and former plantations. Currently, it is now restricted to the Central Catchment Nature Reserve. It has not been sighted for almost fifty years, and is possibly extinct. It might have existed in south Peninsular Malaysia in historic times. William Montgomerie was the island's first surgeon as well as Raffles's physician. The specimen was first identified as a species already known to science and sat amongst the unimaginable multitude of other specimens at what is today the Natural History Museum in London. Over a century after it was first collected, Edward Harrison Taylor studied this and other specimens of caecilians, which are legless amphibians that resemble snakes. Taylor concluded that this was a new species and named it Ichthyophis singaporensis from whence the specimen originated. It is commonly known as the Singapore caecilian. Remarkably, despite being Singapore's rarest amphibian, being known only from the type-specimen, I. singaporensis was also the first amphibian recorded from Singapore. Ichthyophis singaporensis was first described as ' I. glutinosus Var? ' by Cantor who received the specimen from Montgomerie in 1843 when it was dug up from his garden. Hanitsch incorrectly listed the collection date as 1863. Cantor found the specimen to differ from I. paucisulcus, but did not find conclusive data to designate it as a new species. Ichthyophis singaporensis was later described as a new species by Taylor. He included three specimens collected from Peninsular Malaysia as part of I. singaporensis. The specimens are from " Selangor ", Batu Gajah, and Kuala Kangsi. As of today, I. singaporensis is only known from these four specimens. No live photographs exist of I. singaporensis, but Taylor provides a radiographic image of the specimen. It is only known from a type-specimen predating 1847.
