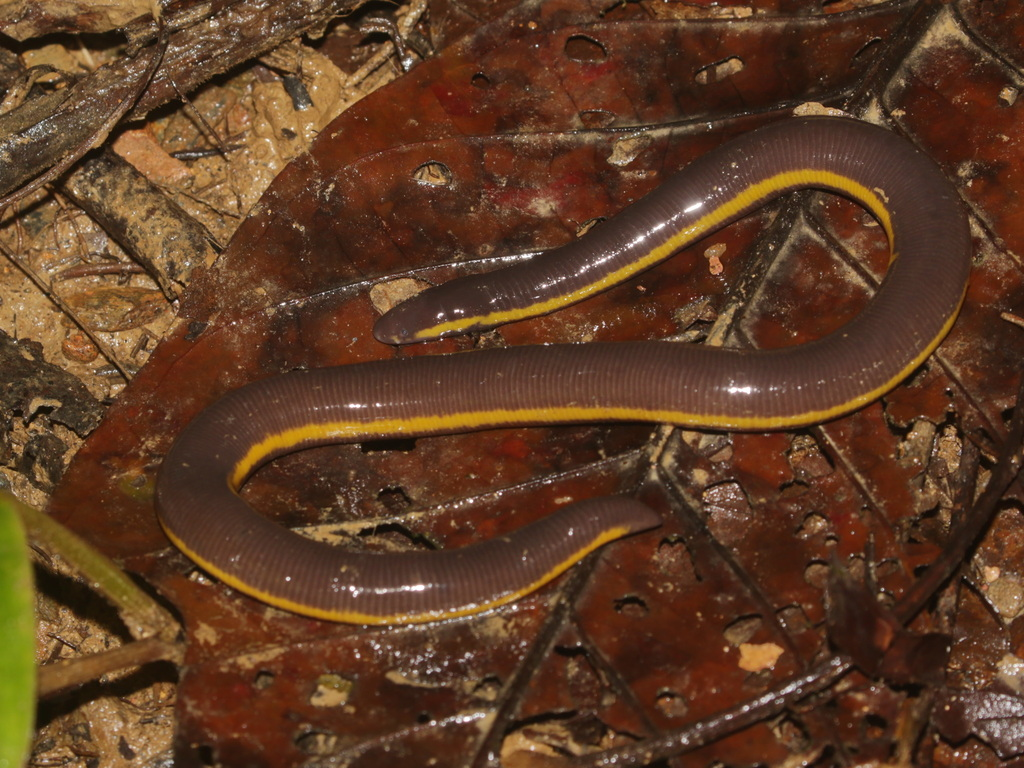

Conservation status
- Data Deficient (IUCN 3.1)

Scientific classification
- Kingdom: Animalia
- Phylum: Chordata
- Class: Amphibia
- Order: Gymnophiona
- Clade: Apoda
- Family: Ichthyophiidae
- Genus: Ichthyophis
- Species: I. supachaii

Binomial name
- Ichthyophis supachaii Taylor, 1960
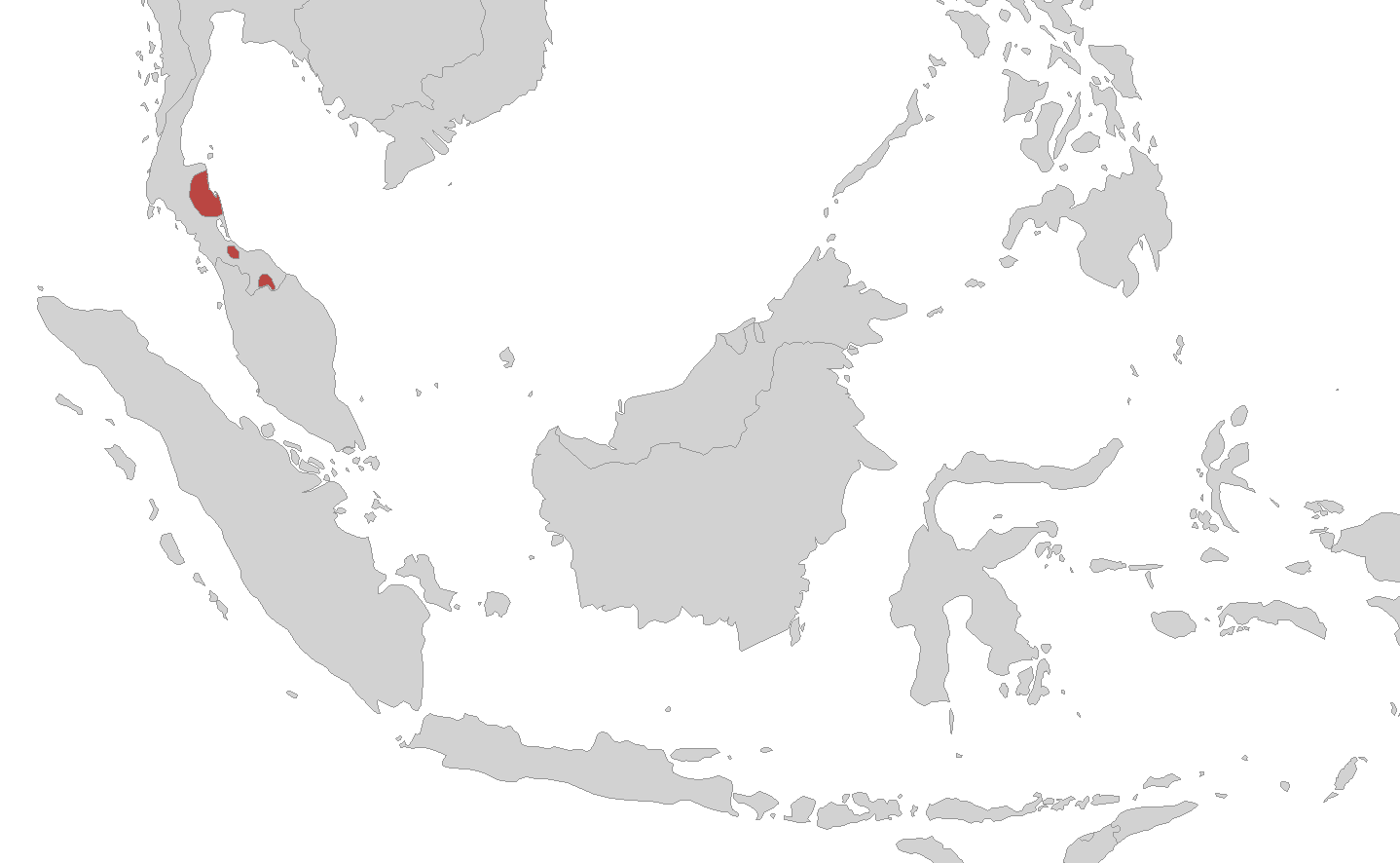
- Supachai's caecilian range

= Ichthyophis supachaii =

Species of amphibian

Ichthyophis supachaii, or Supachai's caecilian, is a species of caecilian in the family Ichthyophiidae found in Thailand's provinces of Nakhon Si Thammarat and Trang, and possibly Malaysia.

It is known mostly from 11 specimens of various ages collected in 1958 by Edward Harrison Taylor at several localities in a wide area of tropical forest in southern Thailand. Later, it was recorded among the moist banks of a river near an abandoned zinc mine. It is likely to be threatened by habitat loss.
