= Upper Laos caecilian =

Conservation status
- Data Deficient (IUCN 3.1)

Scientific classification
- Kingdom: Animalia
- Phylum: Chordata
- Class: Amphibia
- Order: Gymnophiona
- Clade: Apoda
- Family: Ichthyophiidae
- Genus: Ichthyophis
- Species: I. laosensis

Binomial name
- Ichthyophis laosensis Taylor, 1969

Species of amphibian

The Upper Laos caecilian (Ichthyophis laosensis) is a species of amphibian in the family Ichthyophiidae. It is endemic to Laos and only known from a single specimen (holotype) collected from the imprecise type locality, "Upper Laos". Presumably a tropical moist forest species, nothing definite is known about its habitat or ecology.
