= Ichthyophis khumhzi =

Conservation status
- Data Deficient (IUCN 3.1)

Scientific classification
- Kingdom: Animalia
- Phylum: Chordata
- Class: Amphibia
- Order: Gymnophiona
- Clade: Apoda
- Family: Ichthyophiidae
- Genus: Ichthyophis
- Species: I. khumhzi

Binomial name
- Ichthyophis khumhzi Kamei et al., 2009

Species of amphibian

Ichthyophis khumhzi, the Khumhzi striped ichthyophis, is a species of caecilian found in India. It has narrow and irregular lateral yellow stripes. It can attain lengths larger than 400 mm (16 in). Its head is V-shaped while short; the animal shows scales as far anterior as its collars. The species is named after Khumhzi village, where the specimens were first collected.

== Description ==
This species counts with 127 vertebrae. The head, nuchal region and trunk are dorsoventrally compressed, with its body's maximal girth being near the midbody. Its tail is not upturned towards the tip. The animal's head is short, with a length of about 25.6 mm (1.01 in). Its eyes are equidistant from the lip and the top of the head, and are surrounded by a narrow whitish ring; its eye diameter approximates 0.6 mm, about the same as its nares', which are slightly anterior to level of the anterior margin of its mouth. Its teeth are slender and recurved, while its tongue is strongly plicate posteriorly. Its choanae are very narrow, the distance between them being five or six times their greatest width.

Denticulations present around its vent are poorly defined. While in preservation, the animal is of a pale lavender grey colour, with browner patches where stratum corneum is absent. Lateral stripes extending until about the fifth or sixth last annuli, broaden slightly. Narrow and pale lines are strongly marked along the margins of its lower jaw. In life, its dorsum is a dark brownish grey, while the venter is reddish grey, and its narrow lateral stripes a dull-yellow.

== Distribution ==
This species has only been observed in its type locality, near the river Agoh in Manipur and Nagaland, India.
