= Ichthyophis glandulosus =

Conservation status
- Data Deficient (IUCN 3.1)

Scientific classification
- Kingdom: Animalia
- Phylum: Chordata
- Class: Amphibia
- Order: Gymnophiona
- Clade: Apoda
- Family: Ichthyophiidae
- Genus: Ichthyophis
- Species: I. glandulosus

Binomial name
- Ichthyophis glandulosus Taylor, 1923

Species of amphibian

Ichthyophis glandulosus, the Basilan Island caecilian, is a species of amphibian in the family Ichthyophiidae endemic to the Philippines. Its natural habitats are subtropical or tropical moist lowland forests, subtropical or tropical moist montane forests, rivers, intermittent rivers, freshwater springs, plantations, rural gardens, heavily degraded former forest, irrigated land and seasonally flooded agricultural land. The population is unknown as only two specimens have been collected.
