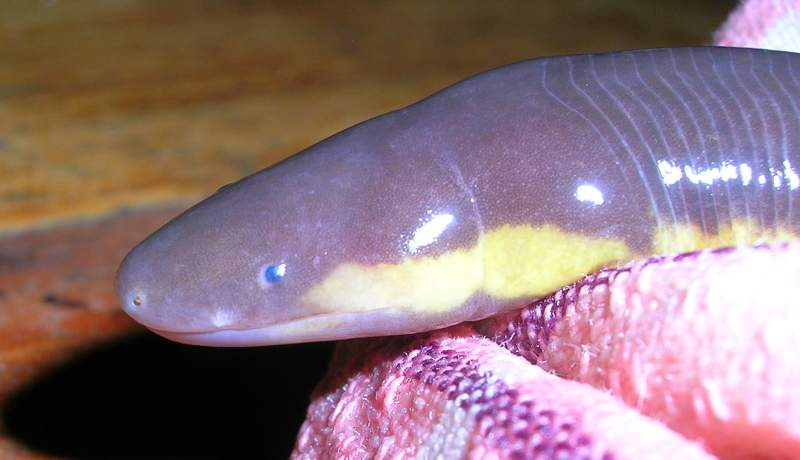
- Ichthyophis sp. from the Western Ghats

Scientific classification
- Kingdom: Animalia
- Phylum: Chordata
- Class: Amphibia
- Order: Gymnophiona
- Clade: Apoda
- Family: Ichthyophiidae; Taylor, 1968

Genera
- Ichthyophis; Uraeotyphlus

= Ichthyophiidae =

Family of amphibians

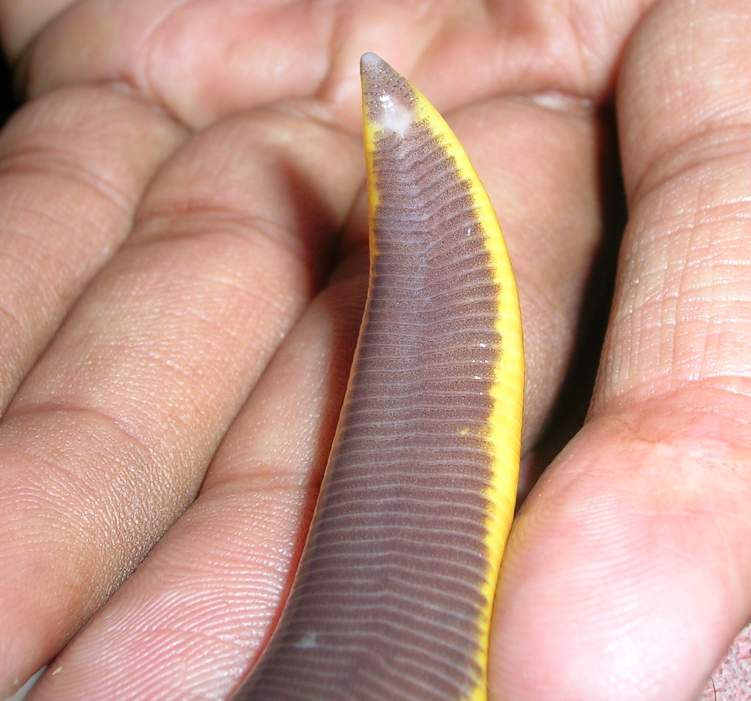
The vent is an important taxonomic feature for Ichthyophis identification

The Ichthyophiidae are the family of Asiatic tailed caecilians or fish caecilians found in South and Southeast Asia as well as southernmost China.

They are primitive caecilians, lacking many of the derived characters found in the other families. For example, their mouths are not recessed underneath their heads, they possess tails, and they have numerous scales on their bodies. However, they have two sets of muscles for closing the jaw, a feature unique to caecilians, but absent in the related family Rhinatrematidae.

They lay their eggs in cavities in moist soil, where they hatch into larvae that seek out streams or underground seepages, before metamorphosing into adults. Some evidence indicates the females may protect their eggs until they hatch.

== Taxonomy ==
Family Ichthyophiidae

- Genus Ichthyophis
  - Ichthyophis acuminatus
  - Ichthyophis alfredi
  - Ichthyophis asplenius
  - Ichthyophis atricollaris
  - Ichthyophis bannanicus
  - Ichthyophis beddomei
  - Ichthyophis bernisi
  - Ichthyophis biangularis
  - Ichthyophis billitonensis
  - Ichthyophis bombayensis
  - Ichthyophis cardamomensis
  - Ichthyophis catlocensis
  - Ichthyophis chaloensis
  - Ichthyophis daribokensis
  - Ichthyophis davidi
  - Ichthyophis dulitensis
  - Ichthyophis elongatus
  - Ichthyophis garoensis
  - Ichthyophis glandulosus
  - Ichthyophis glutinosus
  - Ichthyophis humphreyi
  - Ichthyophis hypocyaneus
  - Ichthyophis javanicus
  - Ichthyophis khumhzi
  - Ichthyophis kodaguensis
  - Ichthyophis kohtaoensis
  - Ichthyophis lakimi
  - Ichthyophis laosensis
  - Ichthyophis larutensis
  - Ichthyophis longicephalus
  - Ichthyophis mindanaoensis
  - Ichthyophis monochrous
  - Ichthyophis moustakius
  - Ichthyophis multicolor
  - Ichthyophis nguyenorum
  - Ichthyophis nigroflavus
  - Ichthyophis nokrekensis
  - Ichthyophis orthoplicatus
  - Ichthyophis paucidentulus
  - Ichthyophis paucisulcus
  - Ichthyophis pauli
  - Ichthyophis pseudangularis
  - Ichthyophis sendenyu
  - Ichthyophis sikkimensis
  - Ichthyophis singaporensis
  - Ichthyophis sumatranus
  - Ichthyophis supachaii
  - Ichthyophis tricolor
  - Ichthyophis weberi
  - Ichthyophis youngorum
- Genus Uraeotyphlus
  - Uraeotyphlus gansi
  - Uraeotyphlus interruptus
  - Uraeotyphlus malabaricus
  - Uraeotyphlus menoni
  - Uraeotyphlus narayani
  - Uraeotyphlus oommeni
  - Uraeotyphlus oxyurus
