= Ichthyophis humphreyi =

Conservation status
- Data Deficient (IUCN 3.1)

Scientific classification
- Kingdom: Animalia
- Phylum: Chordata
- Class: Amphibia
- Order: Gymnophiona
- Clade: Apoda
- Family: Ichthyophiidae
- Genus: Ichthyophis
- Species: I. humphreyi

Binomial name
- Ichthyophis humphreyi Taylor, 1973

Species of amphibian

Ichthyophis humphreyi, or Humphrey's caecilian, is a species of caecilian found presumably in tropical Asia. Its validity as a species, habits, habitat, and description are nebulous, as it is described from one larval specimen.
