= Ichthyophis atricollaris =

Conservation status
- Data Deficient (IUCN 3.1)

Scientific classification
- Kingdom: Animalia
- Phylum: Chordata
- Class: Amphibia
- Order: Gymnophiona
- Clade: Apoda
- Family: Ichthyophiidae
- Genus: Ichthyophis
- Species: I. atricollaris

Binomial name
- Ichthyophis atricollaris Taylor, 1965

Species of amphibian

Ichthyophis atricollaris, also known as the Long Bloee caecilian, is a species of caecilian in the family Ichthyophiidae. It is endemic to Sarawak, Borneo (Malaysia), and only known from its imprecise type locality, "Long Bloee, Boven Mahakkam, Borneo". The type series were collected during the Nieuwenhuis expedition to Borneo and were deposited at the Rijksmuseum van Natuurlijke Historie, Leiden.

== Description ==
The type series consists of three individuals of unspecified sex that measure 204–285 mm (8.0–11.2 in) in total length. The tail is short, 4–5 mm (0.16–0.20 in) in length. The body is 8–11 mm (0.31–0.43 in) wide. There are 275–310 folds dorsally; the folds are ventrally incomplete for the last one-fifth of the body. The head is short and the eyes are small; the snout projects slightly above the mouth. Dorsal coloration is brownish violet. The ventral side and the head are lighter. The neck is nearly uniformly dark above and below. A broad yellow stripe starts from the second collar and terminates at level of the vent.

== Habitat and conservation ==
Ichthyophis atricollaris is presumed to inhabit tropical rainforest and have subterranean life style. Threats to it are not known. It is not known to occur in protected areas.
