= Ichthyophis daribokensis =

Scientific classification
- Domain: Eukaryota
- Kingdom: Animalia
- Phylum: Chordata
- Class: Amphibia
- Order: Gymnophiona
- Clade: Apoda
- Family: Ichthyophiidae
- Genus: Ichthyophis
- Species: I. daribokensis

Binomial name
- Ichthyophis daribokensis Mathew & Sen, 2009

Species of amphibian

Ichthyophis daribokensis, or Daribok's striped caecilian, is a species of amphibian found in Assam in northern India.
