= Ichthyophis garoensis =

Conservation status
- Data Deficient (IUCN 3.1)

Scientific classification
- Kingdom: Animalia
- Phylum: Chordata
- Class: Amphibia
- Order: Gymnophiona
- Clade: Apoda
- Family: Ichthyophiidae
- Genus: Ichthyophis
- Species: I. garoensis

Binomial name
- Ichthyophis garoensis Pillai and Ravichandran, 1999
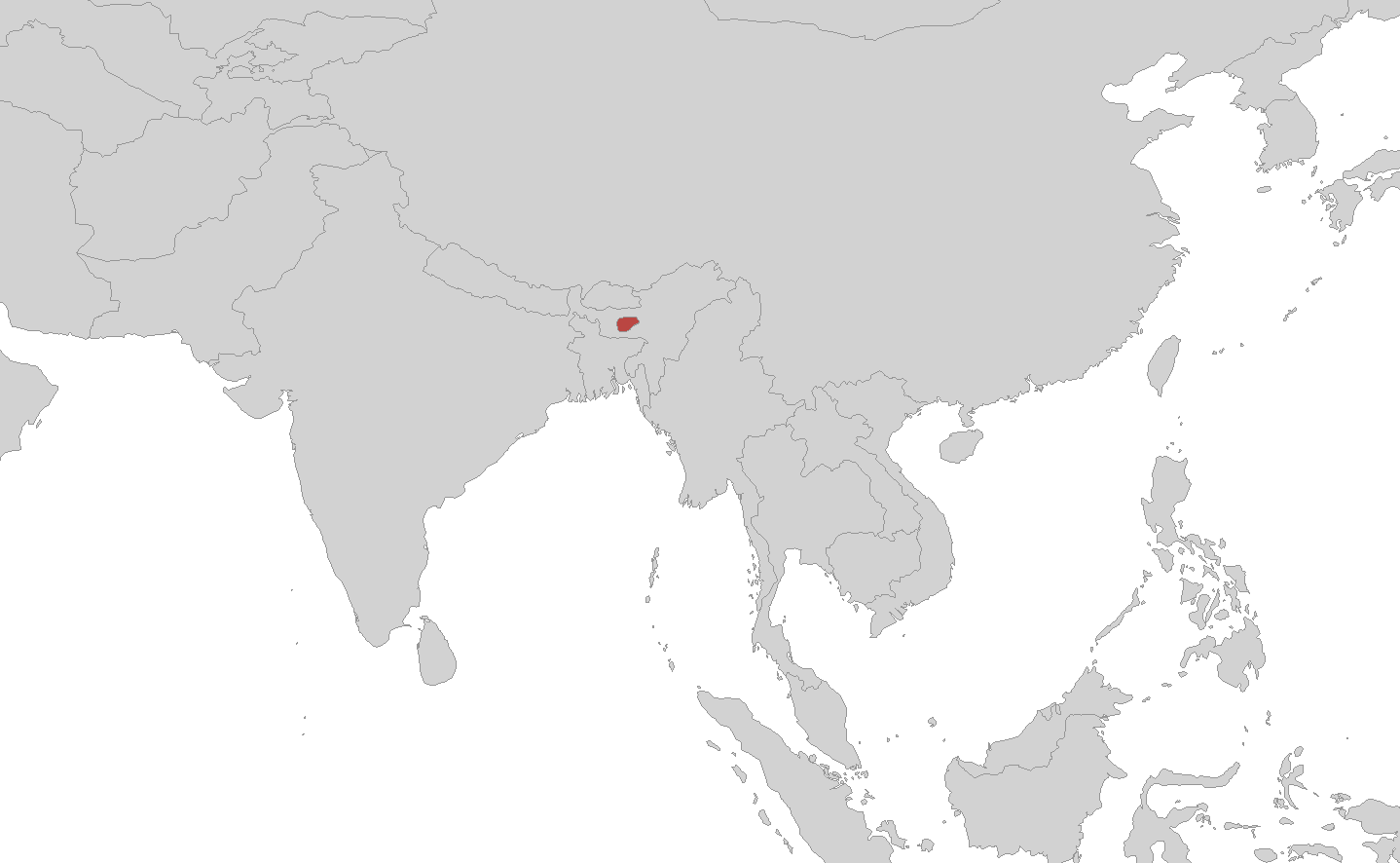
- Ichthyophis garoensis range

Synonyms
- Ichthyophis husaini Pillai and Ravichandran, 1999

Species of amphibian

Ichthyophis garoensis, the Garo Hills caecilian or Garo Hills striped caecilian, is a species of caecilian found in Assam and Meghalaya in north-eastern India as well as in Bangladesh. The Husain's caecilian Ichthyophis husaini was until 2016 considered a separate species.

It is a subterranean caecilian that lives in the moist leaf-litter of tropical forests at elevations of 410–530 m (1,350–1,740 ft) above sea level. It is typically found close to streams and other waterbodies.
