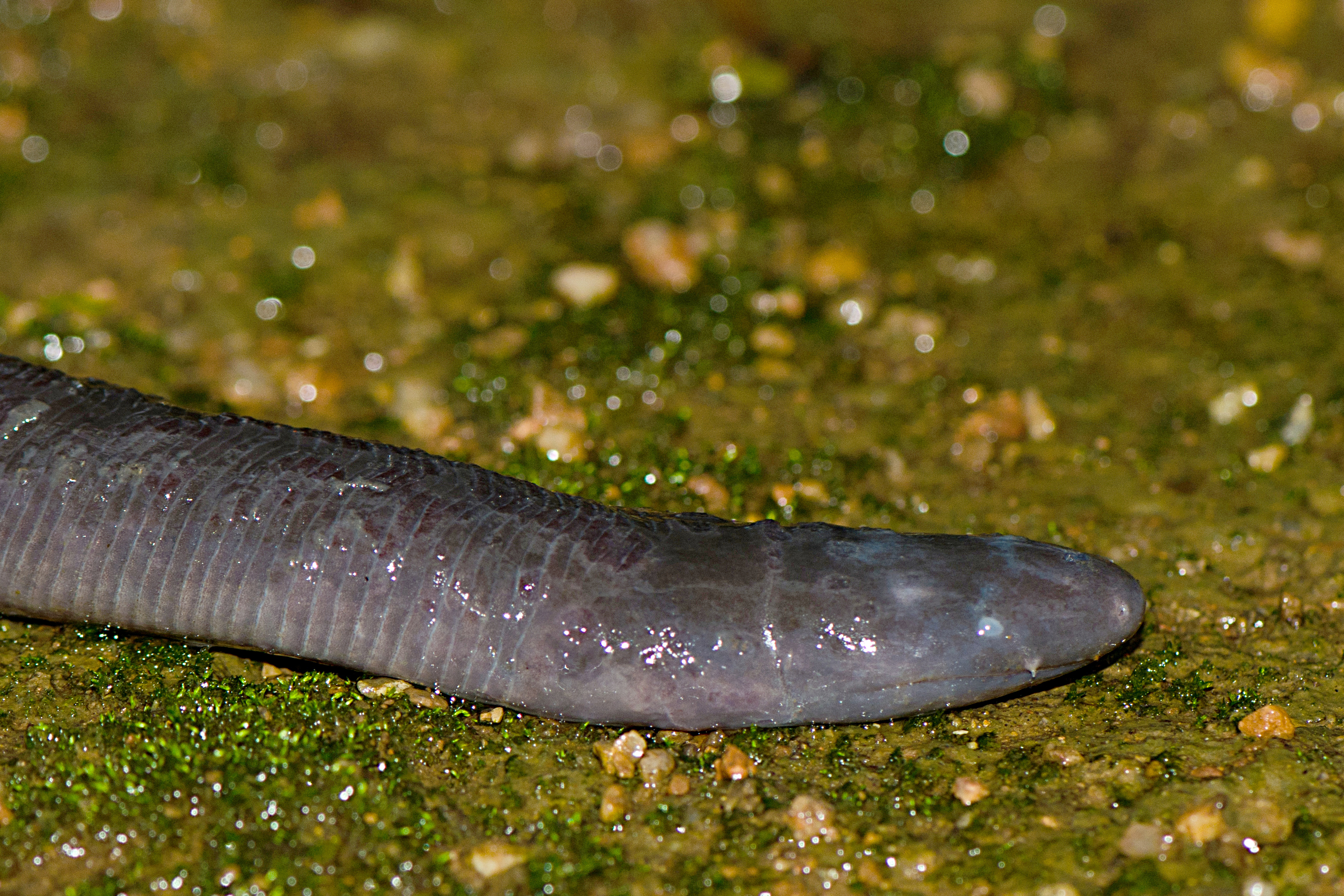

Scientific classification
- Kingdom: Animalia
- Phylum: Chordata
- Class: Amphibia
- Order: Gymnophiona
- Clade: Apoda
- Family: Ichthyophiidae
- Genus: Ichthyophis
- Species: I. bombayensis

Binomial name
- Ichthyophis bombayensis Taylor, 1960

Synonyms
- Ichthyophis malabarensis Taylor, 1960; Ichthyophis peninsularis Taylor, 1960; Ichthyophis subterrestris Taylor, 1960

= Bombay caecilian =

Species of amphibian

The Bombay caecilian (Ichthyophis bombayensis) is an amphibian found in India. This rather large species is found in the northern Western Ghats. The eyes are distinct and surrounded by a light ring. The tentacle is placed closer to the lip than the eye. A dark brown or greyish-brown species, it has no lateral stripes.

The three names below are presently considered to be junior synonyms of I. bombayensis, as it was recently shown that all the unstriped, long-tailed Ichthyophis from the Western Ghats showed little genetic variation.

- I. malabarensis – southern Western Ghats, known with certainty only from the type locality
- I. peninsularis – known only from the type specimen, exact locality not known
- I. subterrestris – known only from the type specimen, from Western Ghats south of Palghat Gap (Cochin and Travancore areas)
