= Ichthyophis asplenius =

Conservation status
- Data Deficient (IUCN 3.1)

Scientific classification
- Kingdom: Animalia
- Phylum: Chordata
- Class: Amphibia
- Order: Gymnophiona
- Clade: Apoda
- Family: Ichthyophiidae
- Genus: Ichthyophis
- Species: I. asplenius

Binomial name
- Ichthyophis asplenius Taylor, 1965

Synonyms
- Caudacaecilia asplenia (Taylor, 1965)

Species of amphibian

Ichthyophis asplenius is a species of amphibian in the family Ichthyophiidae found in Malaysia and possibly Thailand. It is also known as broad-striped caecilian, Boven Mahakkam caecilian and Malayan caecilian. It is only known with certainty from Mahakam River and Matang Hunting Reserve Its natural habitats are subtropical or tropical moist lowland forests, rivers, intermittent rivers, plantations, rural gardens, heavily degraded former forest, irrigated land, and seasonally flooded agricultural land.
