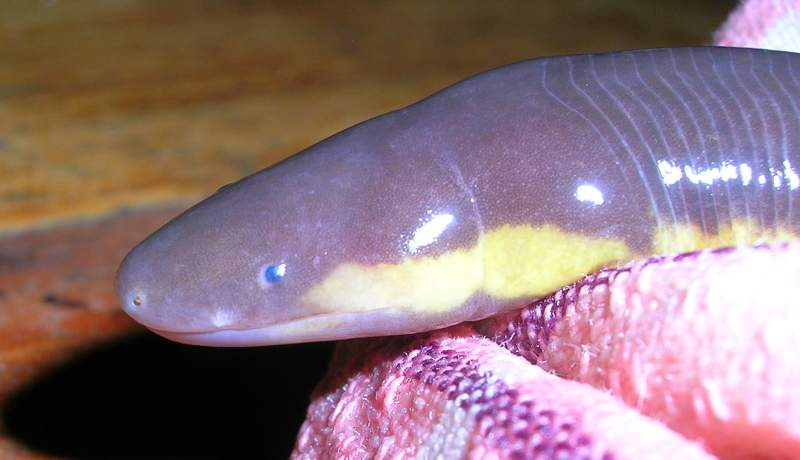

Scientific classification
- Kingdom: Animalia
- Phylum: Chordata
- Class: Amphibia
- Order: Gymnophiona
- Clade: Apoda
- Family: Ichthyophiidae
- Genus: Ichthyophis; Fitzinger, 1826

Species
- See text

Synonyms
- Epicrium Wagler, 1828; Caudacaecilia Taylor, 1968

= Ichthyophis =

Genus of amphibians

Ichthyophis (from Ancient Greek ἰχθύς (ikhthús), meaning "fish", and ὄφις (óphis), meaning "snake", and thus, "fish snake") is a genus of caecilians found in Southeast Asia, the southern Philippines, and the western Indo-Australian Archipelago.

In Sri Lanka, three species occur. All are found in almost all habitats, but are known to prefer moist ones. The most common is Ichthyophis glutinosus, which is found in almost all altitudes; the others are I. orthoplicatus, which is found in similar habitat to I. glutinosus, but will not be found in lowlands below 460 metres (1,510 ft) above sea level; and I. pseudangularis, found in lowlands below 1,200 metres (3,900 ft) ASL. A new species was recently discovered called Ichthyophis multicolor.

== Species ==
Binomial name and author	Common name
Ichthyophis acuminatus Taylor, 1960	pointed-headed caecilian
Ichthyophis alfredi Mathew & Sen, 2009
Ichthyophis asplenius Taylor, 1965
Ichthyophis atricollaris Taylor, 1965	Long Bloee caecilian
Ichthyophis bannanicus Yang, 1984	Banna caecilian
Ichthyophis beddomei Peters, 1880	yellow-striped caecilian
Ichthyophis bernisi Salvador, 1975	Indonesian caecilian
Ichthyophis biangularis Taylor, 1965	angular caecilian
Ichthyophis billitonensis Taylor, 1965	Billiton Island caecilian
Ichthyophis bombayensis Taylor, 1960	Bombay caecilian
Ichthyophis cardamomensis Geissler et al., 2014	Cardamom Mountains caecilian
Ichthyophis catlocensis Geissler et al., 2014	Cat Loc caecilian
Ichthyophis chaloensis Geissler et al., 2014	Cha Lo caecilian
Ichthyophis daribokensis Mathew & Sen, 2009
Ichthyophis dulitensis Taylor, 1960	Mount Dulit caecilian
Ichthyophis elongatus Taylor, 1965	elongated caecilian
Ichthyophis garoensis Pillai & Ravichandran, 1999	Garo Hills caecilian
Ichthyophis glandulosus Taylor, 1923	Basilan Island caecilian
Ichthyophis glutinosus (Linnaeus, 1758)	Ceylon caecilian
Ichthyophis humphreyi Taylor, 1973	Humphrey's caecilian
Ichthyophis hypocyaneus (Boie, 1827)	Bantam caecilian
Ichthyophis javanicus Taylor, 1960	Javan caecilian
Ichthyophis khumhzi Kamei et al., 2007	Khumhzi striped ichthyophis
Ichthyophis kodaguensis Wilkinson, Gower, Govindappa & Venkatachalaiah, 2007	Kodagu striped caecilian
Ichthyophis kohtaoensis Taylor, 1960	Koa Tao Island caecilian
Ichthyophis lakimi Nishikawa, Matsui & Yambun, 2012
Ichthyophis laosensis Taylor, 1969	Upper Laos caecilian
Ichthyophis larutensis Taylor, 1960
Ichthyophis longicephalus Pillai, 1986	long-headed caecilian
Ichthyophis mindanaoensis Taylor, 1960	Mindanao Island caecilian
Ichthyophis monochrous (Bleeker, 1858)	Western Borneo caecilian
Ichthyophis moustakius Kamei et al., 2007
Ichthyophis multicolor Wilkinson et al., 2014
Ichthyophis nguyenorum Nishikawa, Matsui, and Orlov, 2012
Ichthyophis nigroflavus Taylor, 1960
Ichthyophis nokrekensis Mathew & Sen, 2009
Ichthyophis orthoplicatus Taylor, 1965	Pattipola caecilian
Ichthyophis paucidentulus Taylor, 1960
Ichthyophis paucisulcus Taylor, 1960	Siantar caecilian
Ichthyophis pauli Nishikawa, Matsui, Sudin & Wong, 2013
Ichthyophis pseudangularis Taylor, 1965	Taylor's caecilian
Ichthyophis sendenyu Kamei et al., 2007
Ichthyophis sikkimensis Taylor, 1960	Sikkimese caecilian
Ichthyophis singaporensis Taylor, 1960	Singapore caecilian
Ichthyophis sumatranus Taylor, 1960	Sumatra caecilian
Ichthyophis supachaii Taylor, 1960	Supachai's caecilian
Ichthyophis tricolor Annandale, 1909	three-colored caecilian
Ichthyophis weberi Taylor, 1920
Ichthyophis youngorum Taylor, 1960	Doi Suthep caecilian
