= Ichthyophis monochrous =

Conservation status
- Data Deficient (IUCN 3.1)

Scientific classification
- Kingdom: Animalia
- Phylum: Chordata
- Class: Amphibia
- Order: Gymnophiona
- Clade: Apoda
- Family: Ichthyophiidae
- Genus: Ichthyophis
- Species: I. monochrous

Binomial name
- Ichthyophis monochrous (Bleeker, 1858)
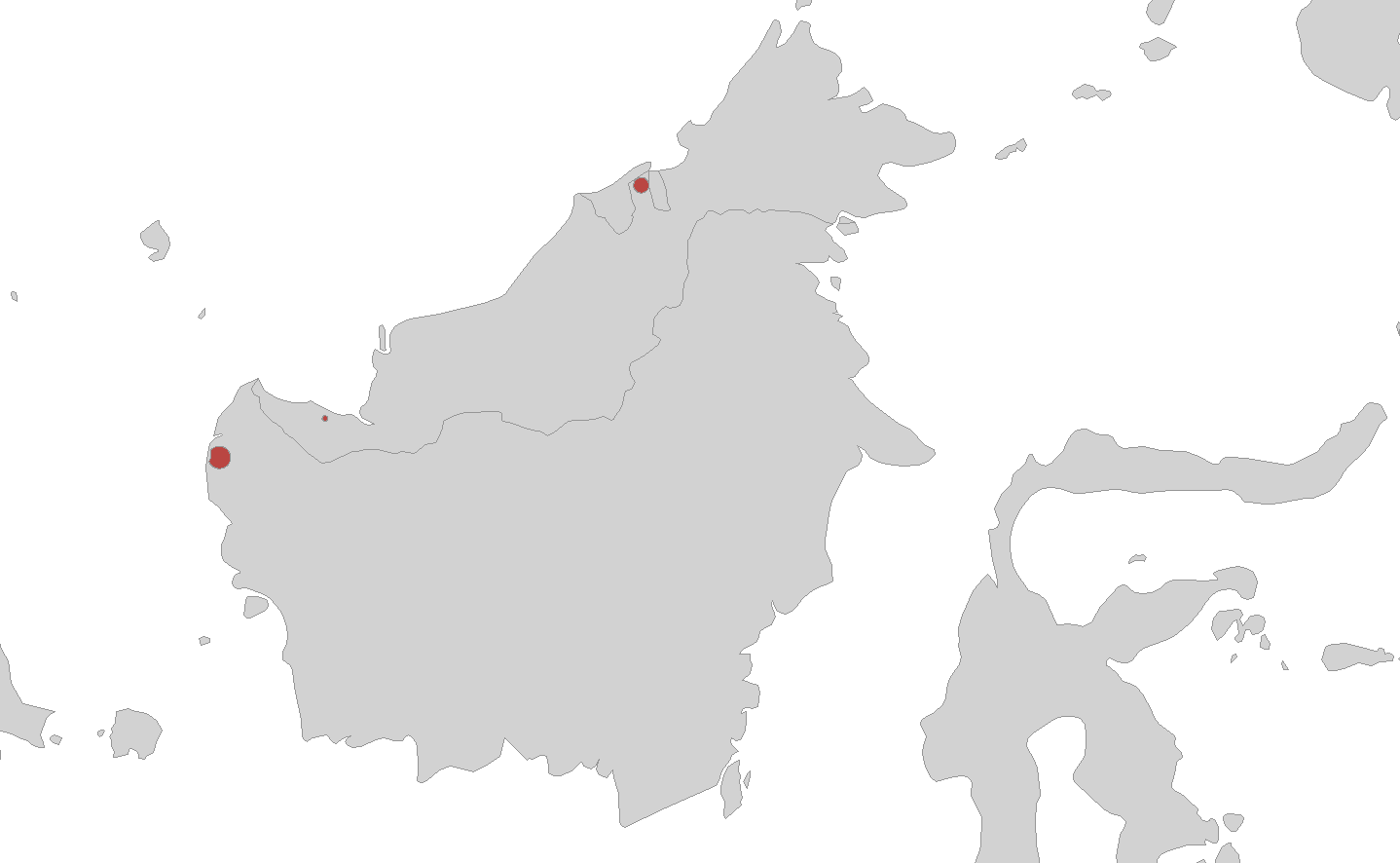
- Western Borneo caecilian range

Synonyms
- Epicrium monochrous Bleeker, 1858

Species of amphibian

Ichthyophis monochrous, the Western Borneo caecilian or black caecilian, is a species of amphibian in the family Ichthyophiidae. It is endemic to northern Borneo and known from western Kalimantan (Indonesia) and Sarawak (Malaysia), likely occurring also in Brunei. It is a little-known species known from only a few specimens. It presumably inhabits tropical moist forest. Adults are likely subterranean.

== Description ==
Ichthyophis monochrous is a moderately slender caecilian. The holotype measures 232 mm (9.1 in) in length and about 10 mm (0.39 in) in width. The head is 9 mm (0.35 in) long and has visible eyes. Tail is short (3.8 mm) but distinct. The skin has about 247 ring-shaped folds (annuli) and is strongly glandular. In life the specimen is reported to have been violet-brown in colour.)
