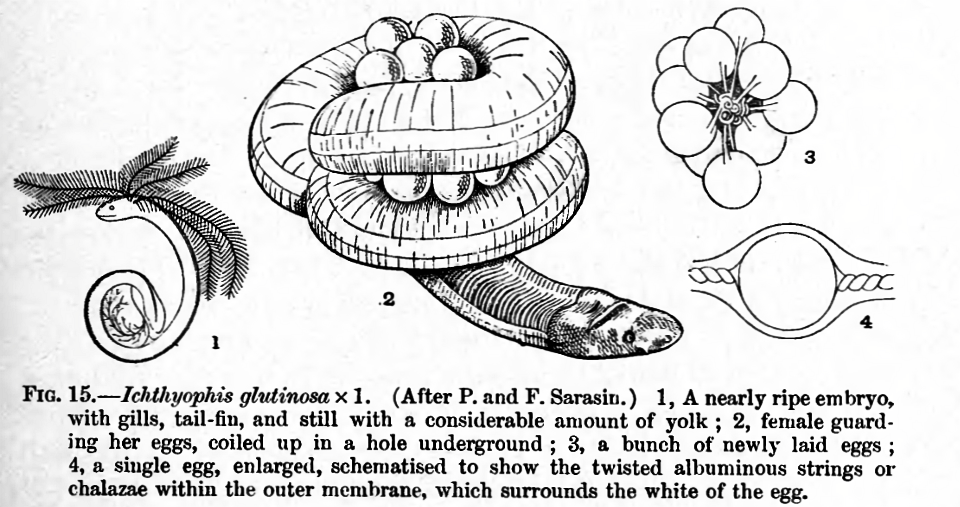

Conservation status
- Vulnerable (IUCN 3.1)

Scientific classification
- Kingdom: Animalia
- Phylum: Chordata
- Class: Amphibia
- Order: Gymnophiona
- Clade: Apoda
- Family: Ichthyophiidae
- Genus: Ichthyophis
- Species: I. glutinosus

Binomial name
- Ichthyophis glutinosus (Linnaeus, 1758)
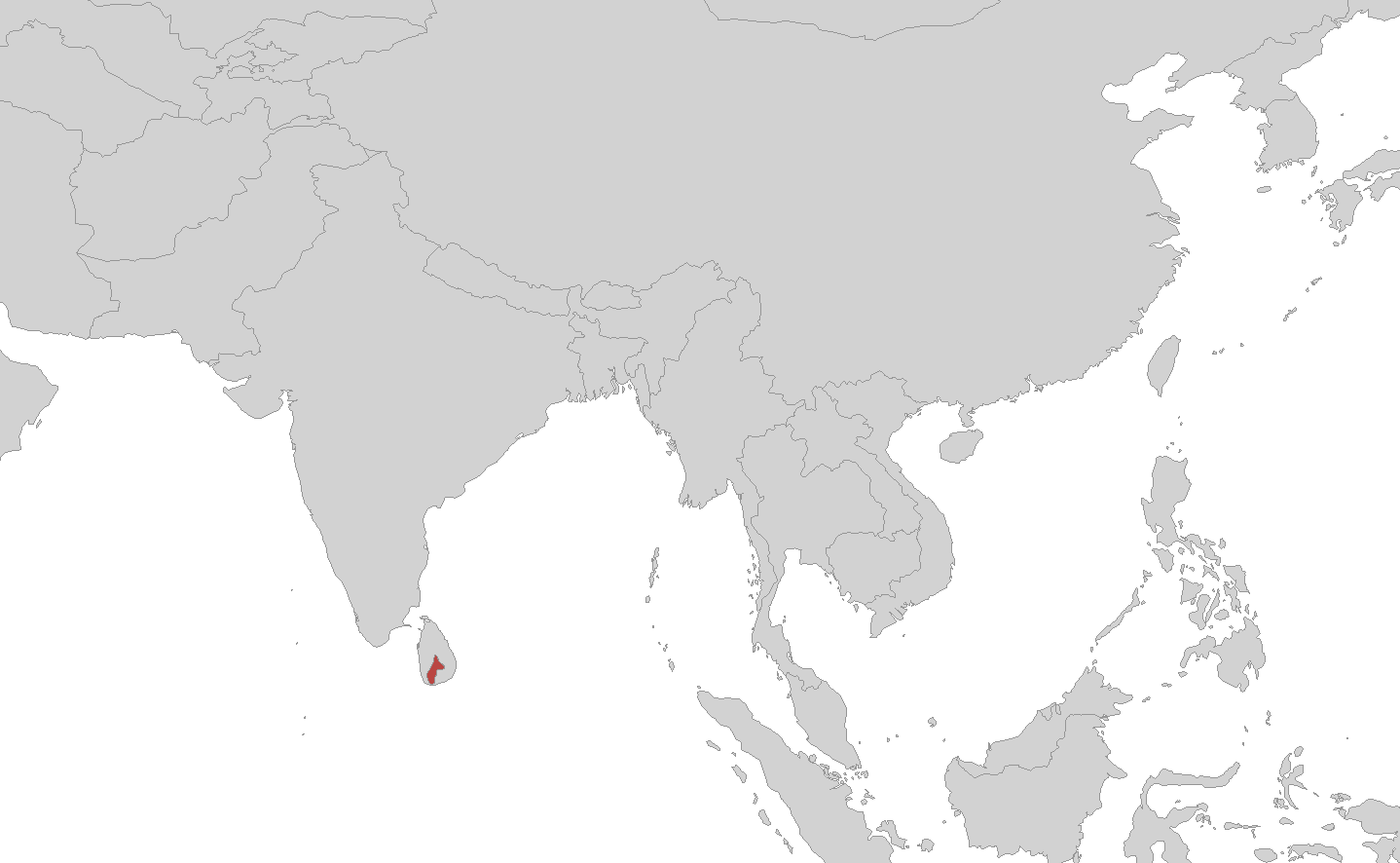
- Ichthyophis glutinosus range

= Ichthyophis glutinosus =

Species of amphibian

Ichthyophis glutinosus, the Ceylon caecilian or common yellow-banded caecilian, is a species of caecilian in the family Ichthyophiidae endemic to Sri Lanka. Its natural habitats are moist tropical and subtropical forests and pastures.

== Description ==
The Ceylon caecilian grows to about 23 to 40 cm (9.1 to 15.7 in) long and resembles a large earthworm. The skin is formed into over 300 transverse folds which give the caecilian the appearance of being segmented. The head has a rounded snout and a pair of extensible tentacles near the mouth, rather closer to the eyes than to the nostrils. The colour of this caecilian is steely blue above and pale yellow underneath, with a yellow band running along either side of the body.

== Distribution and habitat ==
The Ceylon caecilian is endemic to southwestern and central Sri Lanka. It has also been reported to occur in northeastern India, but more likely this sighting referred to a different species. It lives in burrows in damp earth or leaf litter in subtropical or tropical moist lowland and montane forests, subtropical or tropical swamps, cleared forested areas, and pasturelands at elevations of up to 1,355 m (4,446 ft) above sea level.

== Biology ==
The Ceylon caecilian feeds on earthworms and other small invertebrates. When it has captured an earthworm, it reverses into its burrow, sometimes twisting its head around or twirling its whole body to subdue its prey.

Reproduction takes place in underground chambers or other hidden places, where the female lays strings of about 30 white, jelly-coated eggs. She then coils her body around the eggs and broods them until they hatch into larvae about 7 to 11 cm (2.8 to 4.3 in) long. The larvae move out of the burrow and wriggle to pools or water courses that form in the wet season. They have three pairs of external feathery gills, a lateral line system, and a tail fin which enables them to swim. The gills persist, but they have lost their lateral lines by the time they undergo a relatively slow metamorphosis at about nine months old.

== Status ==
The Ceylon caecilian is listed as being of "vulnerable" by the IUCN Red List of Threatened Species. This is because, although its range is probably less than 20,000 square kilometres (7,700 sq mi), it is locally common in the areas in which it lives and does not seem to have any significant threats. It is a very adaptable animal and can cope with changes in its habitat. Large areas of its range are found in well-protected national parks, including the Sinharaja World Heritage Site, the Knuckles Range Forest Reserve, the Dellawa Forest Reserve and the Udawatta Kele Sanctuary.
