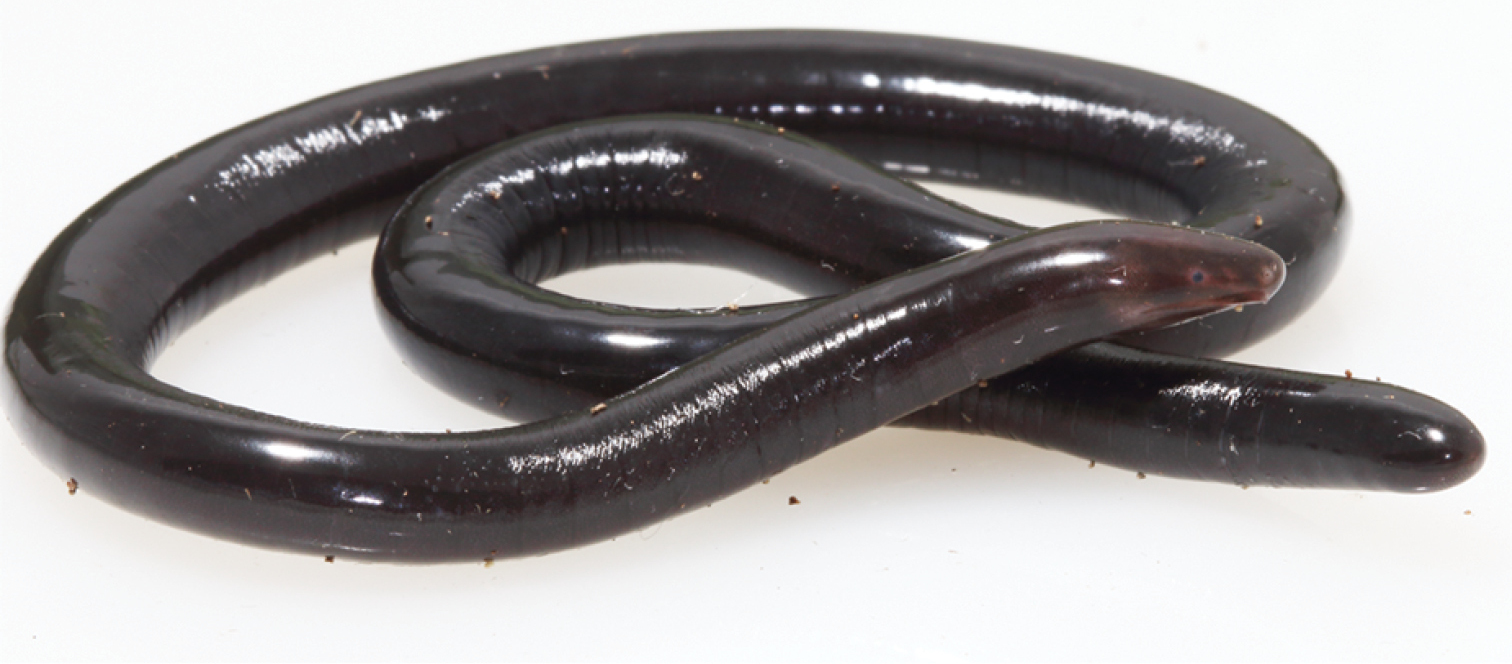

Scientific classification
- Kingdom: Animalia
- Phylum: Chordata
- Class: Amphibia
- Order: Gymnophiona
- Clade: Apoda
- Family: Caeciliidae
- Genus: Caecilia
- Species: C. pulchraserrana

Binomial name
- Caecilia pulchraserrana Acosta Galvis, Torres & Pulido Santacruz, 2019

= Caecilia pulchraserrana =

Species of amphibian

Caecilia pulchraserrana is a species of gymnophionic amphibian in the family Caeciliidae, which can be found on the western slopes of the Eastern Ranges and is endemic to Yariguíes National Park, in Santander Department, Colombia.

It can be differentiated from other species of cecilia by its small size, with length varying from 195 to 232 millimeters, for having only incomplete ring-shaped primary grooves, with a number ranging from 100 to 104, smaller than the others, and for having parts of its body salmon colored. It has fossorial habits, spending most of its time buried, and can quickly dig tunnels if it needs to escape quickly.

It was described by a trio of researchers, with the paper being published on October 30, 2019 in the scientific journal ZooKeys. To attest to its speciation, analyses were performed on genes from its mitochondrial DNA, as well as morphological comparisons, which confirmed it. Its name was chosen with the help of local people and is an allusion to the place where it was found.

== Taxonomy, history, and etymology ==
The species was described by Alexander von Humboldt Institute researchers: Andrés Acosta-Galvis, Mauricio Torres and Paola Pulido-Santacruz, and the results were published by ZooKeys on October 30, 2019. It could be identified as belonging to the genus Caecilia from phylogenetic analyses, making comparison of samples of its mitochondrial DNA with other neotropical species of gymnophionans from different families, having an 84% compatibility with this genus. Besides genetic factors, such a relationship can be confirmed morphologically, because its eyes are not covered by bone and because it has tentacles below the nostrils. By the same methods, it was possible to certify the speciation of Caecilia pulchraserrana, considering that genetically the closest species, C. volcani, has only 58% compatibility with it, and because it has a combination of features that differs from the others, such as the arrangement of 100 to 104 incomplete rings on the back, not being large, measuring between 195 and 232 millimeters, having salmon colored lips and ventral margins of the jawbone, and the absence of secondary rings.

To conduct the study, the researchers contacted the local population to help find the individuals in the wild, which were later collected to be studied. The holotype was found on February 25, 2018 in the La Belleza footpath, in the city of El Carmen de Chucurí, in Santander Department, at an altitude of 789 meters from sea level and it was an adult female. Four paratypes were also collected, two males and two females.

Its specific epithet was formed by the juxtaposition of the Latin feminine noun pulchra, which means "beauty", with the Spanish feminine adjective serrana, which indicates something that comes from a mountain, alluding to the place where it was found, the La Belleza footpath, which is located in a mountainous region. This name was chosen by the population, who, together with the researchers, suggested names, then held a vote to select the favorite.

== Distribution ==
Currently, only two sites are known to harbor the species, both located on the western slopes of the Eastern Ranges, more precisely in the Yariguíes National Park, in the municipality of El Carmen de Chucurí, Colombia, whose altitudes are 731 and 789 meters above sea level. It inhabits marshy regions surrounded by secondary forests and with a large amount of heliconias present. It has fossorial habits, quickly creating tunnels to escape if it feels threatened. Counting this, by 2020, 35 species of gymnophionos were known in Colombia, with 23 belonging to the same family.

== Description ==
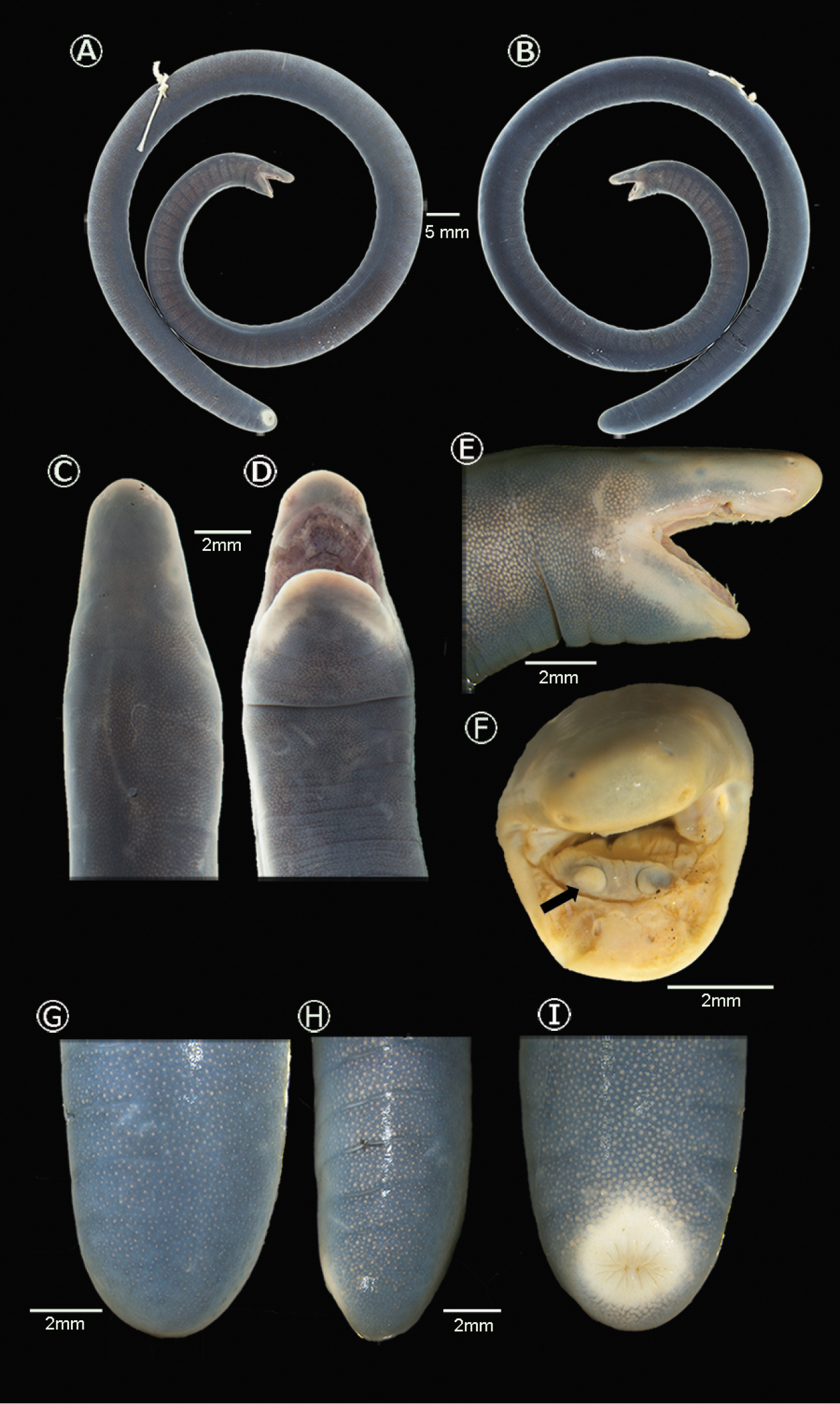
View of a fixed individual from different angles.

Caecilia pulchraserrana is a small species, measuring 195 to 232 millimeters in length, with the head representing two to four percent of that measurement and appearing flatter and narrower than the rest of the body when viewed dorsally or ventrally. Its snout measures approximately 1.6 millimeters and has a rounded tip, and the area between the eyes and nostrils is smooth. Its eyes are small but visible, as are the nostrils, whose edges are prominent. The protective cavity of its tentacles are located at the sides of the mouth, and are circular, small, and slightly protruding, while its tongue is attached to the front of the mouth and has a smooth texture with some longitudinal grooves. Its teeth are pointed and curved, and decrease in size as they approach the bottom of the mouth and extend toward the choana, which is ovoid. Its body is cylindrical, slightly vertically flattened, and has one hundred to 104 ring-shaped primary sulcus that incompletely surround its body, and it does not have secondary sulcus between the primary ones, as occurs in some species. Its cloaca is circular and has an enlarged disk around it, with seven or eight denticulations in the anterior and posterior regions.

Its body, when alive, has a dark brown coloration, which is a little lighter in the ventral region and a little darker on the sides of the ring grooves, as well as the arrangement of some salmon colored chromatophores on the skin. The region between the eyes and the nostril, the edges of the mandibles, the lips and the tentacular region are salmon and its eyes are violet-blue. The individuals, when fixed in 70% ethanol, usually have their coloration changed, with the brown areas turning grayish and the salmon areas turning yellowish, and the chromatophores changing to khaki.
