= L. leucocephala =

L. leucocephala may refer to:

- Leucaena leucocephala, the white leadtree jumbay or white popinac, a small tropical tree species
- Lomandra leucocephala, a plant species in the genus Lomandra found in New South Wales, Australia

== See also ==
- Leucocephala (disambiguation)
