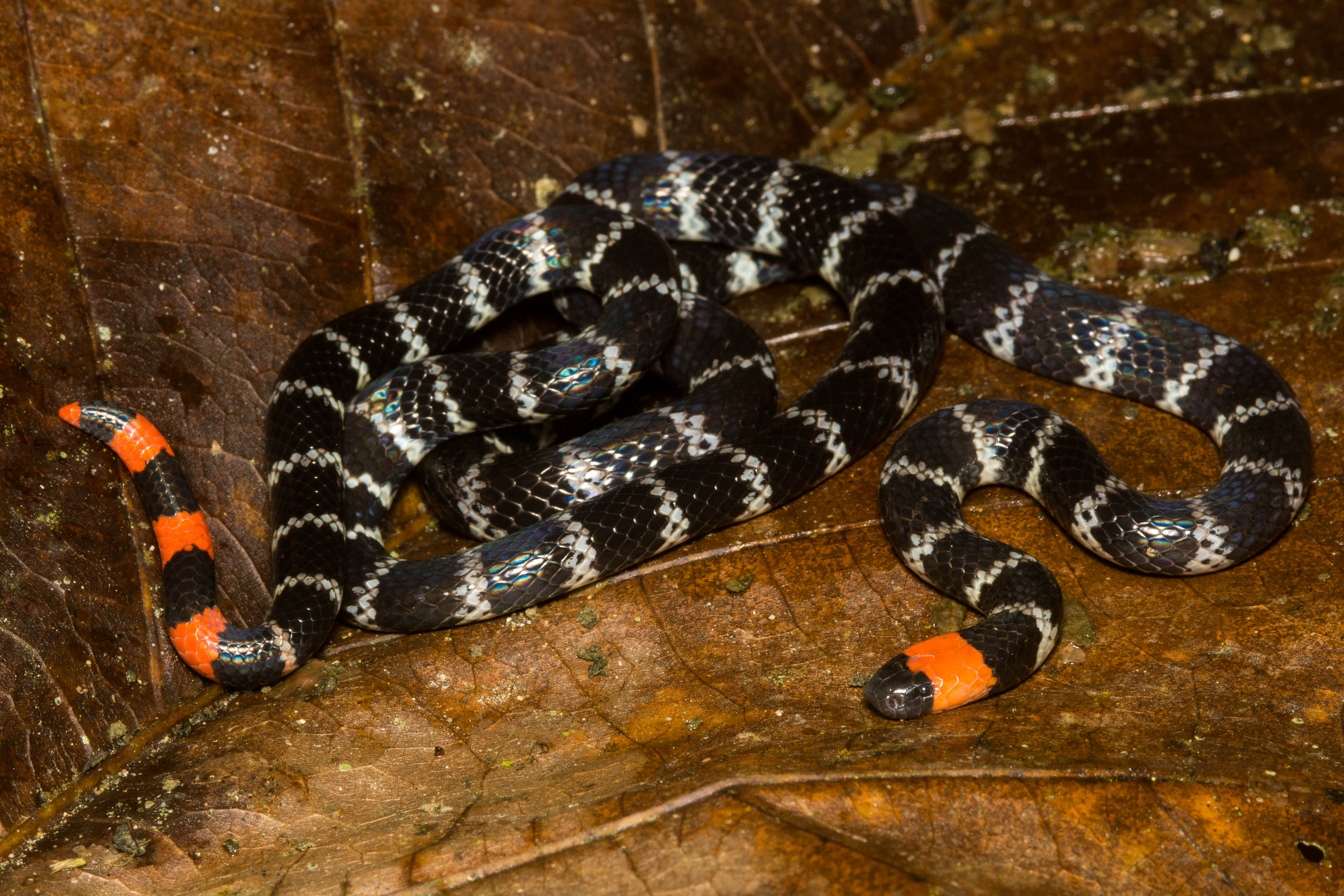

Conservation status
- Least Concern (IUCN 3.1)

Scientific classification
- Kingdom: Animalia
- Phylum: Chordata
- Class: Reptilia
- Order: Squamata
- Suborder: Serpentes
- Family: Elapidae
- Genus: Micrurus
- Species: M. mipartitus

Binomial name
- Micrurus mipartitus (A.M.C. Duméril, Bibron & A.H.A. Duméril, 1854)
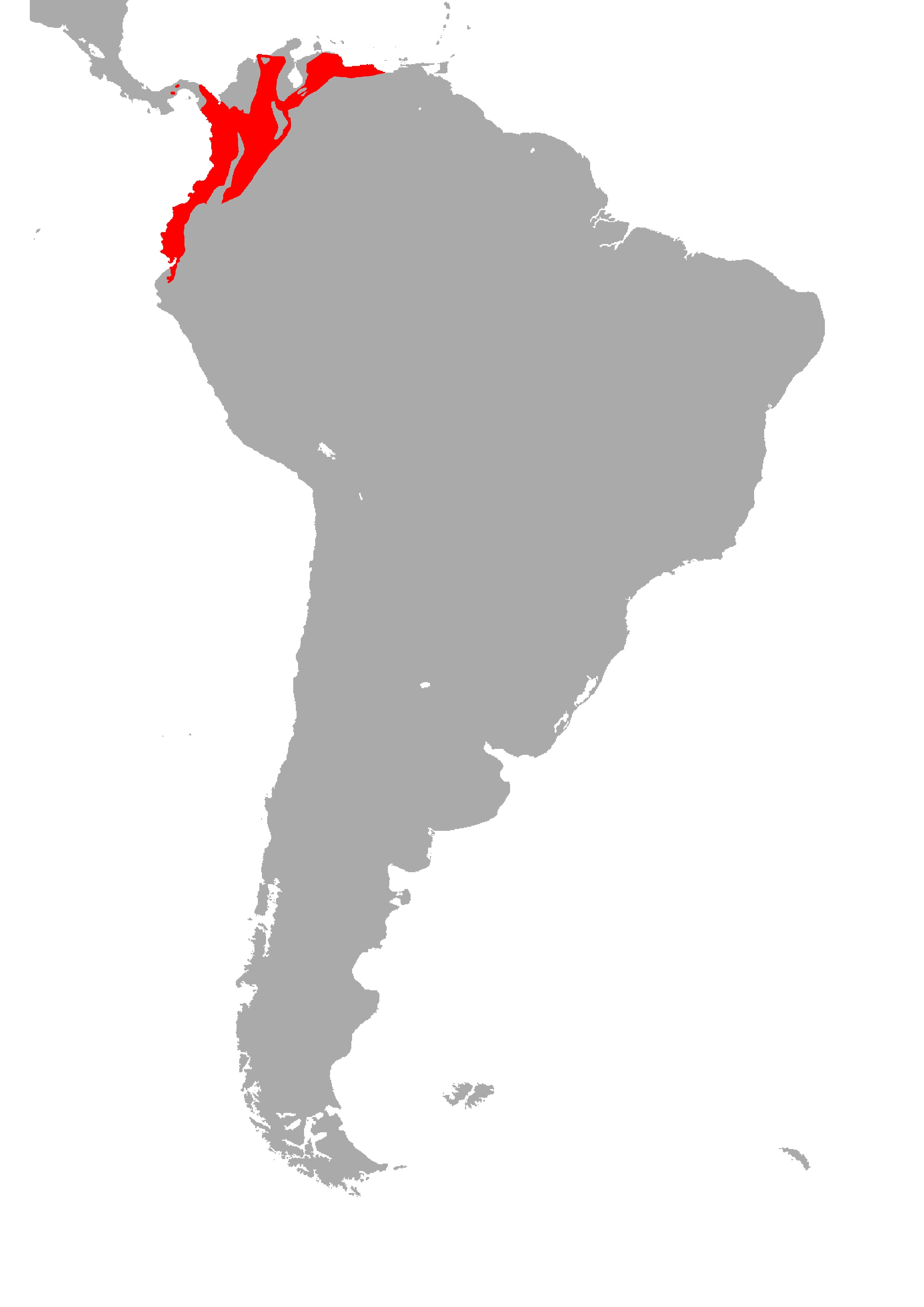

Synonyms
- Elaps mipartitus A.M.C. Duméril, Bibron & A.H.A. Duméril, 1854 (basionym)

= Micrurus mipartitus =

Species of snake

Micrurus mipartitus, also known commonly as the red-tailed coral snake, the many-banded coral snake, and rabo de ají in local Spanish, is a species of venomous snake in the family Elapidae. The species is native to Central America and northern South America. The red-tailed coral snake is common in agricultural areas in Colombia. Its highly neurotoxic venom is known to cause seizures in its prey by activating nerve proteins responsible for seizures within it.

== Subspecies ==
Five subspecies are recognized as being valid, including the nominotypical subspecies.

- Micrurus mipartitus mipartitus (A.M.C. Duméril, Bibron & A.H.A. Duméril, 1854) – Pacific red-tailed coral snake
- Micrurus mipartitus anomalus (Boulenger, 1896) – Santa Marta red-tailed coral snake
- Micrurus mipartitus decussatus (A.M.C. Duméril, Bibron & A.H.A. Duméril, 1854) – Andean red-tailed coral snake
- Micrurus mipartitus popayanensis Ayerbe, M.A. Tidwell & M. Tidwell, 1990 – Popayan red-tailed coral snake
- Micrurus mipartitus rozei Golay, Chiszar, H.M. Smith & van Breukelen, 1999 – Roze's red-tailed coral snake

Nota bene: A trinomial authority in parentheses indicates that the subspecies was originally described in a genus other than Micrurus.

== Etymology ==
The subspecific name, rozei, is in honor of Latvian-American herpetologist Janis A. Roze.

== Distribution ==
Micrurus mipartitus occurs in Central America and South America. Limits of its range vary by source and may include Nicaragua and Costa Rica in the north, although older records from Nicaragua and Costa Rica likely refer to M. multifasciatus. The IUCN Redlist restricts its range to Panama, Colombia, Venezuela, and Ecuador, and possibly Peru. It has also been listed from Brazil (Rondônia).

== Description ==
Micrurus mipartitus has a cylindrical body that can reach a total length (tail included) of 140.6 cm (55.4 in). It has quite small eyes and a rounded head. The black body rings of this species can number from 34 to 84 and are separated by narrow yellow or white intermediary rings. The second ring on the head and 3 or 4 of the tail rings are red-colored in contrast to the white or yellow rings.

== Biology ==
=== Behavior ===
Micrurus mipartitus is a species of crepuscular and nocturnal habits. During periods of low rainfall, it may be located underground, several centimeters deep. In times of high rainfall, it is found on the soil surface or where leaf litter is abundant.

=== Habitat ===
The red-tailed coral snake lives in forests, from tropical dry forests to foggy forests, and is also found in human settlements in rural areas used for agriculture.

=== Diet ===
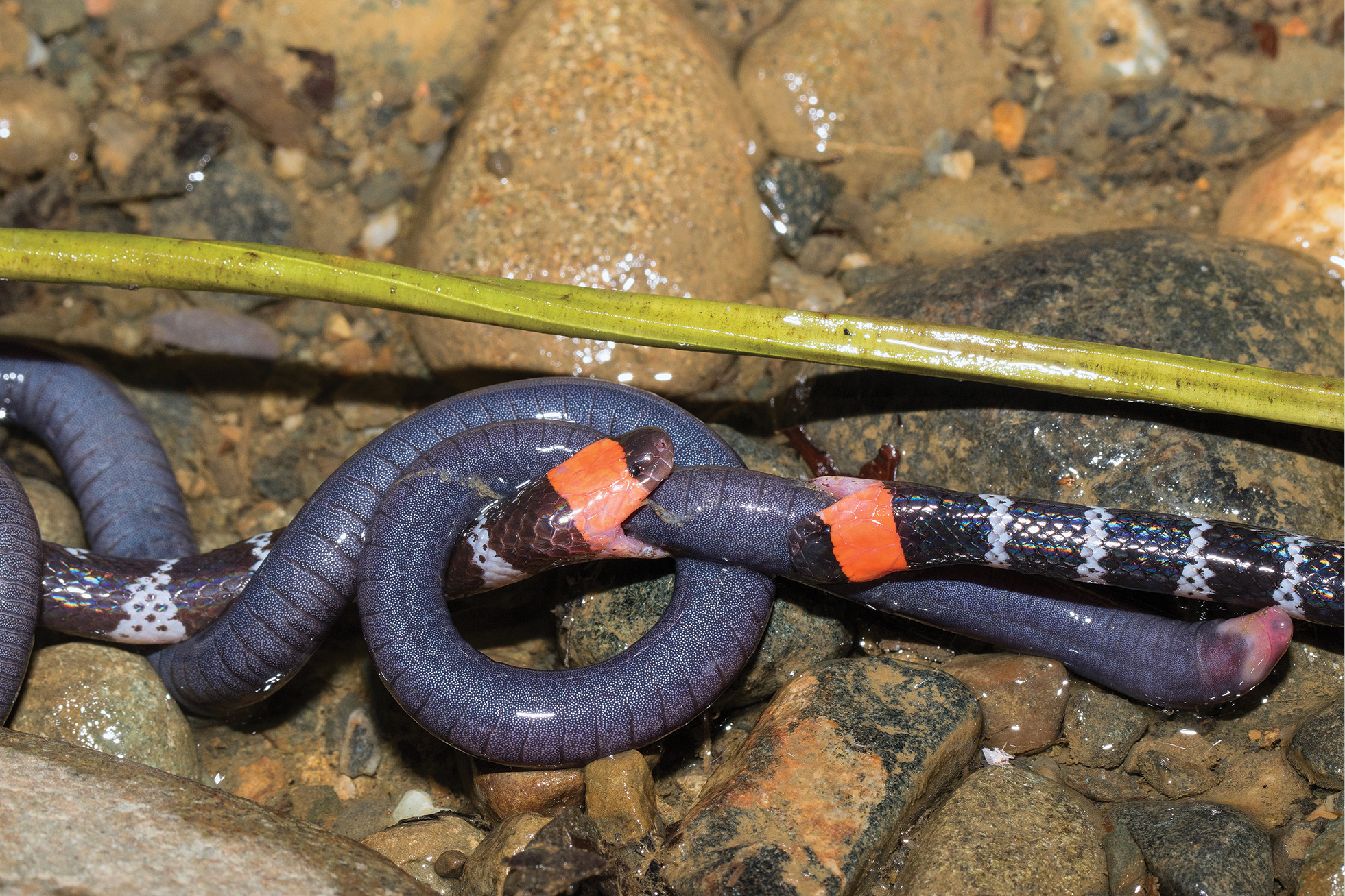
Two red-tailed coral snakes competing for a caecilian (Caecilia sp.)

The diet of M. mipartitus is mainly based on snakes (e.g., Atractus werneri, A. sanctamartae, Epictia spp., Trilepida spp.) as well as lizards (e.g., Lepidoblepharis sanctaemartae), amphisbaenids (e.g., Amphisbaena spp.), frogs, and caecilians (e.g., Caecilia guntheri).

=== Reproduction ===
The red-tailed coral snake is oviparous; about eight white-colored eggs have been recorded, which are 2.9 cm (1.1 in) long, with an average weight of 3.1 g (0.11 oz). Incubation period lasts between 73–87 days, total length of each hatchling varies from 20–21.9 cm (7.9–8.6 in) and weight is around 3.3 g (0.12 oz).

== Venom ==
The red-tailed coral snake has a potentially deadly neurotoxic venom, which produces a complete depolarizing muscle block. Proteomics analysis of the venom components found that it contains about 60% three-finger toxins, 30% phospholipase A2, and 10% other toxins. The most abundant venom component is the three-finger toxin mipartoxin-I.

The venom acts by blocking the neuromuscular transmission of nerve muscle preparations, it acts in a post-synaptic way through the Nicotinic acetylcholine receptor (nAChr), inhibiting the muscle contractions in phrenic nerve diaphragm. After the bite, local pain and paraesthesia appear in minutes, in severe cases, neurological manifestations appear in 30 minutes to 1–2 hours, such as progressive bilateral ptosis, dysarthria, progressive weakness in the muscles of the extremities, difficulties in walking, salivation, drowsiness, respiratory arrest, flaccid quadriparesis and severe flaccid quadriplegia. The LD50 for 18-20 gram mice is 9 μg and 0.45 mg / kg. The intraperitoneal lethal dose is 0.125 mg / kg and 0.06 μg / g.

The average venom yield of Micrurus mipartitus "milked" by scientists was 7 mg (dry weight), which exceeds the estimated lethal dose for an adult human of 4–6 mg.
