= C. leucocephala =

C. leucocephala may refer to:

- Caecilia leucocephala, an amphibian species found in Colombia, Ecuador and Panama
- Cladorhynchus leucocephala, a bird species in the genus Cladorhynchus
- Columba leucocephala, a synonym for Patagioenas leucocephala, the white-crowned pigeon, a bird species

== See also ==
- Leucocephala (disambiguation)
