= Caecilia marcusi =

Conservation status
- Least Concern (IUCN 3.1)

Scientific classification
- Kingdom: Animalia
- Phylum: Chordata
- Class: Amphibia
- Order: Gymnophiona
- Clade: Apoda
- Family: Caeciliidae
- Genus: Caecilia
- Species: C. marcusi

Binomial name
- Caecilia marcusi Wake, 1985

Species of amphibian

Caecilia marcusi is a species of caecilian in the family Caeciliidae. It is found in the southwestern Amazon Basin in Bolivia and Brazil; its range is likely to extend into Peru. Caecilia marcusi is similar to Caecilia mertensi and could be its synonym.

Caecilia marcusi is a subterranean species inhabiting lowland tropical rainforest at elevations below 400 m (1,300 ft). It is locally threatened by habitat loss.
