= Caecilia pressula =

Conservation status
- Data Deficient (IUCN 3.1)

Scientific classification
- Kingdom: Animalia
- Phylum: Chordata
- Class: Amphibia
- Order: Gymnophiona
- Clade: Apoda
- Family: Caeciliidae
- Genus: Caecilia
- Species: C. pressula

Binomial name
- Caecilia pressula Taylor, 1968

Species of amphibian

Caecilia pressula is a species of caecilian in the family Caeciliidae. It is found in Guyana and possibly Brazil. Its natural habitats are subtropical or tropical moist lowland forests.
