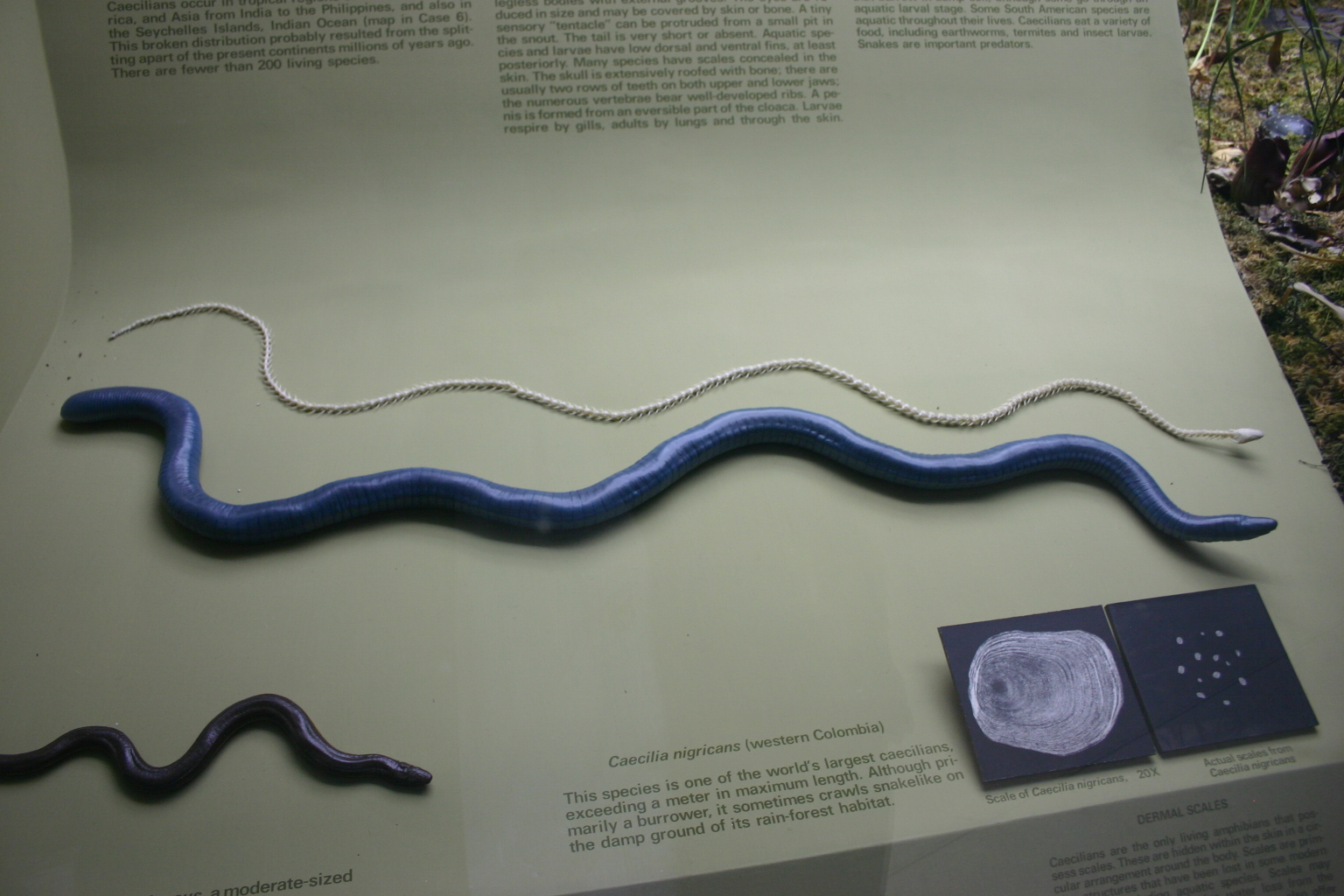

Conservation status
- Least Concern (IUCN 3.1)

Scientific classification
- Kingdom: Animalia
- Phylum: Chordata
- Class: Amphibia
- Order: Gymnophiona
- Clade: Apoda
- Family: Caeciliidae
- Genus: Caecilia
- Species: C. nigricans

Binomial name
- Caecilia nigricans Boulenger, 1902
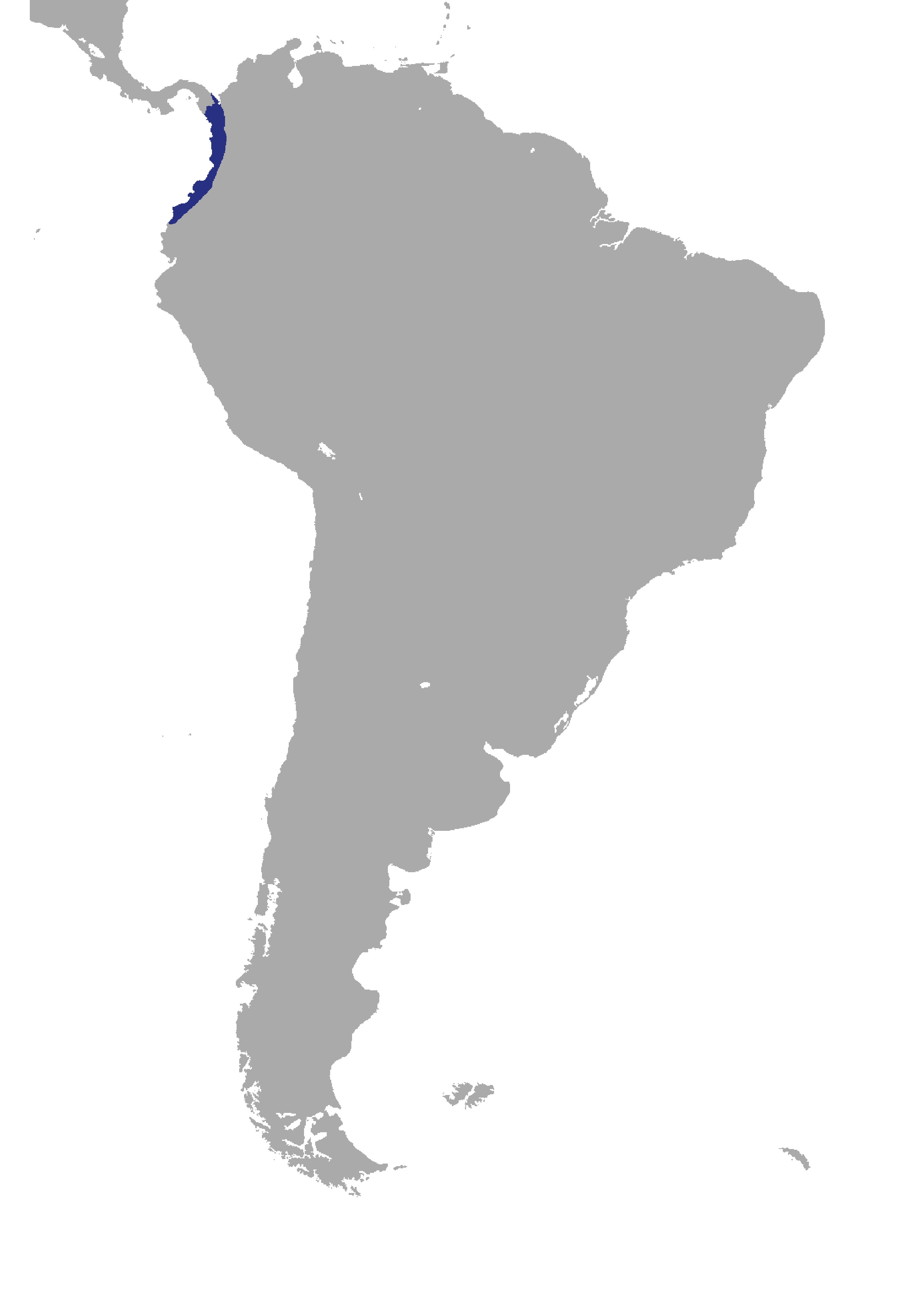

Synonyms
- Caecilia intermedia Boulenger, 1913; Caecilia palmeri Boulenger, 1913

= Caecilia nigricans =

Species of amphibian

Caecilia nigricans, commonly known as the Rio Lita caecilian, is a species of amphibian in the family Caeciliidae. It is a subterranean species located in Colombia, Ecuador, and Panama. Its natural habitats include moist, subtropical or tropical lowland forests, plantations, rural gardens, and foothill forests. The species is of least concern, as it can be found in several protected areas in Colombia like Darién National Park, however it is still threatened by human activities like deforestation.

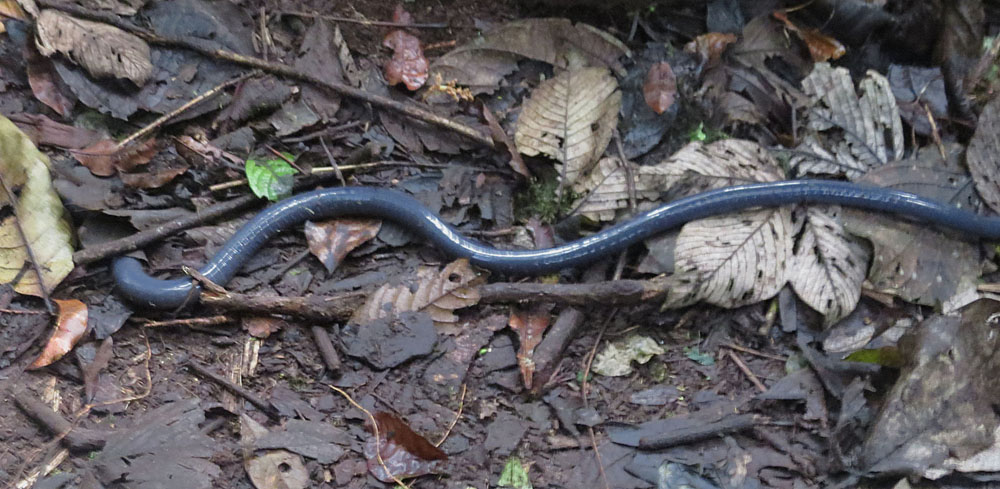
Blue, blind and defenseless, this worm-eating 'snake' is trying to burrow below the litter on Wildsumac Reserve, Ecuador.
