= Caecilia isthmica =

Conservation status
- Least Concern (IUCN 3.1)

Scientific classification
- Kingdom: Animalia
- Phylum: Chordata
- Class: Amphibia
- Order: Gymnophiona
- Clade: Apoda
- Family: Caeciliidae
- Genus: Caecilia
- Species: C. isthmica

Binomial name
- Caecilia isthmica Cope, 1877

Species of amphibian

Caecilia isthmica is a species of caecilian in the family Caeciliidae. It is found in Colombia and Panama. Its natural habitats are subtropical or tropical moist lowland forests, subtropical or tropical moist montane forests, plantations, rural gardens, and heavily degraded former forest.
