= Caecilia occidentalis =

Conservation status
- Near Threatened (IUCN 3.1)

Scientific classification
- Kingdom: Animalia
- Phylum: Chordata
- Class: Amphibia
- Order: Gymnophiona
- Clade: Apoda
- Family: Caeciliidae
- Genus: Caecilia
- Species: C. occidentalis

Binomial name
- Caecilia occidentalis Taylor, 1968

Species of amphibian

Caecilia occidentalis is a species of caecilian in the family Caeciliidae. It is endemic to the Northwestern Andean montane forests (C.Michael Hogan. 2012) within Colombia. Its habitat is subtropical or tropical moist montane forest, plantation, rural gardens, urban area, and degraded former forest.
