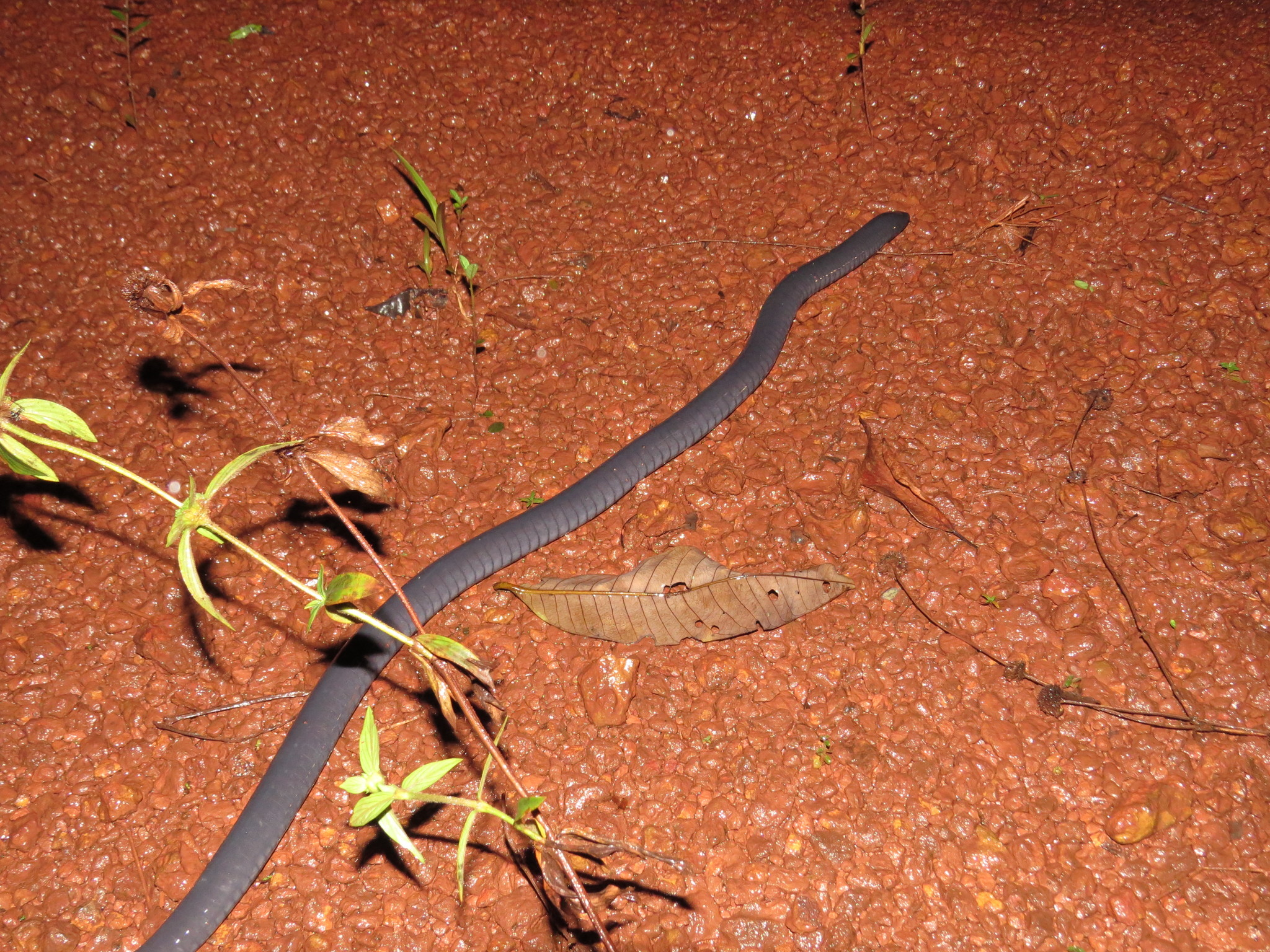

Conservation status
- Least Concern (IUCN 3.1)

Scientific classification
- Kingdom: Animalia
- Phylum: Chordata
- Class: Amphibia
- Order: Gymnophiona
- Clade: Apoda
- Family: Caeciliidae
- Genus: Caecilia
- Species: C. tentaculata

Binomial name
- Caecilia tentaculata Linnaeus, 1758

= Caecilia tentaculata =

Species of amphibian

Caecilia tentaculata is a species of caecilian (a group of serpentine amphibians) in the family Caeciliidae. It is found in Brazil, Colombia, Ecuador, French Guiana, Peru, Suriname, and Venezuela. It may be located in Bolivia and Guyana as well. It inhabits subtropical and tropical moist lowland forests, plantations, rural gardens, and deforested areas.
