= Caecilia armata =

Conservation status
- Data Deficient (IUCN 3.1)

Scientific classification
- Kingdom: Animalia
- Phylum: Chordata
- Class: Amphibia
- Order: Gymnophiona
- Clade: Apoda
- Family: Caeciliidae
- Genus: Caecilia
- Species: C. armata

Binomial name
- Caecilia armata Dunn, 1942

Species of amphibian

Caecilia armata is a species of caecilian in the family Caeciliidae. It is endemic to Brazil. Its natural habitats are subtropical or tropical moist lowland forests, plantations, rural gardens, and heavily degraded former forest.
