= Caecilia antioquiaensis =

Conservation status
- Data Deficient (IUCN 3.1)

Scientific classification
- Kingdom: Animalia
- Phylum: Chordata
- Class: Amphibia
- Order: Gymnophiona
- Clade: Apoda
- Family: Caeciliidae
- Genus: Caecilia
- Species: C. antioquiaensis

Binomial name
- Caecilia antioquiaensis Taylor, 1968
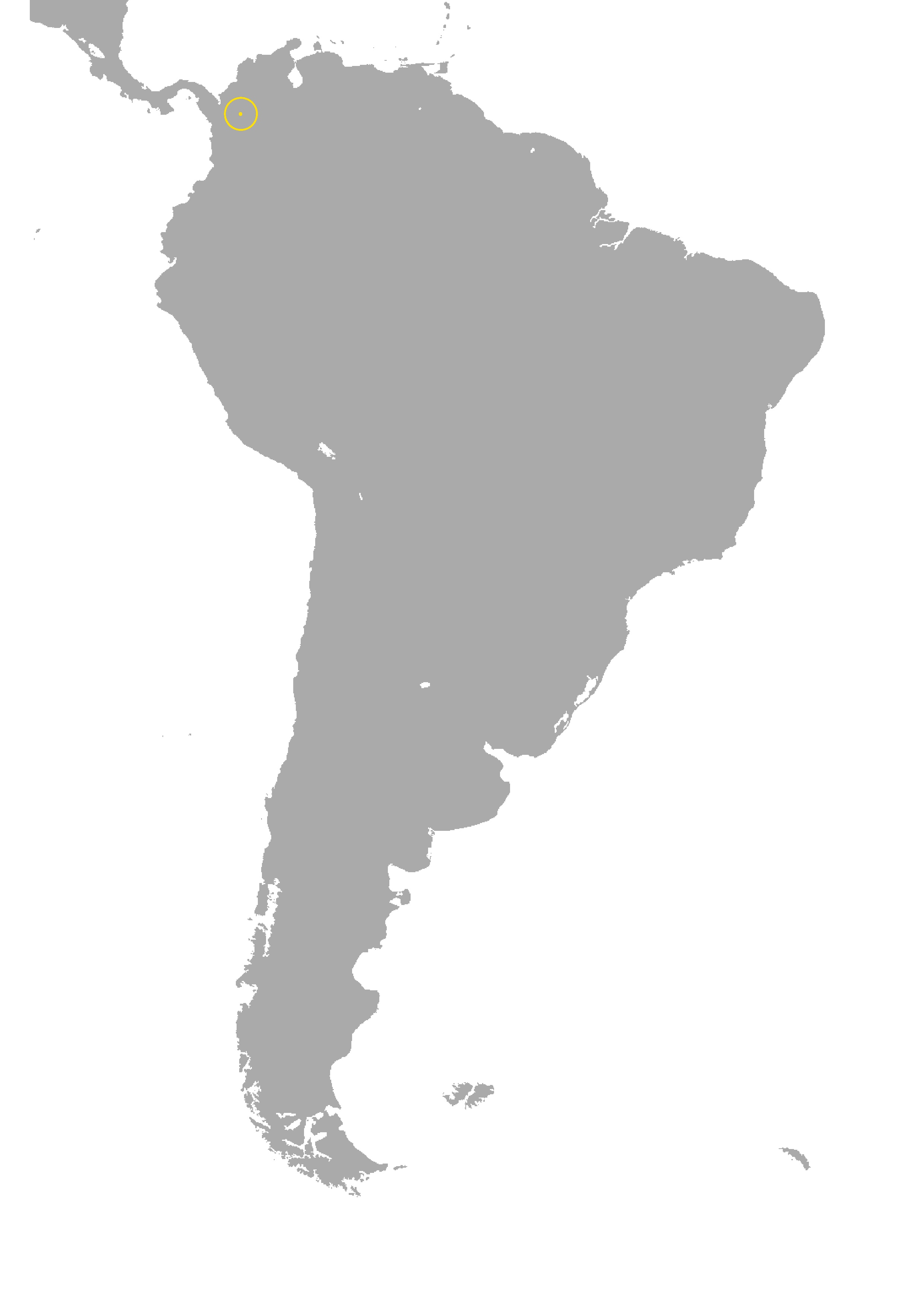

Species of amphibian

Caecilia antioquiaensis, the Antioquia caecilian, is a species of caecilian in the family Caeciliidae.

It is endemic to Colombia and only known from its type locality in the Cordillera Central in Valdivia, Antioquia.

It is a poorly known subterranean species, usually occurring in humid tropical forests.
