= Caecilia attenuata =

Conservation status
- Data Deficient (IUCN 3.1)

Scientific classification
- Kingdom: Animalia
- Phylum: Chordata
- Class: Amphibia
- Order: Gymnophiona
- Clade: Apoda
- Family: Caeciliidae
- Genus: Caecilia
- Species: C. attenuata

Binomial name
- Caecilia attenuata Taylor, 1968
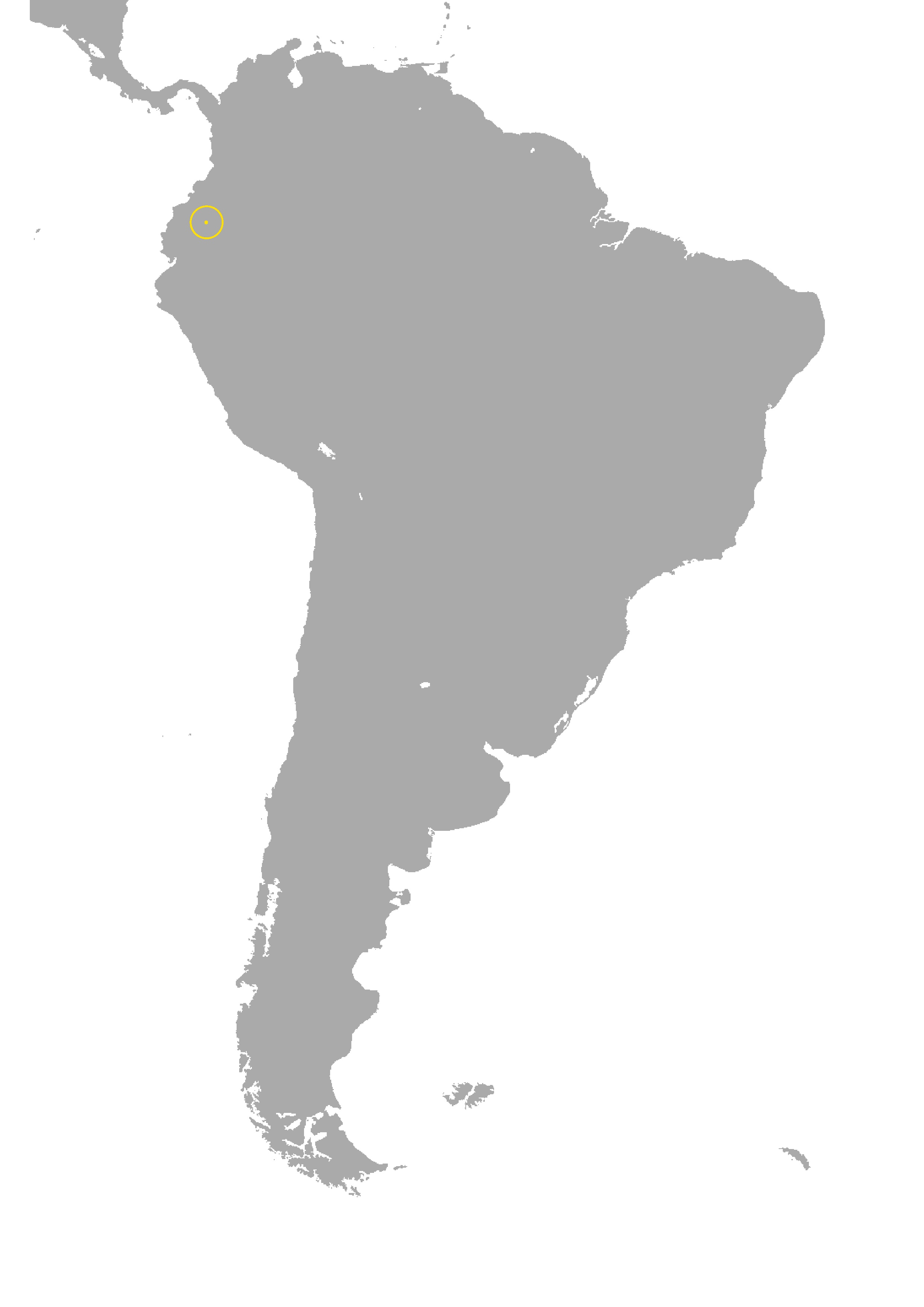

Species of amphibian

Caecilia attenuata is a species of caecilian in the family Caeciliidae. It is found in Ecuador and Peru. Its natural habitats are subtropical or tropical moist lowland forests, plantations, rural gardens, and heavily degraded former forest.
