= Caecilia pachynema =

Conservation status
- Least Concern (IUCN 3.1)

Scientific classification
- Kingdom: Animalia
- Phylum: Chordata
- Class: Amphibia
- Order: Gymnophiona
- Clade: Apoda
- Family: Caeciliidae
- Genus: Caecilia
- Species: C. pachynema

Binomial name
- Caecilia pachynema Günther, 1859

Synonyms
- Caecilia buckleyi Boulenger, 1884

Species of amphibian

Caecilia pachynema, commonly known as the Intac caecilian, is a species of amphibian in the family Caeciliidae. It is found in Colombia and Ecuador. Its natural habitats are subtropical or tropical moist montane forests and rivers. It is threatened by habitat loss.
