= Caecilia inca =

Conservation status
- Data Deficient (IUCN 3.1)

Scientific classification
- Kingdom: Animalia
- Phylum: Chordata
- Class: Amphibia
- Order: Gymnophiona
- Clade: Apoda
- Family: Caeciliidae
- Genus: Caecilia
- Species: C. inca

Binomial name
- Caecilia inca Taylor, 1973
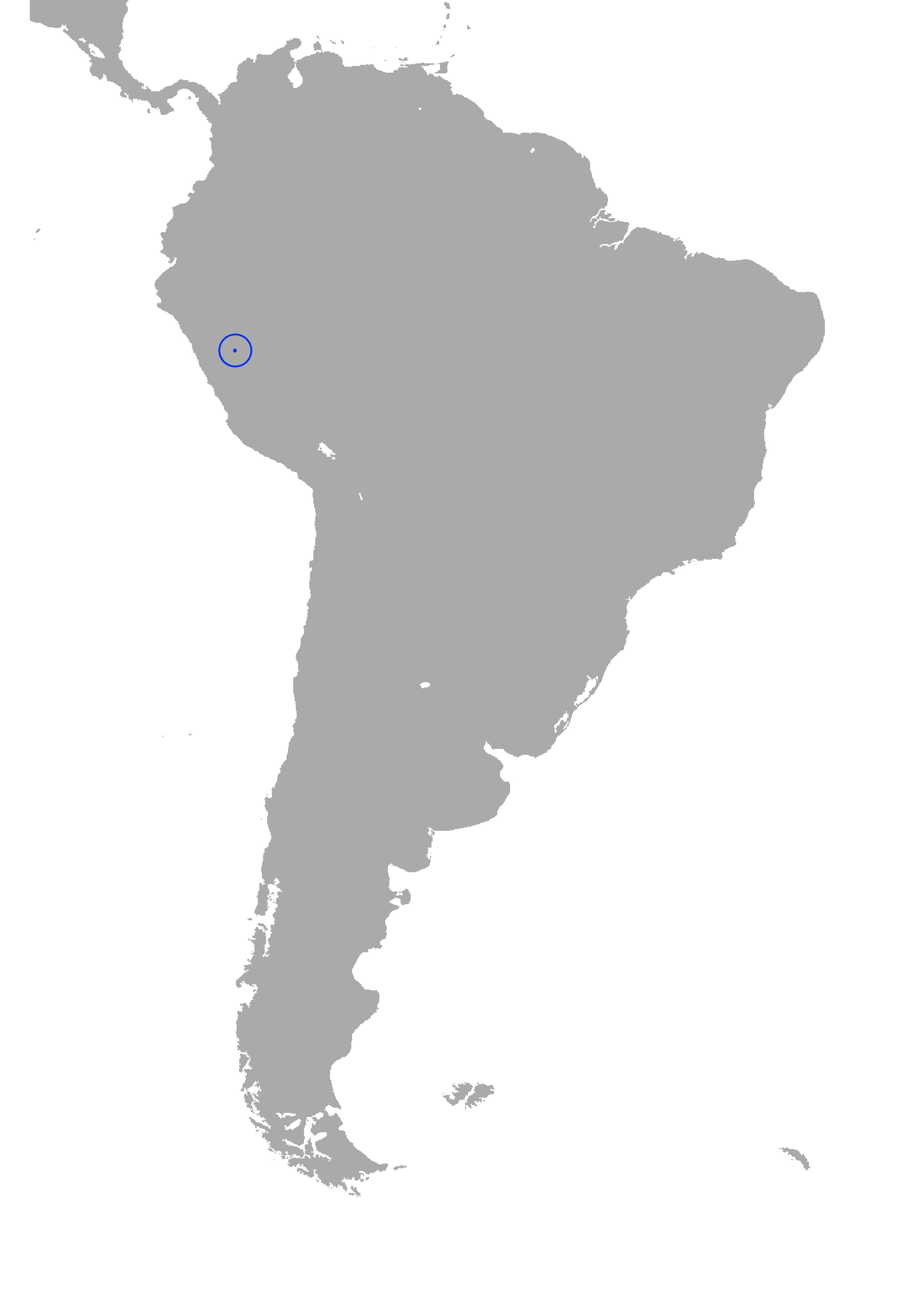

Species of amphibian

Caecilia inca is a species of caecilian in the family Caeciliidae. It is endemic to Peru and only known from the holotype collected in 1944 from "Fundo Sinchona" in the Loreto Region. There are doubts regarding taxonomic validity of this species. Common name Fundo Sinchona caecilian has been coined for it.

== Description ==
The holotype, a male, measures 107 cm (42 in) in length and has a body width of about 16 mm (0.6 in). There are 158 incomplete primary folds; secondary folds are absent. The eye is slightly visible externally. The head is somewhat narrowed towards the rounded snout tip. The nostril are small but clearly visible from above the head. There is an unsegmented terminal "shield" but no tail. The body is partly covered by scales. Coloration is grayish slate, with a hint of yellowish olive ventrolaterally.

== Habitat and conservation ==
Caecilia inca is a subterranean species inhabiting lowland moist tropical forest. The exact location of the type locality is uncertain, as is consequently its altitudinal range. The area around the type locality has probably been degraded by agricultural activities and urbanization, but there is no information of population trend of this species.
