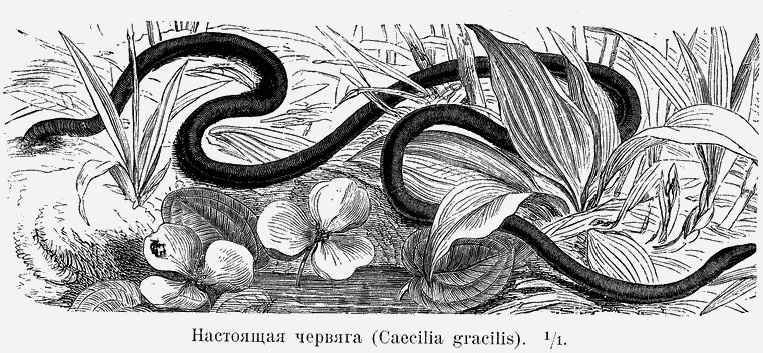

Conservation status
- Least Concern (IUCN 3.1)

Scientific classification
- Kingdom: Animalia
- Phylum: Chordata
- Class: Amphibia
- Order: Gymnophiona
- Clade: Apoda
- Family: Caeciliidae
- Genus: Caecilia
- Species: C. gracilis

Binomial name
- Caecilia gracilis Shaw, 1802
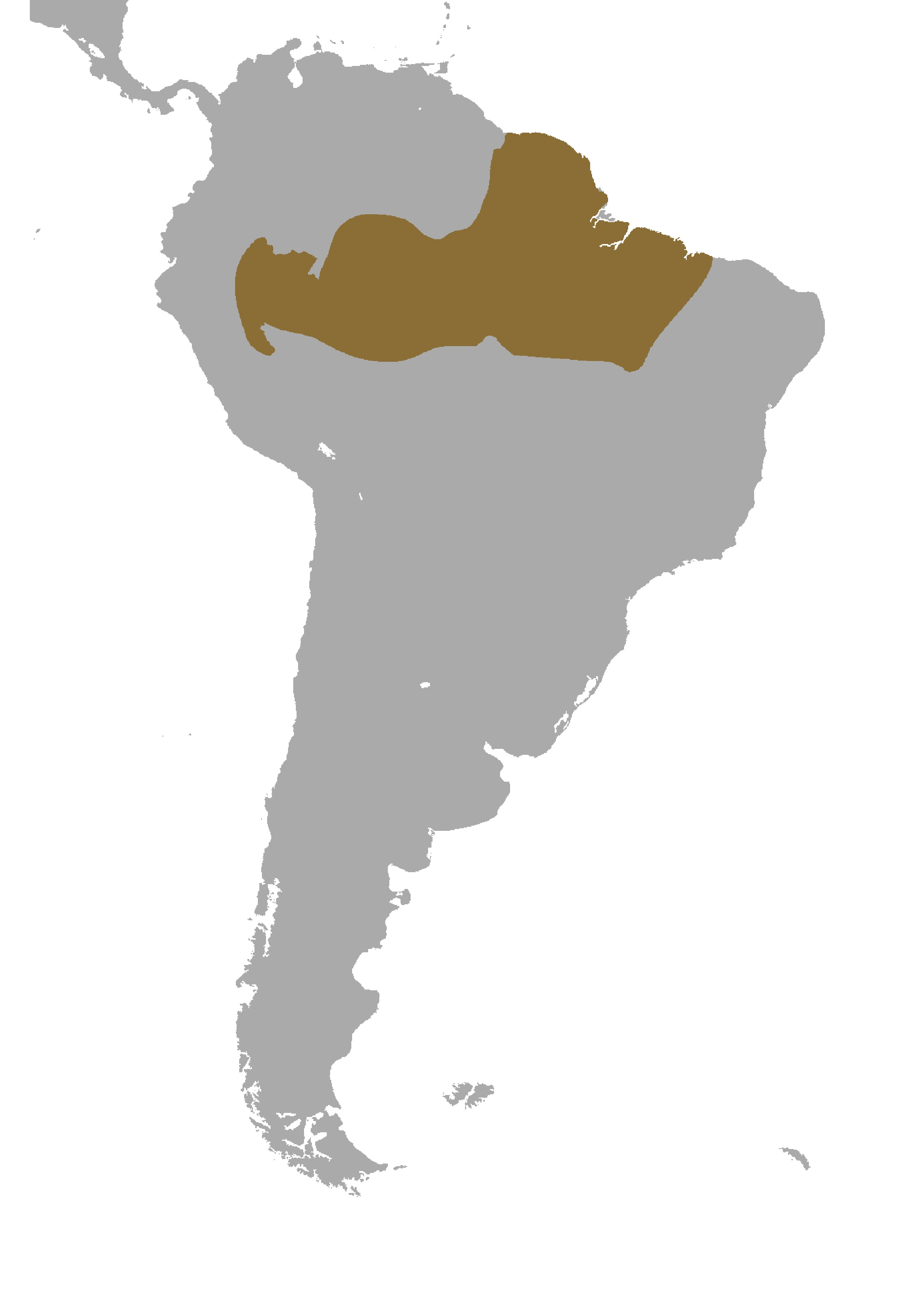

= Caecilia gracilis =

Species of amphibian

Caecilia gracilis is a species of caecilian in the family Caeciliidae. It is found in Brazil, French Guiana, Peru, Suriname, possibly Colombia, and possibly Guyana. Its natural habitats are subtropical or tropical moist lowland forests, moist savanna, plantations, rural gardens, and heavily degraded former forest.
