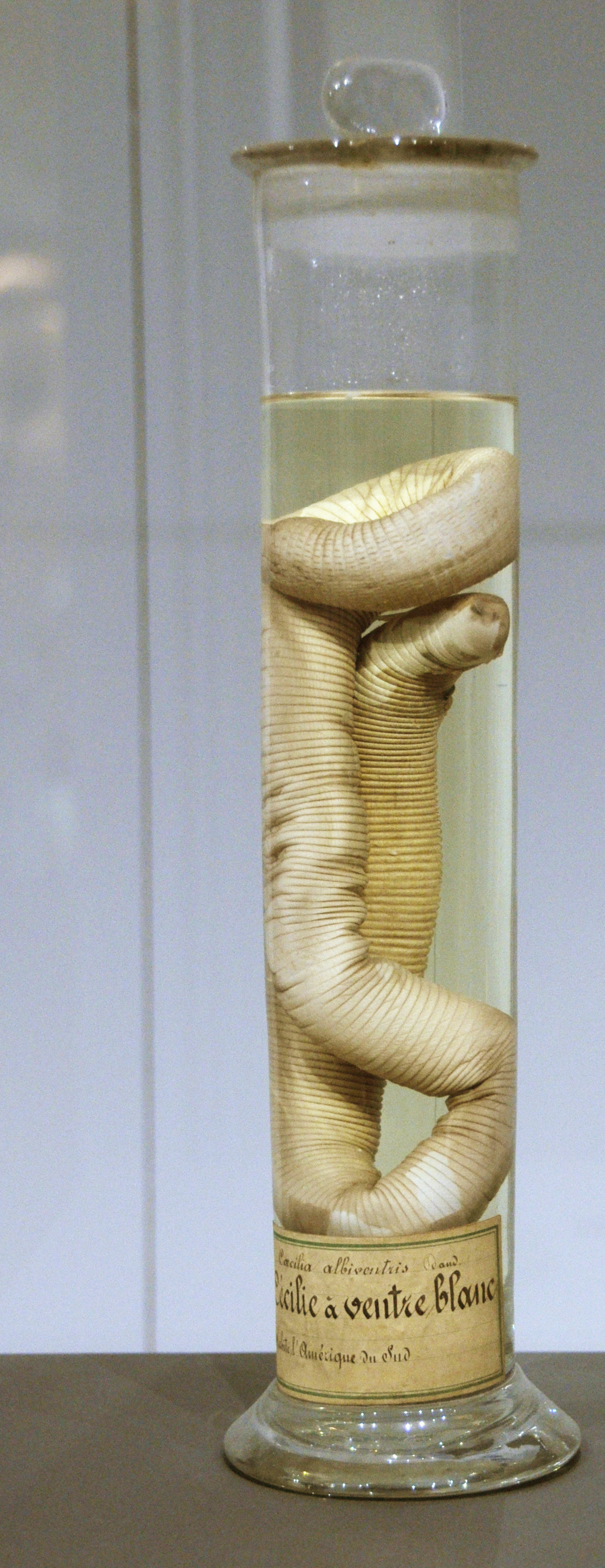

Conservation status
- Data Deficient (IUCN 3.1)

Scientific classification
- Kingdom: Animalia
- Phylum: Chordata
- Class: Amphibia
- Order: Gymnophiona
- Clade: Apoda
- Family: Caeciliidae
- Genus: Caecilia
- Species: C. albiventris

Binomial name
- Caecilia albiventris Daudin, 1803

= Caecilia albiventris =

Species of amphibian

Caecilia albiventris is a species of caecilian in the family Caeciliidae. It is endemic to Suriname. Its natural habitats are tropical moist lowland forests, plantations, rural gardens, and heavily degraded former forest.
