= Caecilia orientalis =

Conservation status
- Least Concern (IUCN 3.1)

Scientific classification
- Kingdom: Animalia
- Phylum: Chordata
- Class: Amphibia
- Order: Gymnophiona
- Clade: Apoda
- Family: Caeciliidae
- Genus: Caecilia
- Species: C. orientalis

Binomial name
- Caecilia orientalis Taylor, 1968

Species of amphibian

Caecilia orientalis is a species of caecilian in the family Caeciliidae. It is found in Colombia and Ecuador. Its natural habitats are subtropical or tropical moist lowland forests, subtropical or tropical moist montane forests, rivers, freshwater marshes, intermittent freshwater marshes, pastureland, rural gardens, and heavily degraded former forest.
