= Caecilia thompsoni =

Conservation status
- Least Concern (IUCN 3.1)

Scientific classification
- Kingdom: Animalia
- Phylum: Chordata
- Class: Amphibia
- Order: Gymnophiona
- Clade: Apoda
- Family: Caeciliidae
- Genus: Caecilia
- Species: C. thompsoni

Binomial name
- Caecilia thompsoni Boulenger, 1902

Species of amphibian

Caecilia thompsoni, commonly called Thompson's caecilian, is a species of caecilian in the family Caeciliidae. It is endemic to Colombia. It is the largest of the worm-like caecilians and reaches a length of 1.5 m (5 ft) and can weigh up to about 1 kg (2.2 lb). The longest recorded specimen measured 1.767 m (5.797 ft). Its natural habitats are subtropical or tropical moist lowland forest, subtropical or tropical moist montane forest, plantations, rural gardens, and heavily degraded former forest.
