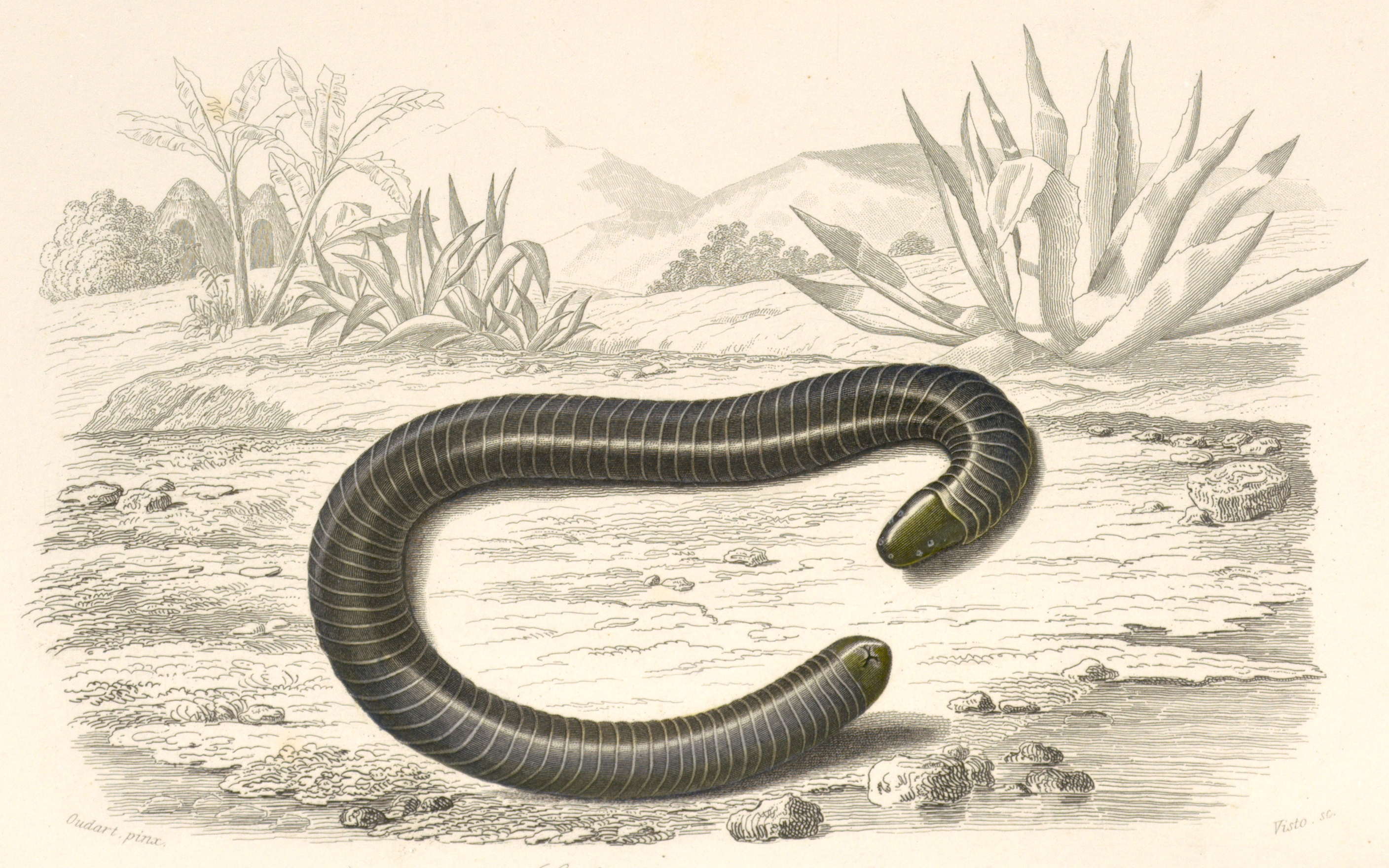
- Siphonops annulatus

Scientific classification
- Kingdom: Animalia
- Phylum: Chordata
- Class: Amphibia
- Order: Gymnophiona
- Clade: Apoda
- Family: Caeciliidae; Rafinesque, 1814

Genera
- Caecilia; Oscaecilia † Apodops

= Caeciliidae =

Family of amphibians

Caeciliidae is the family of common caecilians. They are found in Central and South America. Like other caecilians, they superficially resemble worms or snakes.

Although they are the most diverse of the caecilian families, the caeciliids do have a number of features in common that distinguish them from other caecilians. In particular, their skulls have relatively few bones, with those that are present being fused to form a solid ram to aid in burrowing through the soil. The mouth is recessed beneath the snout, and there is no tail.

Many caeciliids lay their eggs in moist soil. The eggs then hatch into aquatic larvae, which live in seepages in the soil, or in small streams. However, some species lack a larval stage, with the eggs hatching into juveniles with the same form as the adults, or else lack eggs and give birth to live young.

== Phylogeny ==
Traditional taxonomy, which is reflected in the "Scientific Classification" box in this article, categorizes extant amphibia into three orders: Anura (frogs and toads), Caudata (newts and salamanders), and Gymnophiona (caecilians). However, there is considerable debate among paleontologists and molecular geneticists concerning the phylogenetic relationship between amphibians, and indeed whether Amphibia is a monophyletic clade or a polyphyletic collection of diverse evolutionary lineages.

The more limited debate (operating on the assumption that Amphibia is a monophyletic clade) is whether Caudata is more closely related to Anura (in a shared clade called Batrachia — the traditional view) or to Gymnophiona (suggested by research in 2005). The broader debate is whether Amphibia is monophyletic or polyphyletic. The latter view considers Caudata and Gymnophiona to be more closely related to amniotes (reptiles, mammals and birds) than to Anura.

== Species ==
- Genus Caecilia – common caecilians
  - Caecilia abitaguae
  - Caecilia albiventris
  - Caecilia antioquiaensis
  - Caecilia aprix
  - Caecilia armata
  - Caecilia atelolepis
  - Caecilia attenuata
  - Caecilia bokermanni
  - Caecilia caribea
  - Caecilia corpulenta
  - Caecilia crassisquama
  - Caecilia degenerata
  - Caecilia disossea
  - Caecilia dunni
  - Caecilia epicrionopsoides
  - Caecilia flavopunctata
  - Caecilia goweri
  - Caecilia gracilis
  - Caecilia guntheri
  - Caecilia inca
  - Caecilia isthmica
  - Caecilia leucocephala
  - Caecilia macrodonta
  - Caecilia marcusi
  - Caecilia mertensi
  - Caecilia museugoeldi
  - Caecilia nigricans
  - Caecilia occidentalis
  - Caecilia orientalis
  - Caecilia pachynema
  - Caecilia perdita
  - Caecilia pressula
  - Caecilia pulchraserrana
  - Caecilia subdermalis
  - Caecilia subnigricans
  - Caecilia subterminalis
  - Caecilia tentaculata
  - Caecilia tenuissima
  - Caecilia thompsoni
  - Caecilia volcani
- Genus Oscaecilia – South American caecilians
  - Oscaecilia bassleri
  - Oscaecilia elongata
  - Oscaecilia equatorialis
  - Oscaecilia hypereumeces
  - Oscaecilia koepckeorum
  - Oscaecilia ochrocephala
  - Oscaecilia osae
  - Oscaecilia polyzona
  - Oscaecilia zweifeli
