= Caecilia crassisquama =

Conservation status
- Data Deficient (IUCN 3.1)

Scientific classification
- Kingdom: Animalia
- Phylum: Chordata
- Class: Amphibia
- Order: Gymnophiona
- Clade: Apoda
- Family: Caeciliidae
- Genus: Caecilia
- Species: C. crassisquama

Binomial name
- Caecilia crassisquama Taylor, 1968

Species of amphibian

Caecilia crassisquama is a species of caecilian in the family Caeciliidae. It is endemic to Ecuador and only known from the holotype collected in "Normandia, Zuñía, Río Upana", now in the Sangay National Park. It is a subterranean species that was collected in montane forest.
