= Caecilia degenerata =

Conservation status
- Data Deficient (IUCN 3.1)

Scientific classification
- Kingdom: Animalia
- Phylum: Chordata
- Class: Amphibia
- Order: Gymnophiona
- Clade: Apoda
- Family: Caeciliidae
- Genus: Caecilia
- Species: C. degenerata

Binomial name
- Caecilia degenerata Dunn, 1942

Species of amphibian

Caecilia degenerata, the Garagoa caecilian, is a species of caecilian in the family Caeciliidae. It is endemic to Colombia and known from the Cordillera Oriental in Boyacá, Santander, and Cundinamarca Departments. Its natural habitats are montane forests. This subterranean species is apparently common in parts of its range. Deforestation might be a threat to it.
