= Caecilia flavopunctata =

Conservation status
- Data Deficient (IUCN 3.1)

Scientific classification
- Kingdom: Animalia
- Phylum: Chordata
- Class: Amphibia
- Order: Gymnophiona
- Clade: Apoda
- Family: Caeciliidae
- Genus: Caecilia
- Species: C. flavopunctata

Binomial name
- Caecilia flavopunctata Roze & Solano, 1963

Species of amphibian

Caecilia flavopunctata is a species of caecilian in the family Caeciliidae. It is endemic to Venezuela. Its natural habitats are subtropical or tropical moist lowland forests, plantations, rural gardens, and heavily degraded former forest.
