= Caecilia subterminalis =

Conservation status
- Data Deficient (IUCN 3.1)

Scientific classification
- Kingdom: Animalia
- Phylum: Chordata
- Class: Amphibia
- Order: Gymnophiona
- Clade: Apoda
- Family: Caeciliidae
- Genus: Caecilia
- Species: C. subterminalis

Binomial name
- Caecilia subterminalis Taylor, 1968

Species of amphibian

Caecilia subterminalis is a species of caecilian in the family Caeciliidae. It is endemic to Ecuador.
