= Caecilia bokermanni =

Conservation status
- Least Concern (IUCN 3.1)

Scientific classification
- Kingdom: Animalia
- Phylum: Chordata
- Class: Amphibia
- Order: Gymnophiona
- Clade: Apoda
- Family: Caeciliidae
- Genus: Caecilia
- Species: C. bokermanni

Binomial name
- Caecilia bokermanni Taylor, 1968
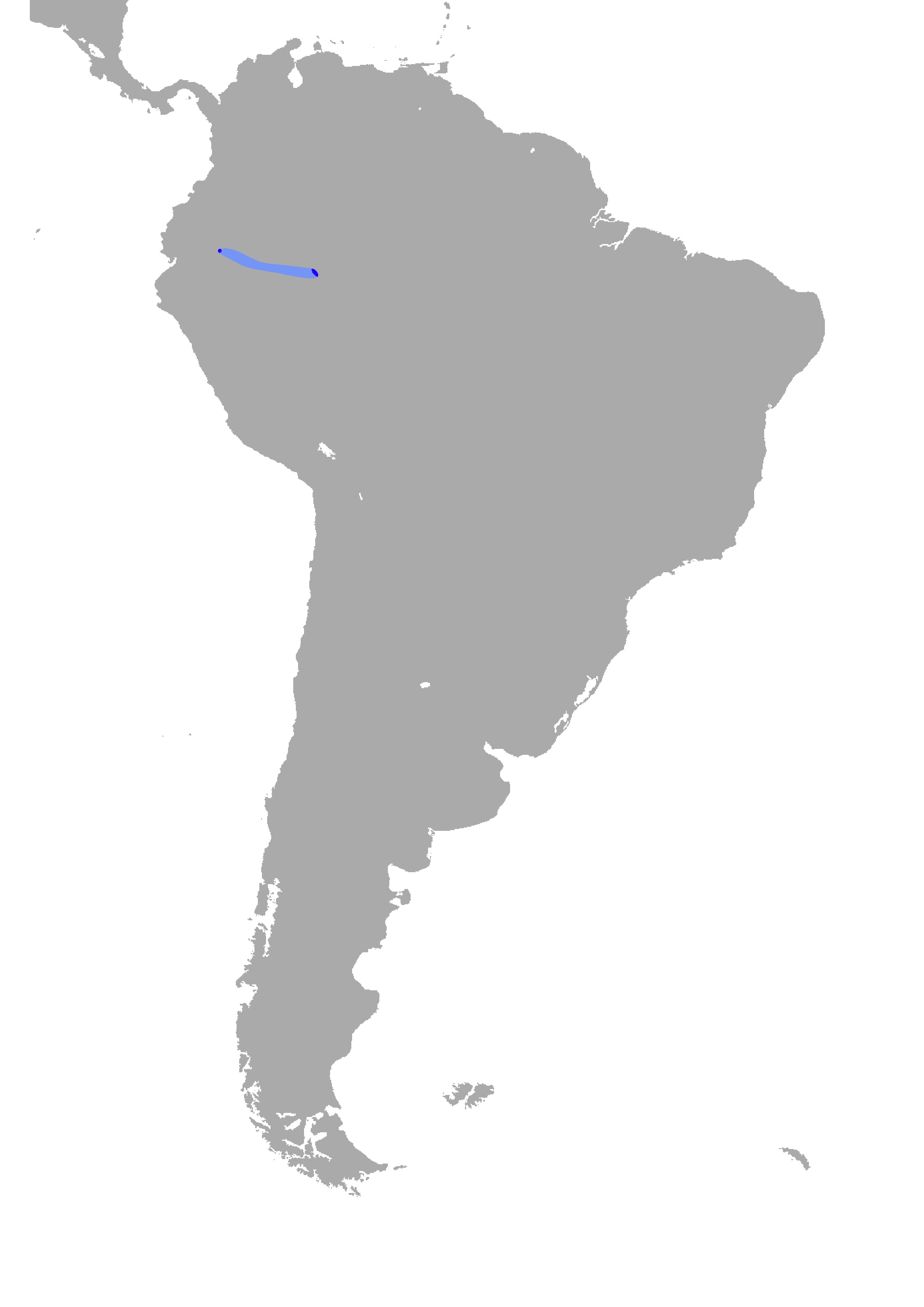
- Dark blue: extant, Light blue: possibly extant

Species of amphibian

Caecilia bokermanni is a species of caecilian in the family Caeciliidae. It is found in Colombia, Ecuador, and possibly Peru. Its natural habitat is subtropical or tropical moist lowland forests.
