= Caecilia disossea =

Conservation status
- Least Concern (IUCN 3.1)

Scientific classification
- Kingdom: Animalia
- Phylum: Chordata
- Class: Amphibia
- Order: Gymnophiona
- Clade: Apoda
- Family: Caeciliidae
- Genus: Caecilia
- Species: C. disossea

Binomial name
- Caecilia disossea Taylor, 1968

Species of amphibian

Caecilia disossea is a species of caecilian in the family Caeciliidae.

== Distribution ==
It is found in Ecuador and Peru.

== Habitation ==
Its natural habitats are subtropical or tropical moist lowland forests, plantations, rural gardens, and heavily degraded former forest.
