= Caecilia subdermalis =

Conservation status
- Least Concern (IUCN 3.1)

Scientific classification
- Kingdom: Animalia
- Phylum: Chordata
- Class: Amphibia
- Order: Gymnophiona
- Clade: Apoda
- Family: Caeciliidae
- Genus: Caecilia
- Species: C. subdermalis

Binomial name
- Caecilia subdermalis Taylor, 1968

Species of amphibian

Caecilia subdermalis is a species of caecilian in the family Caeciliidae. It is endemic to Colombia. Its natural habitats are subtropical or tropical moist montane forests, pastureland, plantations, rural gardens, and heavily degraded former forest.
