= Mipartoxin-I =

Neurotoxin

Mipartoxin-I is a neurotoxin produced by Micrurus mipartitus, a venomous coral snake distributed in Central and South America. This toxin causes a neuromuscular blockade by blocking the nicotinic acetylcholine receptor. It is the most abundant component in the venom.

== Sources ==
The toxin is produced by the Micrurus mipartitus, also known as the ‘redtail coral snake’, ‘rabo de ají’, or ‘gargantilla’. The snake populates Nicaragua, Costa Rica, isthmus of Panama, Ecuador, Colombia, Venezuela and Brazil.

== Chemistry ==
=== Structure and family ===
Mipartoxin-I is a short-chain, type-I, α-neurotoxin composed of 60 amino acids with a molecular mass of 7030 Da. It is a member of the three finger toxin (3FTx) superfamily, and it contains the characteristic eight cysteines of this superfamily.

=== Homology ===
CTX A5, a cardiotoxin from the cobra Naja atra, shows similarities with mipartoxin-I in the predicted core region and in amino acid sequence identity (38%). However, there are some slight differences in loop 1 and 2, and major differences in loop 3. Mipartoxin-I generally shows relatively low sequence similarity with other 3FTx family members.

== Target ==
Mipartoxin-I is proposed to bind antagonistically to the nicotinic acetylcholine receptors and consequently inhibit the activity of this receptor without damaging the muscle fibres. The toxin blocks the muscle contractions without interfering with presynaptic acetylcholine release, indicating that it acts post-synaptically.

== Toxicity ==
Envenoming mice with Mipartoxin-I causes bilateral ptosis and progressive respiratory paralysis. Following a decrease in activity and respiratory paralysis, mice die a few hours after envenoming. The LD50 of mipartoxin-I is 0.06 μg/g body weight.

== Treatment ==
Currently, no specific antivenom is available in most of its important geographic field (Central America). The scarcity of an antivenom is complicated by insufficient cross-protection by antivenoms that are more accessible in this geographic area. However, the similarity in amino acid sequence of related toxins of two South American coral snakes were high (M. frontalis 70% and M. altirostris 68%). This indicates a possible cross-protection of these two antivenoms for mipartoxin-I.
