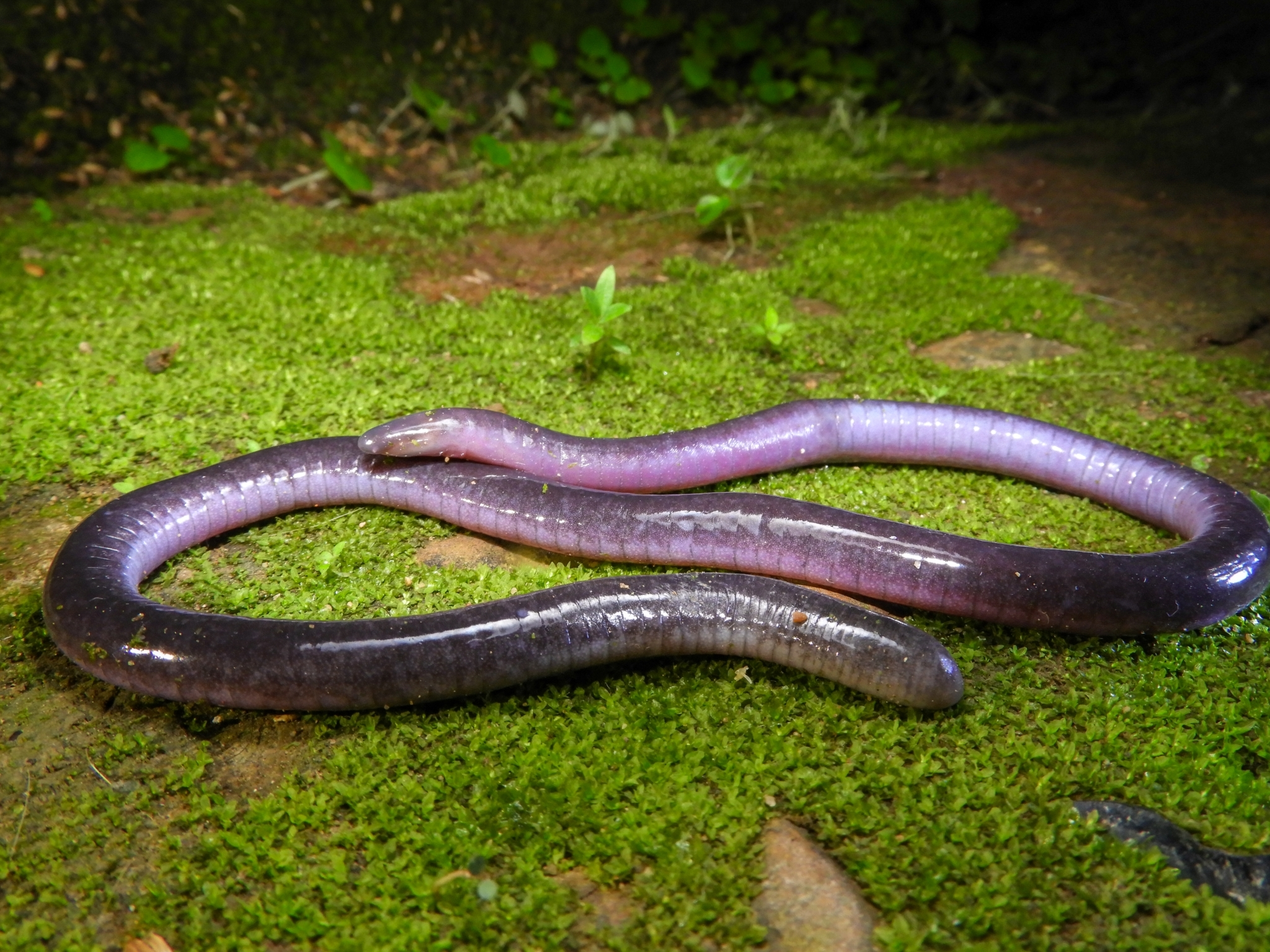

Conservation status
- Least Concern (IUCN 3.1)

Scientific classification
- Kingdom: Animalia
- Phylum: Chordata
- Class: Amphibia
- Order: Gymnophiona
- Clade: Apoda
- Family: Caeciliidae
- Genus: Caecilia
- Species: C. subnigricans

Binomial name
- Caecilia subnigricans Dunn, 1942
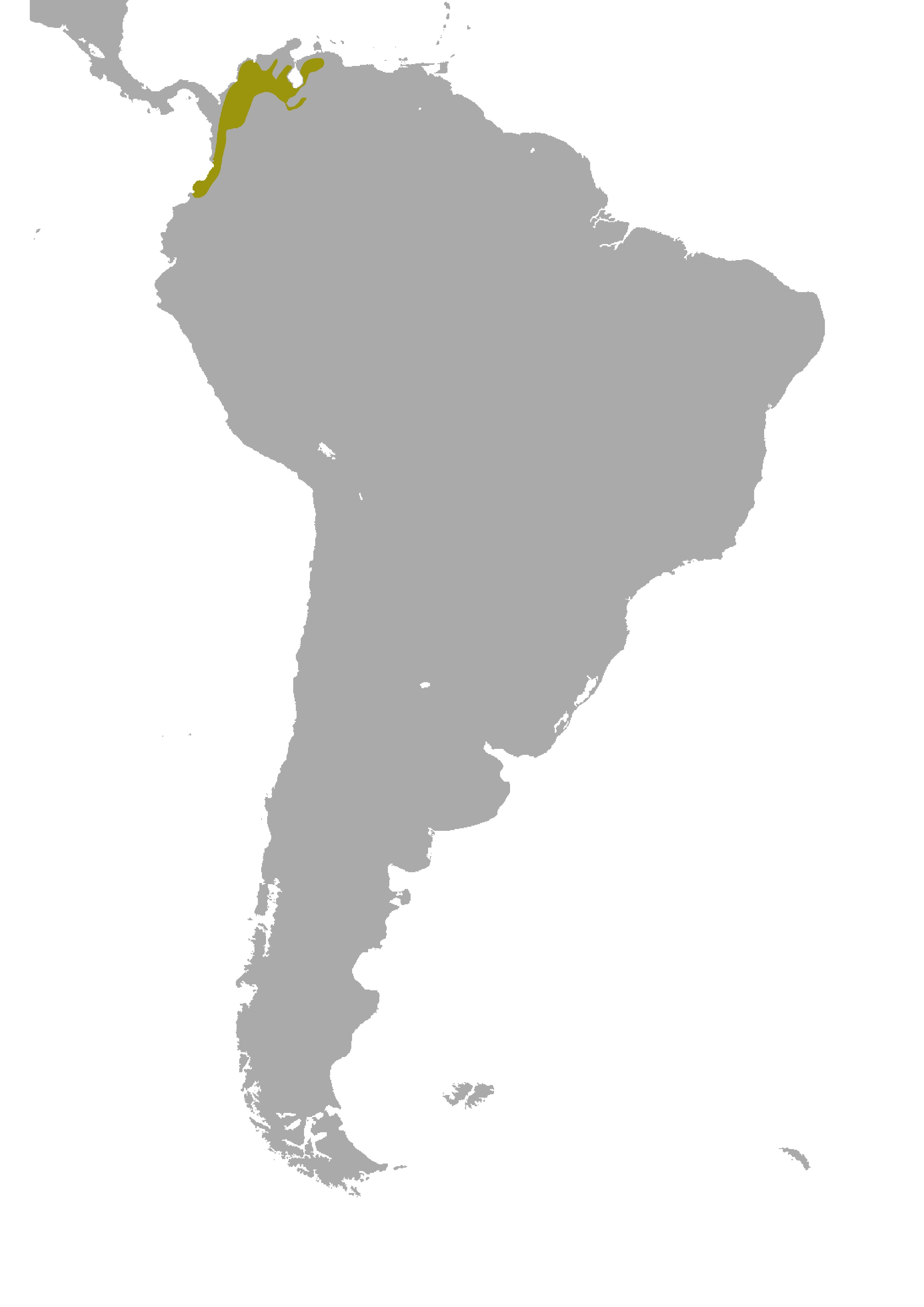

= Caecilia subnigricans =

Species of amphibian

Caecilia subnigricans is a species of caecilian in the family Caeciliidae. It is found in Colombia and Venezuela. Its natural habitats are subtropical or tropical dry forests, subtropical or tropical moist lowland forests, plantations, rural gardens, and heavily degraded former forest.
