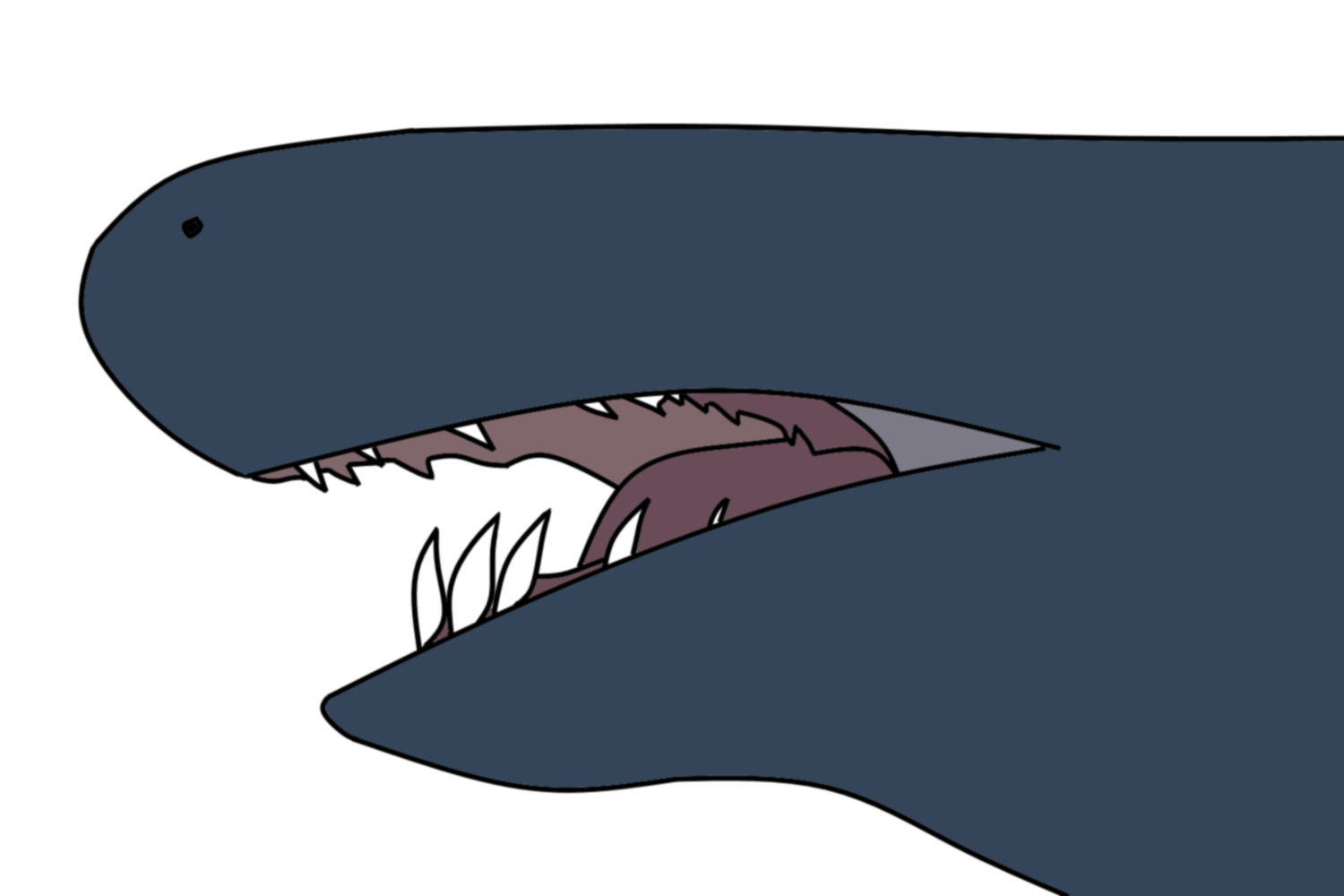

Conservation status
- Endangered (IUCN 3.1)

Scientific classification
- Kingdom: Animalia
- Phylum: Chordata
- Class: Amphibia
- Order: Gymnophiona
- Clade: Apoda
- Family: Caeciliidae
- Genus: Caecilia
- Species: C. abitaguae

Binomial name
- Caecilia abitaguae Dunn, 1942

= Caecilia abitaguae =

Species of amphibian

Caecilia abitaguae is a species of caecilian in the family Caeciliidae. It is endemic to Ecuador. Its natural habitats are subtropical or tropical moist montane forests, plantations, rural gardens, and heavily degraded former forest. It is threatened by habitat loss.

Two individuals of Caecilia abutaguae were observed during collection to exhibit possible intraspecific aggression. One individual was found actively biting the mid-body of the other, resulting in visible bleeding at the bite mark. Such aggressive interactions are rare in caecilian reports and may indicate social, territorial, or stress-induced behavior that had previously gone undocumented.
