= Caecilia corpulenta =

Conservation status
- Data Deficient (IUCN 3.1)

Scientific classification
- Kingdom: Animalia
- Phylum: Chordata
- Class: Amphibia
- Order: Gymnophiona
- Clade: Apoda
- Family: Caeciliidae
- Genus: Caecilia
- Species: C. corpulenta

Binomial name
- Caecilia corpulenta Taylor, 1968

Species of amphibian

Caecilia corpulenta is a species of caecilian in the family Caeciliidae. It is endemic to Colombia. Its natural habitats are subtropical or tropical moist montane forests, swamps, plantations, rural gardens, and heavily degraded former forest.
