= Caecilia dunni =

Conservation status
- Data Deficient (IUCN 3.1)

Scientific classification
- Kingdom: Animalia
- Phylum: Chordata
- Class: Amphibia
- Order: Gymnophiona
- Clade: Apoda
- Family: Caeciliidae
- Genus: Caecilia
- Species: C. dunni

Binomial name
- Caecilia dunni Hershkovitz, 1938

Synonyms
- Caecilia intermedia Boulenger, 1913 — tentative

Species of amphibian

Caecilia dunni is a species of caecilian in the family Caeciliidae. It is endemic to Ecuador and known from the Amazon basin in Napo and Pastaza Provinces. The specific name dunni honors Emmett Reid Dunn, a prominent American herpetologist. Common name Dunn's caecilian has been coined for it.

Caecilia dunni live subterraneanously in submontane forests. Deforestation is a potential threat to this little known species.
