= Leucocephala =

Leucocephala, a Latin word meaning white-headed, may refer to:

- 8971 Leucocephala, a Main-belt asteroid discovered on September 29, 1973

== Species Latin names ==
- W. leucocephala
  - Wigandia leucocephala, a flowering plant species in the genus Wigandia

== Subspecies ==
- Lomandra leucocephala subsp. leucocephala, a subspecies in the species Lomandra leucocephala, a plant in the genus Lomandra found in New South Wales, Australia

== See also ==
- Leucocephalum
- Leucocephalus
