= Caecilia leucocephala =

Conservation status
- Least Concern (IUCN 3.1)

Scientific classification
- Kingdom: Animalia
- Phylum: Chordata
- Class: Amphibia
- Order: Gymnophiona
- Clade: Apoda
- Family: Caeciliidae
- Genus: Caecilia
- Species: C. leucocephala

Binomial name
- Caecilia leucocephala Taylor, 1968

Species of amphibian

Caecilia leucocephala is a species of caecilian in the family Caeciliidae. It is found in Colombia, Ecuador, and Panama. Its natural habitats are subtropical or tropical moist lowland forests, plantations, rural gardens, and heavily degraded former forest.
