= Caecilia volcani =

Conservation status
- Least Concern (IUCN 3.1)

Scientific classification
- Kingdom: Animalia
- Phylum: Chordata
- Class: Amphibia
- Order: Gymnophiona
- Clade: Apoda
- Family: Caeciliidae
- Genus: Caecilia
- Species: C. volcani

Binomial name
- Caecilia volcani Taylor, 1969

Species of amphibian

Caecilia volcani, known commonly as the Cocle Caecilian, is a species of caecilian in the family Caeciliidae. It is endemic to Central America, having only been found in Panama and Costa Rica.

== Taxonomy ==
The first description of Caecilia volcani was published by Edward Harrison Taylor in 1969. The holotype, a female, was collected by Taylor and his field partner Charles Myers in July 1966, with the type locality being El Valle de Antón, Coclé , Panama, at an elevation of about 550 m (1,800 ft). The name volcani is derived from Volcanus. According to herpetologist Adam P. Summers, the name is likely in reference to the volcanic origin of the highlands the type locality is located in.

== Description ==
C. volcani is known to reach total lengths of up to 324 mm (12.8 in), with the body width being one 30–37th of the total length. It has a flat snout, eyes that are visible under the skin and splenial teeth. It has 112–124 primary annular folds and 14–37 secondary ones. Its colouration is for the most part uniformly slate grey, being a bit lighter on the head and neck, and even lighter than that on the lips and underside of the snout. The remainder of the snout is light tan. Annual folds are a darker grey than the rest of the body.

== Distribution and habitat ==
C. volcani was thought to be endemic to Panama, but has since been found in Costa Rica, in an area to the northeast of San José. Its range in Costa Rica is considered likely to be more extensive than currently known.

It is a subterranean species, but in its natural habitat it can also found under leaf-litter in tropical forests. In addition to this, it has been found a wide variety of other habitats, including mature secondary forest and ones highly disturbed by human activity, such as rural gardens and pastures. It has also been found at a swimming pool.

The 2019 assessment of the species for the IUCN Red List categorized it as a least-concern species.
