= Caecilia guntheri =

Conservation status
- Least Concern (IUCN 3.1)

Scientific classification
- Kingdom: Animalia
- Phylum: Chordata
- Class: Amphibia
- Order: Gymnophiona
- Clade: Apoda
- Family: Caeciliidae
- Genus: Caecilia
- Species: C. guntheri

Binomial name
- Caecilia guntheri Dunn, 1942

Species of amphibian

Günther's caecilian (Caecilia guntheri) is a species of caecilian in the family Caeciliidae. It is found in Colombia and Ecuador. Its natural habitat is subtropical or tropical moist montane forests.

== History and Taxonomy ==
The name Caecilia guntheri was used in 1880 by Peters as a nomen nudum. It was described as a species in 1942 by the American herpetologist Emmett Reid Dunn based on a holotype specimen collected from Western Ecuador.

== Morphology ==
C. guntheri is dark purple in color with a light grey underbelly and a slightly truncated or shovel-shaped head. It was previously distinguished from sympatric caecilian species by the number of annular folds along its body, which correspond in number with the animal's vertebrae; C. guntheri has 108-132 primary folds and 7-28 secondary folds Recent descriptions of new species of South American caecilia with overlapping fold ranges have cast doubt on this method as a means of distinguishing C. guntheri from other species.

== Habitat ==
C. guntheri inhabits the slopes of the Andes Mountains in Ecuador and Colombia. It has also been identified in the Pinogana District of Panama.
