= El Carmen de Chucurí =

Coordinates: 6.69806°N 73.5111°W

- Municipality and town
- Flag Coat of arms

- Location of the municipality and town of El Carmen, Santander in the Santander Department of Colombia.
- Country: Colombia
- Department: Santander Department

Population (Census 2018)
  - Total: 17,638
- Time zone: UTC-5 (Colombia Standard Time)

El Carmen de Chucurí is a town and municipality in the Santander Department in northeastern Colombia.

== Climate ==
El Carmen de Chucurí has a tropical climate, with warm temperatures and significant rainfall throughout the year.

Climate data for El Carmen de Chucurí, elevation 815 m (2,674 ft) (1981–2010)
Month	Jan	Feb	Mar	Apr	May	Jun	Jul	Aug	Sep	Oct	Nov	Dec	Year
Mean daily maximum °C (°F)	27.6 (81.7)	27.9 (82.2)	27.7 (81.9)	27.6 (81.7)	27.8 (82.0)	27.8 (82.0)	28.1 (82.6)	28.0 (82.4)	27.7 (81.9)	27.3 (81.1)	27.0 (80.6)	27.1 (80.8)	27.6 (81.7)
Daily mean °C (°F)	24.2 (75.6)	24.4 (75.9)	24.3 (75.7)	24.1 (75.4)	24.2 (75.6)	24.3 (75.7)	24.3 (75.7)	24.3 (75.7)	24.0 (75.2)	23.7 (74.7)	23.6 (74.5)	23.8 (74.8)	24.1 (75.4)
Mean daily minimum °C (°F)	20.4 (68.7)	20.4 (68.7)	20.4 (68.7)	20.4 (68.7)	20.3 (68.5)	20.3 (68.5)	20.0 (68.0)	20.0 (68.0)	19.9 (67.8)	19.8 (67.6)	20.0 (68.0)	20.1 (68.2)	20.2 (68.4)
Average precipitation mm (inches)	80.1 (3.15)	106.8 (4.20)	149.3 (5.88)	227.8 (8.97)	261.5 (10.30)	216.7 (8.53)	182.0 (7.17)	220.0 (8.66)	228.2 (8.98)	273.9 (10.78)	232.5 (9.15)	141.4 (5.57)	2,320.2 (91.35)
Average precipitation days	10	11	15	21	23	22	20	22	22	22	20	15	216
Average relative humidity (%)	84	84	85	85	85	85	84	84	86	87	87	86	85
Source: IDEAM
