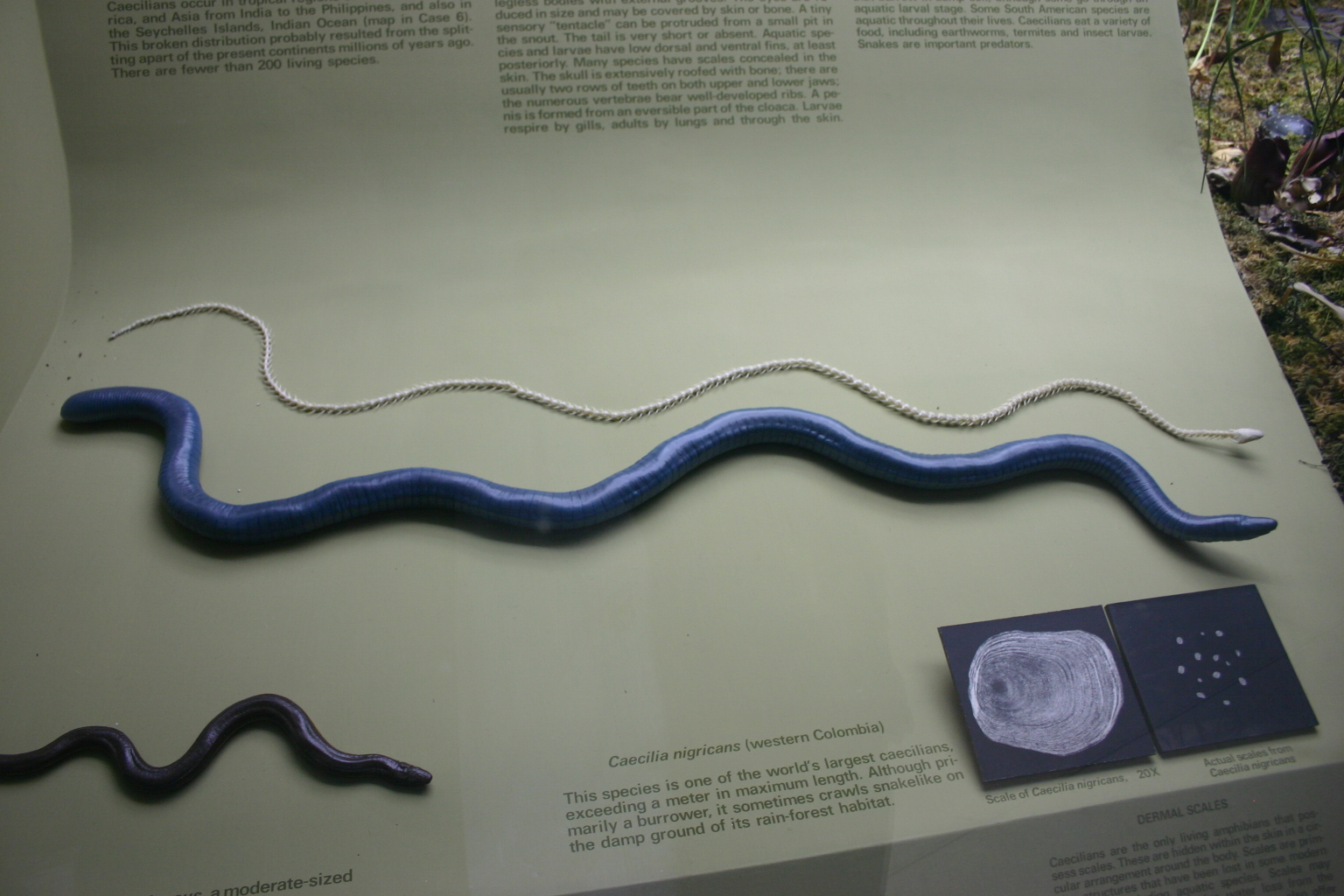
- Caecilia nigricans

Scientific classification
- Kingdom: Animalia
- Phylum: Chordata
- Class: Amphibia
- Order: Gymnophiona
- Clade: Apoda
- Family: Caeciliidae
- Genus: Caecilia; Linnaeus, 1758

Type species
- Caecilia tentaculata Linnaeus, 1758

Diversity
- See text

= Caecilia =

Genus of amphibians

Caecilia is a genus of amphibians in the family Caeciliidae.

== Species ==
Binomial name and author	Common name
Caecilia abitaguae Dunn, 1942	Abitagua caecilian
Caecilia albiventris Daudin, 1803	Whitebelly caecilian
Caecilia antioquiaensis Taylor, 1968	Antioquia caecilian
Caecilia aprix Fernández-Roldán and Rueda-Almonacid, 2022
Caecilia armata Dunn, 1942	Armored caecilian
Caecilia atelolepis Fernández-Roldán, Lynch, and Medina-Rangel, 2023
Caecilia attenuata Taylor, 1968	Santa Rosa caecilian
Caecilia bokermanni Taylor, 1968	Bokermann's caecilian
Caecilia caribea Dunn, 1942	Pensilvania caecilian
Caecilia corpulenta Taylor, 1968	Solid caecilian
Caecilia crassisquama Taylor, 1968	Normandia caecilian
Caecilia degenerata Dunn, 1942	Garagoa caecilian
Caecilia disossea Taylor, 1968	Rio Santiago caecilian
Caecilia dunni Hershkovitz, 1938	Dunn's caecilian
Caecilia epicrionopsoides Fernández-Roldán, Lynch, and Medina-Rangel, 2023
Caecilia flavopunctata Roze & Solano, 1963	Yellow-spotted caecilian
Caecilia goweri Fernández-Roldán and Lynch, 2021
Caecilia gracilis Shaw, 1802	Wormlike caecilia, slender caecilian, Surinam caecilian
Caecilia guntheri Dunn, 1942	Gunther's caecilian
Caecilia inca Taylor, 1973	Fundo Sinchona caecilian
Caecilia isthmica Cope, 1877
Caecilia leucocephala Taylor, 1968	White-headed caecilian
Caecilia macrodonta Fernández-Roldán, Lynch, and Medina-Rangel, 2023
Caecilia marcusi Wake, 1985	Villa Tunari caecilian
Caecilia mertensi Taylor, 1973	Mertens' caecilian
Caecilia museugoeldi Maciel and Hoogmoed, 2018
Caecilia nigricans Boulenger, 1902	Rio Lita caecilian
Caecilia occidentalis Taylor, 1968	Cauca caecilian
Caecilia orientalis Taylor, 1968	La Bonita caecilian
Caecilia pachynema Günther, 1859	Intac caecilian
Caecilia perdita Taylor, 1968	Andagoya caecilian
Caecilia pressula Taylor, 1968	Marudi Mountains caecilian
Caecilia pulchraserrana Acosta-Galvis, 2019
Caecilia subdermalis Taylor, 1968	Moscopan caecilian
Caecilia subnigricans Dunn, 1942	Magdalena Valley caecilian
Caecilia subterminalis Taylor, 1968	Taylor's Ecuador caecilian
Caecilia tentaculata Linnaeus, 1758	Bearded caecilia, white-bellied caecilian, Linnaeus' caecilian
Caecilia tenuissima Taylor, 1973	Guayaquil caecilian
Caecilia thompsoni Boulenger, 1902	Thompson's caecilian
Caecilia volcani Taylor, 1969	Cocle caecilian
Caecilia wilkinsoni Fernández-Roldán & Lynch, 2023
