= Caecilia mertensi =

Conservation status
- Data Deficient (IUCN 3.1)

Scientific classification
- Kingdom: Animalia
- Phylum: Chordata
- Class: Amphibia
- Order: Gymnophiona
- Clade: Apoda
- Family: Caeciliidae
- Genus: Caecilia
- Species: C. mertensi

Binomial name
- Caecilia mertensi Taylor, 1973

Species of amphibian

Caecilia mertensi is a species of caecilian in the family Caeciliidae from South America. The type locality is imprecise: the holotype was purportedly collected in "Seychelle Isle", but most likely originates from South America. However, more recently, several specimens have been collected from Mato Grosso, Brazil. The specific name mertensi honors Robert Mertens, a German zoologist and herpetologist. Common name Mertens' caecilian has been coined for this species.

== Description ==
The holotype is unsexed and measures 495 mm (19.5 in) in total length. The body is 12.5 mm (0.5 in) wide. The head is slightly tapering, and the snout is projecting. The eyes are very small but visible externally. There are 142 mostly incomplete primary folds and 48 secondary folds. The body is partly covered by scales. Coloration is light brown, turning into grayish brown laterally. The head is grayish.

== Habitat and conservation ==
There is no habitat data for the type series. The Mato Grosso records are from the Amazon biome or from its transition zone with the Cerrado. Most of the records are from areas affected by hydropower development. In 2004 it was assessed as "data deficient" for the IUCN Red List of Threatened Species.
