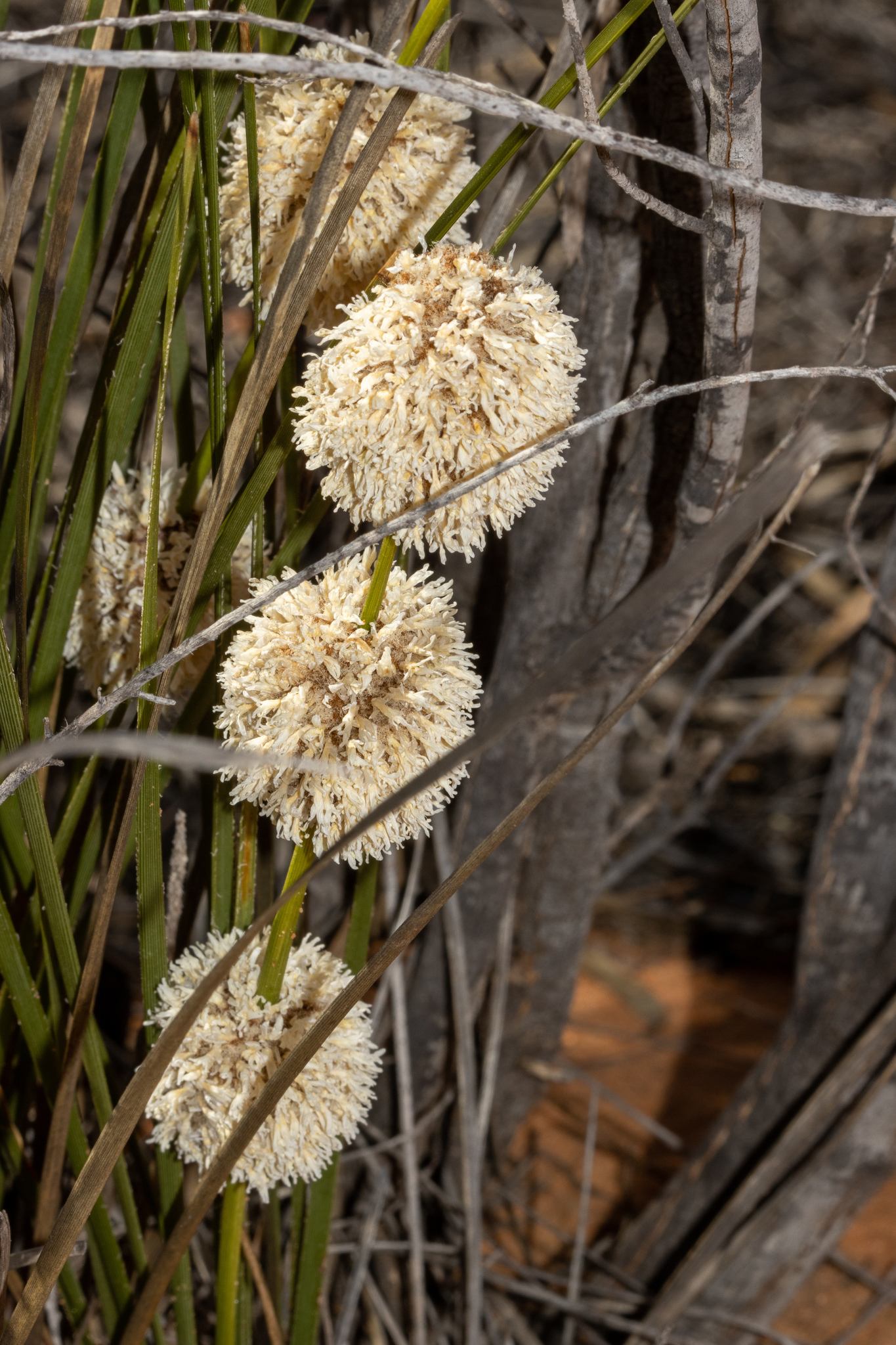

Scientific classification
- Kingdom: Plantae
- Clade: Tracheophytes
- Clade: Angiosperms
- Clade: Monocots
- Order: Asparagales
- Family: Asparagaceae
- Subfamily: Lomandroideae
- Genus: Lomandra
- Species: L. leucocephala

Binomial name
- Lomandra leucocephala Ewart

= Lomandra leucocephala =

Species of plant

Lomandra leucocephala is a perennial, rhizomatous herb found in Australia. The plant is sometimes referred to as Irongrass because the plant is known to be tough and has a grass-like look.

Lomandra leucocephala grows primarily in dry shrubland or desert biome.

== Gallery ==
Lomandra leucocephala

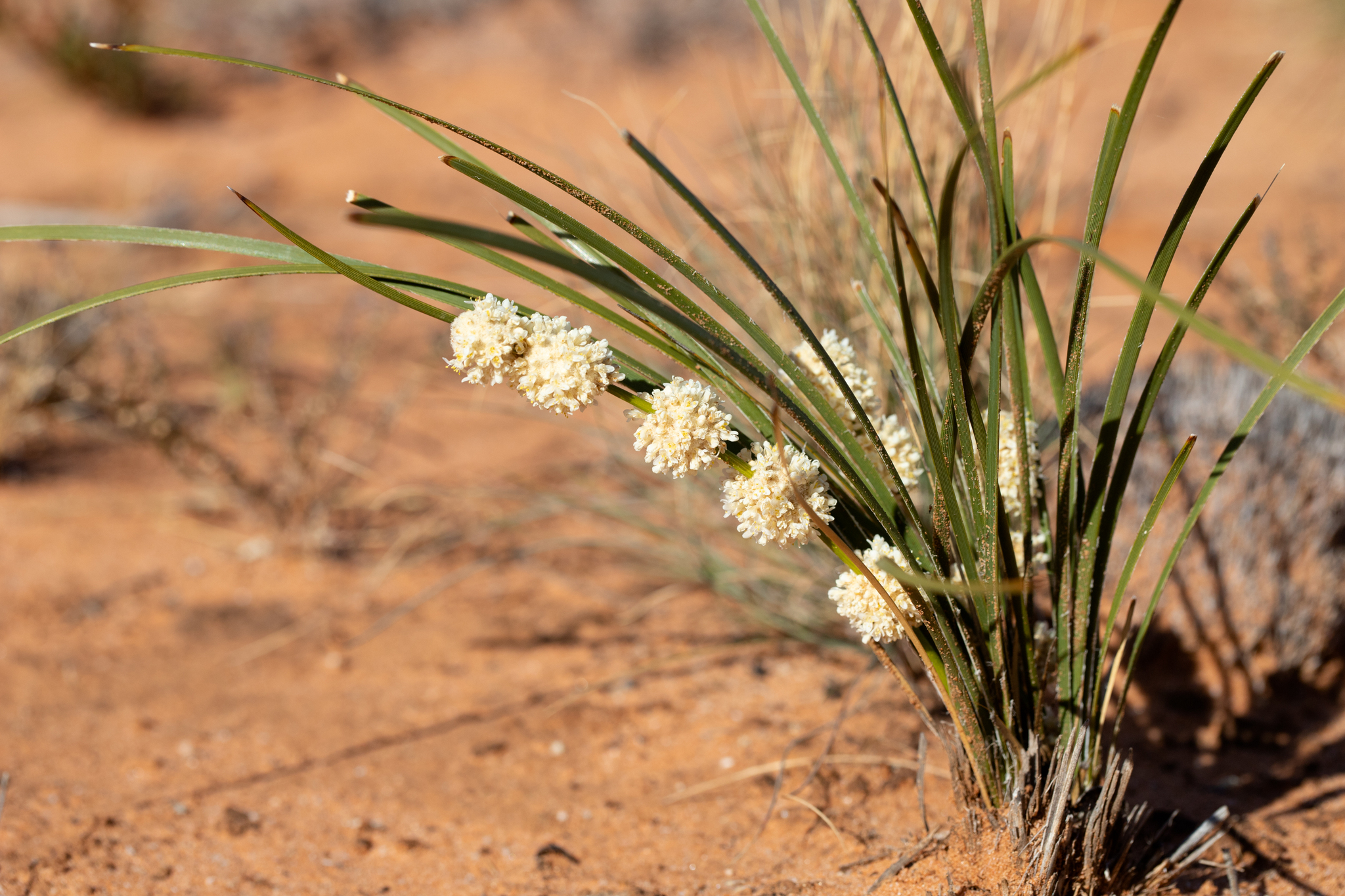

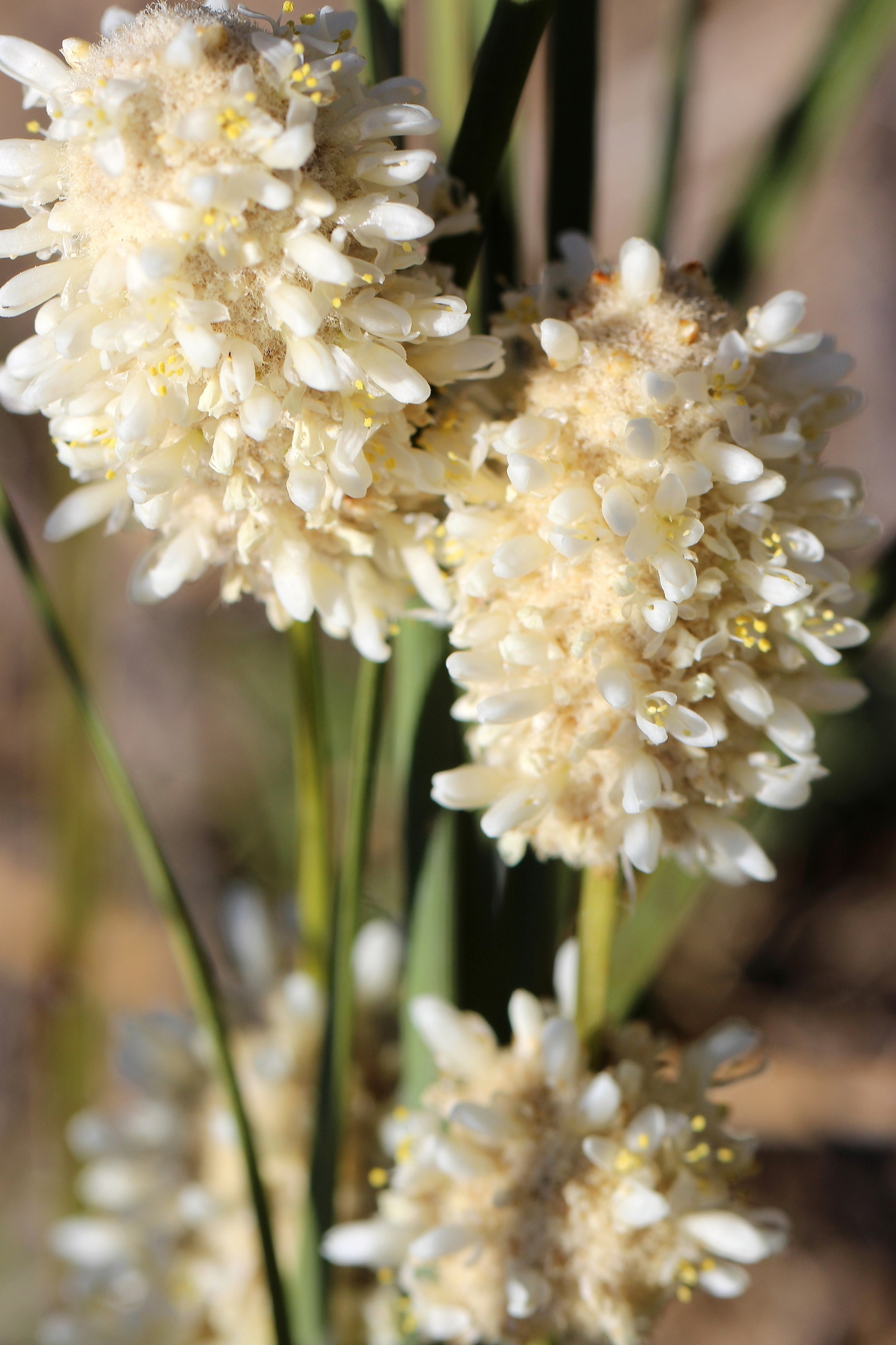

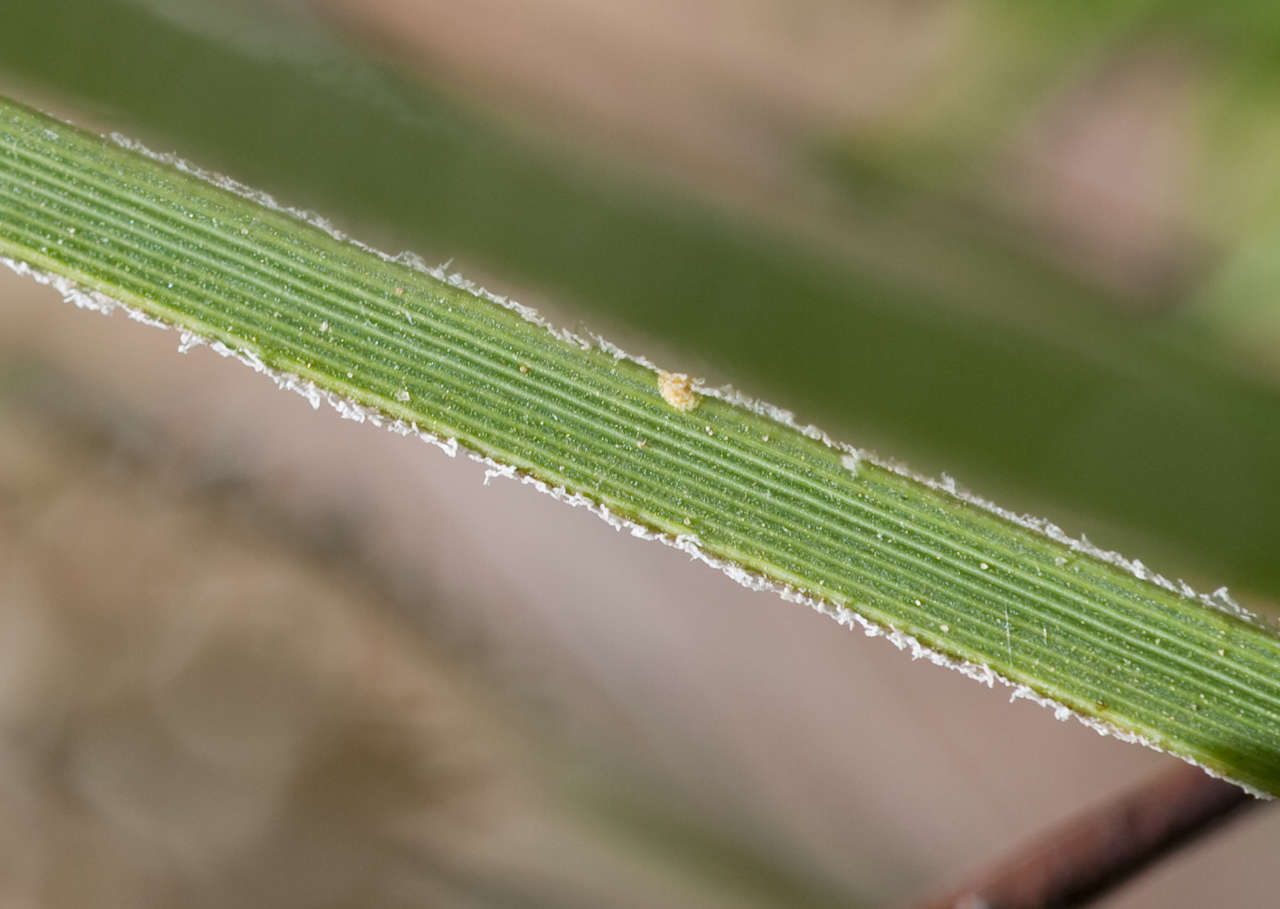

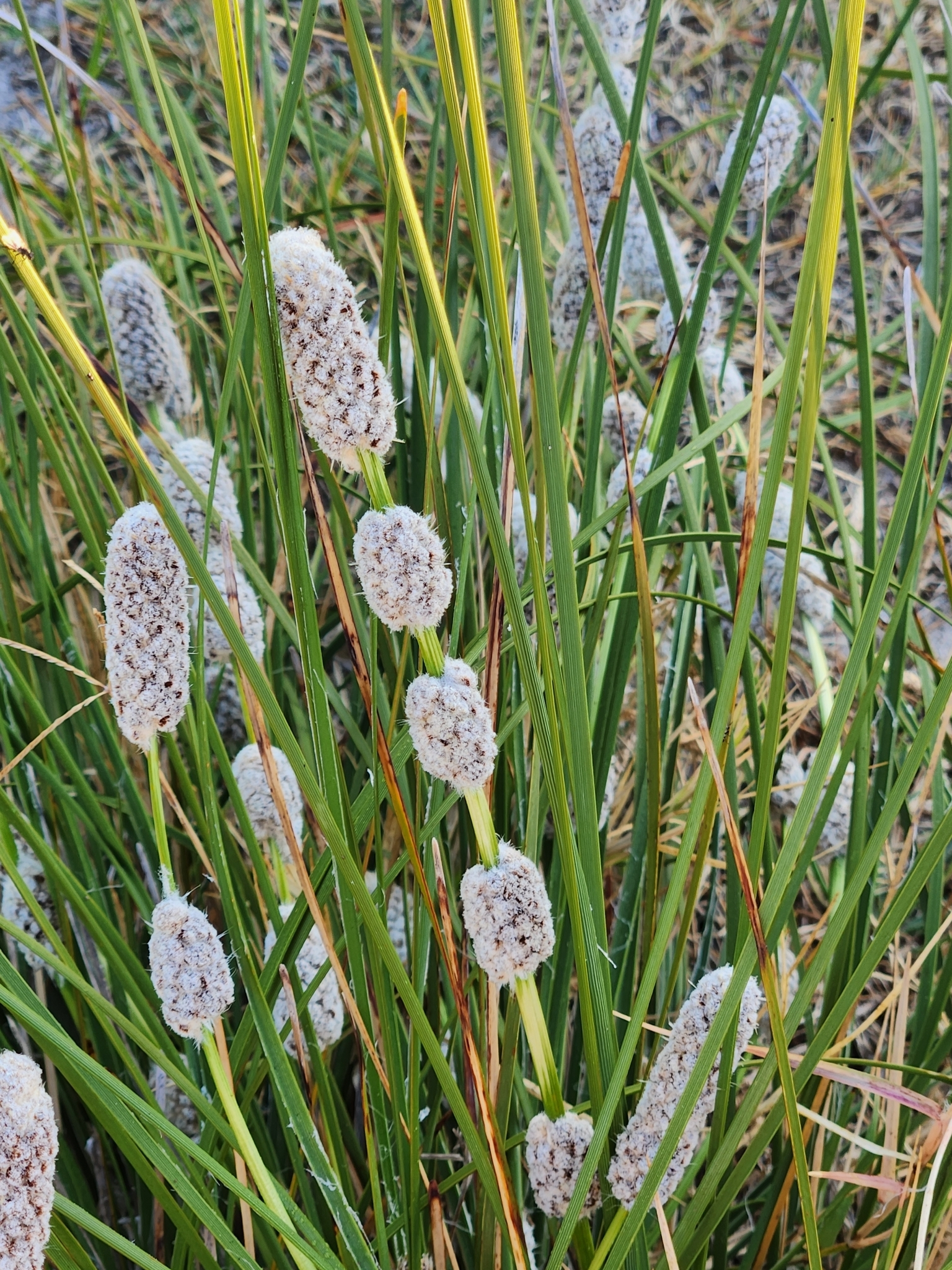
