= Rhacophorus norhayatii =

Conservation status
- Least Concern (IUCN 3.1)

Scientific classification
- Kingdom: Animalia
- Phylum: Chordata
- Class: Amphibia
- Order: Anura
- Family: Rhacophoridae
- Genus: Rhacophorus
- Species: R. norhayatii

Binomial name
- Rhacophorus norhayatii Chan and Grismer, 2010

Species of amphibian

Rhacophorus norhayatii, the orange-sided whipping frog, Norhayati's gliding frog, or Wallace's orange-sided tree frog, is a species of frog in the family Rhacophoridae. It has been observed in Malaysia, Myanmar, and Thailand, though scientists believe the Sumatran population may be another closely related specie.

Scientists believed this frog to be conspecific with Rhacophorus reinwardtii until 2010. They distinguish the species in that R. norhayatii has darker coloration on the webbed skin on its feet, which are black with blue marks. Also, the first toe of the front feet is not webbed as far as in other species, which are webbed almost all the way to disk. R. norhayatii also has brown coloration on its flanks, while R. reinwardtii has bright orange. The skin of R. norhayatii's back is green with no marks or spots. Also, R. norhayatii males are larger than those of R. reinwardtii and smaller than those of R. nigropalmatus and R. kio: The adult male R. norhayatii frog can be as big as 64.7 mm long from nose to rear end. The adult female frog can be 83 mm long.

The front feet of R. norhayatii are larger than the rest of the front leg. The frog's ventrum is white in color, except for blue and white marks on the chin and neck. The toes on all four feet are black with some blue and green marks, like the webbed skin. The climbing disks on its toes are dull green in color.

Rhacophorus norhayatii climbs on plants to a confirmed height of 7 m off the ground. It is sympatric with a few other species in Rhacophorus. Some of the places where R. norhayatii are protected parks.

Scientists named this frog norhayatii for Dr. Norhayati Ahmad of the National University of Malaysia.

== Original publication ==
- Onn CK; Grismer LL (2010). "Re-assessment of the Reinwardt's Gliding Frog, Rhacophorus reinwardtii (Schlegel 1840)(Anura: Rhacophoridae) in southern Thailand and Peninsular Malaysia with it re=description as a new species". Zootaxa. 2505: 40–50. doi:10.11646/zootaxa.2505.1.2.
