= Black-webbed treefrog =

Black-webbed treefrog or black-webbed tree frog is a common name of two species of frog in the genus Rhacophorus:

- Rhacophorus kio
- Rhacophorus reinwardtii
