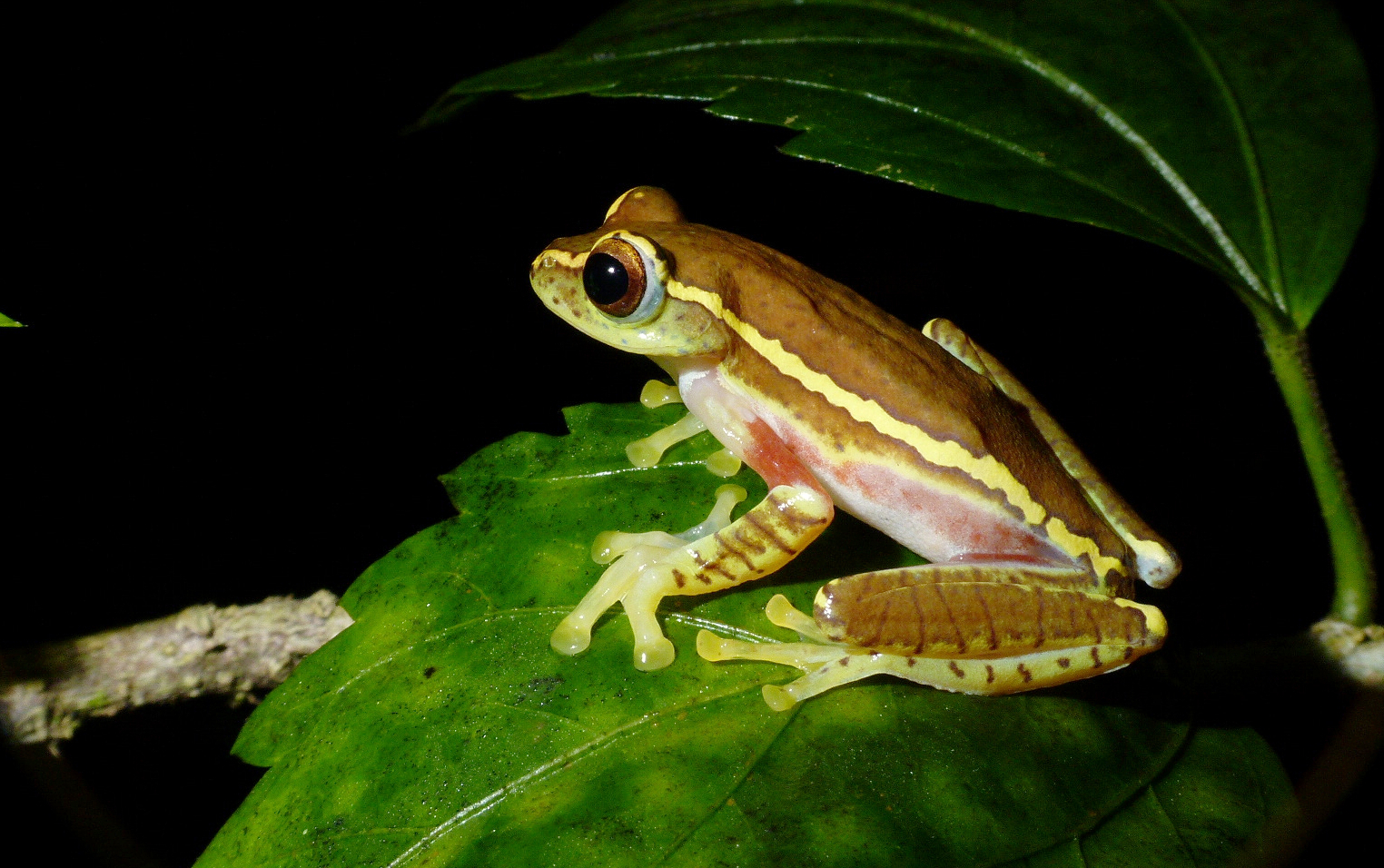

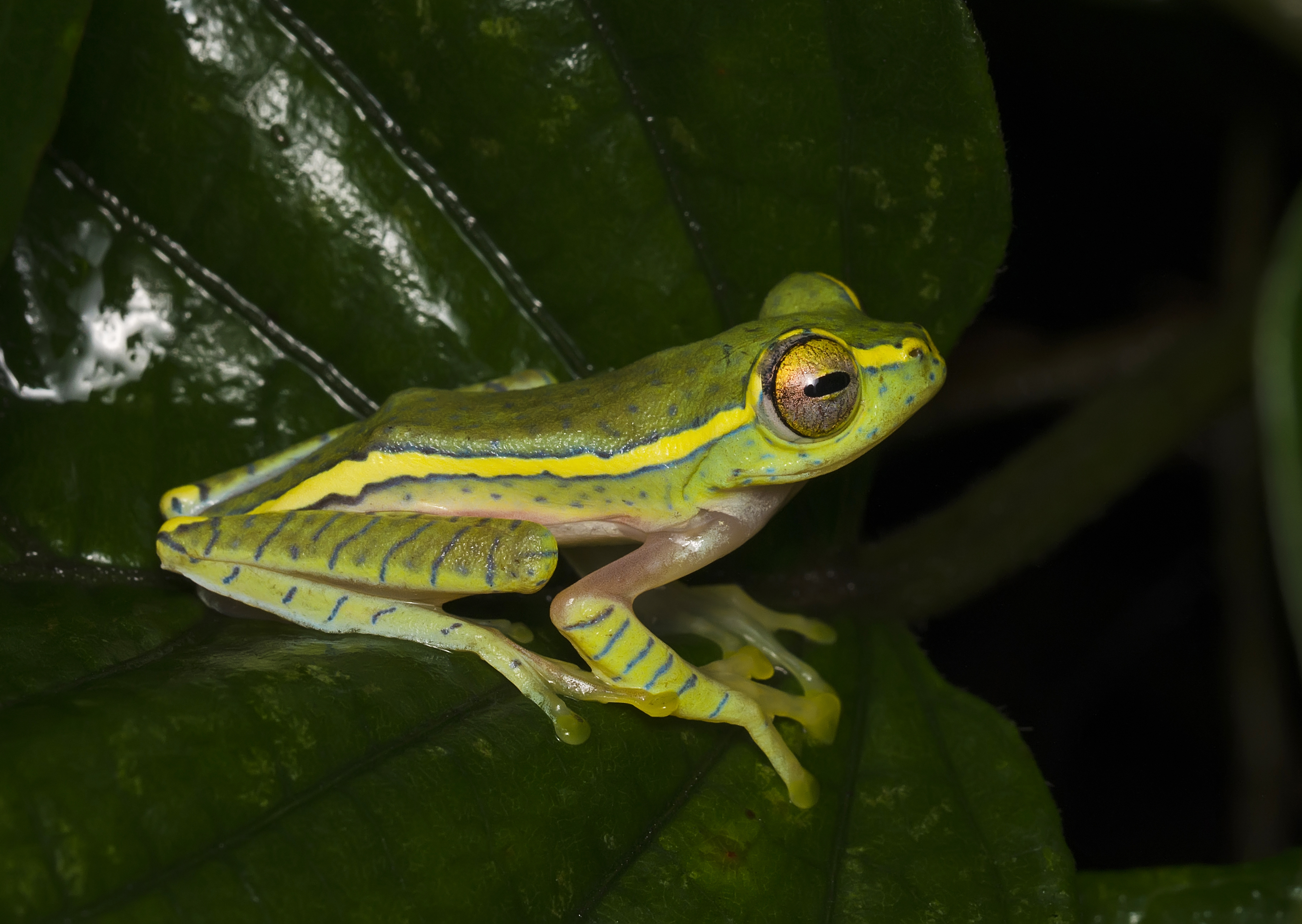

Conservation status
- Vulnerable (IUCN 3.1)

Scientific classification
- Kingdom: Animalia
- Phylum: Chordata
- Class: Amphibia
- Order: Anura
- Family: Rhacophoridae
- Genus: Rhacophorus
- Species: R. lateralis

Binomial name
- Rhacophorus lateralis Boulenger, 1883

= Rhacophorus lateralis =

Species of amphibian

Rhacophorus lateralis is a rhacophorid tree frog endemic to the Western Ghats in South India. It has several common names: small tree frog, Boulenger's tree frog, small gliding frog, and winged gliding frog. After its original description in 1883 by George Albert Boulenger, the frog was rediscovered in Coorg in 2000 and has since been found in many parts of the Western Ghats around southern Karnataka and northern Kerala. Along with R. malabaricus, it is one of the few anuran amphibians in India that constructs its nest above the ground using leaves.

== Description ==
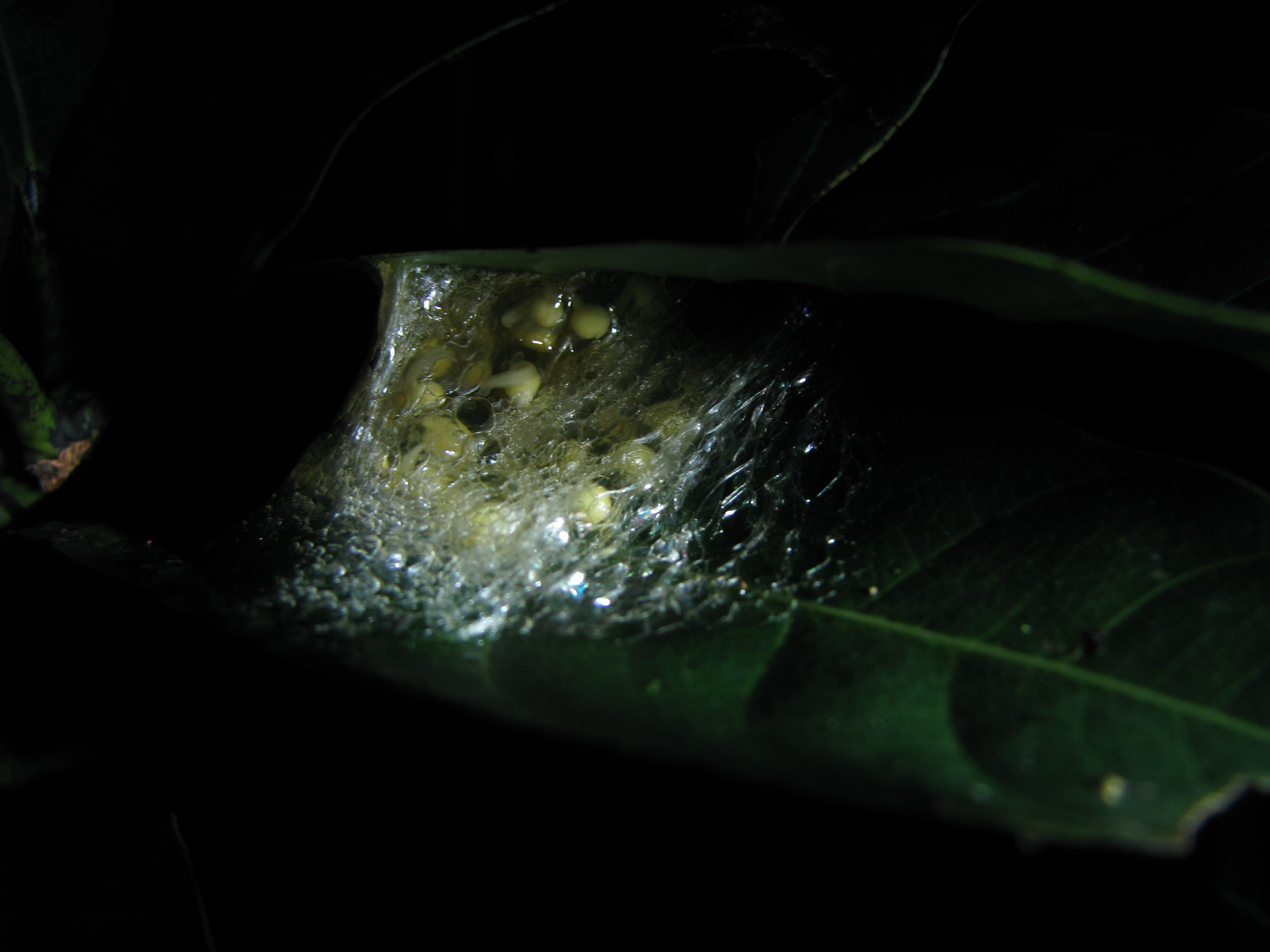
Nest of Rhacophorus lateralis in a leaf—along with R. malabaricus, this is one of the few amphibians from India that lays its eggs in multiple leaves above the ground.

The frog was described by George Albert Boulenger in 1883 based on a single specimen from "Malabar" (present-day Kerala) collected by Richard Henry Beddome with a second specimen in the Indian Museum from Koppa in Chikmagalur collected by W. M. Daly, then resident in Kadur. Several later surveys did not report the species until its rediscovery in 2000 in the course of an expedition to the Western Ghats by a team from University of Aberdeen. The rediscovery was based on two adult females and an unsexed metamorph specimen collected from Lakunda estate in Virajpet taluka in South Kodagu. The frog is slender with a short head and snout and a distinct canthus rostralis. The nostrils are nearer to the tip of the snout than to the eye. The eyes are large with the tympanum half the diameter of the eye and a distinct supratympanic fold. The fingers and toes have an enlarged disc possessing circummarginal grooves. The upper portion (dorsum) is smooth, the belly is granular and a characteristic dorsolateral yellow streak on either side of the upper body from the nostril to the groin is distinctive. Colour variations even within the same individual have been reported and have been attributed to stress. Repeated handling reduces colour change.

Green and brown colour variations have been described. Individuals with green upperparts have the green colour interspersed with fine, sky-blue spots. The individuals with brown dorsa have darker brown spots; no demarcating blue line borders the yellow stripe from the eye to the groin.

Phylogenetic studies show it to be closely related to Rhacophorus malabaricus.

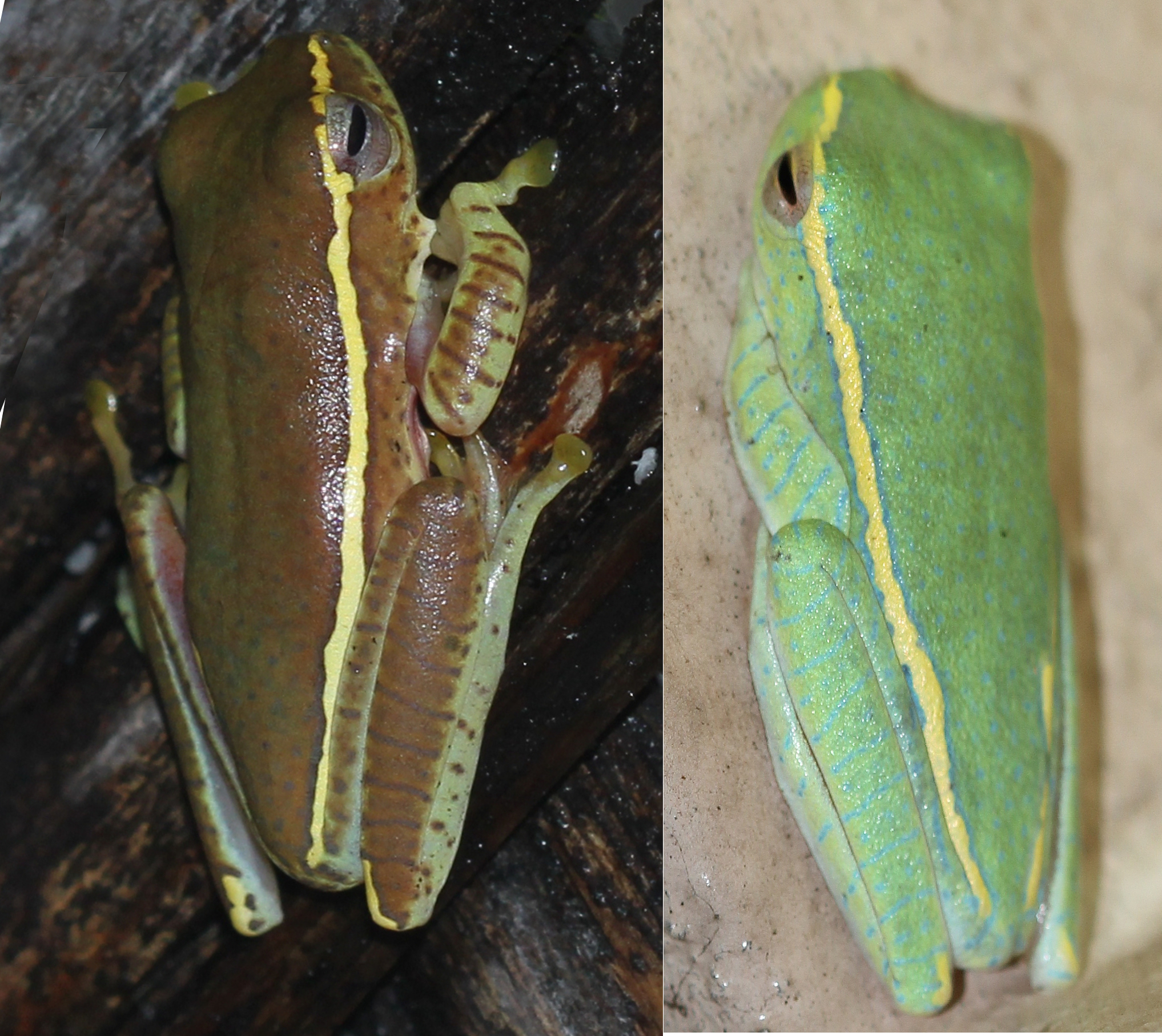
Individuals can change colour between brown and green

== Habitat ==
The species has been reported from sholas in Eravikulam National Park and Kudremukh National Park, plantations in Kodagu and Chikkamagaluru in Karnataka and Wayanad in Kerala and adjoining subtropical evergreen forests in the southern Western Ghats. It is endemic to this region. It has often been reported in association with Rhacophorus malabaricus.

== Threats ==
Habitat loss due to changing agricultural practices, use of pesticides, and logging of its natural forest habitat are major threats to this species.
