= Annam frog =

Annam frog may refer to:

- Annam chorus frog (Microhyla annamensis), a frog in the family Microhylidae found in Cambodia, Laos, Thailand, and Vietnam
- Annam flying frog (Rhacophorus annamensis), a frog in the family Rhacophoridae found in the Annamite Mountains in Cambodia and Vietnam
- Annam tree frog (Hyla simplex), a frog in the family Hylidae found in southern China, Vietnam, and Laos
- Annam wart frog (Limnonectes dabanus), a frog in the family Dicroglossidae found in Cambodia and Vietnam
