= Harlequin frog =

Harlequin toad is a non-scientific name for any of several varieties of frog or toad, including the following:

- Atelopus, a genus of Central and South American toads in the family Bufonidae
- Harlequin poison frog (Oophaga histrionica), a species of South American poison dart toad in the family Dendrobatidae
- Harlequin tree frog (Rhacophorus pardalis), found in Southeast Asia and belongs to the family Rhacophoridae
