= Rhacophorus calcaneus =

Conservation status
- Endangered (IUCN 3.1)

Scientific classification
- Kingdom: Animalia
- Phylum: Chordata
- Class: Amphibia
- Order: Anura
- Family: Rhacophoridae
- Genus: Rhacophorus
- Species: R. calcaneus

Binomial name
- Rhacophorus calcaneus Smith, 1924

Synonyms
- Rhacophorus chuyangsinensis Orlov, Nguyen, and Ho, 2008

Species of frog

Rhacophorus calcaneus (vernacular name: Vietnam flying frog) is a species of frog in the family Rhacophoridae. It is endemic to Vietnam. It has been extensively confused with Rhacophorus robertingeri, making it difficult to know its true range. Its natural habitats are evergreen forests at elevations of 1,300–2,000 m (4,300–6,600 ft) above sea level. It is threatened by collection for the international pet trade and by habitat loss and degradation caused by rapidly expanding agriculture, including cash crops such as rubber, coffee and tea.
