= Rhacophorus bengkuluensis =

Conservation status
- Vulnerable (IUCN 3.1)

Scientific classification
- Kingdom: Animalia
- Phylum: Chordata
- Class: Amphibia
- Order: Anura
- Family: Rhacophoridae
- Genus: Rhacophorus
- Species: R. bengkuluensis

Binomial name
- Rhacophorus bengkuluensis Streicher, Hamidy, Harvey, Anders, Shaney, Kurniawan, and Smith, 2014

Species of frog

Rhacophorus bengkuluensis is a species of frog in the family Rhacophoridae. It is endemic to Sumatra in Indonesia. Scientists believe it lives between 250 and 900 meters above sea level.

This species was previously considered the same as Rhacophorus catamitus, but now scientists believe these are two different species.
