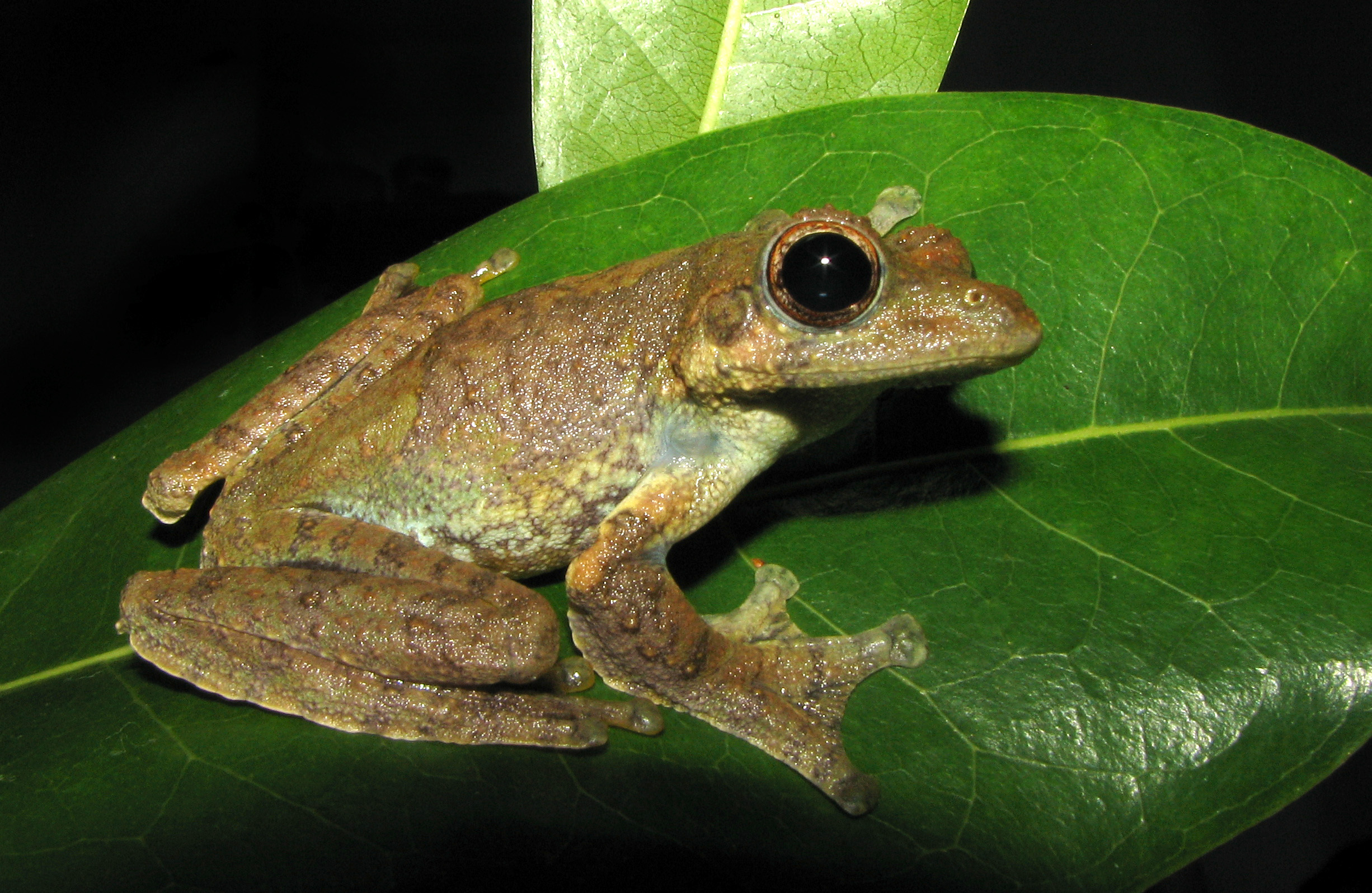

Conservation status
- Endangered (IUCN 3.1)

Scientific classification
- Kingdom: Animalia
- Phylum: Chordata
- Class: Amphibia
- Order: Anura
- Family: Rhacophoridae
- Genus: Rhacophorus
- Species: R. calcadensis

Binomial name
- Rhacophorus calcadensis Ahl, 1927

Synonyms
- Rhacophorus beddomii Boulenger, 1882

= Rhacophorus calcadensis =

Species of amphibian

Rhacophorus calcadensis, also known as the Kalakad gliding frog, Kalakkad tree frog, and Langbian flying frog, is a species of frog in the family Rhacophoridae endemic to the southern Western Ghats in Kerala and Tamil Nadu states, India. Its name refers to its type locality, the town of Kalakkad in Tamil Nadu.

== Description ==
Their size ranges from 20 to 90 mm. Dorsal coloration is pale greenish-brown with mottling on the flanks. The underbelly is fawn to pale green. Webbing of similar coloration exists between the fingers and toes. Skin flaps are found on fore and hind limbs, with a spur on each hind limb.

== Habitat and habits ==
Its natural habitats are tropical moist lowland forests, montane forests, and rivers. It is observed over heights of 30 m in the forest canopy during the day. They breed before or after monsoon seasons by descending to shallow pools or slow-flowing streams. Groups of four or five males vocalize around females, making a moderately loud "chuch-chrrr-chuck-chuck-chuck" call. They build foam nests on vegetation hanging over shallow pools of water. The nest is similar to, but smaller in size, than that of Rhacophorus malabaricus.

It is threatened by habitat loss.
