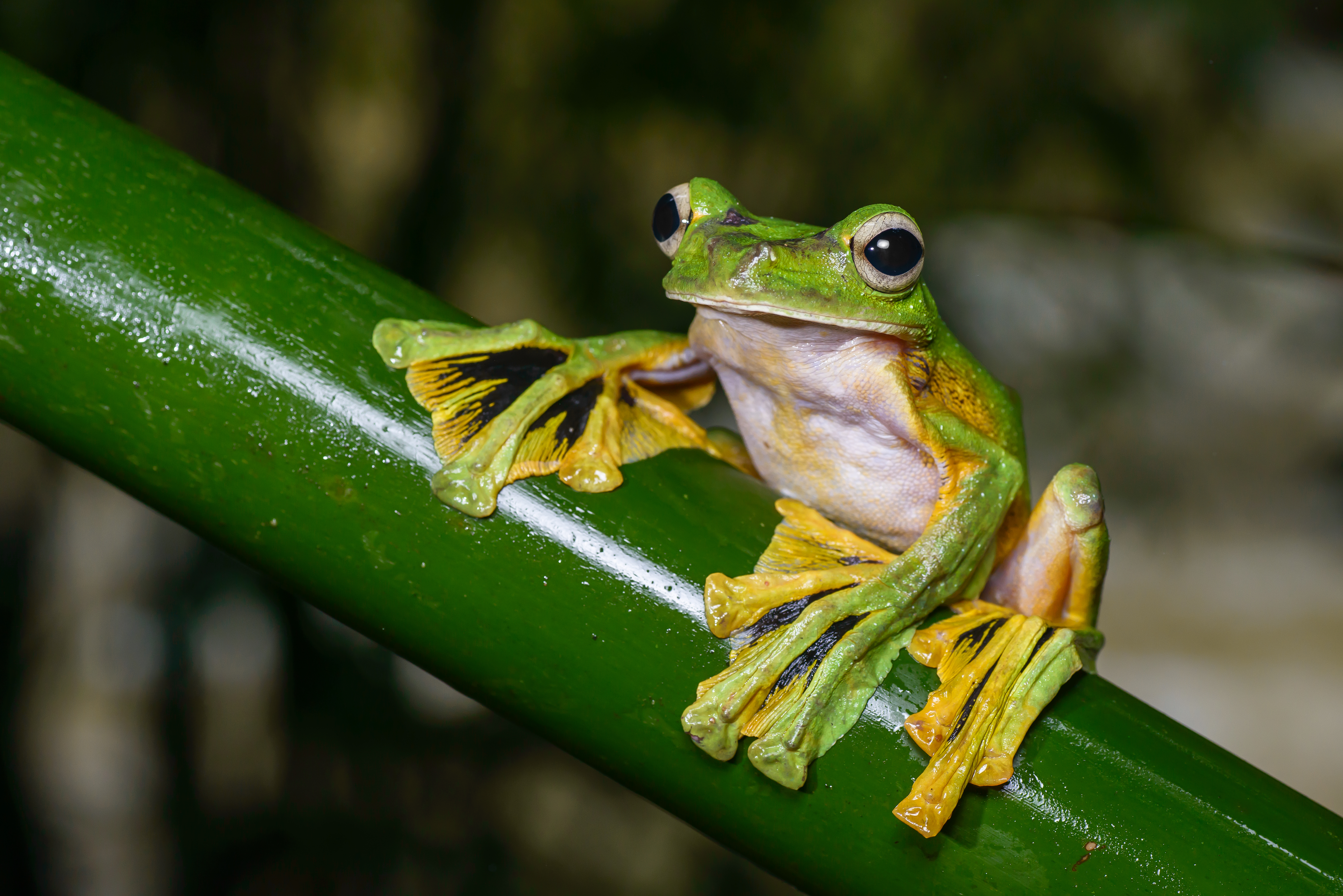

Conservation status
- Least Concern (IUCN 3.1)

Scientific classification
- Kingdom: Animalia
- Phylum: Chordata
- Class: Amphibia
- Order: Anura
- Family: Rhacophoridae
- Genus: Rhacophorus
- Species: R. nigropalmatus

Binomial name
- Rhacophorus nigropalmatus Boulenger, 1895

= Wallace's flying frog =

Species of amphibian

Wallace's flying frog (Rhacophorus nigropalmatus), also known as the gliding frog or the Abah River flying frog, is a moss frog found at least from the Malay Peninsula into western Indonesia and southern Thailand, and is present in Borneo and Sumatra. It is named for the biologist, Alfred R. Wallace, who collected the first known specimen.

== Taxonomy ==
R. dennysii, R. maximus and Polypedates feae were once contained within Wallace's flying frog as subspecies. Similar frogs also occur in Laos, Vietnam, Malaysia, Thailand and southern China; these may be R. nigropalmatus or an undescribed, closely related species.

== Description ==
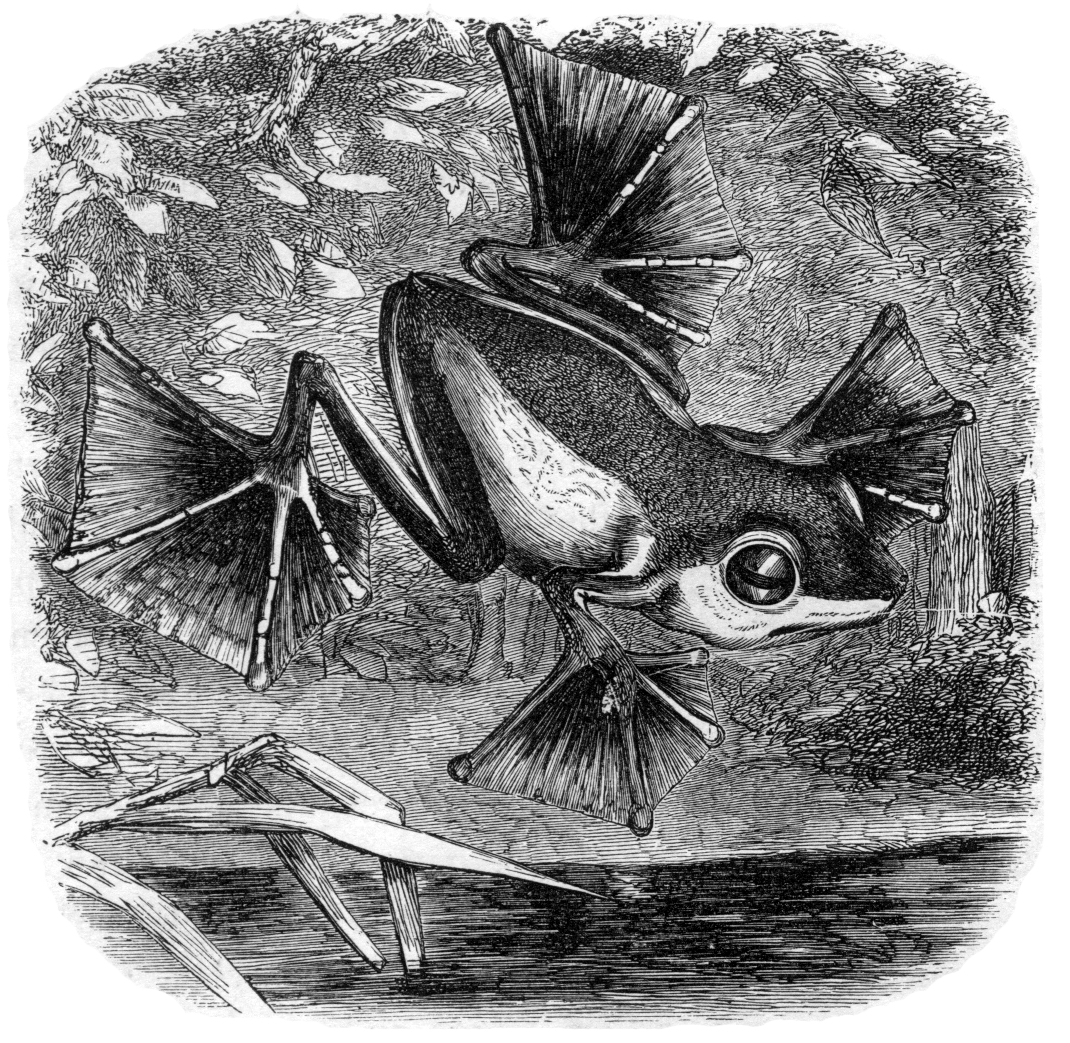
Illustration from Wallace's 1869 The Malay Archipelago by J. G. Keulemans

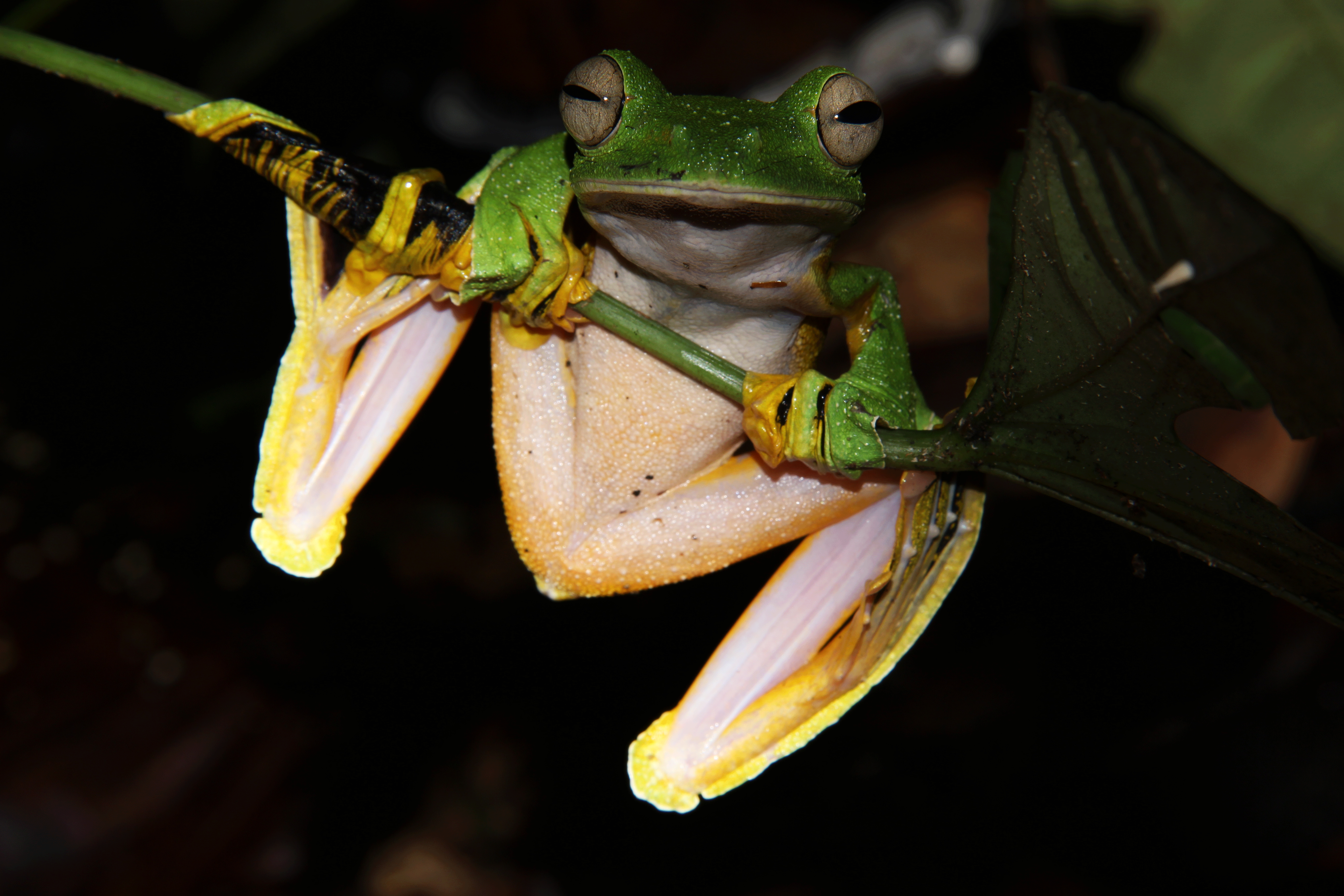
A Wallace's flying frog in its natural habitat

This frog is quite photogenic, due to its large size, brilliant colors, and interesting behavior. With a body length of about 80–100 mm (males are smaller than females), it is one of the largest species of Rhacophorus. Its eardrums are large, as well as its eyes, which feature horizontal pupils. Its limbs are very long, and its fingers and toes are webbed right to the tips. Together with a fringe of skin stretching between the limbs, this flying frog can parachute to the forest floor from high in the trees where it is normally found.

Its back is bright shiny green, and the underside is white to pale yellow. The upper sides of the inside toes, as well as the outer parts of the toe and finger webbing, are brilliant yellow. The base of the webs and one flank spot per side are jet black. Overall, this frog looks much like the green flying frog (R. reinwardtii) and R. kio, which even if full grown do not reach the size of Wallace's flying frog, though, and have more orange web fringes.

They live almost exclusively in the trees, descending only to mate and lay eggs. They can leap and "fly" from tree to tree or to bushes. When threatened or in search of prey, they will leap from a branch and splay their four webbed feet. They utilize their patagia, membranes between their toes and loose skin flaps on their sides, to catch the air as they fall, helping them to glide, sometimes 50 feet (15 meters) or more, to a neighboring tree branch or even all the way to the ground. They also have oversized toe pads to help them land softly and stick to tree trunks. They survive mainly on insects, but have been known to consume toads and small birds. The species is known to fall prey to tree climbing snakes.

The female creates a bubble nest by lashing fluids she produces, on a branch or on foliage above water. She lays her eggs in the nest and the male fertilises them. When they hatch, the tadpoles develop in the nest until it breaks up and they fall into the water below. Here they continue their development, and undergo metamorphosis into juvenile frogs. Young frogs are reddish brown with white spots for around a year before maturing into green adults, which is thought to ward off predation by mimicking feces.

== Distribution and habitat ==
The frog is found throughout Thailand, Myanmar and Peninsular Malaysia, as well as on Sumatra in Indonesia and Borneo (Brunei, Malaysia, and Indonesia). This frog lives in trees, palm trees, bushes, and similar plants. It has been found both in primary forest and in areas that had been subject to logging, ranging in elevation between 700 &1800 feet above sea level.

== See also ==
- Flying frog

== Sources ==
- Bordoloi, Sabitry; Bortamuli, Tutul; Ohler, Annemarie (2007). "Systematics of the genus Rhacophorus (Amphibia, Anura): identity of red-webbed forms and description of a new species from Assam" (PDF). Zootaxa (1653): 1–20. doi:10.11646/zootaxa.1653.1.1.
- Sukumaran, Jeet (2005). "Encounter with Wallace's Flying Frog, The Frog of the Monsoons".
- Tunstall, Tate, ed. (2003). "Rhacophorus nigropalmatus, Wallace's Flying Frog". AmphibiaWeb.
