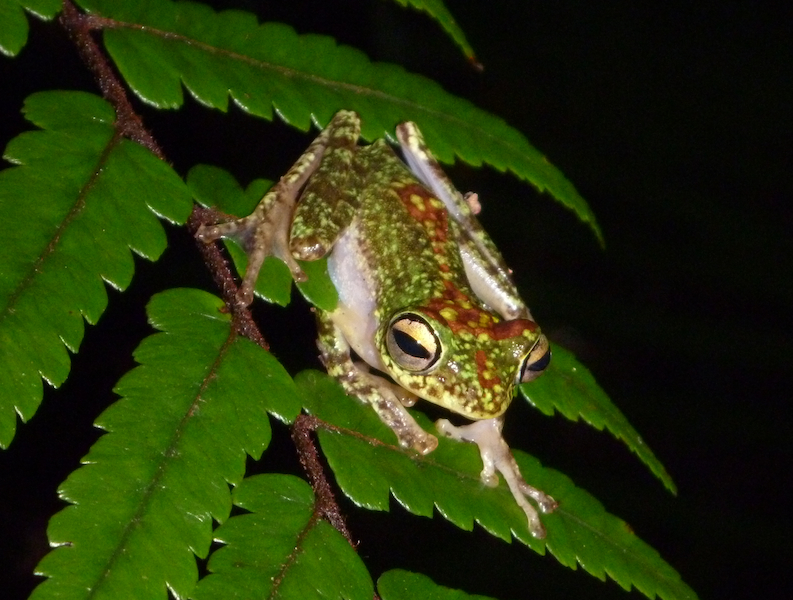

Conservation status
- Least Concern (IUCN 3.1)

Scientific classification
- Kingdom: Animalia
- Phylum: Chordata
- Class: Amphibia
- Order: Anura
- Family: Rhacophoridae
- Genus: Rhacophorus
- Species: R. edentulus

Binomial name
- Rhacophorus edentulus Müller, 1894

= Rhacophorus edentulus =

Species of frog

Rhacophorus edentulus (Celebes flying frog) is a species of frog in the family Rhacophoridae endemic to Sulawesi, Indonesia. Its natural habitats are rivers, freshwater marshes, and intermittent freshwater marshes.
