= Rhacophorus poecilonotus =

Conservation status
- Least Concern (IUCN 3.1)

Scientific classification
- Kingdom: Animalia
- Phylum: Chordata
- Class: Amphibia
- Order: Anura
- Family: Rhacophoridae
- Genus: Rhacophorus
- Species: R. poecilonotus

Binomial name
- Rhacophorus poecilonotus Boulenger, 1920

Synonyms
- Rhacophorus schlegelii poecilonotus — Wolf, 1936

Species of frog

Rhacophorus poecilonotus, also known as the Sumatra flying frog, is a species of frog in the family Rhacophoridae. It is endemic to Sumatra, Indonesia.

== Description ==
Rhacophorus poecilonotus measure about 60 mm (2.4 in) in snout–vent length. The head is strongly depressed. The snout is rounded or pointed. The tympanum is distinct. The fingers are half-webbed while the toes are fully webbed. A calcar is present on the heel. Dorsal colouration is purple with two white dorsolateral bands. The flanks are black with white blotches. Ventral colouration is white. The digital webbing is dark. Males have a subgular vocal sac.

== Habitat and conservation ==
Rhacophorus poecilonotus occurs in primary and secondary submontane and montane forests along streams at elevations of 850–1,700 m (2,790–5,580 ft) above sea level. It has also been found in tea, coconut palm and coffee plantations, and vegetable and rice cultivations near forest edge. Breeding takes place in streams.

Although considered rare by the International Union for Conservation of Nature (IUCN) in its 2004 assessment, later research has found this species to be relatively widely distributed and at times even abundant, i.e., during the breeding season. Although it does tolerate habitat disturbance, it can be threatened by habitat loss caused by logging and conversion of land into agricultural use. It is present in several protected areas.
