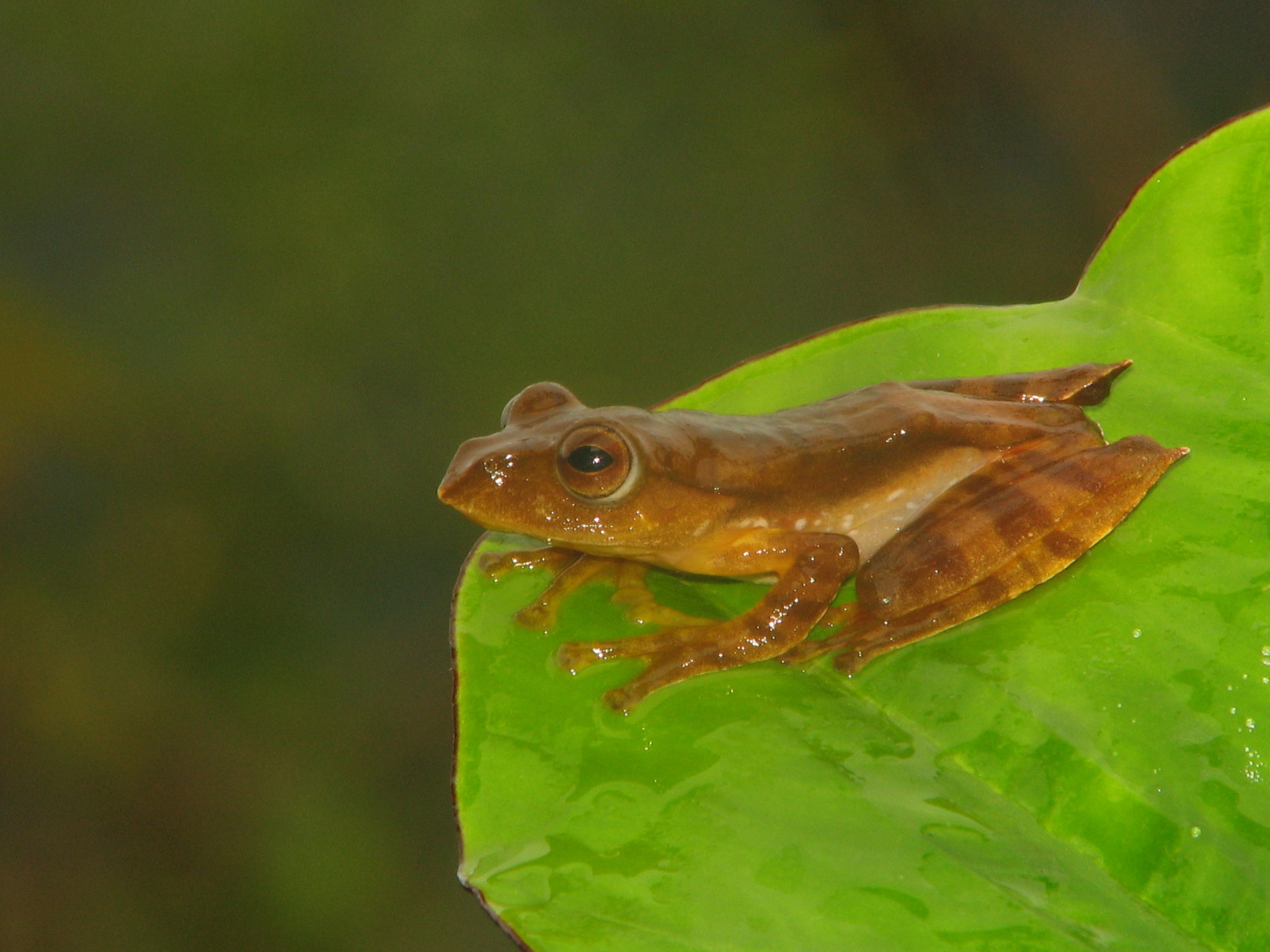
- From Arunachal Pradesh, India.

Conservation status
- Near Threatened (IUCN 3.1)

Scientific classification
- Kingdom: Animalia
- Phylum: Chordata
- Class: Amphibia
- Order: Anura
- Family: Rhacophoridae
- Genus: Rhacophorus
- Species: R. translineatus

Binomial name
- Rhacophorus translineatus Wu, 1977

Synonyms
- Huangixalus translineatus (Wu, 1977)

= Rhacophorus translineatus =

Species of frog

Rhacophorus translineatus is a species of frog in the family Rhacophoridae. It is found in eastern Tibet (China) and in Arunachal Pradesh, northeastern Indiaand Bhutan.

Rhacophorus translineatus occurs in forests at elevations of 1,200–1,500 m (3,900–4,900 ft) above sea level. Specimens have been found on banana leaves. Breeding takes place in lentic habitats such as lakes. Threats to this species are unknown.
