= Rhacophorus viridimaculatus =

Conservation status
- Data Deficient (IUCN 3.1)

Scientific classification
- Kingdom: Animalia
- Phylum: Chordata
- Class: Amphibia
- Order: Anura
- Family: Rhacophoridae
- Genus: Rhacophorus
- Species: R. viridimaculatus

Binomial name
- Rhacophorus viridimaculatus Ostroshabov, Orlov, and Nguyen, 2013

Species of frog

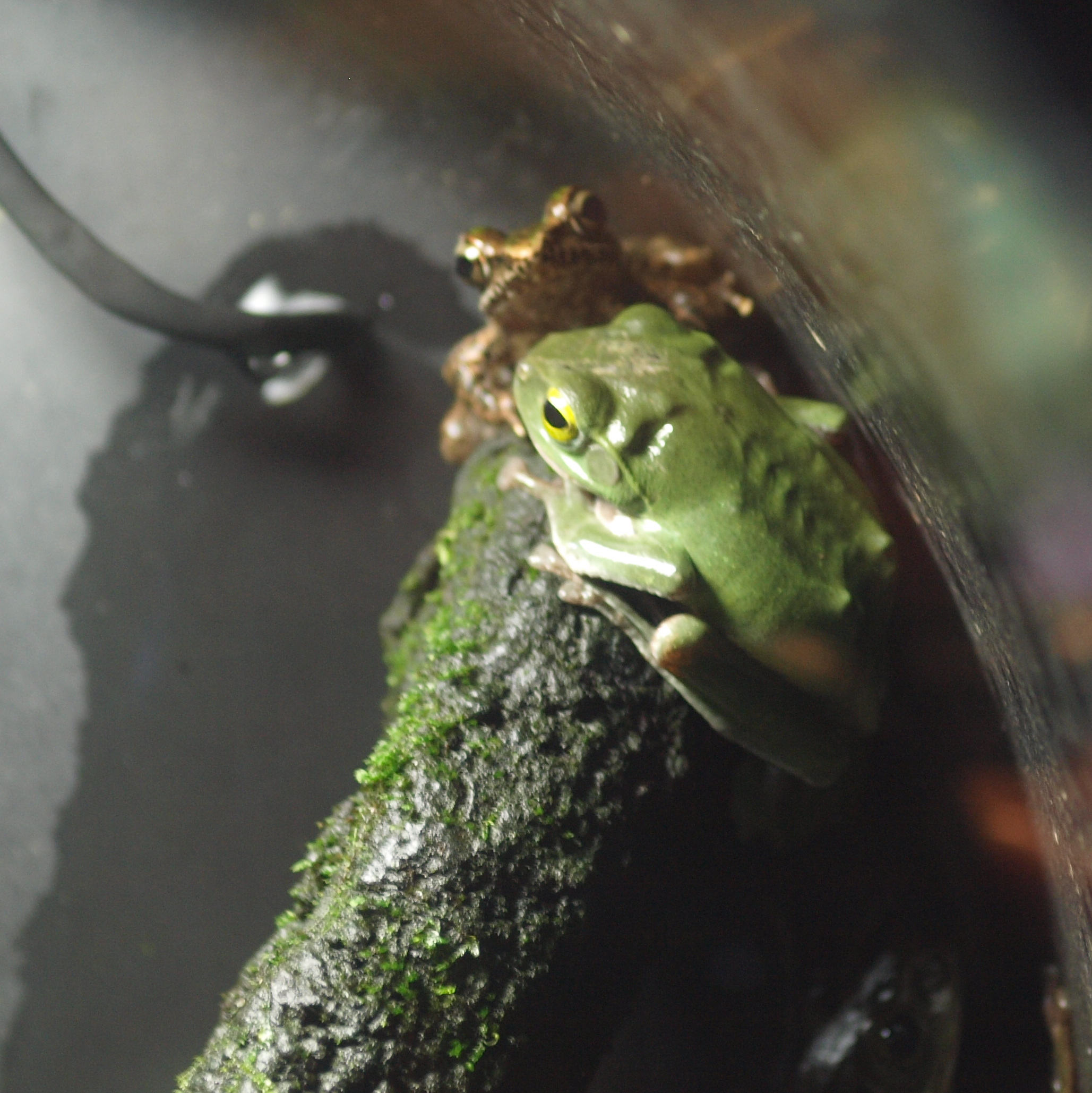
Rhacophorus viridis

Rhacophorus viridimaculatus, the green-spotted tree frog, is a species of frog in the family Rhacophoridae. It is endemic to Vietnam in Ha Giang Province and Tuyen Quang Province and suspected in China's Guangxi Province. It has been observed between 600 and 1300 meters above sea level.

== Original description ==
- Ostroshabov AA; Orlov NL; Nguyen TT (2013). "Taxonomy of frogs of genus Rhacophorus of "hoanglienensis-orlovi" complex". Russian J Herpetol (Abstract). 20 (4): 301–324.
