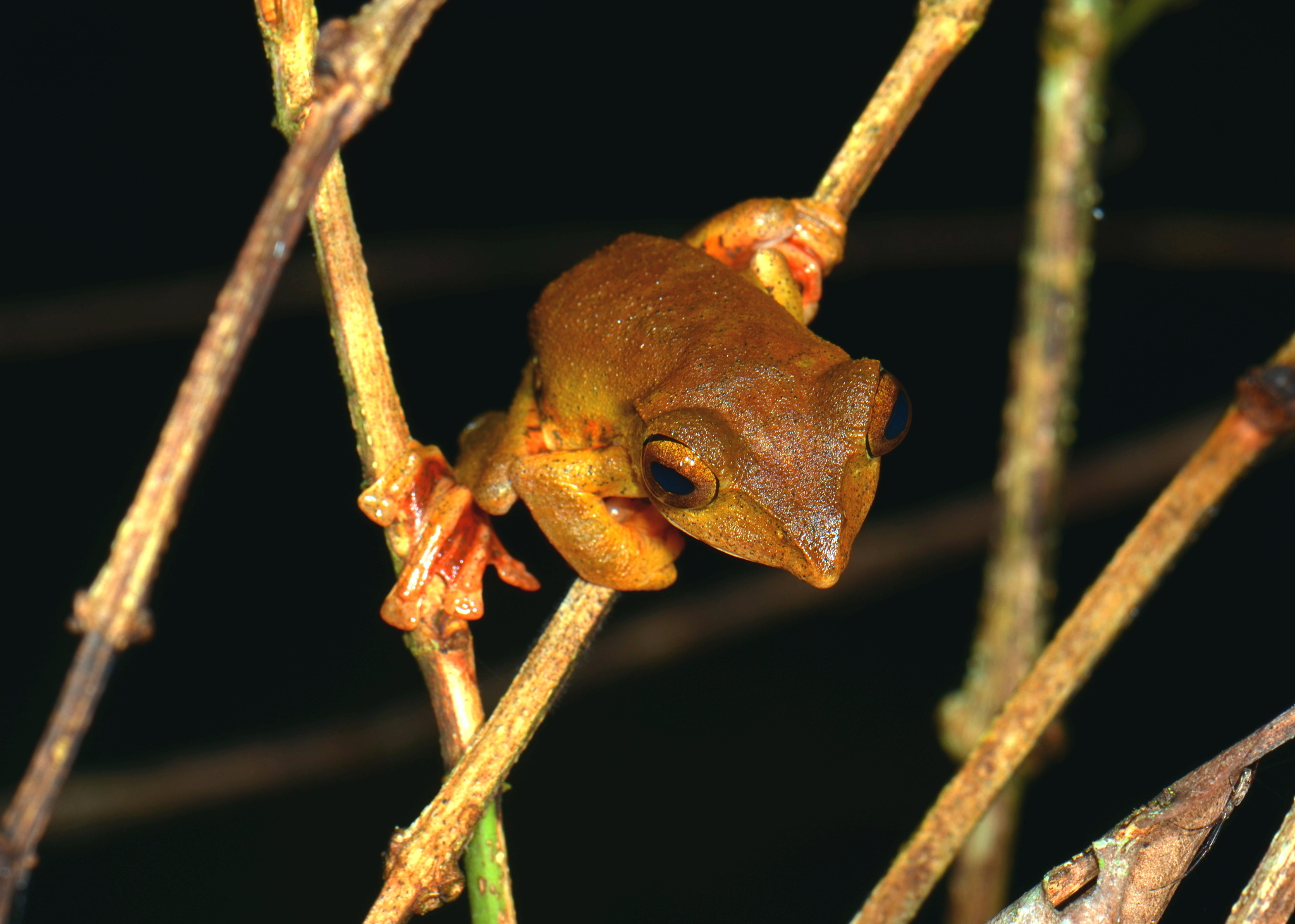

Conservation status
- Least Concern (IUCN 3.1)

Scientific classification
- Kingdom: Animalia
- Phylum: Chordata
- Class: Amphibia
- Order: Anura
- Family: Rhacophoridae
- Genus: Rhacophorus
- Species: R. barisani

Binomial name
- Rhacophorus barisani Harvey, Pemberton & Smith, 2002

= Rhacophorus barisani =

Species of frog

Rhacophorus barisani is a species of frog in the family Rhacophoridae endemic to Indonesia. Its natural habitats are subtropical or tropical moist montane forests, rivers, and freshwater marshes. It is threatened by habitat loss.
