= Rhacophorus turpes =

Conservation status
- Data Deficient (IUCN 3.1)

Scientific classification
- Kingdom: Animalia
- Phylum: Chordata
- Class: Amphibia
- Order: Anura
- Family: Rhacophoridae
- Genus: Rhacophorus
- Species: R. turpes

Binomial name
- Rhacophorus turpes Smith, 1940

Species of frog

Rhacophorus turpes (common names: Htingnan flying frog, Htingnan whipping treefrog) is a species of frog in the family Rhacophoridae. It is endemic to northern Myanmar. Little is known about this species that is only known from the original collection in 1937–1939 by Ronald Kaulback. The type locality, "Htingnan", is in Kachin State, with an approximate altitude of 900–1,200 m (3,000–3,900 ft) above sea level.

== Habitat ==
Rhacophorus turpes is probably an arboreal forest dweller.

== Description ==
The syntypes, a male and a female, measured 32 mm (1.3 in) and 38 mm (1.5 in) in snout–vent length, respectively. They are pale pinkish-brownish above, with black spots (in the male) or an indistinct darker path (the female). Skin is smooth above but strongly granulate upon the belly and the anal region. Fingers are half-webbed whereas the toes are fully webbed.
