= Rhacophorus baluensis =

Conservation status
- Least Concern (IUCN 3.1)

Scientific classification
- Kingdom: Animalia
- Phylum: Chordata
- Class: Amphibia
- Order: Anura
- Family: Rhacophoridae
- Genus: Rhacophorus
- Species: R. baluensis

Binomial name
- Rhacophorus baluensis Inger, 1954

Species of frog

Rhacophorus baluensis (common name: Balu flying frog) is a species of frog in the family Rhacophoridae found in northern Sabah and Sarawak in Malaysian Borneo. It is likely to be found in northern Kalimantan. Its natural habitats are submontane and montane forests. Male frogs gather at small ponds. It is potentially threatened by habitat loss caused by logging.
