= Rhacophorus verrucopus =

Conservation status
- Near Threatened (IUCN 3.1)

Scientific classification
- Kingdom: Animalia
- Phylum: Chordata
- Class: Amphibia
- Order: Anura
- Family: Rhacophoridae
- Genus: Rhacophorus
- Species: R. verrucopus

Binomial name
- Rhacophorus verrucopus Huang, 1983

Species of frog

Rhacophorus verrucopus is a species of frog in the family Rhacophoridae, which is found in China and possibly India. Rhacophorus Verrucopus has also been recorded in Myanmar from a field study in 2019. Its natural habitats are subtropical or tropical moist lowland forests, subtropical or tropical moist montane forests, subtropical or tropical moist shrubland, and freshwater lakes.
