= Rhacophorus modestus =

Conservation status
- Least Concern (IUCN 3.1)

Scientific classification
- Kingdom: Animalia
- Phylum: Chordata
- Class: Amphibia
- Order: Anura
- Family: Rhacophoridae
- Genus: Rhacophorus
- Species: R. modestus

Binomial name
- Rhacophorus modestus Boulenger, 1920

Species of frog

Rhacophorus modestus is a species of frog in the family Rhacophoridae endemic to Sumatra, Indonesia. Its common name is Boulenger's flying frog. It is only known from the type series collected from a montane forest on the Mount Kerinci, within the Kerinci Seblat National Park. Habitat loss is occurring on the lower slopes of the mountain.
