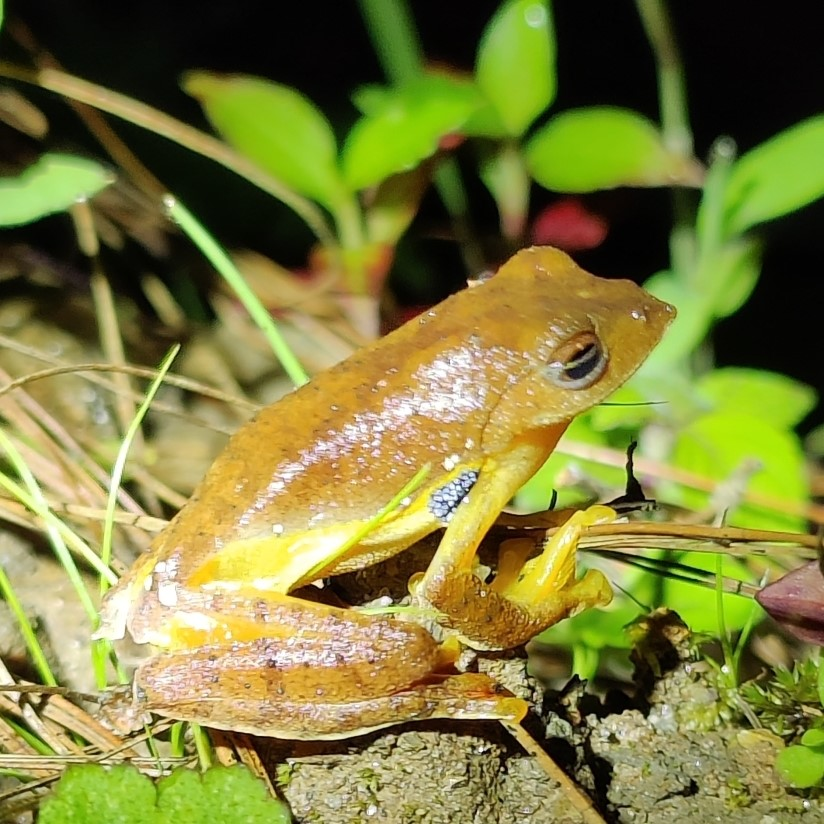

Scientific classification
- Domain: Eukaryota
- Kingdom: Animalia
- Phylum: Chordata
- Class: Amphibia
- Order: Anura
- Family: Rhacophoridae
- Genus: Rhacophorus
- Species: R. subansiriensis

Binomial name
- Rhacophorus subansiriensis Mathew and Sen, 2009

= Rhacophorus subansiriensis =

Species of frog

Rhacophorus subansiriensis is a species of frog in the family Rhacophoridae. Scientists know it exclusively from the type locality in India: Lower Subansiri District in Arunachal Pradesh.

== Original publication ==
- Mathew R; Sen N (2009). Studies on little known amphibian species of north east India (book). Vol. 293. pp. 1–64. ISBN 9788181712110.
