= Rhacophorus spelaeus =

Conservation status
- Vulnerable (IUCN 3.1)

Scientific classification
- Kingdom: Animalia
- Phylum: Chordata
- Class: Amphibia
- Order: Anura
- Family: Rhacophoridae
- Genus: Rhacophorus
- Species: R. spelaeus

Binomial name
- Rhacophorus spelaeus Orlov, Gnophanxay, Phimminith, and Phomphoumy, 2010

Species of frog

Rhacophorus spelaeus, the cave-dwelling tree frog, is a species of frog in the family Rhacophoridae. Scientists know it exclusively from the type locality, a limestone cave in Laos, 140 meters above sea level.

== Original description ==
- Orlov NL; Gnophanxay S; Phimminith T; Phomphoumy K (2010). "A new species of Rhacophorus (Amphibia: Anura: Rhacophoridae:Rhacophorinae) from Khammouan Province, Lao PDR". Russian J Herpetology. 16: 295–303.
