= Rhacophorus hoabinhensis =

Conservation status
- Data Deficient (IUCN 3.1)

Scientific classification
- Kingdom: Animalia
- Phylum: Chordata
- Class: Amphibia
- Order: Anura
- Family: Rhacophoridae
- Genus: Rhacophorus
- Species: R. hoabinhensis

Binomial name
- Rhacophorus hoabinhensis Nguyen, Pham, Nguyen, Ninh, and Ziegler, 2017

Species of frog

Rhacophorus hoabinhensis, the Hoa Binh tree frog, is a species of frog in the family Rhacophoridae. It is endemic to Vietnam. Scientists know it exclusively from the locality of Hang Kia–Pa Co Nature Reserve, 1350 meters above sea level.

The adult male frog measures 31.1–32.5 mm in snout-vent length. The skin of the dorsum is gray-yellow with brown spots. The undersides of the head, neck, and belly are cream. The upper parts of the back legs and lower side of the front legs are orange.
