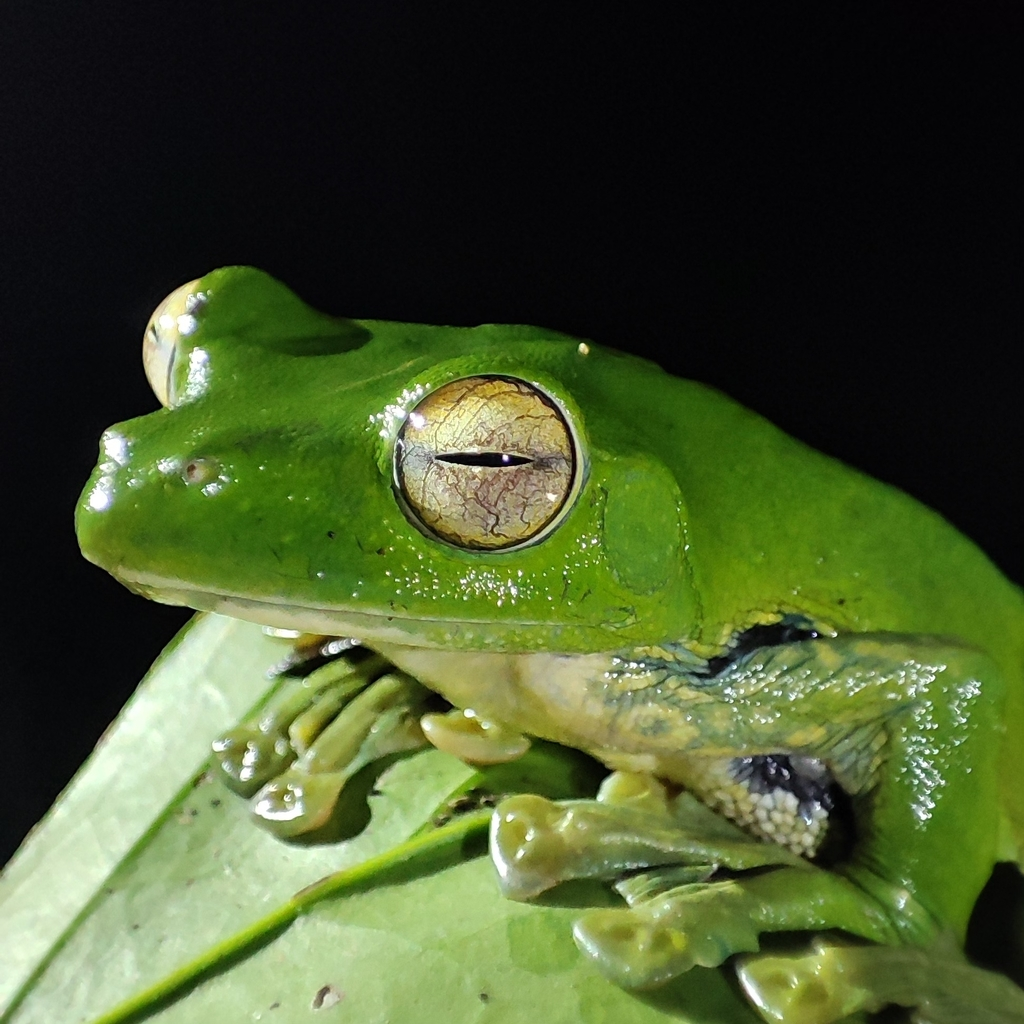

Conservation status
- Endangered (IUCN 3.1)

Scientific classification
- Kingdom: Animalia
- Phylum: Chordata
- Class: Amphibia
- Order: Anura
- Family: Rhacophoridae
- Genus: Rhacophorus
- Species: R. helenae

Binomial name
- Rhacophorus helenae Rowley, Tran, Hoang & Le, 2012

= Rhacophorus helenae =

Species of amphibian

Rhacophorus helenae, commonly called Helen’s flying treefrog, is a flying frog found in low-lying forests of southern Vietnam, from Nui Ong Nature Reserve, Bình Thuận Province to jungle in Tân Phú District, Đồng Nai. The common name is an honorific for Helen M. Rowley, the mother of co-describer Jodi Rowley.

This frog has a body length of about 72–86 mm (2.8–3.4 in) in males and 89–91 mm (3.5–3.6 in) in females. The back and head are green or blue with white spots. Its belly and eyes are white, and has webbed hands and feet which help this frog to glide from tree to tree, and occasionally from the canopy to the ground to breed. This frog is under threat due to the large human population.
