= Rhacophorus larissae =

Conservation status
- Data Deficient (IUCN 3.1)

Scientific classification
- Kingdom: Animalia
- Phylum: Chordata
- Class: Amphibia
- Order: Anura
- Family: Rhacophoridae
- Genus: Rhacophorus
- Species: R. larissae

Binomial name
- Rhacophorus larissae Ostroshabov, Orlov, and Nguyen, 2013

Species of frog

Rhacophorus larissae, the Cao Bang tree frog, is a species of frog in the family Rhacophoridae. Scientists know it exclusively from the exactly one place: Lung Muoi in Vietnam's Cao Bang Province, approximately 1400 meters above sea level.

== Original description ==
- Ostroshabov AA; Orlov NL; Nguyen TT (2013). "Taxonomy of frogs of genus Rhacophorus of "hoanglienensis-orlovi" complex". Russian J Herpetol (Abstract). 20 (4): 301–324.
