= Rhacophorus orlovi =

- Male specimen of Rhacophorus orlovi

Conservation status
- Least Concern (IUCN 3.1)

Scientific classification
- Kingdom: Animalia
- Phylum: Chordata
- Class: Amphibia
- Order: Anura
- Family: Rhacophoridae
- Genus: Rhacophorus
- Species: R. orlovi

Binomial name
- Rhacophorus orlovi Ziegler & J. Köhler, 2001

Species of frog

Rhacophorus orlovi is a species of frog in the family Rhacophoridae. The species is endemic to Southeast Asia.

== Etymology ==
The specific name, orlovi, is in honor of Russian herpetologist Nikolai Liutsianovich Orlov.

== Geographic range ==
Rhacophorus orlovi is found in Laos, Thailand, and Vietnam.

== Habitat ==
The natural habitats of Rhacophorus orlovi are subtropical or tropical moist lowland forests, rivers, freshwater marshes, and intermittent freshwater marshes, at elevations of 90–800 m (300–2,620 ft).

== Conservation status ==
Rhacophorus orlovi is threatened by habitat loss.
