= Rhacophorus exechopygus =

Conservation status
- Least Concern (IUCN 3.1)

Scientific classification
- Kingdom: Animalia
- Phylum: Chordata
- Class: Amphibia
- Order: Anura
- Family: Rhacophoridae
- Genus: Rhacophorus
- Species: R. exechopygus

Binomial name
- Rhacophorus exechopygus Inger, Orlov, and Darevsky, 1999

Species of frog

Rhacophorus exechopygus is a species of frog in the family Rhacophoridae. It is found in the Central Highlands of Vietnam and in the adjacent Annamite Range in Laos. Its range may extend into northeastern Cambodia where suitable habitat should be present. The specific name exechopygus is derived from the Greek words exechos (=jutting out) and pygos (=buttocks), referring to the infra-anal projection characteristic of this frog. Its common names are spinybottom tree frog and Tramlap flying tree frog.

== Description ==
Adult males measure 43–47 mm (1.7–1.9 in) and adult females about 59 mm (2.3 in) in snout–vent length. The overall appearance is stocky. There is a strong, wide, white-edged, horizontal infra-anal dermal projection. The snout is pointed. The tympanum is distinct. The fingers have well-developed discs and extensive webbing. The toe discs are smaller than those of fingers; the toes are fully webbed. The dorsum is uniformly gray to brown above, but sometimes with obscure dark blotch at rear of head. The limbs have brown or reddish brown crossbars.

== Habitat and conservation ==
Natural habitats of Rhacophorus exechopygus are evergreen forests, including those mixed with bamboo or deciduous forest, typically on vegetation near streams, at elevations of 510–1,250 m (1,670–4,100 ft) above sea level. The eggs are deposited in foam nests attached to leaves overhanging the water surface. It is threatened by habitat loss and degradation, mainly caused by agriculture. Collection for international pet trade might also be a threat. It is present in a number of protected areas including the Phong Nha-Kẻ Bàng National Park and Ngọc Linh and Song Thanh Nature Reserves (Vietnam). Its expected range includes other protected areas too.
