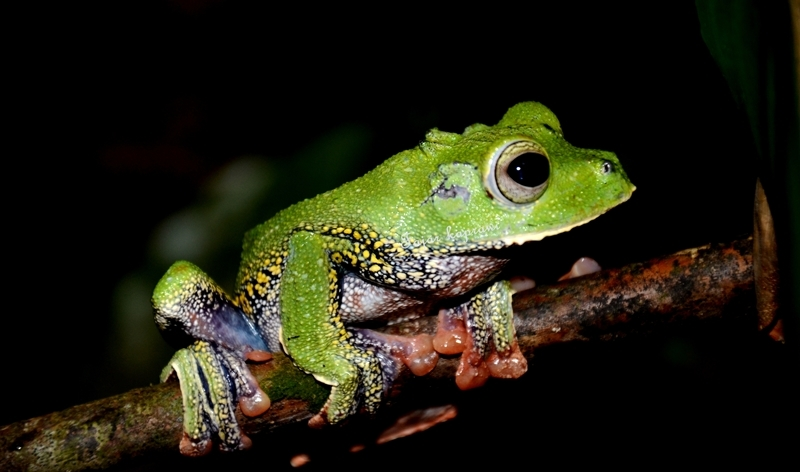
- R. georgii in Indonesia

Conservation status
- Least Concern (IUCN 3.1)

Scientific classification
- Kingdom: Animalia
- Phylum: Chordata
- Class: Amphibia
- Order: Anura
- Family: Rhacophoridae
- Genus: Rhacophorus
- Species: R. georgii

Binomial name
- Rhacophorus georgii Roux, 1904

= Rhacophorus georgii =

Species of amphibian

Rhacophorus georgii (common name: Tuwa flying frog) is a species of flying frog in the family Rhacophoridae endemic to Sulawesi, Indonesia. Its type locality ("Tuwa, Paluthal, West-Central Celebes") cannot be located, but it has recently been collected from Buton, off southeastern Sulawesi.

Rhacophorus georgii live in lowland forests, below 800 m (2,600 ft) asl. These frogs attach foamy egg masses to the trunks of trees, 1–3 cm above water-filled tree cavities; each female can carry 29–108 eggs. Upon hatching, tadpoles fall to these water-filled cavities.

Specific threats to this species are unknown but it is probably negatively affected by habitat loss.
