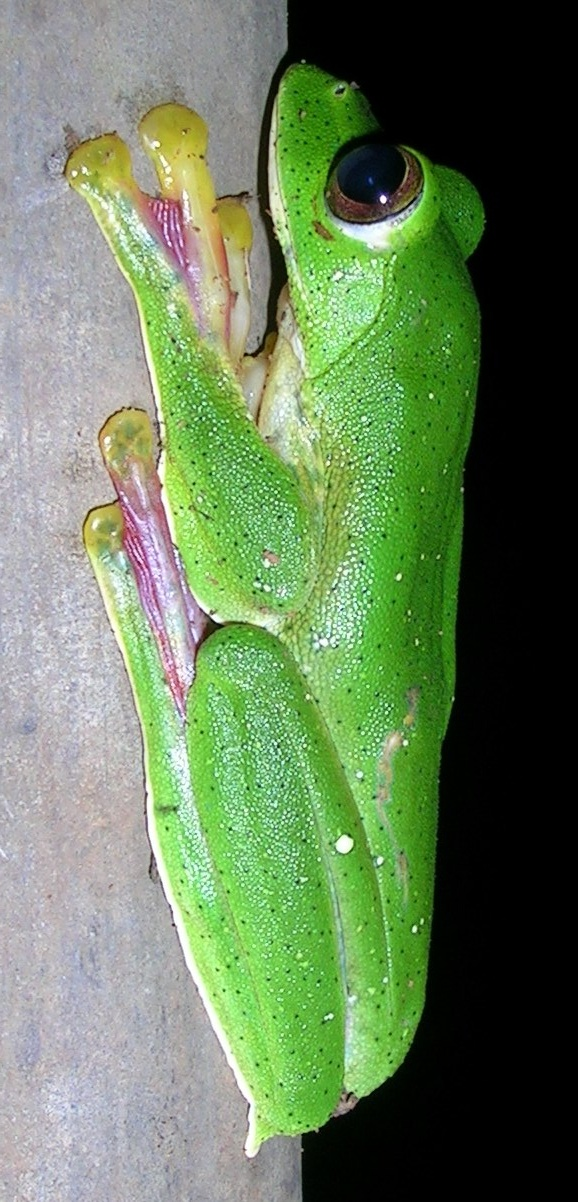
- Malabar gliding frog (Rhacophorus malabaricus); Note the elongated toes with prominent webbing.

Scientific classification
- Kingdom: Animalia
- Phylum: Chordata
- Class: Amphibia
- Order: Anura
- Family: Rhacophoridae
- Subfamily: Rhacophorinae
- Genus: Rhacophorus; Kuhl & Van Hasselt, 1822

Species
- See text

Synonyms
- Rhacoforus Palacky, 1898 (lapsus); Racophorus Schlegel, 1826 (lapsus)

= Rhacophorus =

Genus of amphibians

Rhacophorus is a genus of frogs in the shrub-frog family Rhacophoridae, which, with the related Hylidae, is one of the two genera of true tree frogs. They are found in China, India, Japan, and throughout Southeast Asia, including the island of Borneo. Over 40 species are currently recognised.

These frogs have long toes with strong webbing between them, enabling the animals to jump from tree to tree, using the webbing to control a gliding descent, a form of arboreal locomotion known as parachuting. This behavioral adaptation is the source of their common name, "flying frogs".

The present genus is closely related to Polypedates, which (formerly) was included in Rhacophorus. Even today, it is not fully agreed upon which of these genera "P." feae and the Chinese flying frog ("R." dennysi) properly belong to; furthermore, a supposedly new species, "P. pingbianensis", has been found to be the same as R. duboisi.

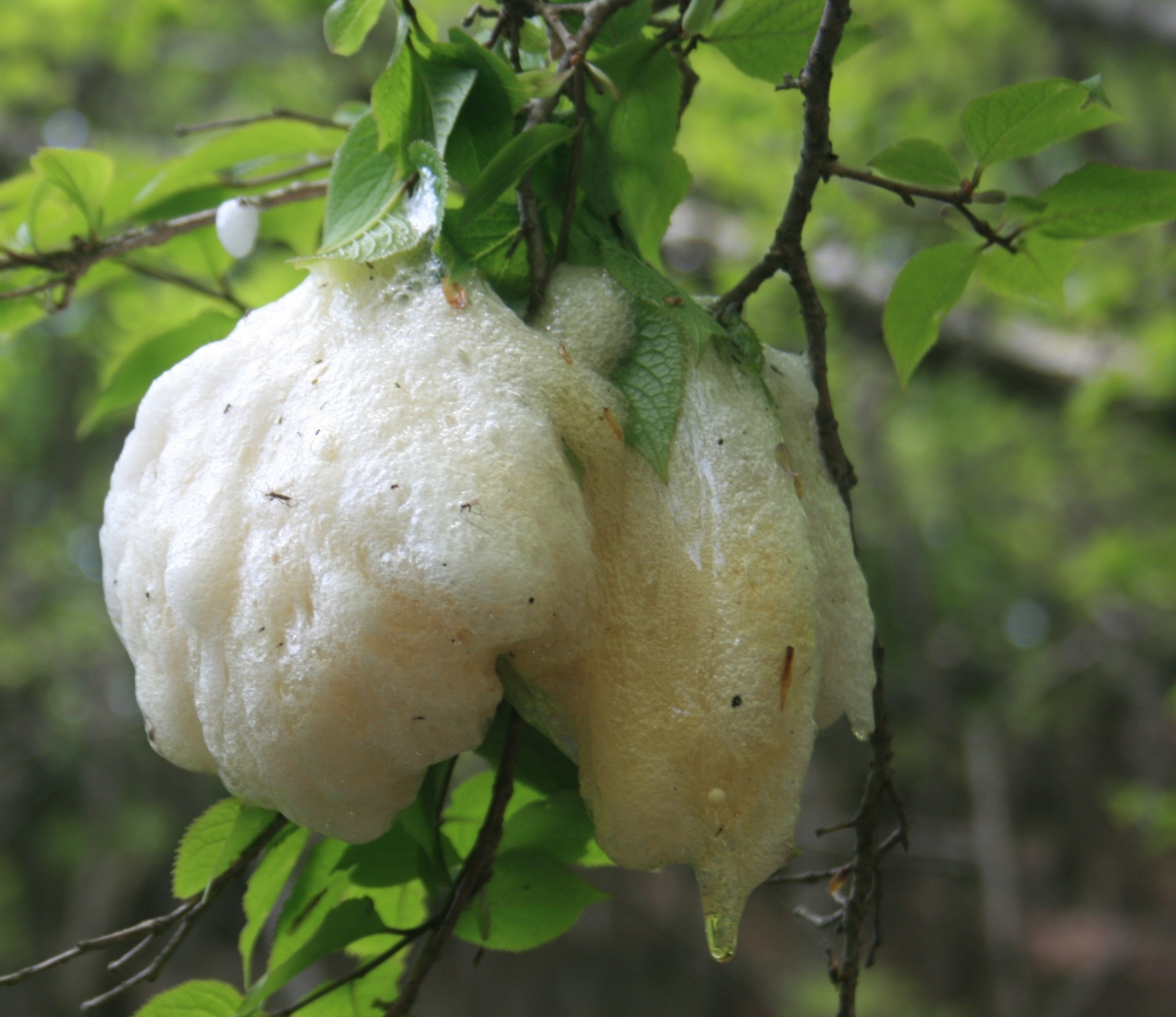
Foam nest of Rhacophorus arboreus

== Reproduction ==
These frogs lay their eggs in aerial foam nests; upon hatching, tadpoles drop to the water under the nest and complete their development there. Some species like Rhacophorus kio will wrap this and cover this foam nest with leaves.

== Species ==
These species are recognised in the genus Rhacophorus:

- Rhacophorus annamensis Smith, 1924 – Annam flying frog
- Rhacophorus baluensis Inger, 1954
- Rhacophorus barisani Harvey, Pemberton, and Smith, 2002
- Rhacophorus bengkuluensis Streicher, Hamidy, Harvey, Anders, Shaney, Kurniawan, and Smith, 2014
- Rhacophorus bifasciatus Van Kampen, 1923
- Rhacophorus bipunctatus Ahl, 1927 (including R. htunwini)
- Rhacophorus borneensis Matsui, Shimada, and Sudin, 2013
- Rhacophorus calcadensis Ahl, 1927 – Kalakad gliding frog
- Rhacophorus calcaneus Smith, 1924
- Rhacophorus catamitus Harvey, Pemberton, and Smith, 2002
- Rhacophorus edentulus Müller, 1894
- Rhacophorus exechopygus Inger, Orlov, and Darevsky, 1999
- Rhacophorus georgii Roux, 1904
- Rhacophorus helenae Rowley, Tran, Hoang & Le, 2012 – Helen's tree frog
- Rhacophorus hoabinhensis Nguyen, Pham, Nguyen, Ninh, and Ziegler, 2017
- Rhacophorus hoanglienensis Orlov, Lathrop, Murphy, and Ho, 2001
- Rhacophorus indonesiensis Hamidy & Kurniati, 2015
- Rhacophorus kio Ohler & Delorme, 2005 – black-webbed treefrog
- Rhacophorus laoshan Mo, Jiang, Xie, and Ohler, 2008
- Rhacophorus larissae Ostroshabov, Orlov, and Nguyen, 2013
- Rhacophorus lateralis Boulenger, 1883
- Rhacophorus malabaricus Jerdon, 1870 – Malabar gliding frog
- Rhacophorus margaritifer (Schlegel, 1837)
- Rhacophorus marmoridorsum Orlov, 2008
- Rhacophorus modestus Boulenger, 1920
- Rhacophorus monticola Boulenger, 1896
- Rhacophorus napoensis Li, Liu, Yu, and Sun, 2022
- Rhacophorus nigropalmatus Boulenger, 1895 – Wallace's flying frog
- Rhacophorus norhayatii Chan and Grismer, 2010
- Rhacophorus orlovi Ziegler and Köhler, 2001
- Rhacophorus pardalis Günther, 1858 – harlequin tree frog
- Rhacophorus poecilonotus Boulenger, 1920
- Rhacophorus pseudomalabaricus Vasudevan and Dutta, 2000
- Rhacophorus reinwardtii (Schlegel, 1840) – black-webbed tree frog, green flying frog, Reinwardt's tree frog
- Rhacophorus rhodopus Liu and Hu, 1960 (including R. namdaphaensis, often included in R. bipunctatus)
- Rhacophorus robertingeri Orlov, Poyarkov, Vassilieva, Ananjeva, Nguyen, Sang, and Geissler, 2012
- Rhacophorus spelaeus Orlov, Gnophanxay, Phimminith, and Phomphoumy, 2010
- Rhacophorus subansiriensis Mathew and Sen, 2009
- Rhacophorus trangdinhensis Kropachev, Evsyunin, Orlov, and Nguyen, 2022
- Rhacophorus translineatus Wu, 1977
- Rhacophorus tuberculatus (Anderson, 1871)
- Rhacophorus turpes Smith, 1940
- Rhacophorus vanbanicus Kropachev, Orlov, Ninh, and Nguyen, 2019
- Rhacophorus verrucopus Huang, 1983
- Rhacophorus viridimaculatus Ostroshabov, Orlov, and Nguyen, 2013

== Phylogeny ==
The following is a partial phylogeny of Rhacophorus from Pyron & Wiens (2011). Only nine species are included. Rhacophorus is a sister group of Polypedates.

- Rhacophorus
  - - - - - Rhacophorus annamensis
          - Rhacophorus orlovi
        - - Rhacophorus malabaricus
          - Rhacophorus calcaneus
      - - Rhacophorus rhodopus
        - - Rhacophorus bipunctatus
          - - Rhacophorus kio
            - - Rhacophorus reinwardtii
              - Rhacophorus lateralis
