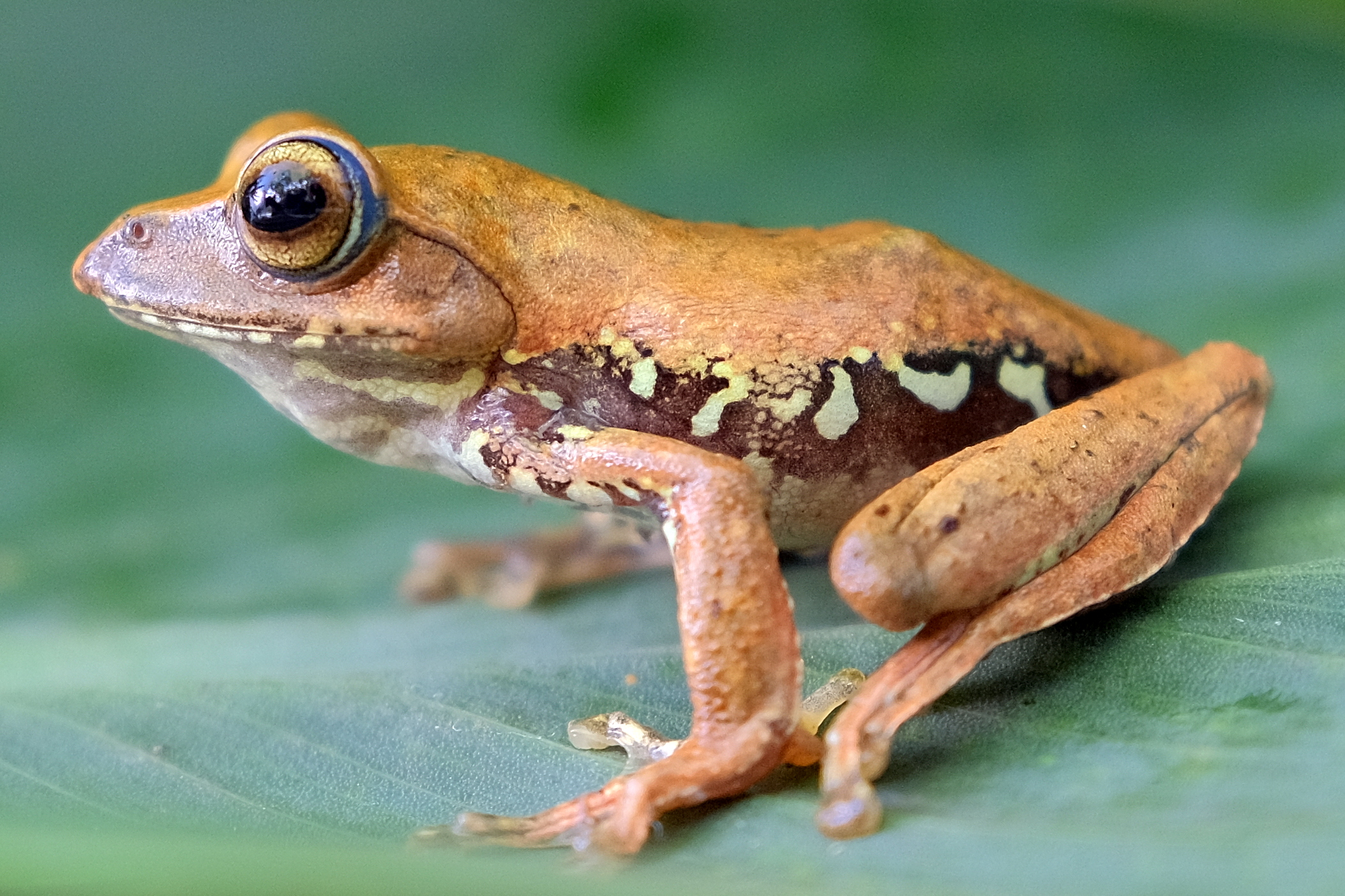

Conservation status
- Vulnerable (IUCN 3.1)

Scientific classification
- Kingdom: Animalia
- Phylum: Chordata
- Class: Amphibia
- Order: Anura
- Family: Rhacophoridae
- Genus: Rhacophorus
- Species: R. monticola

Binomial name
- Rhacophorus monticola Boulenger, 1896

= Rhacophorus monticola =

Species of frog

Rhacophorus monticola is a species of frog in the family Rhacophoridae endemic to Sulawesi, Indonesia. Its natural habitats are subtropical or tropical moist montane forests and rivers. It is threatened by habitat loss.
