= Rhacophorus vanbanicus =

Conservation status
- Vulnerable (IUCN 3.1)

Scientific classification
- Kingdom: Animalia
- Phylum: Chordata
- Class: Amphibia
- Order: Anura
- Family: Rhacophoridae
- Genus: Rhacophorus
- Species: R. vanbanicus

Binomial name
- Rhacophorus vanbanicus Kropachev, Orlov, Ninh, and Nguyen, 2019

Synonyms
- Rhacophorus vanbaensis Poyarkov, Nguyen, Popov, Geissler, Pawangkhanant, Neang, Suwannapoom, and Orlov, 2021

Species of frog

Rhacophorus vanbanicus, the Van Ban treefrog, is a frog. It is endemic to Vietnam. Scientists know it exclusively from the type locality, 900 meters above sea level in the Van Ban District. It is suspected in China's Yunnan Province.

== Original publication ==
- Kropachev II; Orlov NL; Ninh HT; Nguyen TT (2019). "A new species of Rhacophorus genus (Amphibia: Anura: Rhacophoridae: Rhacophorinae) from Van Ban District, Lao Cai Province, northern Viernam". Russian J Herpetology. 26: 325–334.
