= Rhacophorus marmoridorsum =

Conservation status
- Vulnerable (IUCN 3.1)

Scientific classification
- Kingdom: Animalia
- Phylum: Chordata
- Class: Amphibia
- Order: Anura
- Family: Rhacophoridae
- Genus: Rhacophorus
- Species: R. marmoridorsum

Binomial name
- Rhacophorus marmoridorsum Orlov, 2008

Species of frog

Rhacophorus marmoridorsum, the marbled flying tree frog, is a species of frog in the family Rhacophoridae. It is endemic to Vietnam, where it has been observed in streams approximately 1000 meters above sea level.
