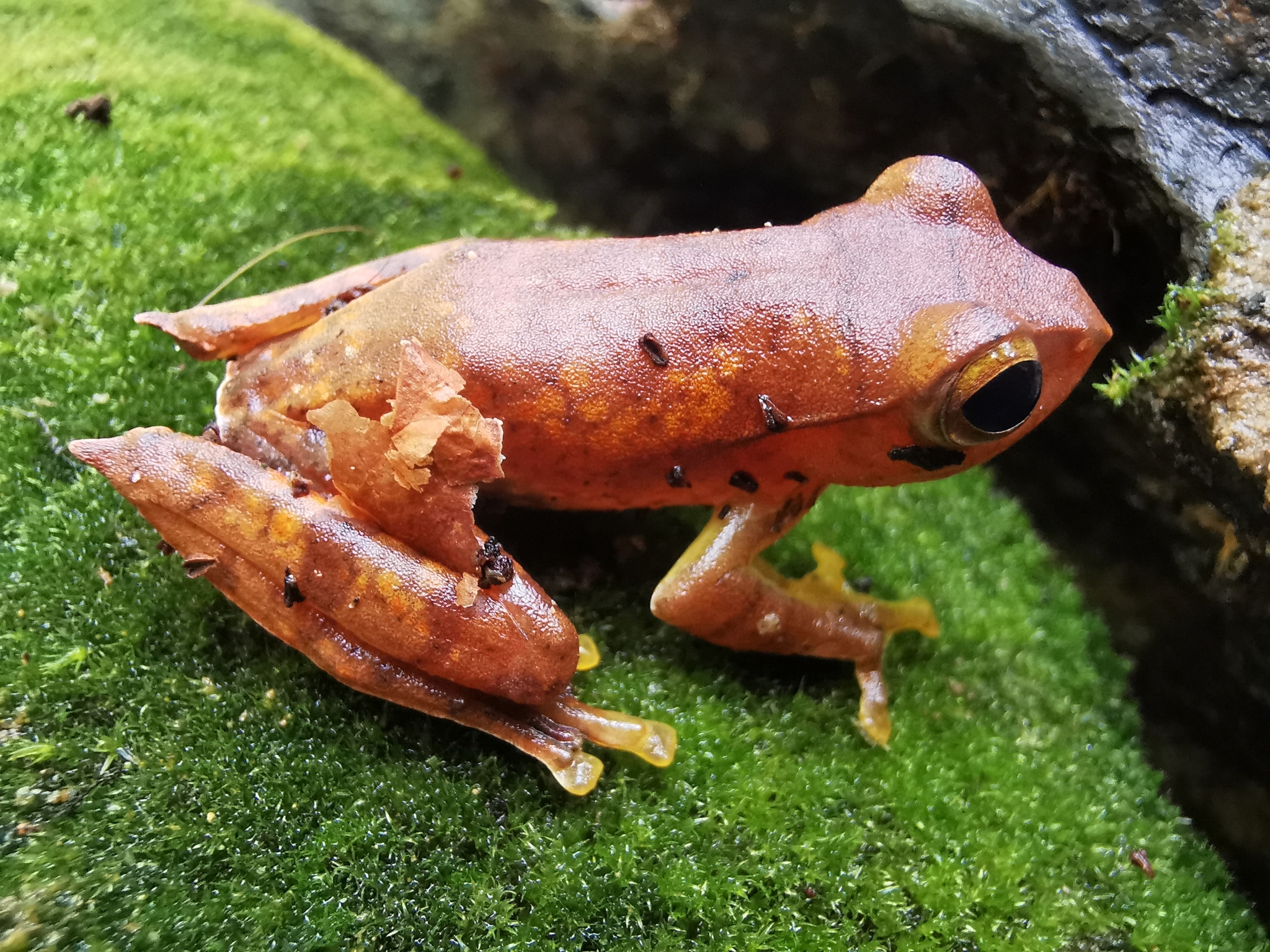

Conservation status
- Least Concern (IUCN 3.1)

Scientific classification
- Kingdom: Animalia
- Phylum: Chordata
- Class: Amphibia
- Order: Anura
- Family: Rhacophoridae
- Genus: Rhacophorus
- Species: R. robertingeri

Binomial name
- Rhacophorus robertingeri Orlov, Poyarkov, Vassilieva, Ananjeva, Nguyen, Sang, and Geissler, 2012

= Rhacophorus robertingeri =

Species of amphibian

Rhacophorus robertingeri is a species of frog in the family Rhacophoridae endemic to Vietnam. First found in the Annamite Mountains of Vietnam, it is now known from mountain areas between Hà Giang or Nghệ An Province in the north and Gia Lai or Bình Thuận Province in the south, depending on the source. This species can be differentiated from its congeners based on the pointed projection at the tibiotarsal articulation, as well as coloration.

== Etymology ==
The specific name robertingeri honors Robert F. Inger, famous American zoologist from the Field Museum of Natural History.

== Description ==
Adult males measure 36–44 mm (1.4–1.7 in) and females 49–58 mm (1.9–2.3 in) in snout–vent length. The habitus is stocky with relatively large and broad head. The snout is sharply pointed. The tympanum is distinct. The fingers have large discs; those of the toes are smaller. Basal webbing is present. Dorsal skin is generally smooth. The dorsum has variable color and patterning. The coloration is dominated by yellow-and red-brown tones. There are orange, cream, white and dark brown spots. The ventrum is can be light gray, cream, or ivory color. It may be immaculate or have pronounced.

== Habitat and conservation ==
Rhacophorus robertingeri inhabits dense evergreen forests at elevations of 400–1,700 m (1,300–5,600 ft) above sea level. It is associated with montane streams. Peak reproductive season is March–June and October–November. Males call diurnally but amplexus takes places only after dusk. The pair constructs a foam nest in leaves hanging near water. Upon hatching, the tadpoles fall down and enter the stream.

Habitat loss through deforestation is likely a threat to this species. It occurs in many protected areas: A Yun Pa Proposed Nature Reserve, Kon Cha Rang Nature Reserve, Kon Ka Kinh National Park, Ngoch Linh Nature Reserve, Ba Na-Nui Chua Nature Reserve, Nui Ong Nature Reserve, and Bạch Mã National Park.
