= Rhacophorus catamitus =

Conservation status
- Least Concern (IUCN 3.1)

Scientific classification
- Kingdom: Animalia
- Phylum: Chordata
- Class: Amphibia
- Order: Anura
- Family: Rhacophoridae
- Genus: Rhacophorus
- Species: R. catamitus

Binomial name
- Rhacophorus catamitus Harvey, Pemberton, and Smith, 2002

Species of amphibian

Rhacophorus catamitus is a species of frogs in the family Rhacophoridae. It is endemic to Sumatra, Indonesia, and occurs in the Barisan Mountains at elevations of 1,068–1,680 m (3,504–5,512 ft) above sea level. Its natural habitats are tropical forests. Males call from low vegetation near streams. It is probably impacted by habitat loss.
