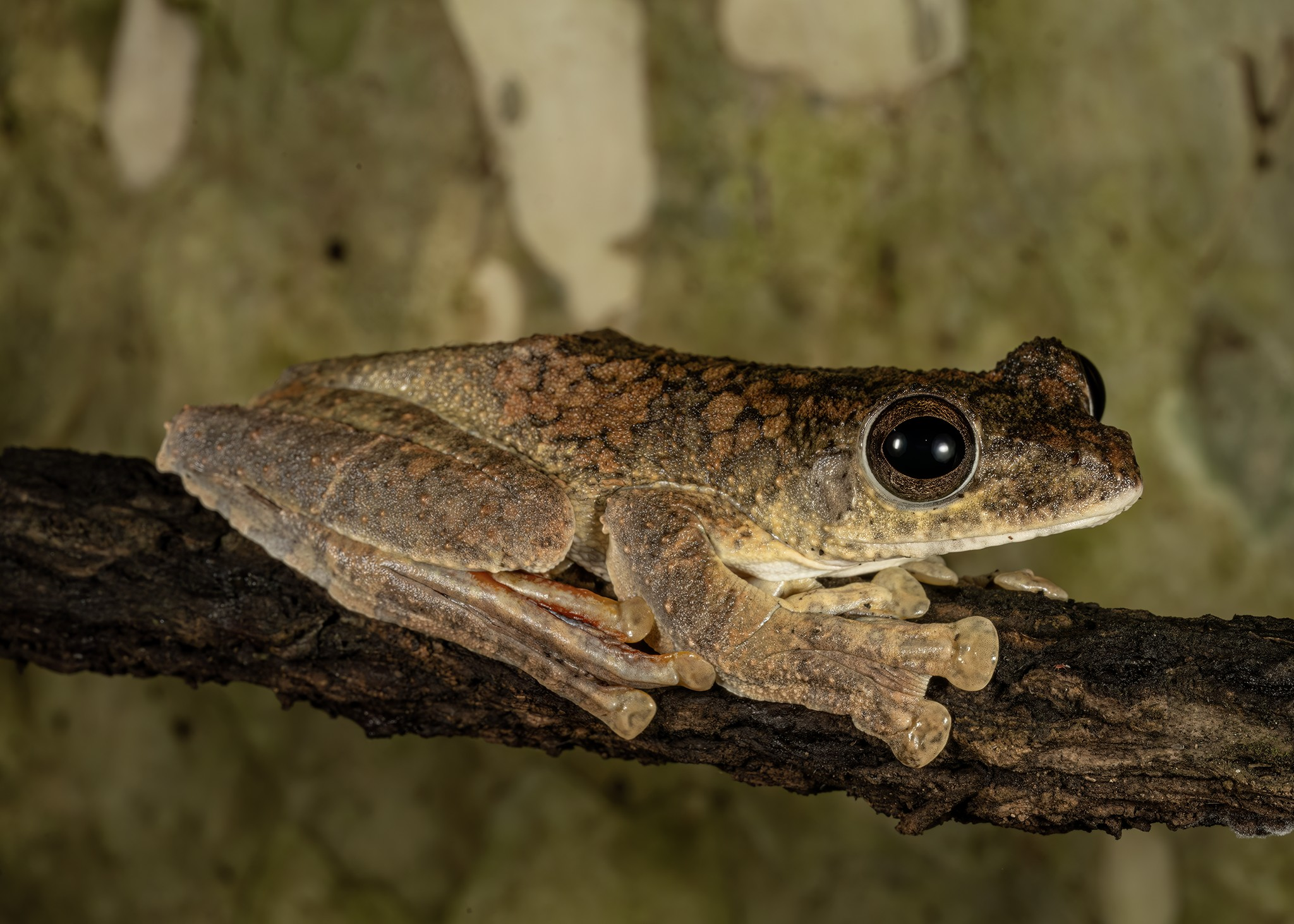

Conservation status
- Least Concern (IUCN 3.1)

Scientific classification
- Kingdom: Animalia
- Phylum: Chordata
- Class: Amphibia
- Order: Anura
- Family: Rhacophoridae
- Genus: Rhacophorus
- Species: R. annamensis

Binomial name
- Rhacophorus annamensis Smith, 1924

Synonyms
- Rhacophorus notater Smith, 1924

= Rhacophorus annamensis =

Species of amphibian

Rhacophorus annamensis is a species of frog in the family Rhacophoridae found in the Annamite Mountains in Cambodia and Vietnam. Its natural habitats are subtropical or tropical moist lowland forest, subtropical or tropical moist montane forest, and rivers. It is threatened by habitat loss. The females of this species are somewhat larger, at around 4.0 in (10 cm). This frog is usually a light gray color, but can also be brown or a dark red color, and in some cases bright yellow.
