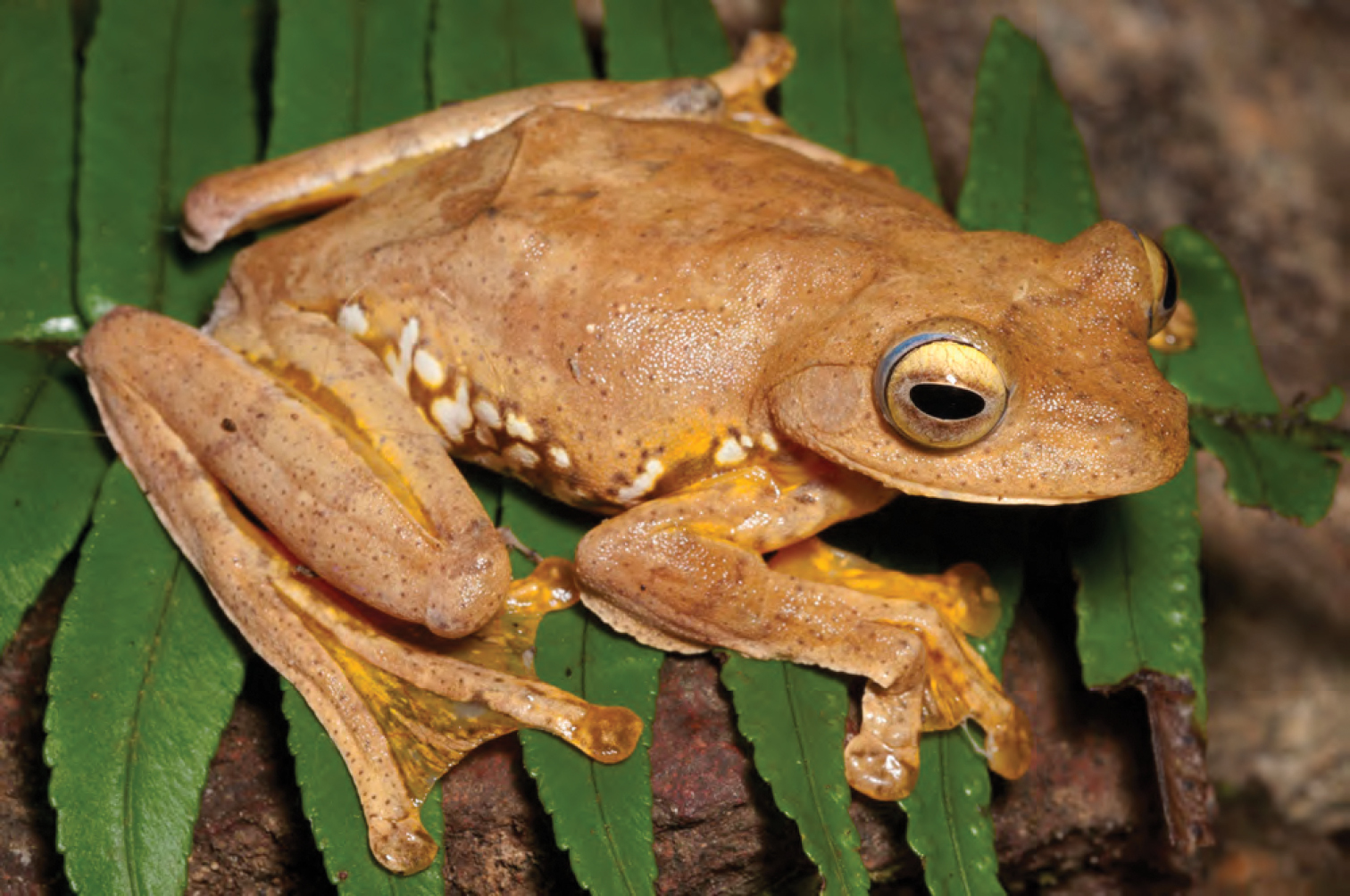
- Female from Luzon Island, Philippines

Conservation status
- Least Concern (IUCN 3.1)

Scientific classification
- Kingdom: Animalia
- Phylum: Chordata
- Class: Amphibia
- Order: Anura
- Family: Rhacophoridae
- Genus: Rhacophorus
- Species: R. pardalis

Binomial name
- Rhacophorus pardalis Günther, 1858

Synonyms
- Rhacophorus rizali Boettger, 1899; Rhacophorus rhyssocephalus Wolf, 1936

= Harlequin tree frog =

Species of amphibian

The harlequin tree frog (Rhacophorus pardalis) is a species of frog in the family Rhacophoridae found in Brunei, Indonesia, Malaysia, Thailand, and the Philippines. Its natural habitats are subtropical or tropical moist lowland forest, subtropical or tropical moist montane forest, freshwater marshes, and intermittent freshwater marshes. It is threatened by habitat loss.
