= Malabar gliding frog =

Conservation status
- Least Concern (IUCN 3.1)

Scientific classification
- Kingdom: Animalia
- Phylum: Chordata
- Class: Amphibia
- Order: Anura
- Family: Rhacophoridae
- Genus: Rhacophorus
- Species: R. malabaricus

Binomial name
- Rhacophorus malabaricus Jerdon, 1870

Species of amphibian

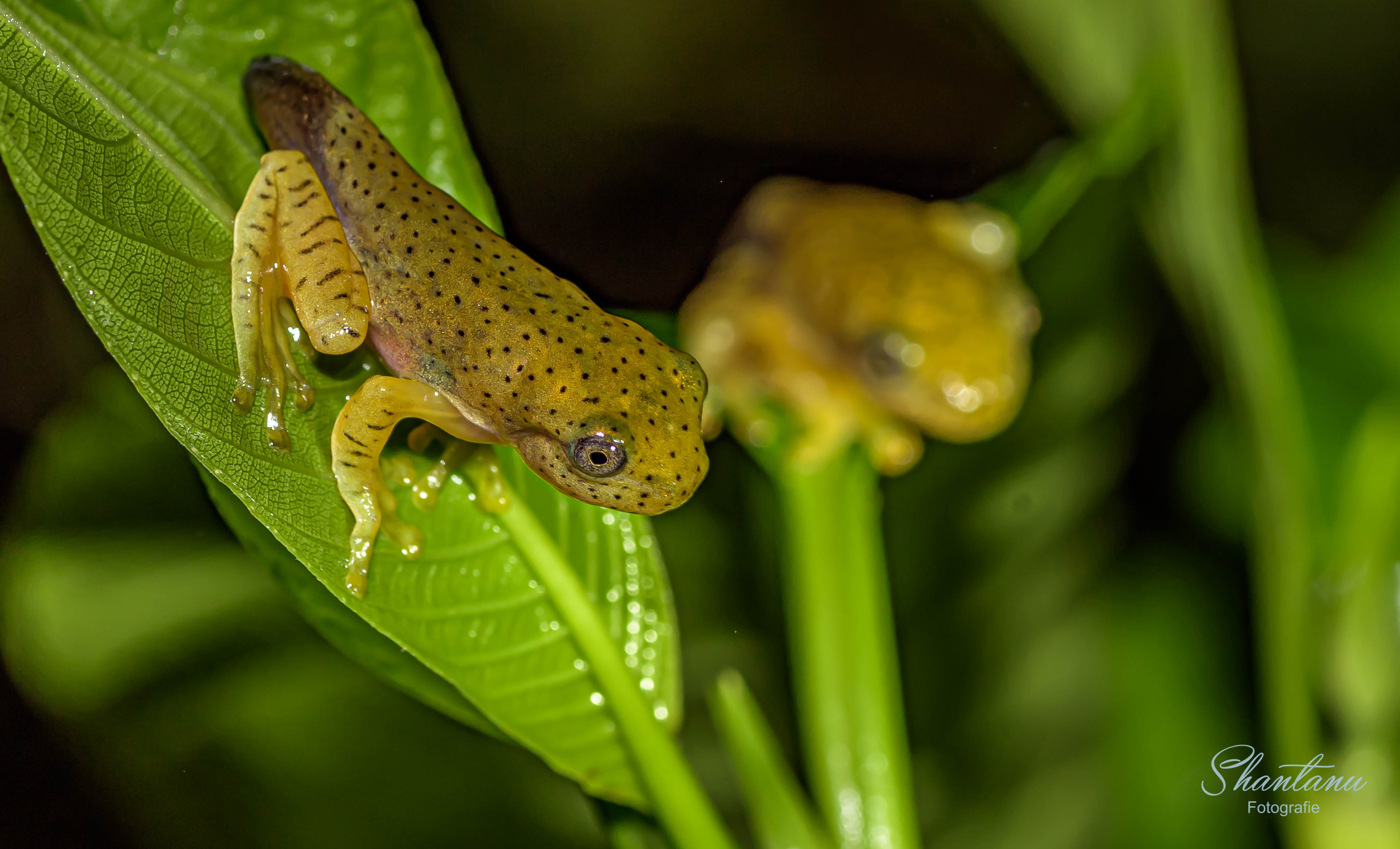
Froglet of Malabar gliding frog. This is the stage between a tadpole and an adult frog. Note the tail.

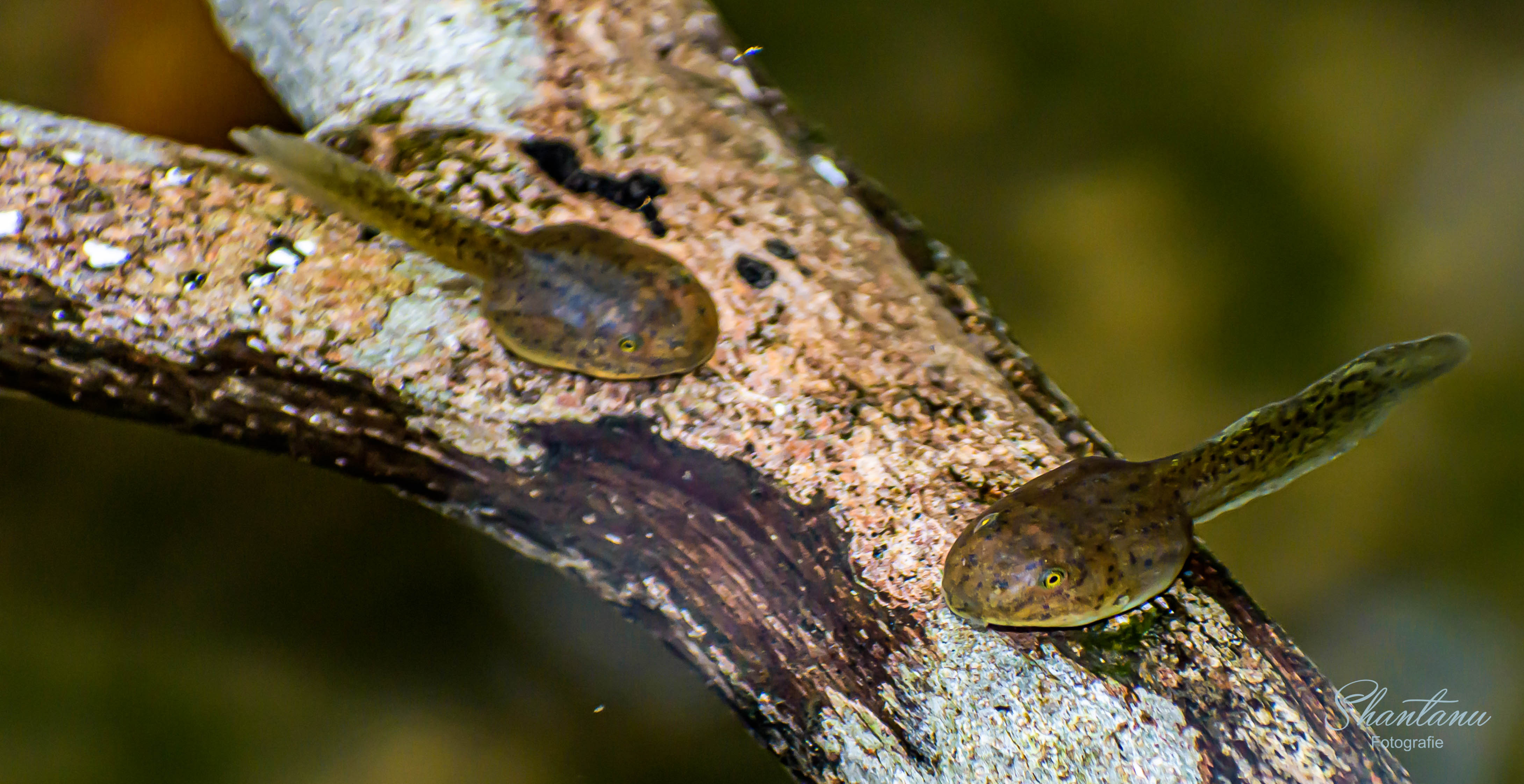
Tadpole of Malabar gliding frog

The Malabar gliding frog or Malabar flying frog (Rhacophorus malabaricus) is a rhacophorid tree frog species found in the Western Ghats of India.

It is the state amphibian of Kerala.

== Pictures ==
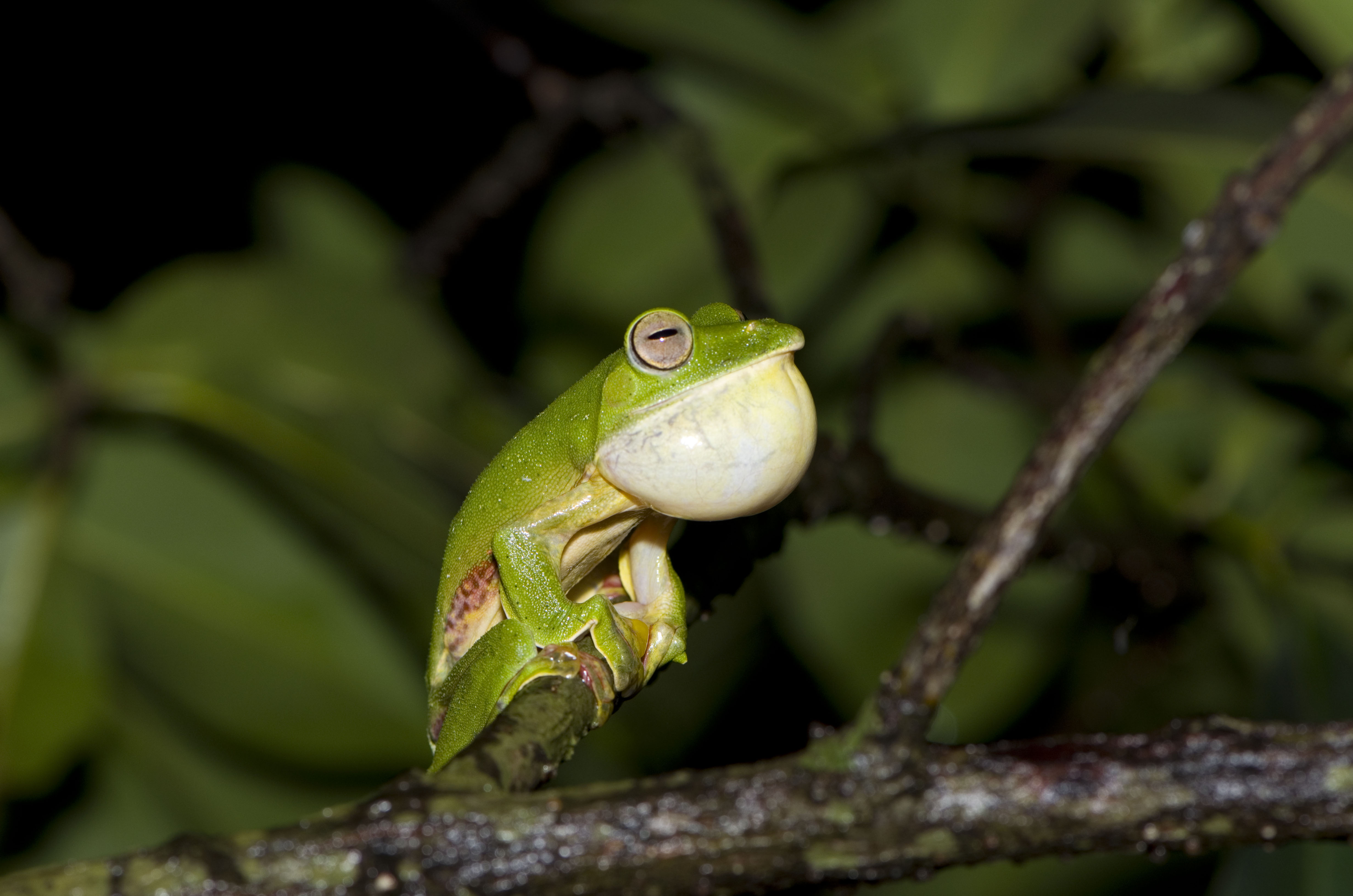
Calling male.

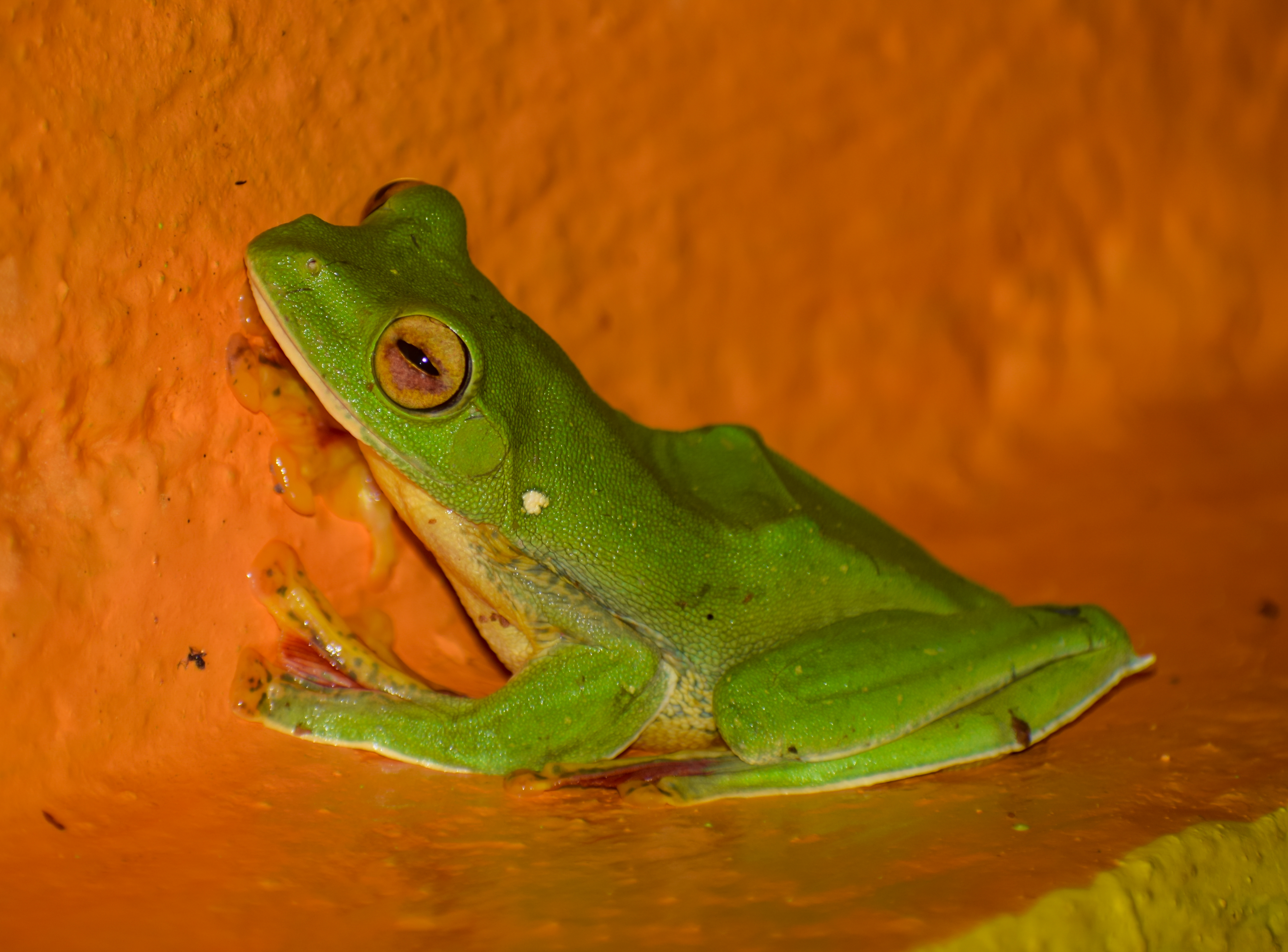
An Adult female Rhacophorus malabaricus resting on the building of a temple in the Bisle Ghats.

The term "gliding" frog refers to its ability to break its fall by stretching the webbing between its toes when making leaps down from the treetops. It can make gliding jumps of 9–12 m, a maximum of about 115 times its length.

== Description ==
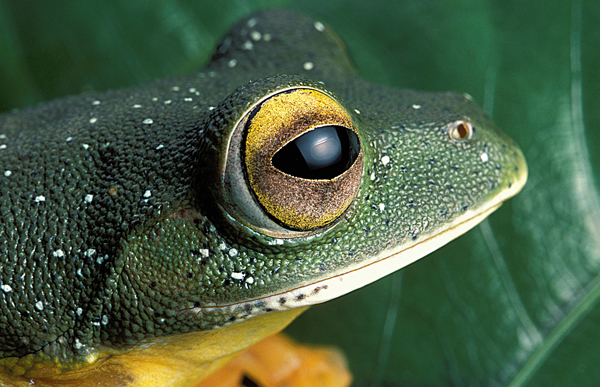
Close-up of snout

This frog has a body length of about 10 cm (4 in), making it one of the largest moss frogs. Males are smaller than females. Its back skin is finely granulated and the color is vivid green without markings, distinguishing it from the otherwise quite similar R. pseudomalabaricus, which has a black-marbled back and was long included in the present species. In preserved specimens, the back turns purplish blue. The belly is more coarsely granulated – particularly under the thighs – and pale yellow. There are skin fringes between and along the long limbs, and a triangular skin extension at the heel. The webbing between fingers and toes is large and orange-red.

The vomerine teeth are arranged in two straight or slightly oblique series touching the inner front edge of the choanae. The snout is rounded but not very wide, about as long as the diameter of the orbit, the canthus rostralis is bluntly-angled, and the loral region is concave. The nostrils are located nearer to the end of the snout than to the eyes. The interorbital space is broader than the upper eyelid. The tympanum measures about 60–70% of the diameter of the eye.

The disks of fingers and toes are large, about the size of the tympanum; the subarticular tubercles are well-developed, also. The tibio-tarsal articulation reaches at least to the eye, at most top the nostril.

== Distribution ==
The Malabar gliding frog is found in the Western Ghats of India and has been described in the states of Tamil Nadu, Karnataka, Goa, Maharashtra and Kerala, where it is the state amphibian. It has been recorded at altitudes ranging from 43m to 1894m above sea level. It is found in various habitats such as primary forests, secondary forests, plantations, and urban habitats. It can be found on leaves of trees near stream or river banks. During the breeding season, they move to trees hanging above water bodies into which their tadpoles drop.

== Reproduction ==
Reproduction in this species typically occurs during the monsoon months of June-September. Males of this species sit by the banks of streams and emit calls to attract females. Females will often approach the focal male, the individual who will mate, and signal him to initiate amplexus. The males whip up the foam in which the females deposit the eggs. Peripheral males have been observed helping build the nests for the female and focal male pairs. After spawning, males will typically leave the female and the clutch and the female will cover the clutch in leaf litter. Nests are typically 78-112mm in length and 68-79mm in width. Number of eggs per clutch varied from 89-206 (N = 5) and individual eggs measured between 2.0-3.2 mm (2.8 ± 0.5 mm, N = 89, single egg clutch). The eggs are unpigmented and off-white in color. The tadpoles drop into the water after hatching.

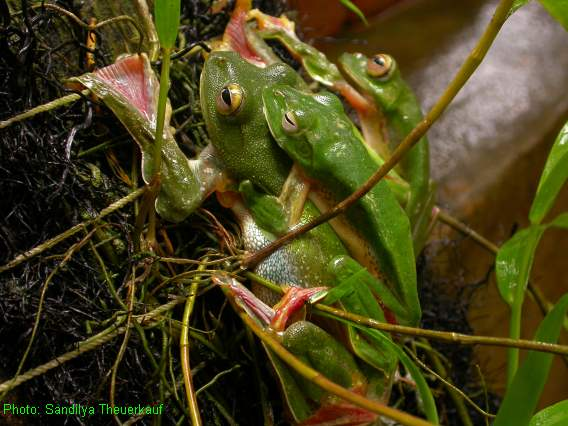
Malabar gliding frogs in amplexus: Note much smaller male on top.

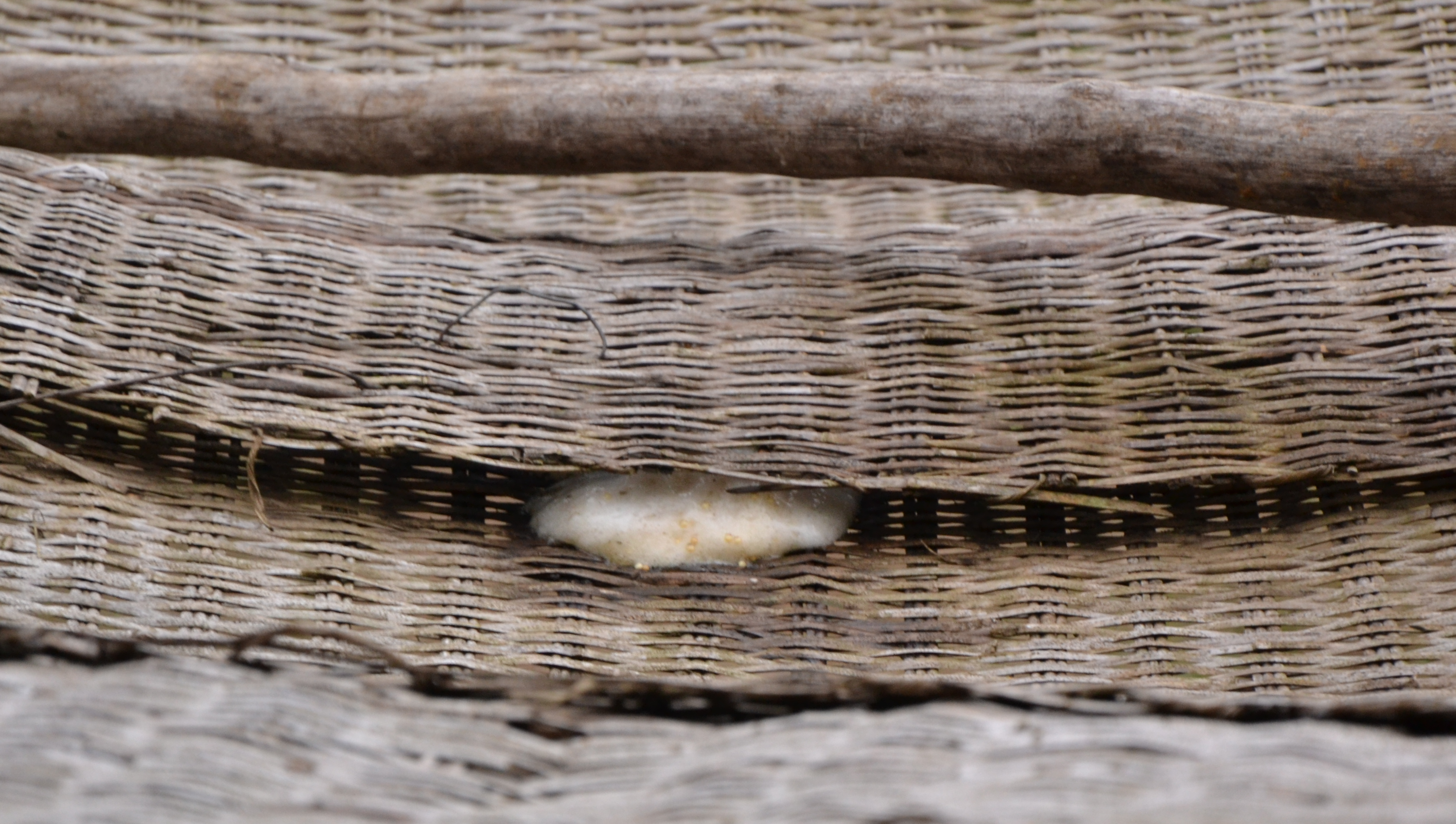
A foam nest built by a gliding frog.

== See also ==
- Flying frog
- Javelin frog
