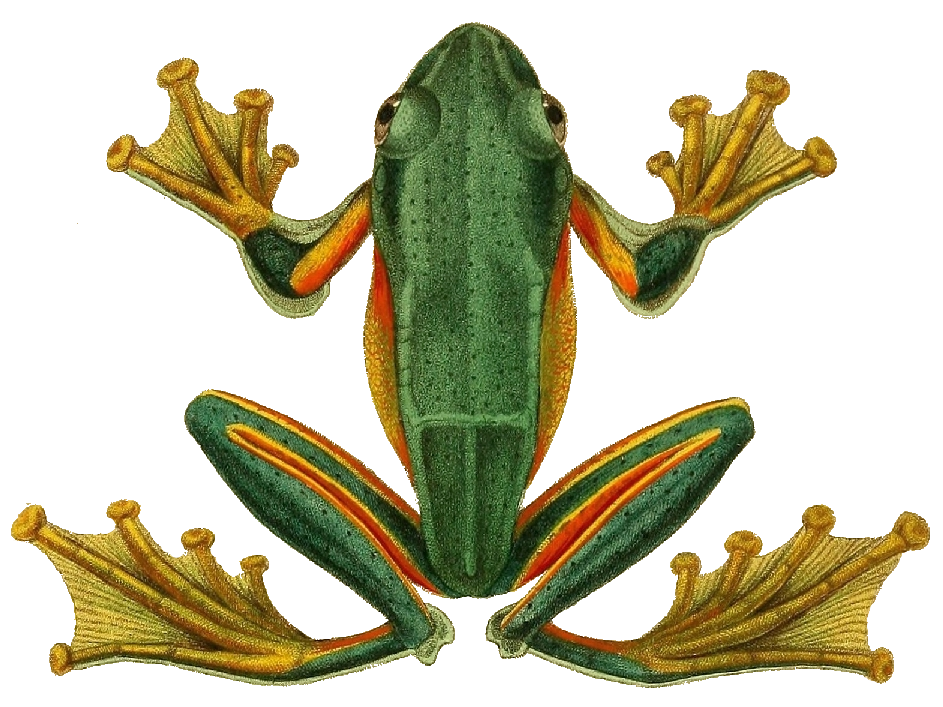

Conservation status
- Least Concern (IUCN 3.1)

Scientific classification
- Kingdom: Animalia
- Phylum: Chordata
- Class: Amphibia
- Order: Anura
- Family: Rhacophoridae
- Genus: Rhacophorus
- Species: R. reinwardtii

Binomial name
- Rhacophorus reinwardtii (Schlegel, 1840)

= Rhacophorus reinwardtii =

Black-webbed tree frog

Species of frog

Rhacophorus reinwardtii is a species of frog in the family Rhacophoridae. It is variously known under the common names of black-webbed treefrog, green flying frog, Reinwardt's flying frog, or Reinwardt's treefrog. Before 2006, Rhacophorus reinwardtii and Rhacophorus kio were considered to be the same species. It is not considered threatened by the IUCN.

== Distribution ==
It is found in China, Indonesia, Laos, Malaysia, Thailand, and Vietnam, and possibly Brunei and Myanmar. Its natural habitats are subtropical or tropical moist lowland forests, subtropical or tropical moist montane forests, freshwater marshes, and intermittent freshwater marshes.

== Morphology ==
The females grow to be larger than the males, to a length of 3.5 in (8.9 cm). They can be either light green or dark green colors and they have black spots around their backs and heads. Males can have more colors on the sides of their abdomens, such as orange, green, purple, black, and yellow. Their eyes can be light green, light yellow, or light grey. They have horizontal pupils.
