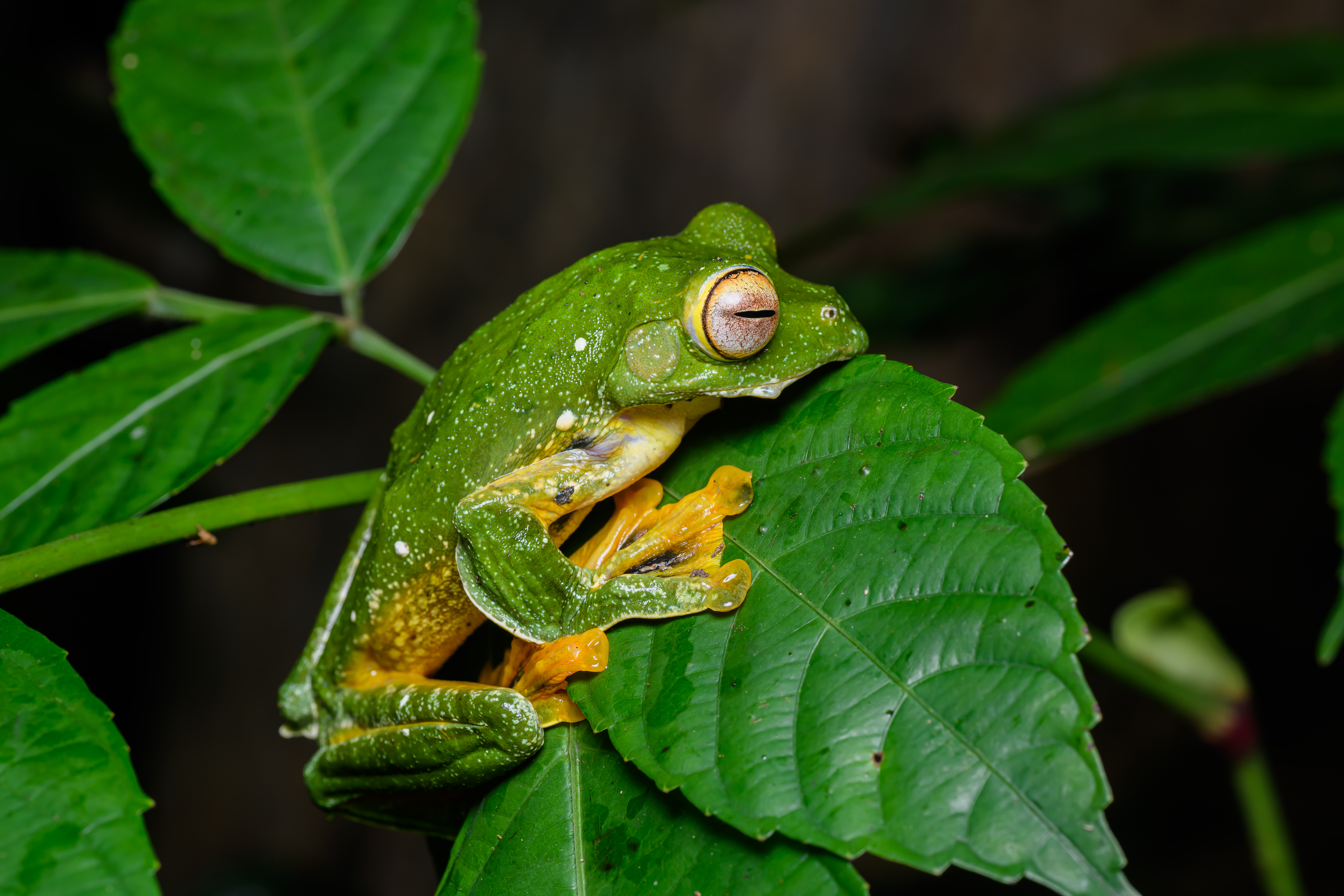
- Rhacophorus kio

Conservation status
- Least Concern (IUCN 3.1)

Scientific classification
- Kingdom: Animalia
- Phylum: Chordata
- Class: Amphibia
- Order: Anura
- Family: Rhacophoridae
- Genus: Rhacophorus
- Species: R. kio

Binomial name
- Rhacophorus kio Ohler and Delorme, 2006

= Rhacophorus kio =

Black-webbed treefrog

Species of amphibian

Rhacophorus kio is a species of flying frog in the family Rhacophoridae and is found in the rainforests of southeast Asia, in countries such as China, Laos, Thailand, and Vietnam. Its ability to glide and its adhesive toe pads make it well adapted to its habitat of the rainforest. Prior to a 2006 study by Annemarie Ohler and Magali Delorme, R. kio and R. reinwardtii were thought to be the same species. The common name black-webbed treefrog can refer to either species. Compared to other frog species in the area, R. kio not only creates a foam nest that holds their eggs, but also creates a structure with leaves that will wrap around the eggs. While the conservation status of the species is currently classified as of least concern by the IUCN Red List, R. kio faces habitat loss from deforestation to make space for agriculture and other human influences.

== Description ==
The tadpoles of Rhacophorus kio are a light olive color with a white colored abdomen. The fins of the tadpole are mainly colorless, with the edges near the tail being a lighter grey color. The body of the tadpole is oval-shaped, widest around the gill area, and displays a rounded snout. In its final stages of development, the tadpole will be around 43 – 52 mm in size.

The size of the adult frog is between 58 – 79 mm which is much larger than Rhacophorus reinwardtii, serving as a way to tell the difference between the two species.

The dorsal side of R. kio is grass green in color with darker green sections, while the lower part of its flanks are a dark brown color. The dorsal side of the frog is marked with white spots while its sides are marked with yellow spots. The ventral side of the frog is yellow in color. The thigh of Rhacophorus kio is grass green with the posterior region possessing an orange-yellow color. There is a distinct and large black spot clearly visible near the armpit regions. Both the toes and fingers of R. kio are webbed and are an orange-yellow color. There is also a black spot in-between each of the toes and fingers.

=== Differences between Rhacophorus kio and R. reinwardtii ===
Rhacophorus kio and R. reinwardtii were thought to be the same species prior to 2006. This is attributed to how difficult the species is to detect when it is not breeding and the relatively small breeding populations of R. kio. These characteristics led to the rarity of the frog species in museum collections, and in turn, less information about these frog species causing these two different species to be classified as one.

Compared to R. reinwardtii, R. kio are larger in size with a greater snout-vent length. However, R. kio have both a narrower and shorter head size. R. kio also have smaller sized toe pads. One of the distinguishing characteristics between the two species is the difference in webbing. For R. kio, the longitudinal lines on the webbing are orange and yellow in color, while for R. reinwardtii these longitudinal lines are of a bluish white color. Additionally, the black spot on the webbing for R. kio is only at the base of the webbing. For R. reinwardtii, the black coloration extends all the way from the base of the webbing to the edges.

== Habitat ==
R. kio are native to the rainforests of south-east Asia, and are found between elevations of 200 m and 1,800 m. They live in the closed-canopy of primary and secondary evergreen rainforests. R. kio have been observed in the rainforest canopy of southwest China at a height of 57 m. This is surprising since they are usually found in the cover of the canopy, as it offers protection from the weather and predators as opposed to the drier top of the canopy which is less suitable for amphibians. Researchers suspect that they were found at the top of the canopy due to the presence of insects and other potential food sources found at that height.

== Distribution ==
Rhacophorus kio is native to the rainforests of south-east Asia. R. kio can be found in China, Laos, Thailand, and Vietnam. In China, they can be found in Guangdong and Yunnan provinces. In Laos, they can be found in the Bokeo, Khammouan, and Phongsaly provinces. In Thailand, they can be found in the Chiang Mai and Tak provinces. In Vietnam, they can be found in the Gia Lai, Ha Tinh, Lao Cai, Quang Binh, and Than Hoa provinces.

Even though the distribution of the species is spread across much of southeast Asia, most of the area is not favorable as hills and mountains are not good breeding locations for these frogs. Instead, R. kio depend on undisturbed canopies, marshes, and ponds within primary rainforests which are threatened due to continued deforestation in Asia.

== Conservation ==
As of April 2017, the IUCN Red List of Threatened Species has R. kio listed in the category of Least Concern even though the population is severely fragmented. There have been sightings of up to 10 males near breeding locations, suggesting that, while there are some locations where the subpopulation of Rhacophorus kio is small, there are still locations with larger subpopulations. Currently, the habitats of Rhacophorus kio face the greatest threat from deforestation due to agriculture, and are affected to a smaller degree by disturbances of breeding pools caused by pollution.

Currently, some of the areas where R. kio is found are under protection. Such locations include Nam Lan Forest Conservation Area, Doi Chiang Dao Wildlife Sanctuary, Ben En National Park, and Thuong Tien Nature Reserve. More research needs to be done to show just how much of the habitat and breeding sites of R. kio are under protection, the full range and total population of the species, and to what extent certain threats are affecting the habitat of R. kio. This information will allow for better informed conservation decisions to be made.

== Reproduction ==
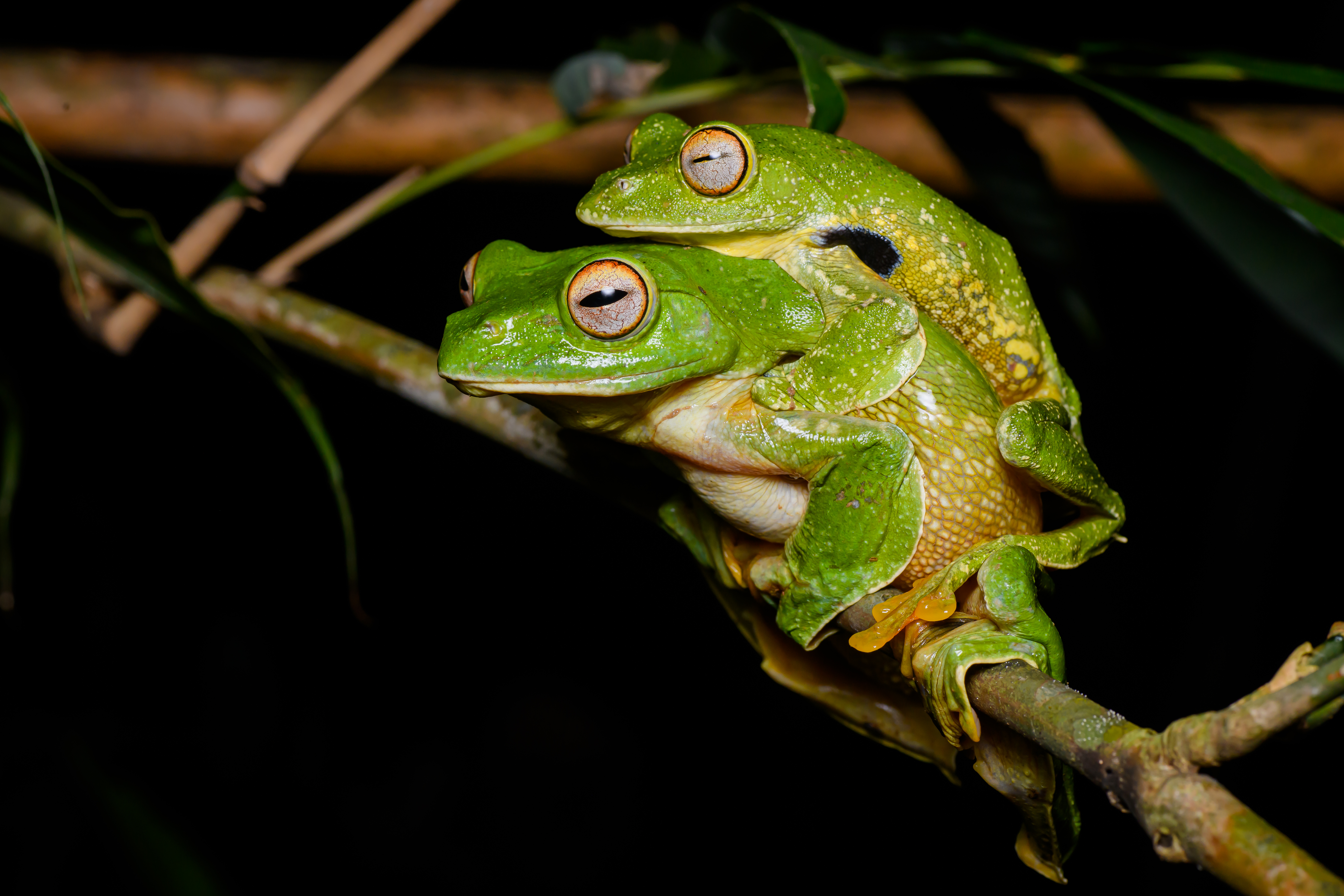
Mating Rhacophorus kio

Reproduction has been observed to occur from around April to July. Male R. kio will call from the tree canopy above breeding pools to attract mates. During amplexus, the female releases her eggs and mucus while the male releases sperm. Both the male and female will kick their hindlegs, creating a sticky foam from the eggs, mucus, and sperm. After the creation of this foam the male will leave. The female will then use her hindlegs to pull in nearby leaves and wrap the foam with these leaves. Her body will hold this position for about two minutes. The female will repeat this process three times with more nearby leaves, eventually creating an ellipsoid structure of leaves covering the clutch. After holding the completed structure for 20 minutes, the female will leave the eggs and the aforementioned foam will eventually harden into a crust. After the eggs turn into embryos and mature, the hatchlings will drop from the structure and into a pool where they will continue the rest of their development to adults.

The eggs of R. kio are often preyed upon by the larvae of Caiusa, a genus of Calliphoridae which infest the egg masses of many species of frogs in the area. The leafy structures of R. kio nests are used to hide their eggs from danger.

== Arboreal Locomotion ==
R. kio have evolved many adaptations to live in their environment of the tree canopy. One of these adaptations is found in the morphology of the hands of this species. They have flexible hands and a knob on their third finger that better allows them to grasp onto tree surfaces. R. kio also have adhesive toe pads that allow them to adhere to wet tree surfaces in the rainforest using friction.

R. kio have the ability to glide to navigate the tree canopies they live in. This gliding ability is due to the webbing in between their appendages on both their hands and feet. When falling, R. kio will extend the webbing on both their hands and feet allowing them to glide from trees. Other species in the Rhacophorus species such as Zhangixalus dugritei, a swamp dwelling frog, do not have the same extensive webbing and also do not exhibit the gliding behavior.

These adaptations reduce the risk of falling and may also play a role in avoiding predation and foraging for food, allowing R. kio to fill a niche in the upper canopy of the rainforest.
