= List of amphibians of Sumatra =

The following is a list of amphibians of Sumatra, Indonesia from Kurniati (2007) and Teynié (2010). Many of the species can be found in Kerinci Seblat National Park and Gunung Leuser National Park.

== Order Anura ==
=== Family Megophryidae ===
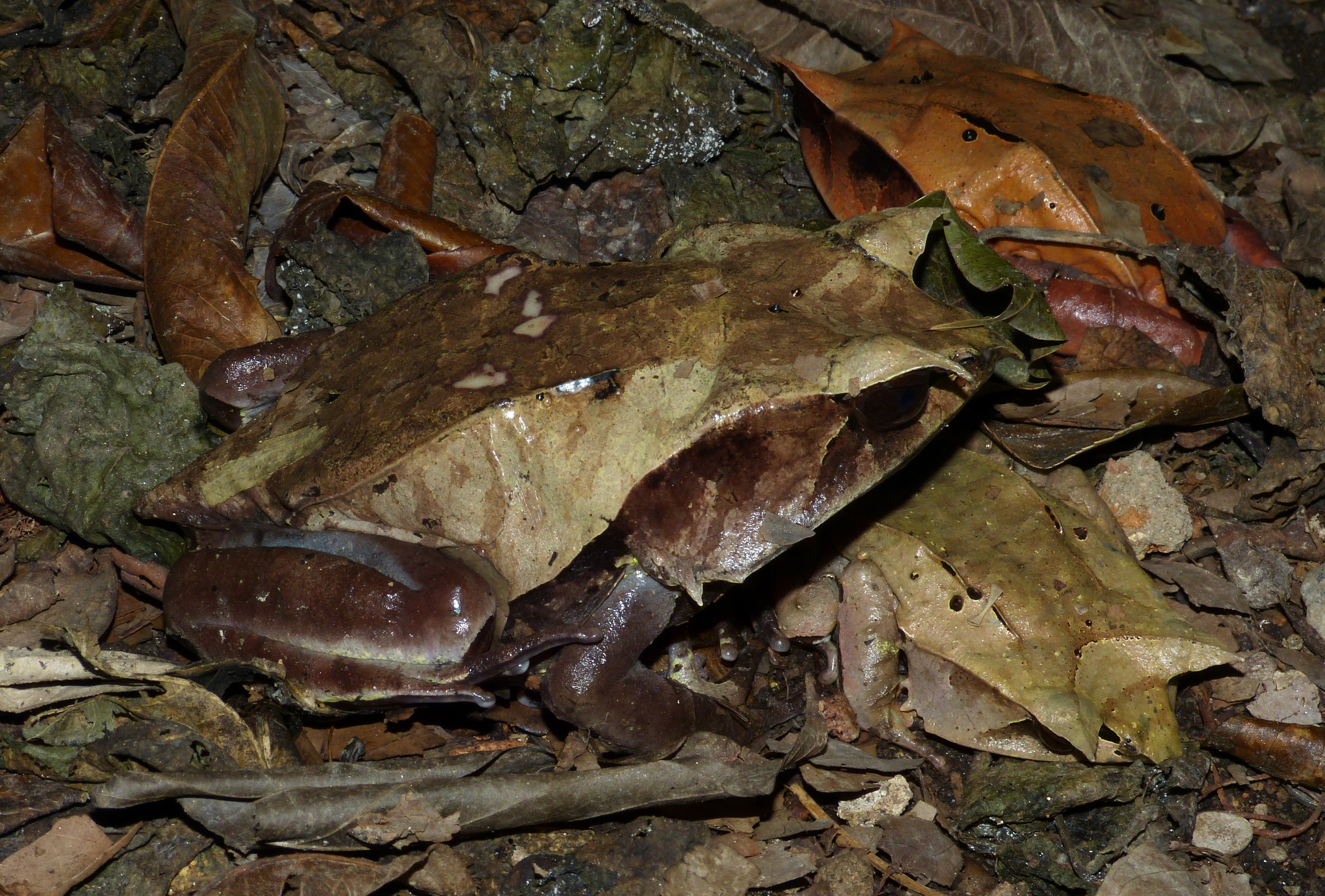
Megophrys nasuta

- Leptobrachium abbotti
- Leptobrachium hasseltii
- Leptobrachium hendricksoni
- Megophrys nasuta
- Xenophrys aceras
- Xenophrys parallela

=== Family Bufonidae ===
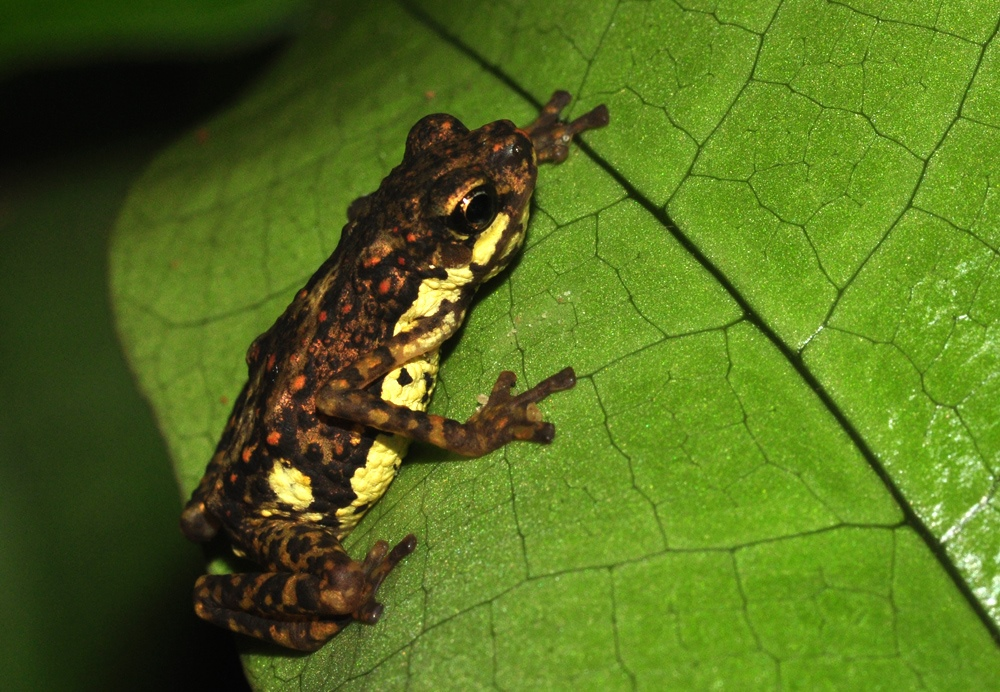
Pelophryne brevipes

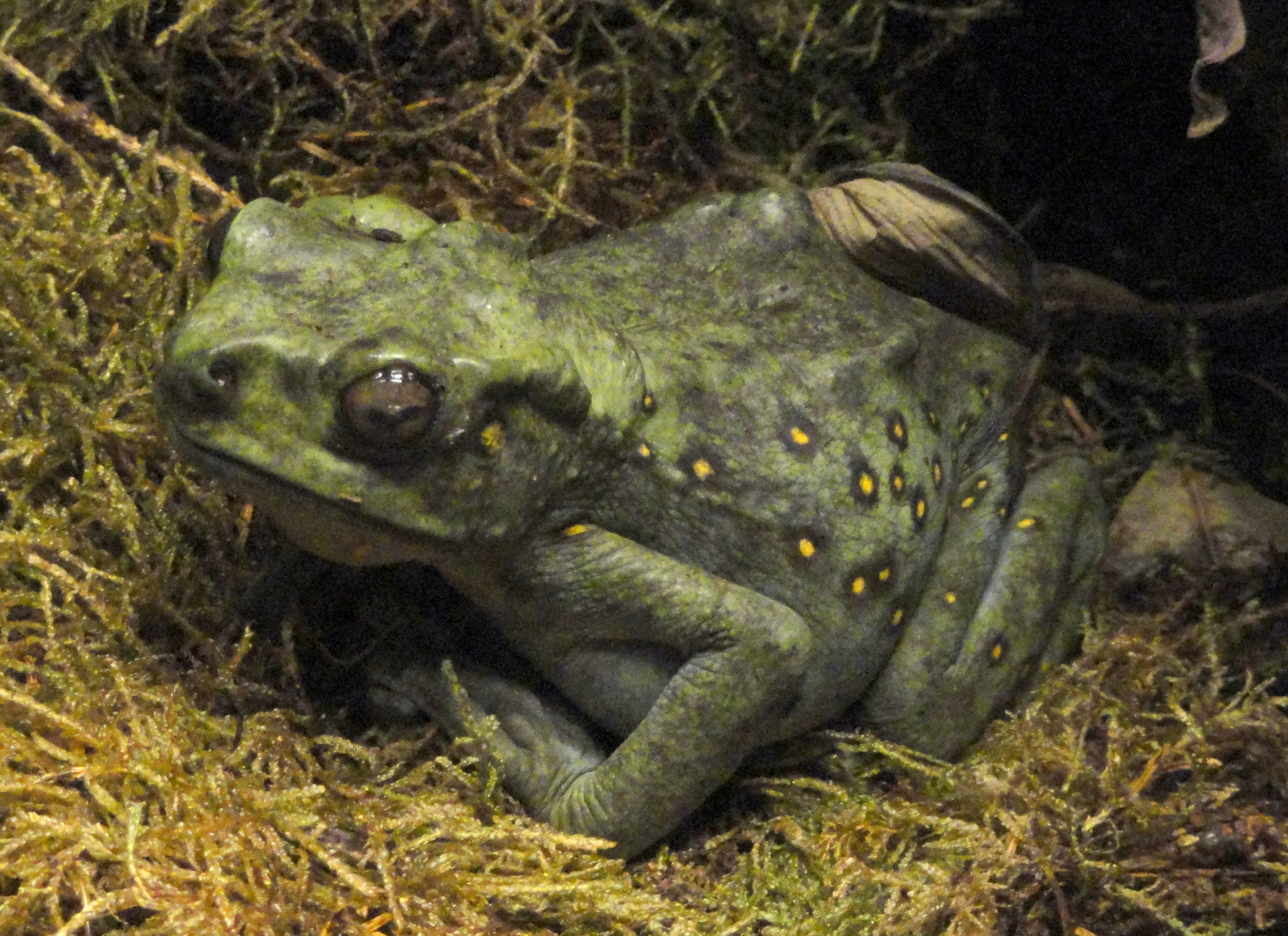
Pedostibes hosii

- Ansonia glandulosa — endemic
- Ansonia leptopus
- Duttaphrynus melanostictus
- Duttaphrynus sumatranus
- Duttaphrynus totol
- Duttaphrynus valhallae
- Ingerophrynus biporcatus
- Ingerophrynus claviger — endemic
- Ingerophrynus divergens
- Ingerophrynus parvus
- Ingerophrynus quadriporcatus
- Leptophryne borbonica
- Pedostibes hosii
- Phrynoidis asper
- Phrynoidis juxtasper
- Pseudobufo subasper

=== Family Microhylidae ===
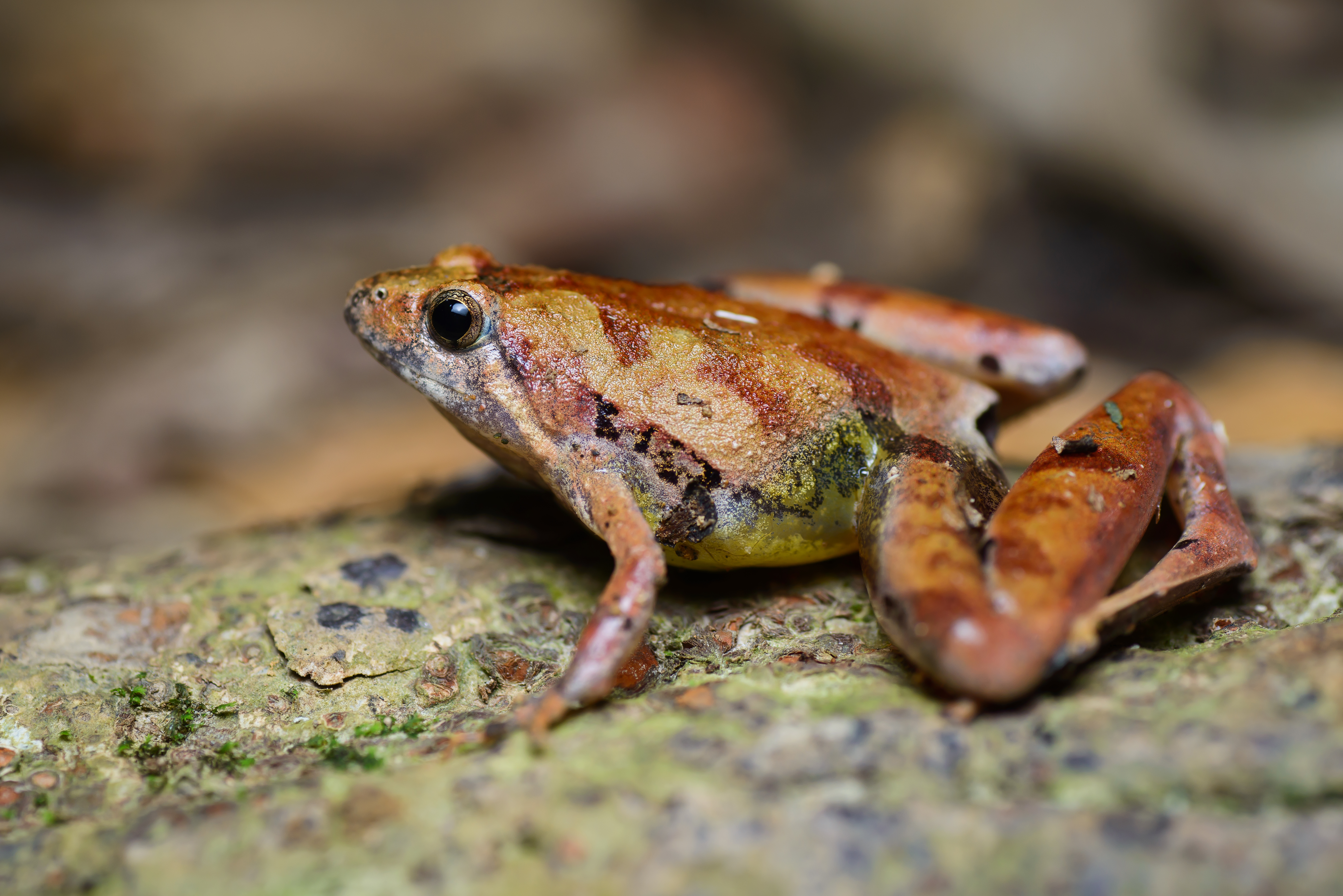
Microhyla berdmorei

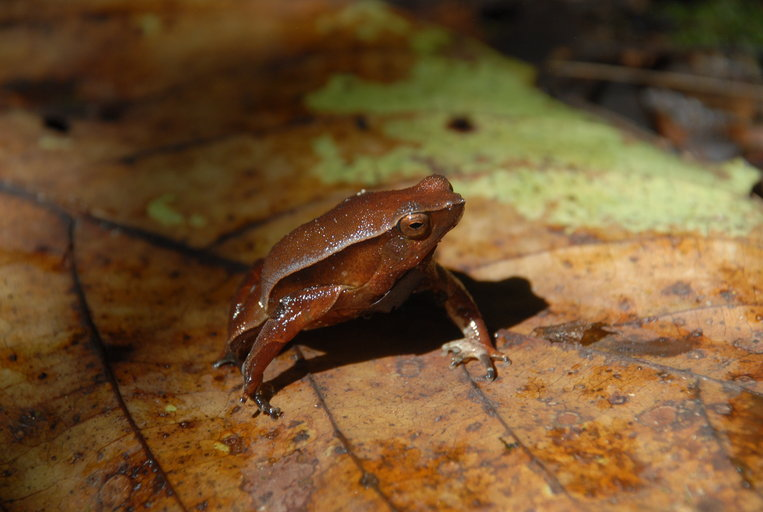
Kalophrynus pleurostigma

- Calluella volzi
- Kalophrynus minusculus
- Kalophrynus pleurostigma
- Kalophrynus punctatus
- Kaloula baleata
- Kaloula pulchra
- Metaphrynella pollicaris
- Metaphrynella sundana
- Microhyla achatina
- Microhyla berdmorei
- Microhyla heymonsi
- Microhyla palmipes
- Microhyla superciliaris
- Micryletta inornata
- Micryletta sumatrana
- Phrynella pulchra

=== Family Dicroglossidae ===
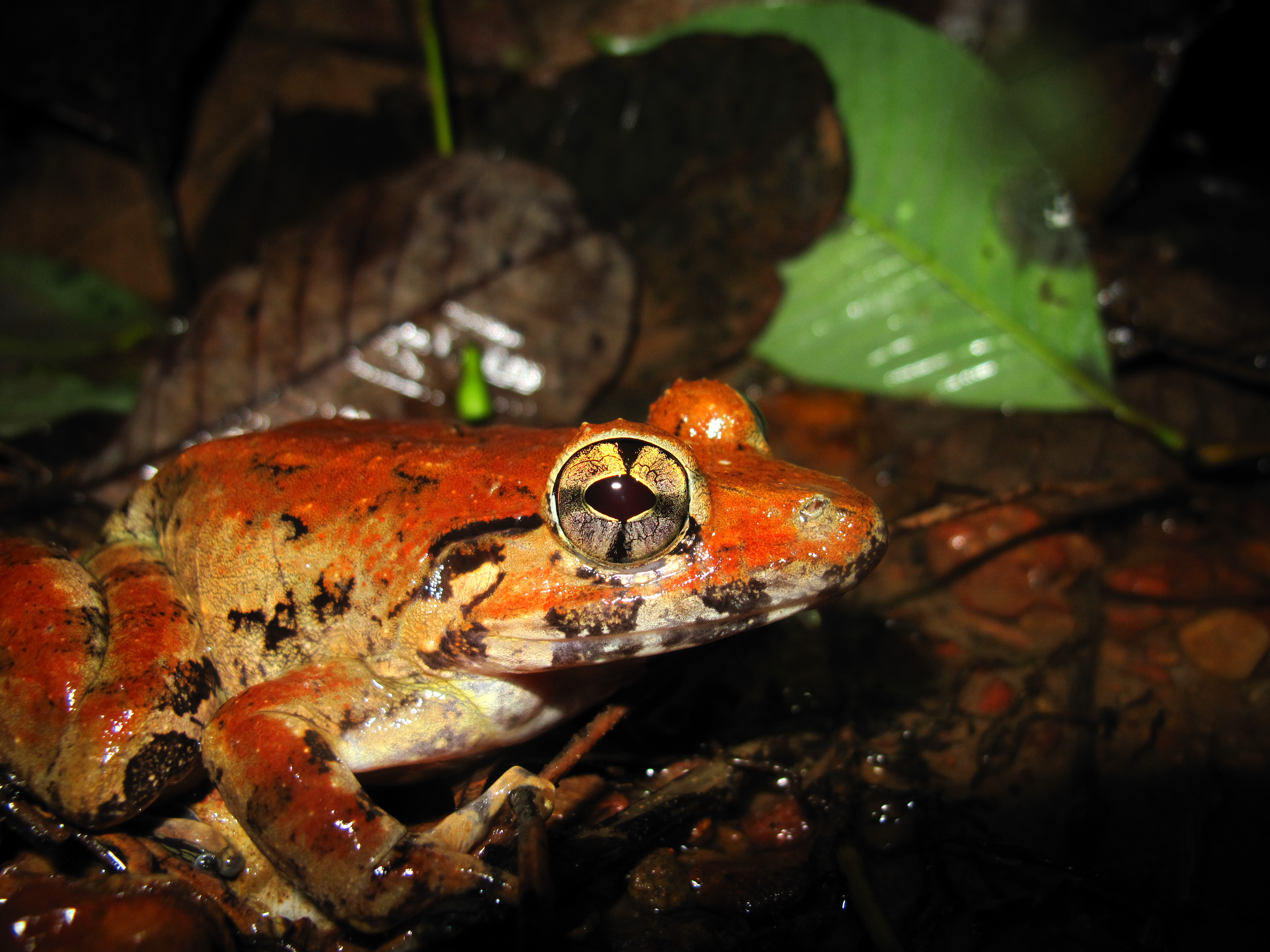
Limnonectes blythii

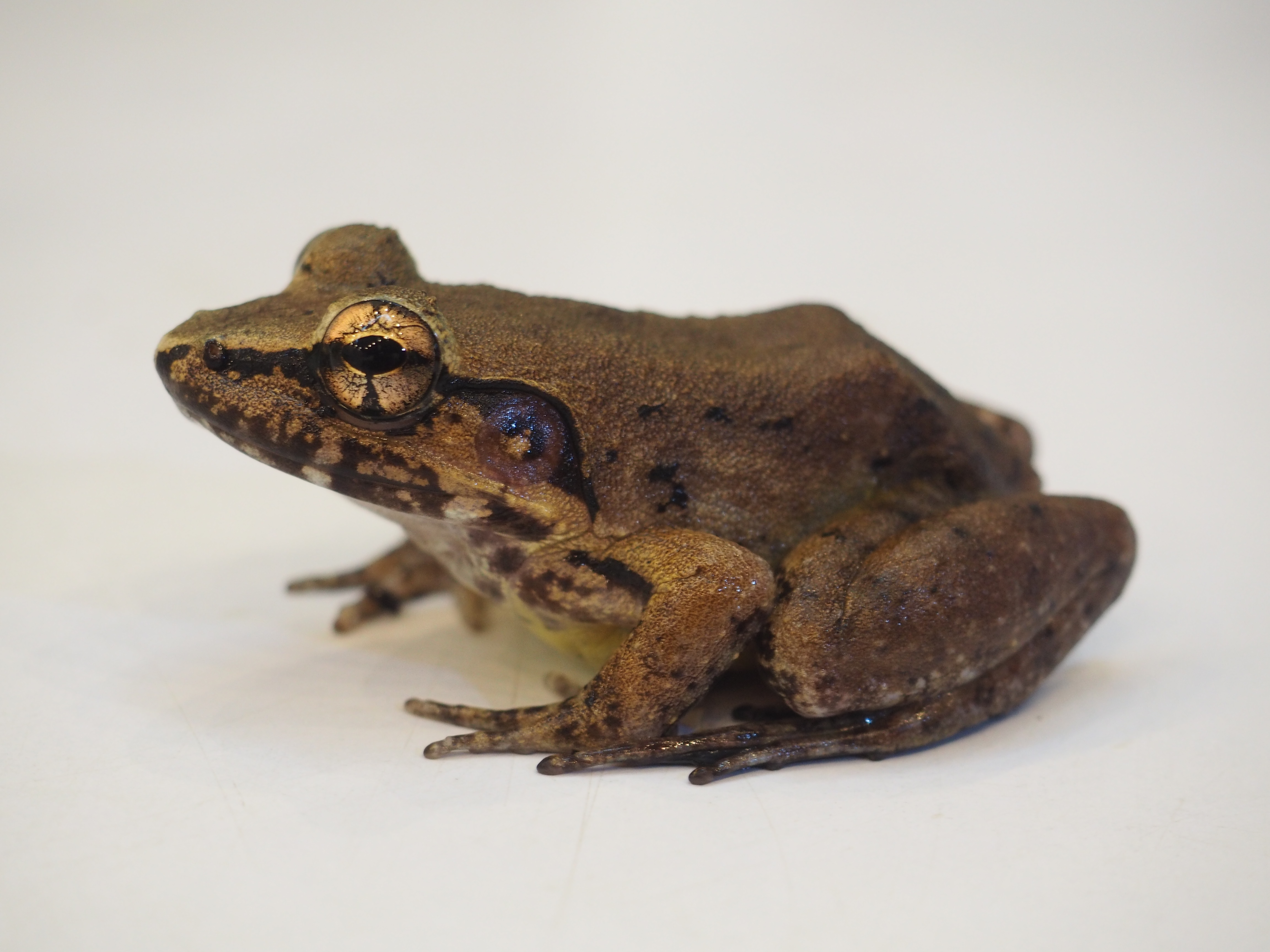
Limnonectes paramacrodon

- Fejervarya cancrivora
- Fejervarya limnocharis
- Limnonectes blythii
- Limnonectes kuhlii
- Limnonectes laticeps
- Limnonectes macrodon
- Limnonectes malesianus
- Limnonectes microdiscus
- Limnonectes paramacrodon
- Limnonectes shompenorum
- Limnonectes tweediei
- Occidozyga baluensis
- Occidozyga laevis
- Occidozyga lima
- Occidozyga sumatrana

=== Family Ranidae ===
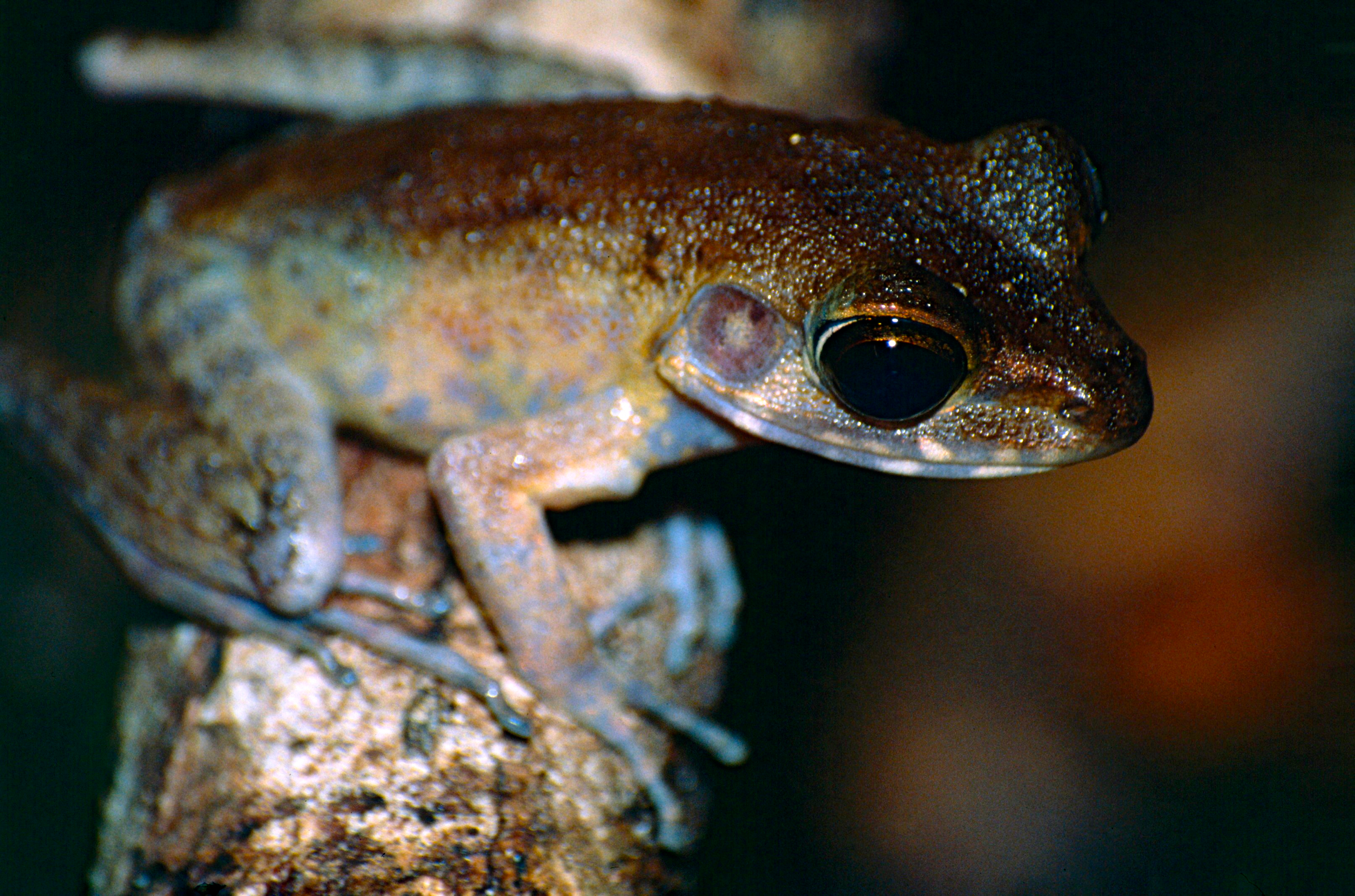
Hylarana baramica

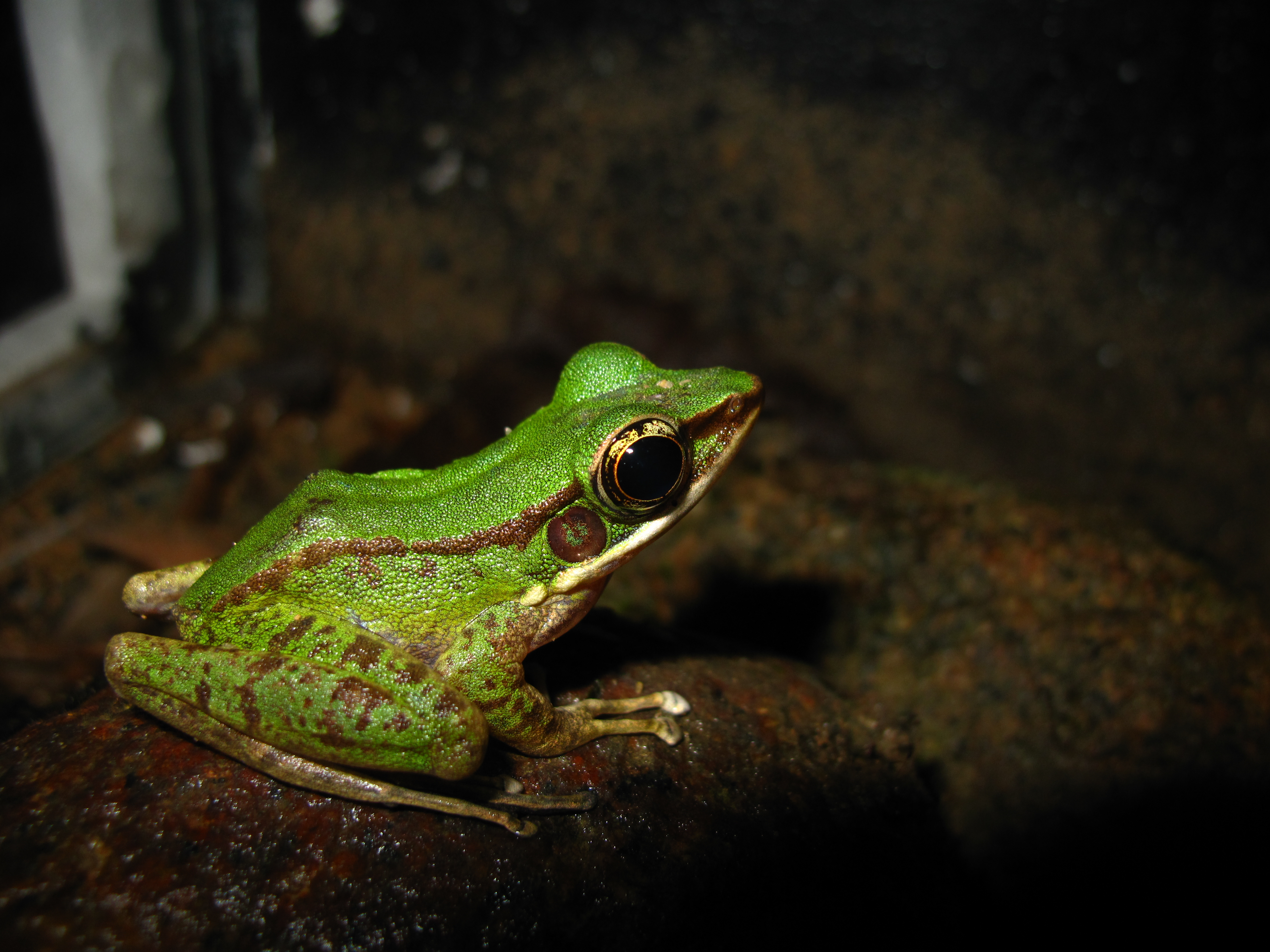
Odorrana hosii

- Huia modiglianii — endemic
- Huia sumatrana — endemic
- Hylarana baramica
- Hylarana chalconota
- Hylarana crassiovis — endemic
- Hylarana debussyi
- Hylarana erythraea
- Hylarana glandulosa
- Hylarana kampeni — endemic
- Hylarana luctuosa
- Hylarana nicobariensis
- Hylarana nigrovittata
- Hylarana persimilis
- Hylarana picturata
- Hylarana raniceps
- Hylarana siberu — endemic
- Odorrana hosii

=== Family Rhacophoridae ===
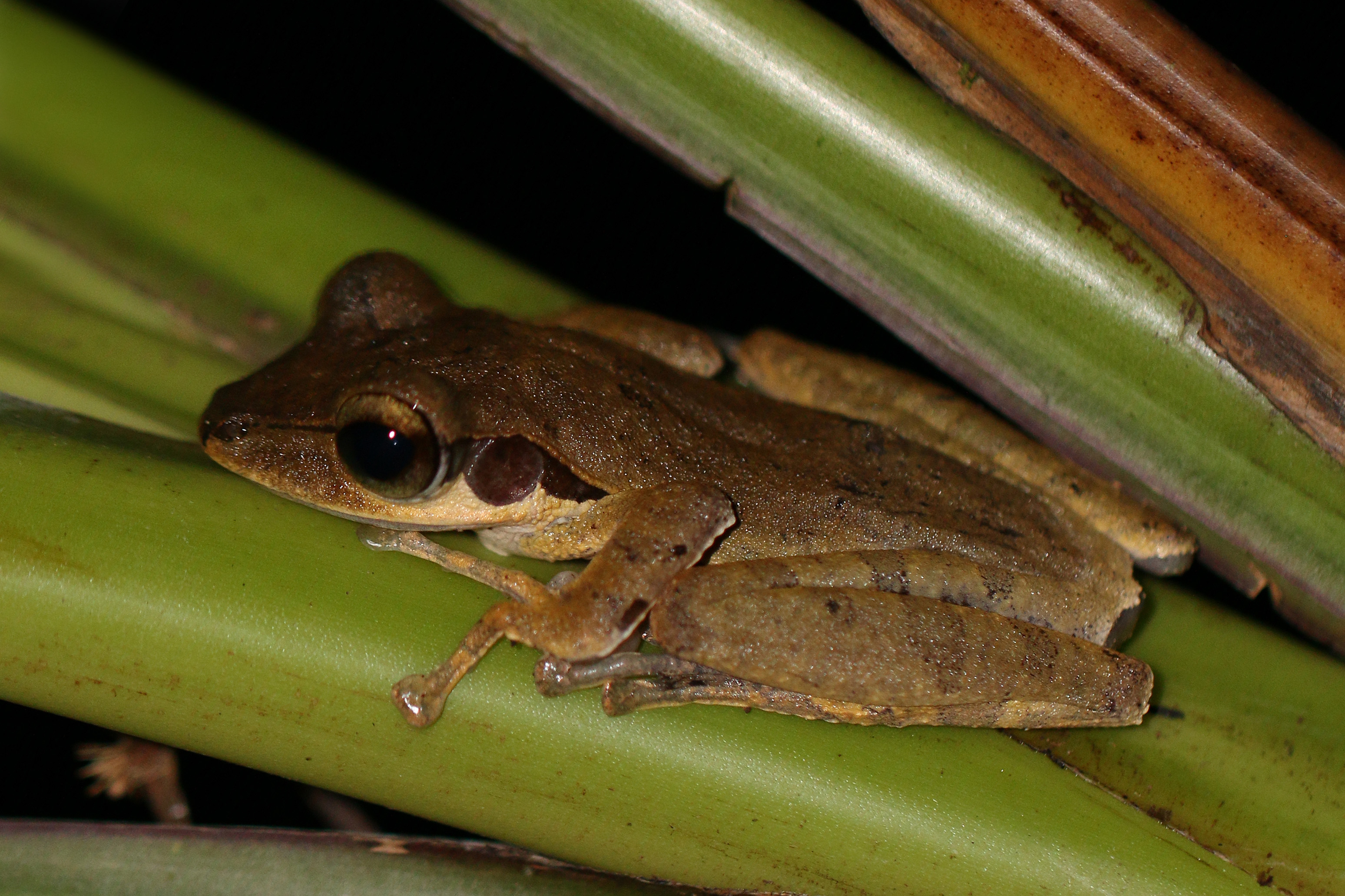
Polypedates macrotis

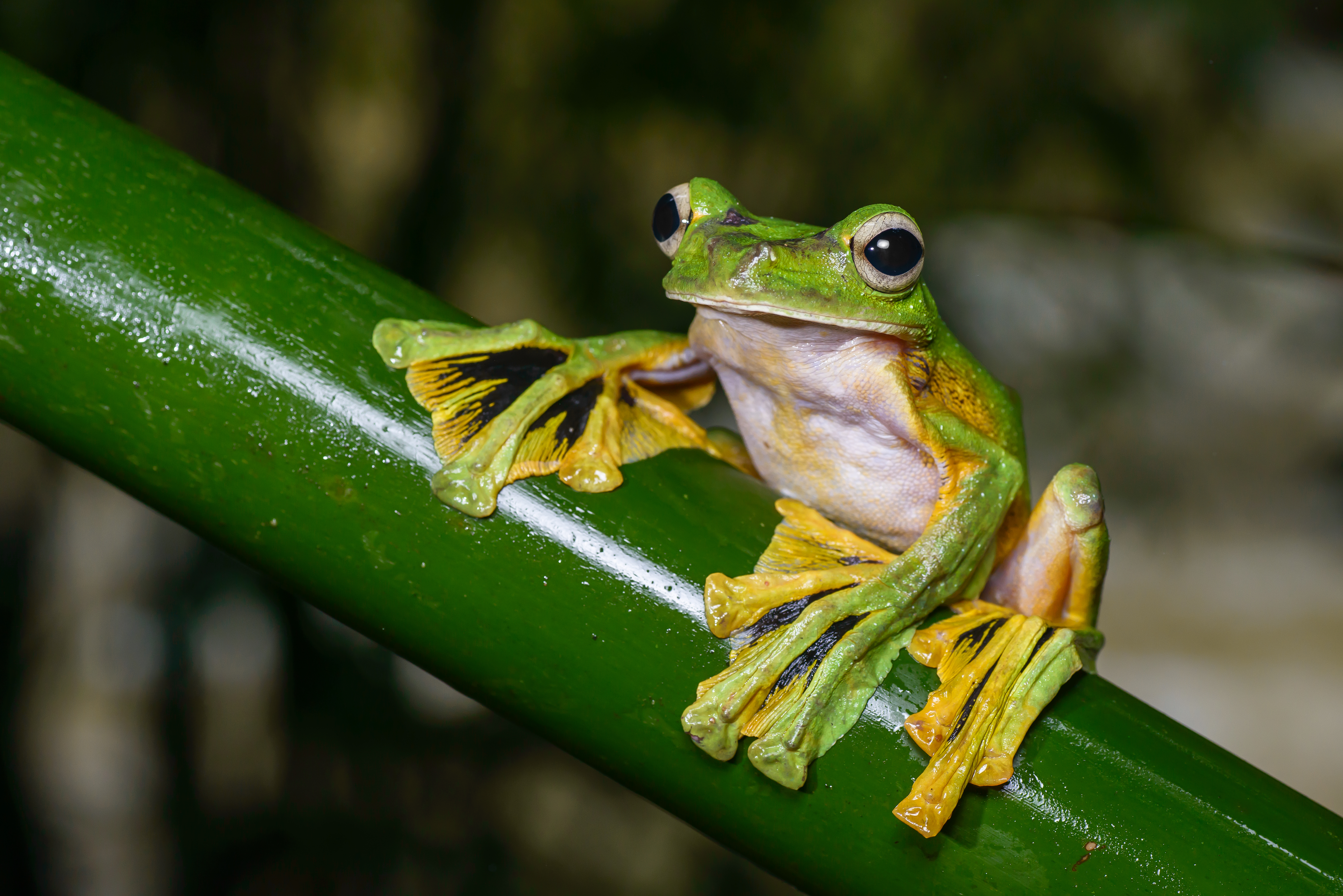
Rhacophorus nigropalmatus

- Nyctixalus pictus
- Philautus aurifasciatus
- Philautus cornutus — endemic
- Philautus similis
- Polypedates colletti
- Polypedates leucomystax
- Polypedates macrotis
- Polypedates pseudotilophus
- Rhacophorus achantharrhena — endemic
- Rhacophorus angulirostris
- Rhacophorus appendiculatus
- Rhacophorus barisani — endemic
- Rhacophorus bifasciatus — endemic
- Rhacophorus catamitus — endemic
- Rhacophorus cyanopunctatus
- Rhacophorus modestus — endemic
- Rhacophorus nigropalmatus
- Rhacophorus pardalis
- Rhacophorus poecilonotus — endemic
- Rhacophorus prominanus
- Rhacophorus reinwardtii
- Theloderma asperum
- Theloderma horridum
- Theloderma leporosum

== Order Gymnophiona ==
=== Family Ichthyophiidae ===
- Ichthyophis billitonensis
- Ichthyophis elongatus
- Ichthyophis paucisulcus
- Ichthyophis sumatranus
