= C. minuta =

C. minuta may refer to:

- Calidris minuta, the little stint, a very small wader species
- Calluella minuta, a frog species endemic to Malaysia
- Catocala minuta, the little underwing, a moth species found the United States
- Chiltonia minuta, an amphipod crustacean species endemic to New Zealand

== See also ==
- Minuta
