= Ingerophrynus gollum =

Conservation status
- Endangered (IUCN 3.1)

Scientific classification
- Kingdom: Animalia
- Phylum: Chordata
- Class: Amphibia
- Order: Anura
- Family: Bufonidae
- Genus: Ingerophrynus
- Species: I. gollum

Binomial name
- Ingerophrynus gollum Grismer, 2007

Species of amphibian

Ingerophrynus gollum (Gollum's toad) is a toad species in the family Bufonidae, the true toads. It is endemic to the Peninsular Malaysia and has only been recorded from its type locality in the Endau-Rompin National Park, Johor. However, I. gollum is genetically so close to Ingerophrynus divergens that its validity as a distinct species can be questioned.

== Etymology ==
It is called "gollum" with reference of the eponymous character of The Lord of the Rings by J. R. R. Tolkien.

== Description ==
Three adult males in the type series measure 27–28 mm (1.06–1.10 in) in snout–vent length; females are unknown. The head is relatively large whereas the body and the limbs are slender. The tympanum is distinct. The parotoid gland is elongated, low in profile. Fingers are long with blunt tips. The toes are partially webbed. Skin of the flanks and the dorsum is covered with numerous warts. The ground color of the dorsum and the flanks is orange. The mid-dorsal stripe is white and prominent. The inter-orbital region is black. The dorsum has large, black warts. The ventrum is orange with dark blotches. The iris is gold. Males have median subgular vocal sac.

The male advertisement call is a low, diphasic, raspy, coughing sound.

== Habitat and conservation ==
The type series was collected in closed-canopy lowland forest (46 m (151 ft) above sea level) in the early evening following brief periods of afternoon precipitation. Males were heard calling from a swampy area centered on a slow-moving, shallow stream. They were seated ≤0.5 m above the ground on dead vegetation along the streambed. It is well protected within the national park. Outside the park, if it occurs there, its habitat is threatened by logging and agricultural expansion (especially oil palm plantations).
