= Micryletta steinegeri =

Conservation status
- Vulnerable (IUCN 3.1)

Scientific classification
- Kingdom: Animalia
- Phylum: Chordata
- Class: Amphibia
- Order: Anura
- Family: Microhylidae
- Genus: Micryletta
- Species: M. steinegeri

Binomial name
- Micryletta steinegeri (Boulenger, 1909)

Synonyms
- Microhyla steinegeri Boulenger, 1909; Rana gracilipes Gressitt, 1938

Species of amphibian

Micryletta steinegeri (common names: Stejneger's paddy frog, Stejneger's narrow-mouthed toad, paddy frog, Taiwan little pygmy frog) is a species of frog in the family Microhylidae. It is endemic to central and southern Taiwan. In the past it has also been considered as a synonym of Micryletta inornata from continental Asia.

== Description ==
Micryletta steinegeri is a small frog, growing to a maximum length of 25 mm (0.98 in). It has a slender body that is brown in colour, with irregular dark markings. Colouration varies a lot among individuals. Arms of front legs are orange. Breeding takes place in late spring and early summer in explosive breeding events. The tadpoles are almost transparent.

== Range ==
Its range is fragmented within central and southern Taiwan. It is also present in Kenting National Park.

== Habitat and conservation ==
Micryletta steinegeri inhabits broadleaf forests, sometimes also to be found in cultivated fields and orchards. Tadpoles develop in temporary rainwater pools, blocked ditches and cisterns. It is a rare frog known only from few localities. It is threatened by habitat loss.
