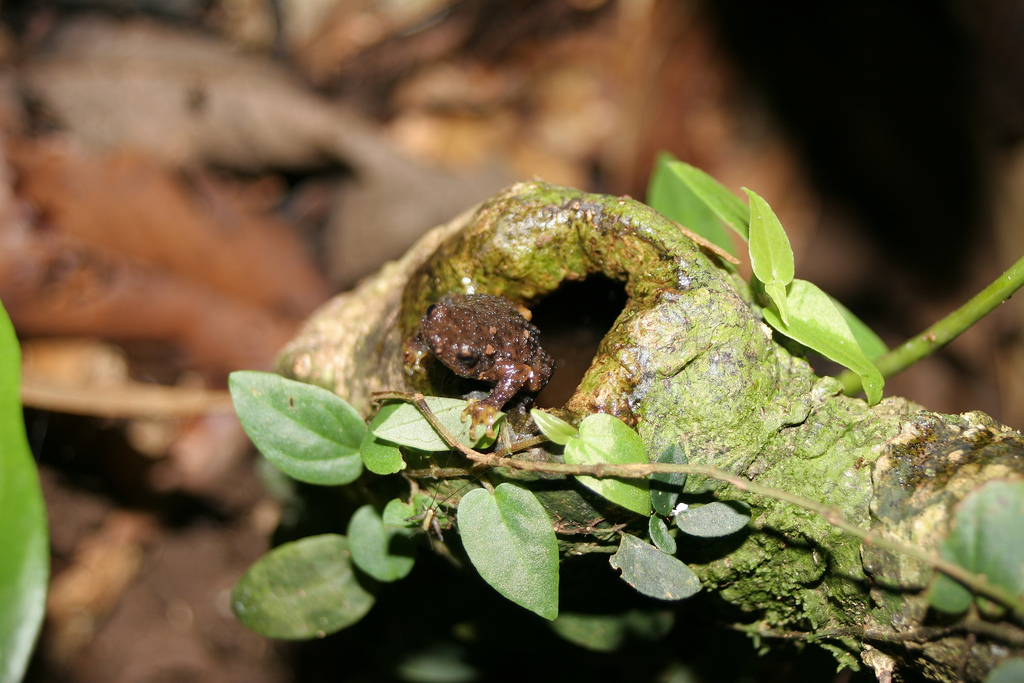
- Metaphrynella sundana

Scientific classification
- Kingdom: Animalia
- Phylum: Chordata
- Class: Amphibia
- Order: Anura
- Family: Microhylidae
- Subfamily: Microhylinae
- Genus: Metaphrynella; Parker, 1934

Type species
- Phrynella pollicaris Boulenger, 1890

Diversity
- 2 species (see text)

= Metaphrynella =

Genus of amphibians

Metaphrynella is a small genus of microhylid frogs from the southern Malay Peninsula and Borneo. They are sometimes known as the Borneo treefrogs or tree hole frogs. The common name refers to the microhabitat of these frogs: males call from tree holes and tadpoles develop in the water contained in those holes.

== Description ==
Metaphrynella are small, arboreal frogs that have plump bodies and adhesive finger and toe tips.

== Taxonomy ==
Metaphrynella may be paraphyletic, as molecular data suggest that Phrynella is phylogenetically imbedded within it. Another study suggests that its closest relatives are Kaloula, Uperodon, and Ramanella. A molecular phylogenetic study by De Sá et al. (2012) shows Kaloula to be a sister clade of Metaphrynella.

== Species ==
There are two species:

Binomial name and author	Common name
Metaphrynella pollicaris (Boulenger, 1890)	Malaysian treefrog
Metaphrynella sundana (Peters, 1867)	Borneo treefrog
