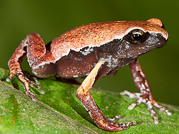

Scientific classification
- Kingdom: Animalia
- Phylum: Chordata
- Class: Amphibia
- Order: Anura
- Family: Microhylidae
- Subfamily: Microhylinae
- Genus: Mysticellus; Garg and Biju, 2019
- Species: M. franki

Binomial name
- Mysticellus franki Garg and Biju, 2019

= Franky's narrow-mouthed frog =

Species of amphibian

Franky's narrow-mouthed frog (Mysticellus franki) is a species of frog in the family Microhylidae. It is the only member of the monotypic genus Mysticellus, the mysterious narrow-mouthed frogs. It is endemic to the Western Ghats of India, where it is only known from Wayanad District in northern Kerala state. Taxonomic evidence indicates that its closest relatives are the Micryletta frogs of Southeast Asia.

== Etymology ==
The genus name, Mysticellus, is a masculine noun derived from the Latin mysticus (meaning "mysterious") + ellus (a diminutive), highlighting the ability of this small frog to remain out of sight despite its presence in wayside areas surrounding human settlements.

The species name, franki, is a Latin genitive honoring evolutionary biologist professor Franky Bossuyt of Vrije Universiteit Brussel, recognizing his role in global amphibian research and education, and particularly for his contribution to the study of Indian amphibians.

== Behavior ==
This species is only visible during the first two days of monsoon showers, when it tends to congregate in temporary water puddles, including in abandoned roadside quarries, where the type specimens were discovered. During courtship, the male tends to raise the hind part of its body, displaying a pair of black "false eyes" or eyespots. This action is also performed when individuals are disturbed, indicating that they may also be used to ward off predators. After 4 or 5 days, all adult frogs disappear from the breeding site, leaving just the eggs.
