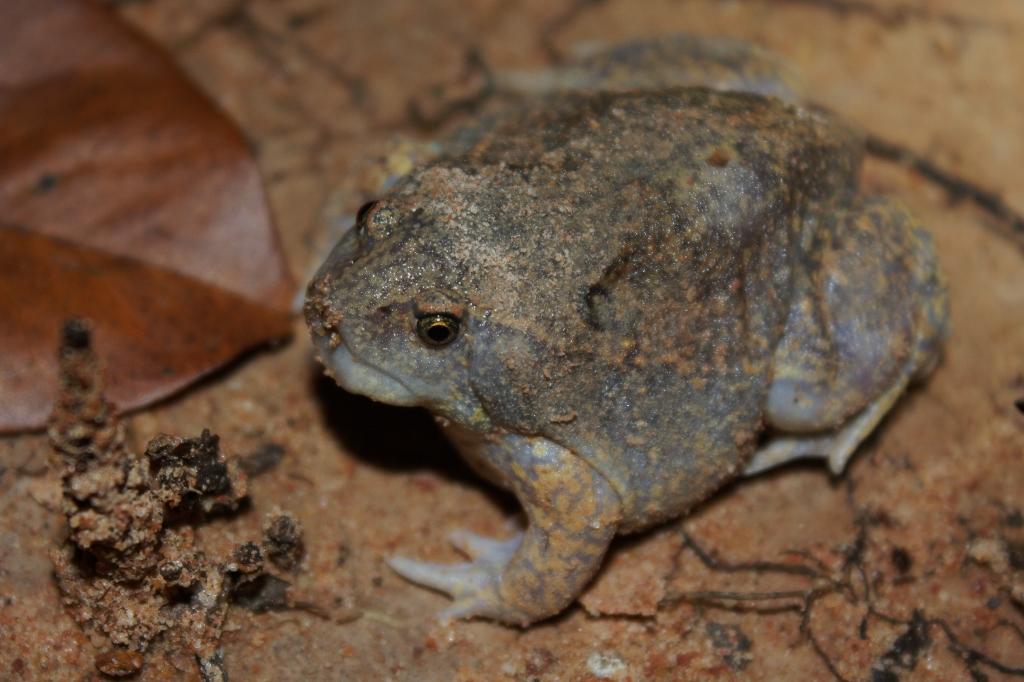
- Glyphoglossus molossus, the type species

Scientific classification
- Domain: Eukaryota
- Kingdom: Animalia
- Phylum: Chordata
- Class: Amphibia
- Order: Anura
- Family: Microhylidae
- Subfamily: Microhylinae
- Genus: Glyphoglossus; Günther, 1869

Type species
- Glyphoglossus molossus Günther, 1869

Species
- 9 species (see text)

Synonyms
- Calluella Stoliczka, 1872; Kalluella — incorrect subsequent spelling; Colpoglossus Boulenger, 1904; Dyscophina van Kampen, 1905; Calliglutus Barbour and Noble, 1916

= Glyphoglossus =

Genus of amphibians

Glyphoglossus is a genus of frogs in the family Microhylidae. The genus occurs in Southeastern Asia. Common name balloon frogs has been coined for it, whereas the common name squat frogs refers to the Calluella species that are now included in this genus. They are fossorial frogs that spend only limited time on the soil surface and are typically known from only few specimens.

== Taxonomy ==
Glyphoglossus, as currently delimited, includes species formerly included in a separate genus, Calluella. Molecular genetic data strongly suggest that Glyphoglossus is nested within Calluella. Consequently, Calluella was brought into synonymy of Glyphoglossus.

== Description ==
Diagnostic characteristics of Calluella are wide head and flattened body; reduced eyes; presence of maxillary and vomerine teeth; toes with reduced webbing; circular pupil; large, oval, and entire tongue; palate having paired dermal ridges; and a large compressed inner metatarsal tubercle under each foot. Species of this Genus are found in the range from Southern China to Indo-Malaya

== Species ==
There are nine recognized species:

- Glyphoglossus brooksii (Boulenger, 1904)
- Glyphoglossus capsus (Das, Min, Hsu, Hertwig, and Haas, 2014)
- Glyphoglossus flavus (Kiew, 1984)
- Glyphoglossus guttulatus (Blyth, 1856)
- Glyphoglossus minutus (Das, Yaakob, and Lim, 2004)
- Glyphoglossus molossus Günther, 1869
- Glyphoglossus smithi (Barbour and Noble, 1916)
- Glyphoglossus volzi (Van Kampen, 1905)
- Glyphoglossus yunnanensis (Boulenger, 1919)
