= Glyphoglossus flavus =

Conservation status
- Least Concern (IUCN 3.1)

Scientific classification
- Kingdom: Animalia
- Phylum: Chordata
- Class: Amphibia
- Order: Anura
- Family: Microhylidae
- Genus: Glyphoglossus
- Species: G. flavus

Binomial name
- Glyphoglossus flavus (Kiew, 1984)

Synonyms
- Calluella flava Kiew, 1984

Species of frog

Glyphoglossus flavus is a species of frog in the family Microhylidae. It is endemic to Borneo and is known from the Gunung Mulu National Park in Sarawak (Malaysia), Danum Valley Conservation Area in Sabah (Malaysia), and Ulu Temburong National Park in Brunei. Common names Borneo squat frog and yellow burrowing frog have been coined for it.

Its natural habitats are tropical swamp forests. This burrowing frog is difficult to find and is expected to be more widely distributed than currently known.
