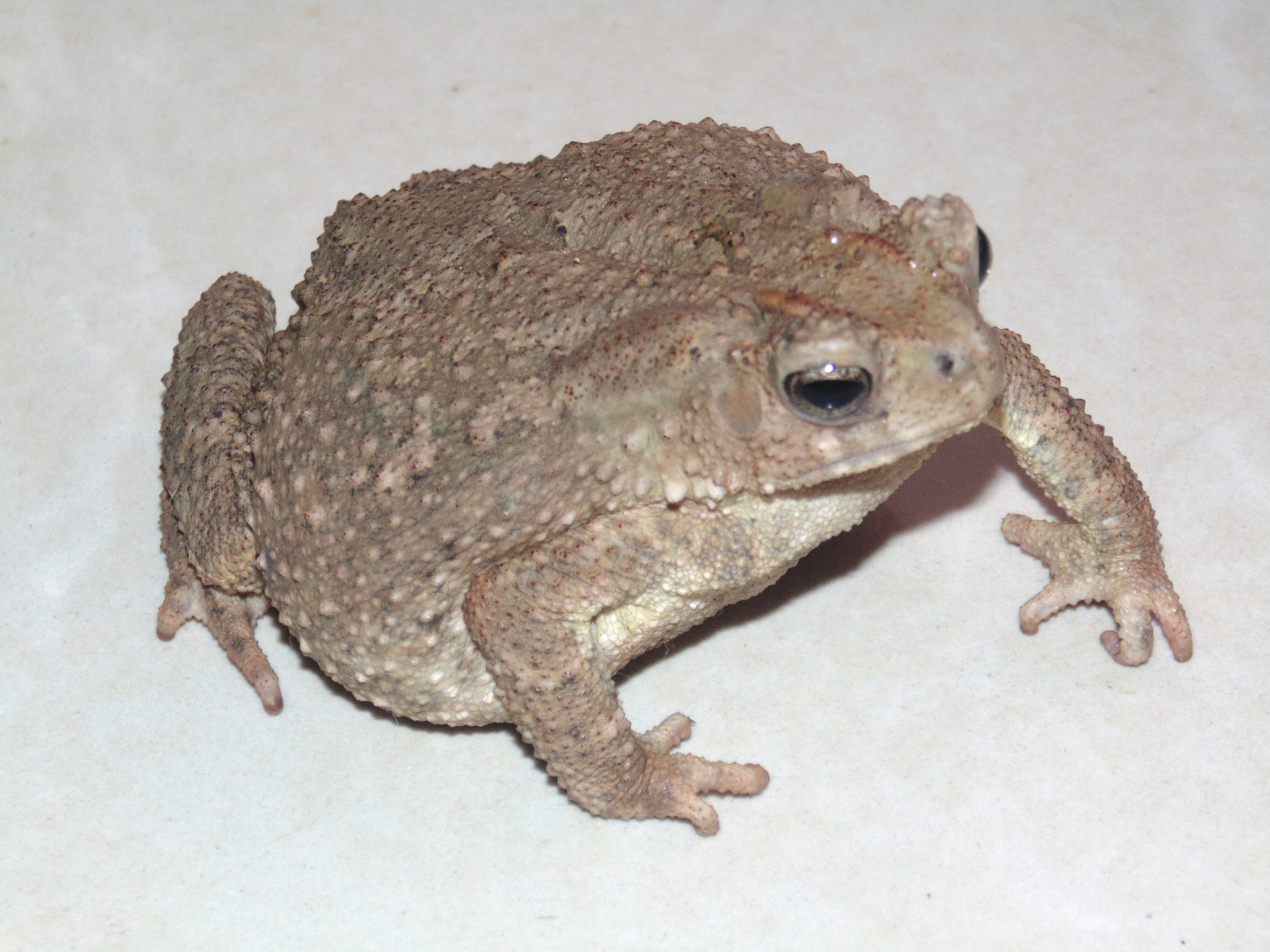

Conservation status
- Least Concern (IUCN 3.1)

Scientific classification
- Kingdom: Animalia
- Phylum: Chordata
- Class: Amphibia
- Order: Anura
- Family: Bufonidae
- Genus: Ingerophrynus
- Species: I. philippinicus

Binomial name
- Ingerophrynus philippinicus Boulenger, 1887

Synonyms
- Bufo philippinicus

= Philippine toad =

Philippine Toad

Species of amphibian

The Philippine toad (Ingerophrynus philippinicus) is a species of toad in the family Bufonidae. It is endemic to the Philippines. Its natural habitats are subtropical or tropical dry forest, subtropical or tropical moist lowland forest, subtropical or tropical swamps, subtropical or tropical moist montane forest, subtropical or tropical moist shrubland, intermittent rivers, swamps, freshwater lakes, intermittent freshwater lakes, freshwater marshes, intermittent freshwater marshes, intertidal marches, arable land, plantations, rural gardens, urban areas, water storage areas, ponds, aquaculture ponds, and seasonally flooded agricultural land.
