= Bony-headed toad =

Conservation status
- Least Concern (IUCN 3.1)

Scientific classification
- Kingdom: Animalia
- Phylum: Chordata
- Class: Amphibia
- Order: Anura
- Family: Bufonidae
- Genus: Ingerophrynus
- Species: I. galeatus

Binomial name
- Ingerophrynus galeatus (Günther, 1864)

Synonyms
- Bufo galeatus Günther, 1864

Species of amphibian

The bony-headed toad (Ingerophrynus galeatus) is a species of toad in the family Bufonidae. It is found in Cambodia, Laos, and Vietnam. Earlier it has been also reported from Hainan Island (China), but these have now been named as a new species, Ingerophrynus ledongensis. Its natural habitats are subtropical or tropical moist lowland forests, subtropical or tropical moist montane forests, and rivers. It is threatened by habitat loss.
