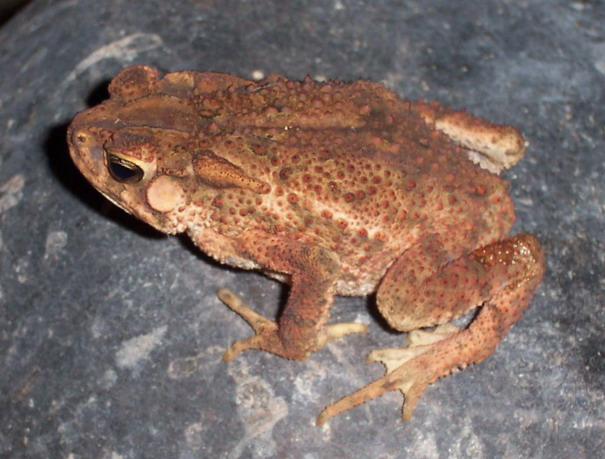
- Crested toad (Ingerophrynus biporcatus)

Scientific classification
- Kingdom: Animalia
- Phylum: Chordata
- Class: Amphibia
- Order: Anura
- Family: Bufonidae
- Genus: Ingerophrynus; Frost et al., 2006

Species
- 12 species (see text)

= Ingerophrynus =

Genus of amphibians

Ingerophrynus is a genus of true toads with 12 species. The genus is found in southern Yunnan and Southeast Asia; from Myanmar and Indochina to peninsular Thailand and Malaya, Sumatra, Borneo, Java, Nias Island, Sulawesi, and the Philippines. This genus was established after a major taxonomical revision of frogs in 2006.

== Taxonomy and systematics ==
Ten species currently assigned to this genus were formerly treated as members of the genus Bufo, most of them within the assemblage previously referred to as the Bufo biporcatus group. The remaining species were transferred to Ingerophrynus on the basis of molecular phylogenetic evidence. In 2007, a further species, Ingerophrynus gollum, was described and included in the genus.

Phylogenetically, Ingerophrynus is regarded as the sister taxon of Sabahphrynus.

== Etymology ==
The generic name Ingerophrynus honors Robert F. Inger, an American zoologist from the Field Museum of Natural History.

== Description ==
The diagnostic characters of the Bufo biporcatus group are the presence of supraorbital, parietal, and supratympanic crests, lack of a tarsal ridge, presence of vocal sacs but absence of melanophores in the surrounding muscle tissue, lack of tibial glands, lack supinator manus humeralis and adductor longus muscles, presence of paired crests on the vertebral column, rugose skull, squamosal bones with broad dorsal otic plates, and smooth palatine bones.

== Species ==
There are 12 species:

Binomial name and binomial authority	common name
Ingerophrynus biporcatus (Gravenhorst, 1829)	crested toad
Ingerophrynus celebensis (Günther, 1859)	Sulawesian toad
Ingerophrynus claviger (W. Peters, 1863)	Benkulen toad
Ingerophrynus divergens (W. Peters, 1871)	Malayan dwarf toad
Ingerophrynus galeatus (Günther, 1864)	bony-headed toad
Ingerophrynus gollum L. Grismer, 2007
Ingerophrynus kumquat (Das & Lim, 2001)
Ingerophrynus ledongensis (Fei, Ye & Huang, 2009)
Ingerophrynus macrotis (Boulenger, 1887)	big-eared toad
Ingerophrynus parvus (Boulenger, 1887)	lesser Malacca toad
Ingerophrynus philippinicus (Boulenger, 1887)	Philippine toad
Ingerophrynus quadriporcatus (Boulenger, 1887)	greater Malacca toad

Nota bene: A binomial authority in parentheses indicates that the species was originally described in a genus other than Ingerophrynus.
