= Glyphoglossus smithi =

Conservation status
- Near Threatened (IUCN 3.1)

Scientific classification
- Kingdom: Animalia
- Phylum: Chordata
- Class: Amphibia
- Order: Anura
- Family: Microhylidae
- Genus: Glyphoglossus
- Species: G. smithi

Binomial name
- Glyphoglossus smithi (Barbour and Noble, 1916)

Synonyms
- Calliglutus smithi Barbour and Noble, 1916; Colpoglossus smithi (Barbour and Noble, 1916); Calluella smithi (Barbour and Noble, 1916)

Species of frog

Glyphoglossus smithi, also known as Smith's squat frog or Smith's burrowing frog, is a species of frog in the family Microhylidae. It is endemic to Sabah and Sarawak in Malaysian Borneo. However, it is likely to occur more widely than currently known and be present in Brunei and Indonesia. The specific name smithi honours Dr Harrison Willard Smith, an American scientist who collected the holotype from the Limbang River district.

== Description ==
Adult females measure up to 39 mm (1.5 in) in snout–vent length. The overall appearance is stocky. The head is small, slightly wider than it is long. The snout is truncate. The tympanum is present but hidden under skin. The finger tips are not expanded but the toe tips are expanded into small discs. The toes are about one-fourth webbed. Skin is smooth. Colouration is dark brown above with dark markings edged with pink or red. A conspicuous red or pink arc may be present above the anus.

== Habitat and conservation ==
Glyphoglossus smithi occurs in lowland rainforests. It is a secretive, burrowing species that is rarely observed. The eggs are probably laid in pools of standing water on the forest floor. It is threatened by habitat loss caused by clear-cutting. The type locality in Sarawak has experienced severe habitat loss and the species might no longer persist there. The Sabah locality is, however, within the Danum Valley Conservation Area, which is well protected.
