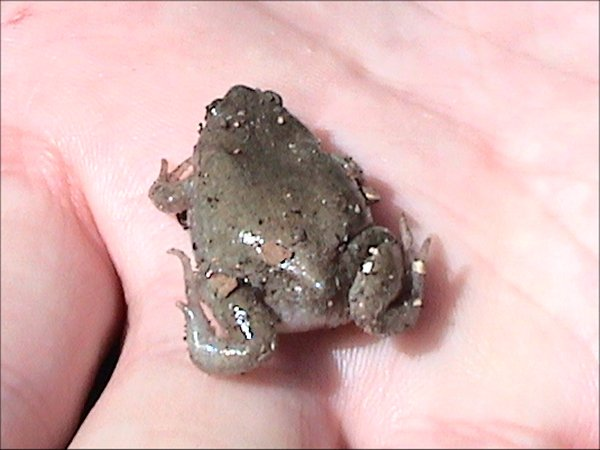
- Great Plains narrowmouth toad, Gastrophryne olivacea

Scientific classification
- Domain: Eukaryota
- Kingdom: Animalia
- Phylum: Chordata
- Class: Amphibia
- Order: Anura
- Suborder: Neobatrachia
- Clade: Ranoidea
- Family: Microhylidae
- Subfamily: Microhylinae; Günther, 1858

Genera
- 9, see text.

= Microhylinae =

Microhylinae Temporal range: Early Eocene - present, 52–0 Ma

Subfamily of amphibians

The Microhylinae are a subfamily of microhylid frogs. It contains 9 genera. Phylogenetic studies have estimated the family Microhylidae to be about 52 million years old.

== Genera ==
The following genera are recognised in the subfamily Microhylinae:

- Glyphoglossus Günther, 1869
- Kaloula Gray, 1831
- Metaphrynella Parker, 1934
- Microhyla Tschudi, 1838
- Micryletta Dubois, 1987
- Mysticellus Sonali & Biju, 2019
- Nanohyla Poyarkov, Gorin & Scherz, 2021
- Phrynella Boulenger, 1887
- Uperodon Duméril & Bibron, 1841
