= Chiltoniidae =

Scientific classification
- Kingdom: Animalia
- Phylum: Arthropoda
- Clade: Pancrustacea
- Class: Malacostraca
- Order: Amphipoda
- Parvorder: Talitridira
- Superfamily: Hyaloidea
- Family: Chiltoniidae; Barnard, 1972

Genera
- See text.

Family of crustaceans

Chiltoniidae is a family of amphipods, which contains the following genera:

- Afrochiltonia K. H. Barnard, 1955
- Arabunnachiltonia King, 2009
- Austrochiltonia Hurley, 1958
- Chiltonia Stebbing, 1899
- Phreatochiltonia Zeidler, 1991
- Wangiannachiltonia King, 2009
