= Glyphoglossus yunnanensis =

Conservation status
- Least Concern (IUCN 3.1)

Scientific classification
- Kingdom: Animalia
- Phylum: Chordata
- Class: Amphibia
- Order: Anura
- Family: Microhylidae
- Genus: Glyphoglossus
- Species: G. yunnanensis

Binomial name
- Glyphoglossus yunnanensis (Boulenger, 1919)

Synonyms
- Calluella yunnanensis Boulenger, 1919; Kaluella yunnanensis (Boulenger, 1919); Calluella ocellata Liu, 1950

Species of frog

Glyphoglossus yunnanensis, also known as Yunnan squat frog or Yunnan small narrow-mouthed frog, is a species of frog in the family Microhylidae. It is found in southern China (Yunnan, southern Sichuan, and western Guizhou) and northern Vietnam; it probably occurs in adjacent Laos and in eastern Myanmar.

Glyphoglossus yunnanensis occurs in a very wide variety of habitats in hilly areas at elevations of 400–2,400 m (1,300–7,900 ft) above sea level. Breeding takes place in pools and paddy fields. G. yunnanensis is common in China. It is threatened by habitat destruction and degradation caused by human settlements. Its range overlaps with many protected areas.
