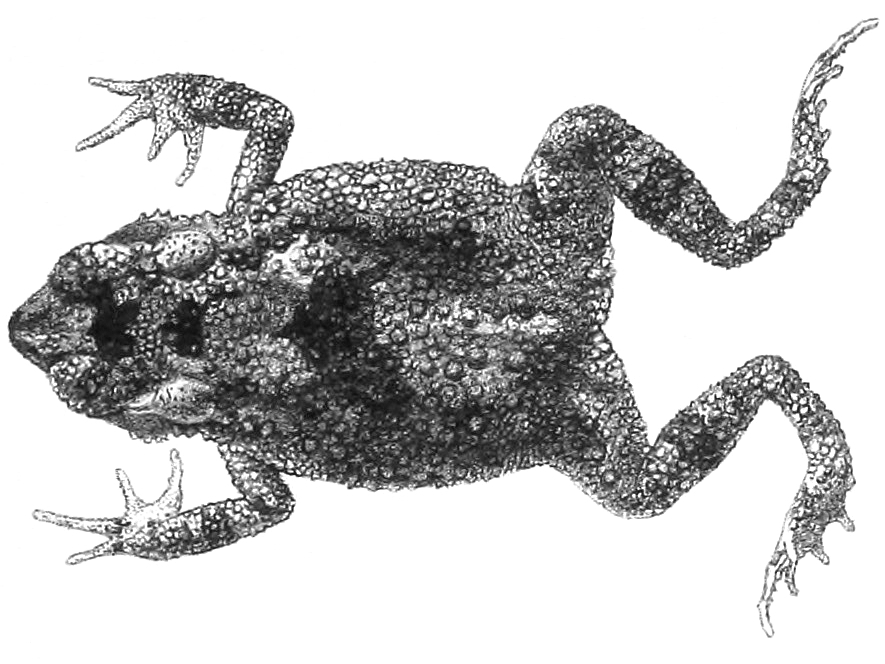

Conservation status
- Least Concern (IUCN 3.1)

Scientific classification
- Kingdom: Animalia
- Phylum: Chordata
- Class: Amphibia
- Order: Anura
- Family: Bufonidae
- Genus: Ingerophrynus
- Species: I. macrotis

Binomial name
- Ingerophrynus macrotis (Boulenger, 1887)

Synonyms
- Bufo macrotis Boulenger, 1887

= Ingerophrynus macrotis =

Species of amphibian

Ingerophrynus macrotis is a toad species of the family Bufonidae that is native to Cambodia, Laos, Malaysia, Myanmar, Thailand, Vietnam. Its presence in China is uncertain.

== Characteristics ==
Crown without bony ridges; snout short, truncated; interorbital space flat, as broad as the upper eyelid; tympanum very distinct, vertically oval, quite as large as the eye and close to it. First finger a little longer than second; toes barely half webbed, with irregular spinose tubercles beneath, from which the so-called subarticular are hardly distinguishable; two small metatarsal tubercles; no tarsal fold. The tarso-metatarsal tubercle reaches the tympanum or the eye. Upper parts studded with round tubercles of various sizes; parotoids prominent, subcircular. Grey-brown or olive above, with irregular dark brown spots, vertical bars on the upper lip, and cross bands on the limbs; lower surfaces dirty white, with darker spots; the male's throat brown. Male with a subgular vocal sac and, during the nuptial period, black rugosities on the inner fingers.

== Distribution and habitat ==
In Southeast Asia it is found up to 300 m (1,000 ft) above sea level. In the northwestern part of its range it is found up to an altitude of 2,350 m (10,000 ft). It tolerates human-caused disturbance in its native habitat to some extent.

Its natural habitats are subtropical or tropical dry forests, subtropical or tropical moist lowland forests, subtropical or tropical moist montane forests, subtropical or tropical moist shrubland, and intermittent freshwater marshes.
