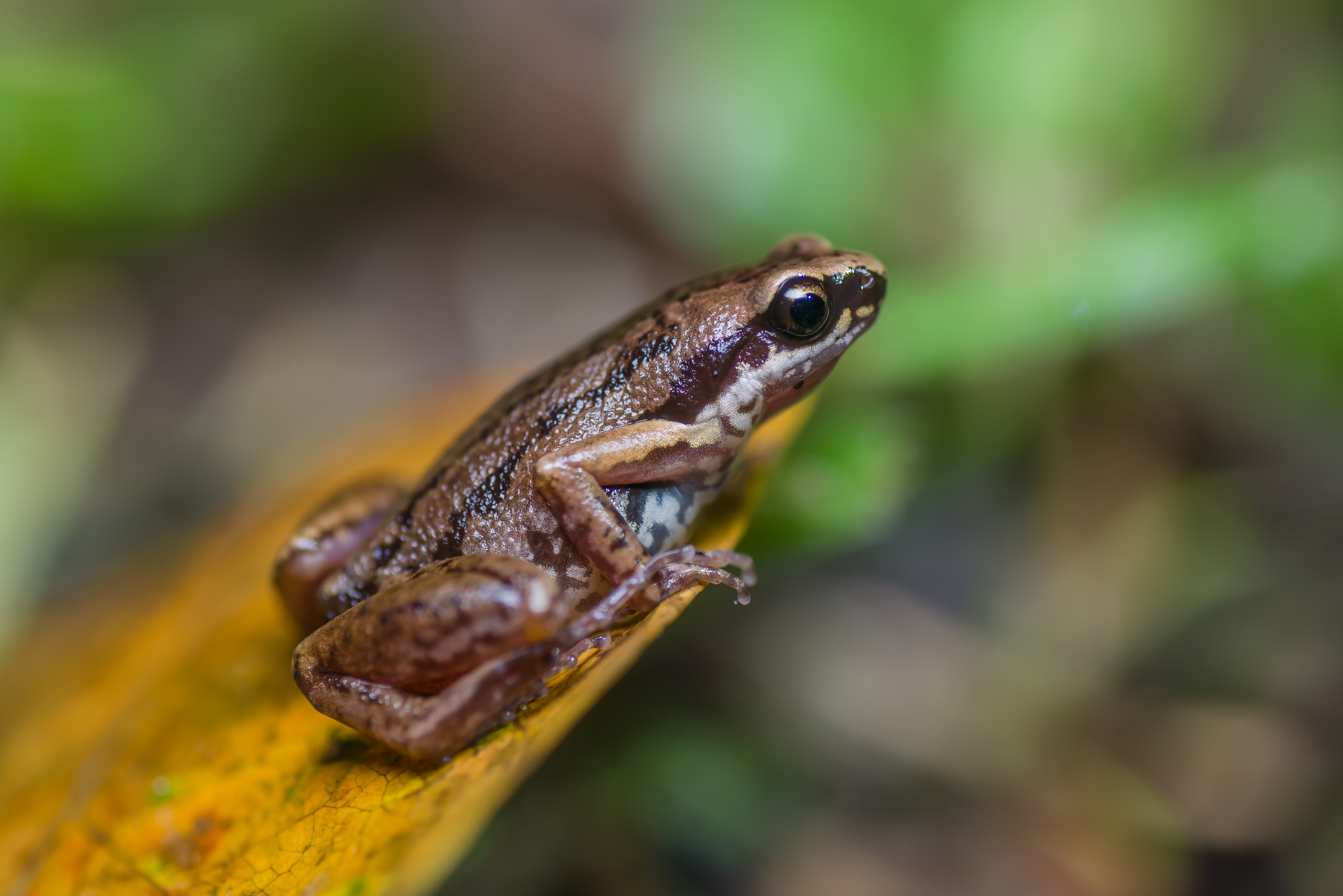
- From Khao Luang National Park

Conservation status
- Least Concern (IUCN 3.1)

Scientific classification
- Kingdom: Animalia
- Phylum: Chordata
- Class: Amphibia
- Order: Anura
- Family: Microhylidae
- Genus: Micryletta
- Species: M. erythropoda

Binomial name
- Micryletta erythropoda ( Tarkhnishvili, 1994)

Synonyms
- Microhyla erythropoda Tarkhnishvili, 1994

= Micryletta erythropoda =

Species of frog

Micryletta erythropoda, commonly known as the Mada paddy frog, is a species of frog in the family Microhylidae. It is known from Myanmar, Thailand, and Vietnam. Its natural habitats are swamps, freshwater marshes, and intermittent freshwater marshes. While formerly classified in the genus Microhyla, a 2018 study found it to belong to the genus Micryletta instead. A study performed in 2019 found that several Micryletta populations in southern Myanmar and Thailand that were formerly assigned to M. inornata actually belong to M. erythropoda; prior to this, M. erythropoda was considered endemic to Vietnam.

== Sources ==
- van Dijk, P.P.; Bain, R. (2004). "Micryletta erythropoda". IUCN Red List of Threatened Species. 2004 e.T57880A11685250. doi:10.2305/IUCN.UK.2004.RLTS.T57880A11685250.en.
- Tarkhnishvili, D.N., 1994. Amphibian communities of the Southern Viet Nam: Preliminary data. - Journal of Bengal Natural History Society, New Series. 13(1): 3-62.
