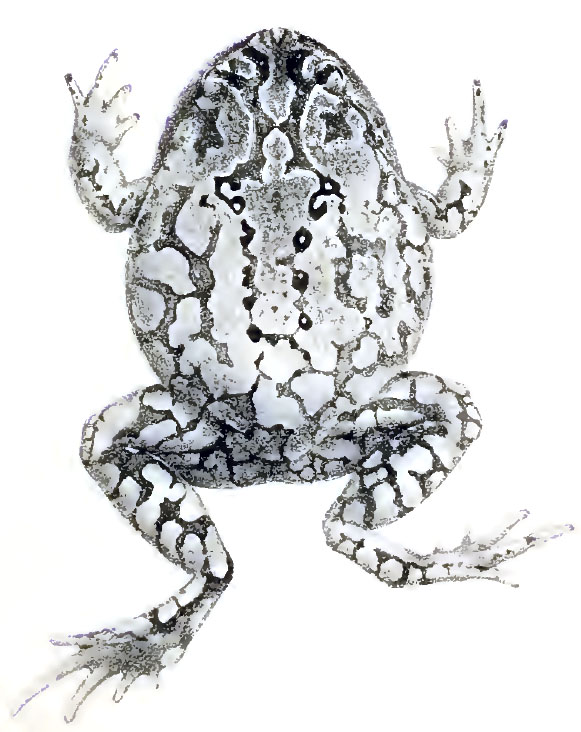
- Holotype of Glyphoglossus brooksii

Conservation status
- Least Concern (IUCN 3.1)

Scientific classification
- Kingdom: Animalia
- Phylum: Chordata
- Class: Amphibia
- Order: Anura
- Family: Microhylidae
- Genus: Glyphoglossus
- Species: G. brooksii

Binomial name
- Glyphoglossus brooksii (Boulenger, 1904)

Synonyms
- Colpoglossus Brooksii Boulenger, 1904; Calluella brooksii (Boulenger, 1904)

= Glyphoglossus brooksii =

Species of frog

Glyphoglossus brooksii is a species of frog in the family Microhylidae. It is endemic to Borneo and found in Kalimantan (Indonesia) and Sarawak (Malaysia). Its common names are Brooks' squat frog and Brooks' burrowing frog. It is named after Mr. Cecil J. Brooks who collected the holotype "in a hole whilst prospecting" in Bidi, Sarawak.

== Description ==
Glyphoglossus brooksii females can grow to 72 mm (2.8 in) in snout–vent length. The dorsum is granulate and tan to brown in colour with a complex dark brown pattern. The belly is cream or yellow. The body is robust with short and wide head. Limbs are short and thick; the toes basally webbed, with fringes of skin seen along toes.

Glyphoglossus brooksii is a burrowing frog inhabiting the leaf litter. Its life history is poorly known. Males call during the day, during heavy showers. Eggs are relatively small and pigmented.

== Habitat and conservation ==
Glyphoglossus brooksii occurs in lowland rainforests, mid-elevation dipterocarp forests, and heath forests. Breeding habitats are unknown but are presumably similar to its relatives, involving larval development in standing bodies of water. It is threatened by habitat loss caused by clear-cutting and leading to fragmentation of its habitat. It occurs in a number of protected areas.
