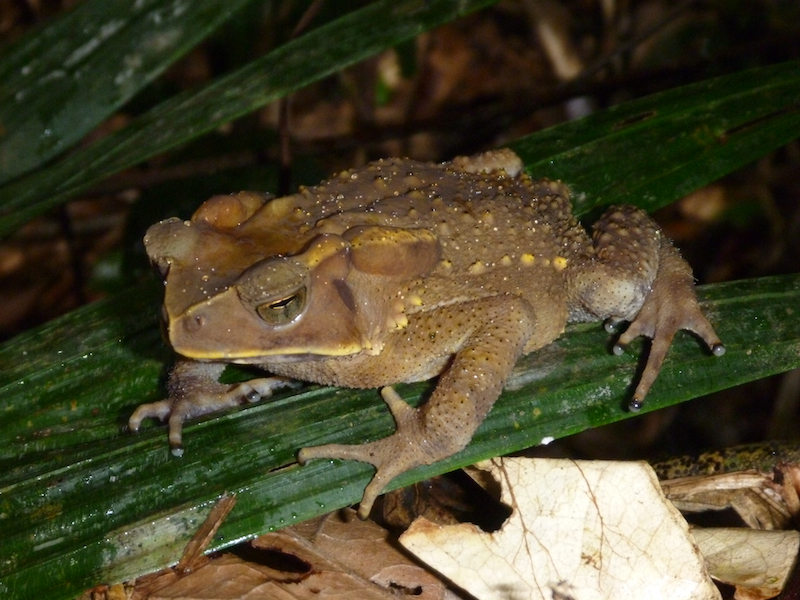

Conservation status
- Least Concern (IUCN 3.1)

Scientific classification
- Kingdom: Animalia
- Phylum: Chordata
- Class: Amphibia
- Order: Anura
- Family: Bufonidae
- Genus: Ingerophrynus
- Species: I. celebensis

Binomial name
- Ingerophrynus celebensis (Günther, 1859)

Synonyms
- Bufo celebensis Günther, 1859

= Sulawesian toad =

Species of amphibian

The Sulawesian toad or Celebes toad (Ingerophrynus celebensis) is a species of toad in the family Bufonidae. It is endemic to Sulawesi, Indonesia. It is a common and abundant species found in a wide range of habitats, including primary rainforest, secondary forest, plantations, cultivated land and towns. Breeding takes place in ponds, paddy fields, and pools within slow-moving streams.
