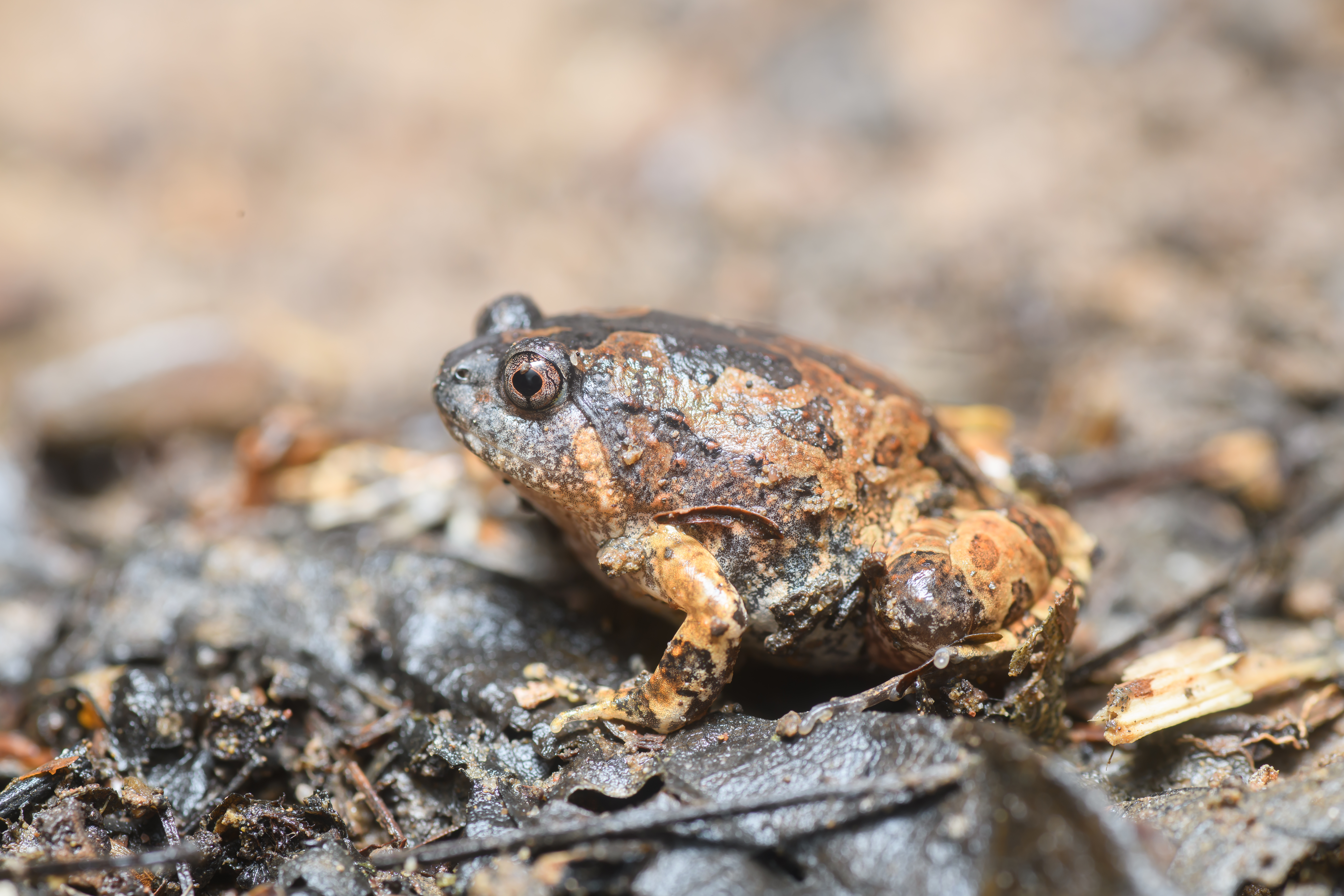

Conservation status
- Least Concern (IUCN 3.1)

Scientific classification
- Kingdom: Animalia
- Phylum: Chordata
- Class: Amphibia
- Order: Anura
- Family: Microhylidae
- Genus: Glyphoglossus
- Species: G. guttulatus

Binomial name
- Glyphoglossus guttulatus (Blyth, 1856)

Synonyms
- Megalophrys guttulata Blyth, 1856 "1855"; Calluella guttulata (Blyth, 1856)

= Glyphoglossus guttulatus =

Species of frog

Glyphoglossus guttulatus, also known as Burmese squat frog, blotched burrowing frog, orange burrowing frog, or striped spadefoot frog, is a species of frog in the family Microhylidae. It is found in Myanmar, Thailand, Cambodia, Laos, and Vietnam. It is uncertain whether it is present in the Peninsular Malaysia.

Glyphoglossus guttulatus occurs in lowland forests at elevations of 150–400 m (490–1,310 ft) above sea level. It is most commonly observed on leaf litter near rivers. Breeding is explosive and takes place in water. The tadpoles are suspension feeders.

This species can occur locally in great numbers during the breeding and then effectively disappear. It is probably threatened by habitat degradation caused by expansion of agricultural land, roads, and human settlements. It is harvested for human consumption in Laos and Cambodia. It has been recorded in a number of protected areas, and many more protected areas overlap with its predicted range.
