= Ingerophrynus kumquat =

Conservation status
- Endangered (IUCN 3.1)

Scientific classification
- Kingdom: Animalia
- Phylum: Chordata
- Class: Amphibia
- Order: Anura
- Family: Bufonidae
- Genus: Ingerophrynus
- Species: I. kumquat

Binomial name
- Ingerophrynus kumquat (Das & Lim, 2000)

Synonyms
- Bufo kumquat Das & Lim, 2000

Species of amphibian

Ingerophrynus kumquat is a species of toad in the family Bufonidae. It is endemic to the Selangor state, Peninsular Malaysia, where it is only known from peat swamps near its type locality. This species is a peat swamp specialist that is locally abundant but is threatened by habitat loss caused by drainage and reclamation of peat swamps for agriculture.
