= Chiltonia =

Scientific classification
- Domain: Eukaryota
- Kingdom: Animalia
- Phylum: Arthropoda
- Class: Malacostraca
- Order: Amphipoda
- Family: Chiltoniidae
- Genus: Chiltonia; Stebbing, 1899

Species
- Chiltonia enderbyensis Hurley, 1954; Chiltonia mihiwaka (Chilton, 1898); Chiltonia minuta Bousfield, 1964; Chiltonia rivertonensis Hurley, 1954

Genus of crustaceans

Chiltonia is a genus of amphipod crustaceans endemic to New Zealand. Four species are known, three of which live in fresh waters. They were first discovered by Charles Chilton in 1898 and the genus Chiltonia was erected the following year by T. R. R. Stebbing in Chilton's honour.

== Chiltonia mihiwaka ==
Chiltonia mihiwaka was the first of the species of Chiltonia to be described, when Charles Chilton named it in 1898 as a species in the genus Hyalella. Subsequent taxonomic splits have restricted the name to the populations in the Southland and Otago regions in New Zealand's South Island. Chilton's original material was collected on Mihiwaka, a hill near Port Chalmers, Otago. Adults are approximately 5 mm (0.20 in) long, 1.25 mm (0.049 in) wide and 2 mm (0.079 in) deep.

== Chiltonia enderbyensis ==
Chiltonia. enderbyensis was named by Hurley in 1954 for the populations of Chiltonia living on New Zealand's subantarctic islands, namely Enderby Island (one of the Auckland Islands) and Campbell Island. Males are approximately 8 mm (0.31 in) long, 1.75 mm (0.069 in) wide and 1.5 mm (0.059 in) deep, while females are 6–7 mm (0.24–0.28 in) long, 1.5 mm (0.059 in) wide and 1.5 mm (0.059 in) deep.

== Chiltonia rivertonensis ==
Chiltonia rivertonensis was also named by Hurley in 1954, for a population living in small streams near Riverton, Southland. In November 2018 the Department of Conservation classified C. rivertonensis as "Nationally Critical" under the New Zealand Threat Classification System. The species was judged as meeting the criteria for Nationally Critical threat status as a result of it occupying only in one location, the total area of which is less than 1 hectare. It is considered as being "Data Poor" and "Range Restricted" under that system.

== Chiltonia minuta ==
Chiltonia minuta was the last of the four species to be described, and its affinities remain unclear. Whereas all the other species occur in fresh water, C. minuta was collected under kelp on a beach on Campbell Island.

== Australia ==
Two species from Australia, C. subtenuis and C. australis were described by Sayce in 1901 and 1902, respectively. Both are now considered to belong to the related genus Austrochiltonia.
