= Ingerophrynus claviger =

Conservation status
- Least Concern (IUCN 3.1)

Scientific classification
- Kingdom: Animalia
- Phylum: Chordata
- Class: Amphibia
- Order: Anura
- Family: Bufonidae
- Genus: Ingerophrynus
- Species: I. claviger

Binomial name
- Ingerophrynus claviger (Peters, 1863)

Synonyms
- Bufo claviger Peters, 1863

Species of amphibian

Ingerophrynus claviger is a species of toad in the family Bufonidae. It is endemic to Indonesia where it is found on Sumatra and Nias island. It is found in lowland forests. It is threatened by habitat loss.
