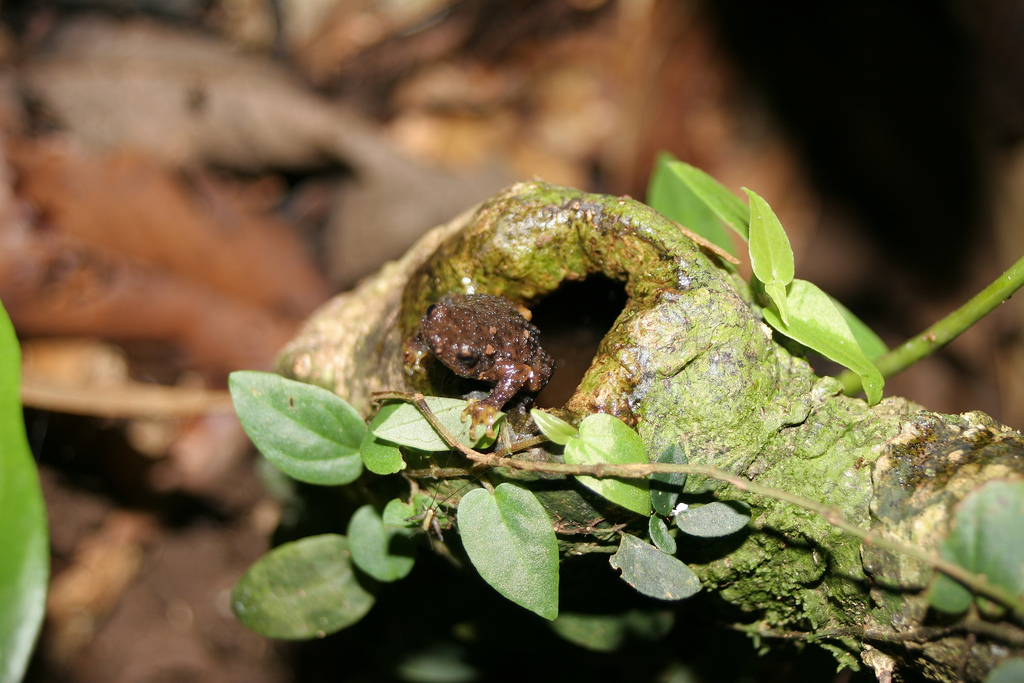

Conservation status
- Least Concern (IUCN 3.1)

Scientific classification
- Kingdom: Animalia
- Phylum: Chordata
- Class: Amphibia
- Order: Anura
- Family: Microhylidae
- Genus: Metaphrynella
- Species: M. sundana

Binomial name
- Metaphrynella sundana (Peters, 1867)

Synonyms
- Calohyla sundana Peters, 1867

= Metaphrynella sundana =

Species of frog

Metaphrynella sundana (Borneo treefrog or Bornean tree hole frog) is a species of frog in the family Microhylidae. It is endemic to Borneo and found in Brunei, Indonesia, and Malaysia.

== Description ==
Metaphrynella sundana are small frogs; adults measure up to about 25 mm (0.98 in) in snout–vent length. The body is stocky and the limbs are moderately short. Skin has rounded tubercles that are larger on the sides. Colouration and texture show considerable variation.

The male has a median subgular vocal sac. Males call at night from tree holes that are about 1–5 m (3 ft 3 in – 16 ft 5 in) meters above the ground. Males are able to adjust their call to the resonance frequency of the tree hole they call from.

== Habitat and conservation ==
The species' natural habitats are lowland primary rainforests to about 700 m (2,300 ft) asl. It is a common frog in primary and secondary rainforests. Reproduction takes place in tree holes with water. It is threatened by habitat loss from clear-cutting.
