= Glyphoglossus minutus =

Conservation status
- Near Threatened (IUCN 3.1)

Scientific classification
- Kingdom: Animalia
- Phylum: Chordata
- Class: Amphibia
- Order: Anura
- Family: Microhylidae
- Genus: Glyphoglossus
- Species: G. minutus

Binomial name
- Glyphoglossus minutus (Das, Yaakob, and Lim, 2004)

Synonyms
- Calluella minuta Das, Yaakob, and Lim, 2004

Species of frog

Glyphoglossus minutus, also known as the minute narrow-mouthed frog, is a species of frog in the family Microhylidae. The specific name minutus alludes to the small size of this species. It is endemic to Peninsular Malaysia and only known from four localities in the state of Pahang: two inside the Taman Negara National Park (including its type locality), one in the Krau Wildlife Reserve, and Gunung Senyum. It probably occurs more widely in central Peninsular Malaysia.

== Description ==
The type series consists of three specimens: two adult males measuring 31–33 mm (1.2–1.3 in) and one adult female measuring 26 mm (1.0 in) in snout–vent length. The body is rounded and roughly triangular in shape. The head is wider than it is long. The snout is obtusely pointed. The tympanum is distinct. The limbs are short. The fingers have pointed tips and are free of webbing. The toes are rounded and are partially webbed. The dorsum is granular with rounded warts and clay or yellowish-brown in colour. There are warm sepia or dark grey-brown markings. The flanks are slightly darker.

== Habitat and conservation ==
Glyphoglossus minutus occurs among the leaf litter in lowland dipterocarp forests, mainly in swampy areas. It has also been found at road sides. It feeds on ants. Breeding is explosive, during which time this species can be abundant.

This species occurs in multiple, well-protected areas. Outside of the protected areas, however, it is threatened by habitat loss caused by logging and agricultural expansion, in particularly related to oil palm plantations.
