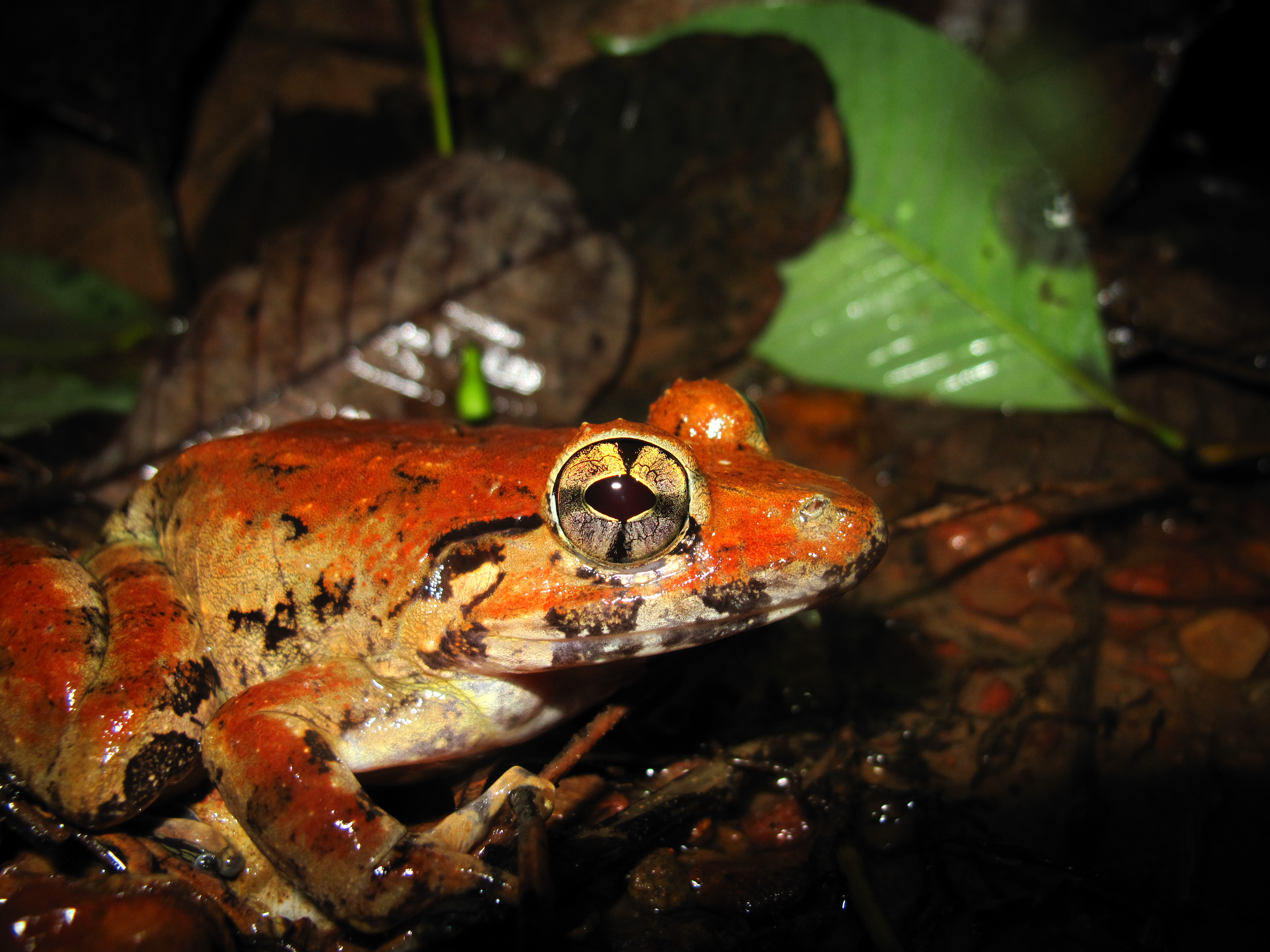

Conservation status
- Least Concern (IUCN 3.1)

Scientific classification
- Kingdom: Animalia
- Phylum: Chordata
- Class: Amphibia
- Order: Anura
- Family: Dicroglossidae
- Genus: Limnonectes
- Species: L. blythii

Binomial name
- Limnonectes blythii (Boulenger, 1920)

Synonyms
- Rana macrodon var. blythii Boulenger, 1920

= Blyth's river frog =

Species of amphibian

Blyth's river frog (Limnonectes blythii), also known as Blyth's frog, giant Asian river frog or (ambiguously) giant frog, is a species of frog in the family Dicroglossidae found from Myanmar through western Thailand and the Malay Peninsula (Malaysia, Singapore) to Sumatra and Borneo (Indonesia). Earlier records from Laos and Vietnam are considered misidentifications.

== Description ==
Blyth's river frog is a large frog. Females grow to a snout–vent length of 90–260 mm (3.5–10.2 in) and males to 85–125 mm (3.3–4.9 in). Large adults can weigh more than 1 kg (2.2 lb). The skin is smooth on the dorsum, with or without scattered tubercles or longitudinal skin folds. They are brownish, grey, or yellowish above and white or yellowish below. They may or may not have a vertebral stripe on their backs.

== Habitat ==
These frogs inhabit streams with gravel and rocks in primary and secondary evergreen forest. Males build a nesting hollow in a sandy stream bed area, and the tadpoles develop in streams. They can also be found far away from streams.

== Use and conservation ==
The major threat to this species is collection for food, both for local consumption and for trade. It is also locally impacted by habitat loss.

== Gallery ==
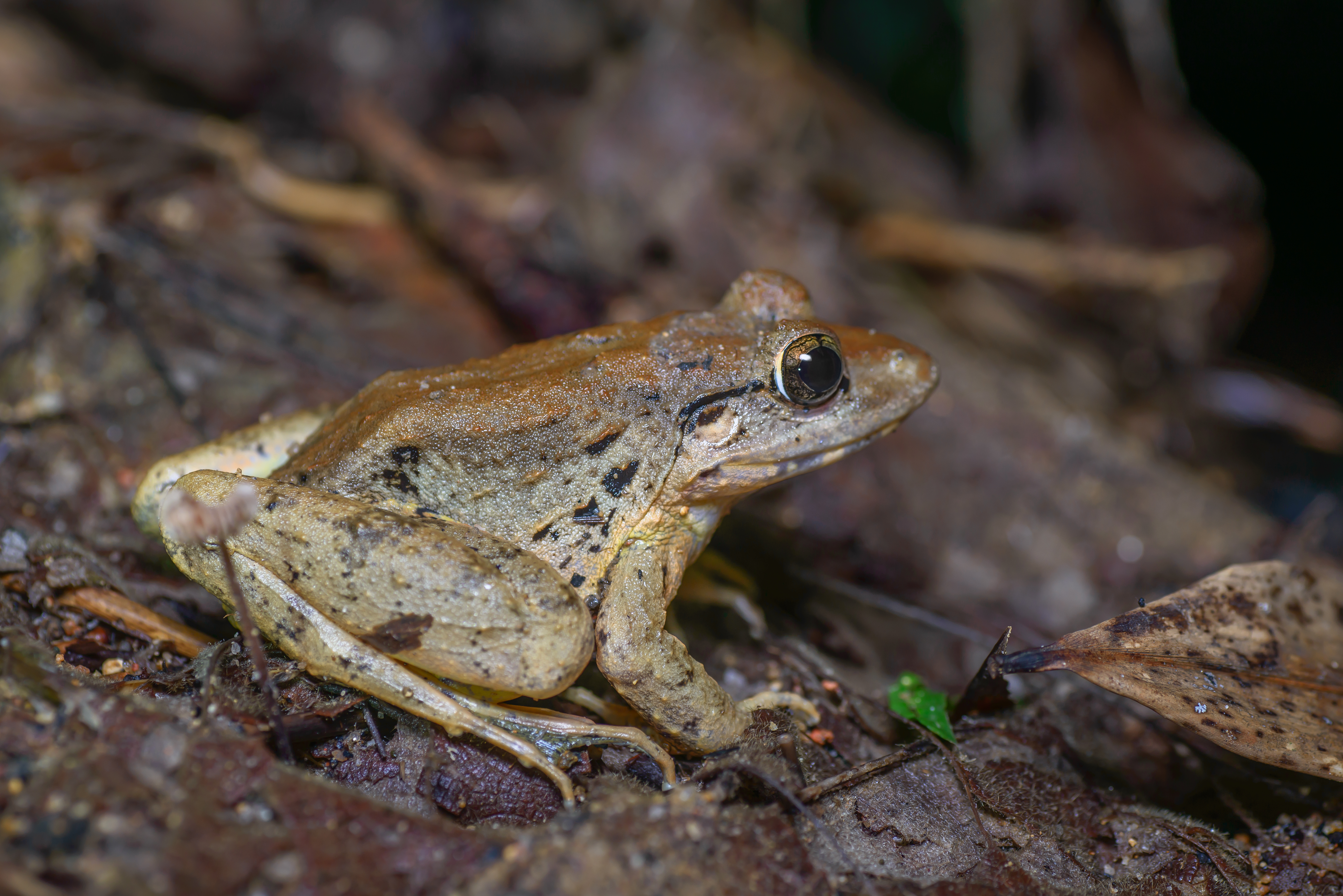
Limnonectes blythii (subadult) - Khao Sok National Park
