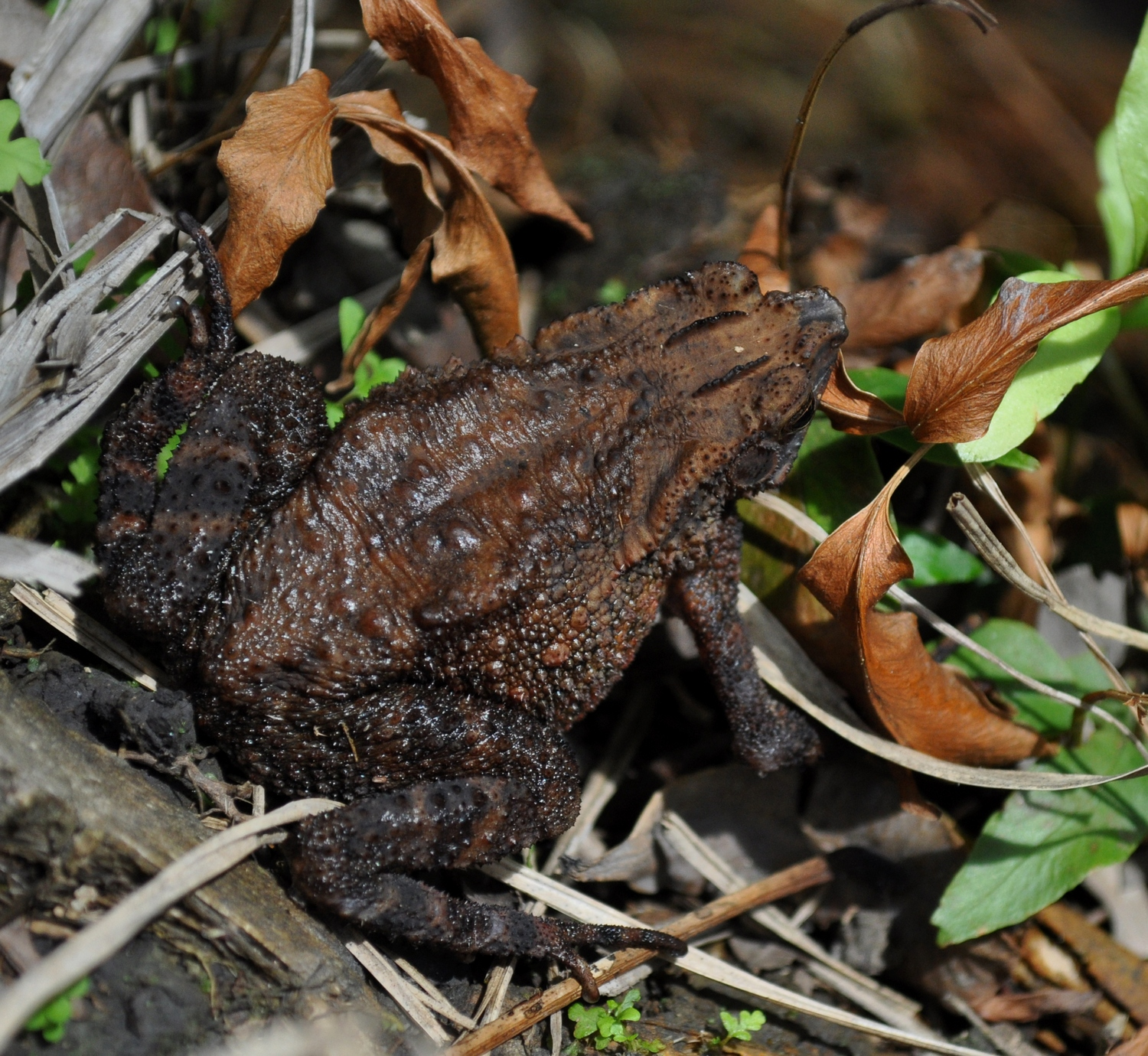
- Ingerophrynus quadriporcatus from West Kalimantan, Indonesia

Conservation status
- Least Concern (IUCN 3.1)

Scientific classification
- Kingdom: Animalia
- Phylum: Chordata
- Class: Amphibia
- Order: Anura
- Family: Bufonidae
- Genus: Ingerophrynus
- Species: I. quadriporcatus

Binomial name
- Ingerophrynus quadriporcatus (Boulenger, 1887)

Synonyms
- Bufo quadriporcatus Boulenger, 1887

= Ingerophrynus quadriporcatus =

Species of amphibian

Ingerophrynus quadriporcatus is a species of toad in the family Bufonidae. Its common names are long-glanded toad, four-ridged toad and greater Malacca toad. It is found in Peninsular Malaysia, Singapore, Borneo (Sabah, Brunei, Sarawak, and Kalimantan), Sumatra, and the Natuna Islands. Its natural habitats are swamp forests, but it has also been found on rubber plantations. It breeds in standing water.

== Description ==
Male Ingerophrynus quadriporcatus grow to a snout–vent length of about 48 mm (1.9 in) and females to 53–63 mm (2.1–2.5 in). They have a distinct tympanum. The dorsum is dark or light brown above and on sides, usually uniform in colour, and without distinct markings. Ventral colour is yellowish brown, possibly with dark spots. Skin on top of head and body is covered with many conical spines.

== Conservation ==
Ingerophrynus quadriporcatus may be common in suitable swampy habitats, but it is not abundant. It is threatened by habitat loss caused by expanding oil palm plantations, infrastructure development, and logging.
