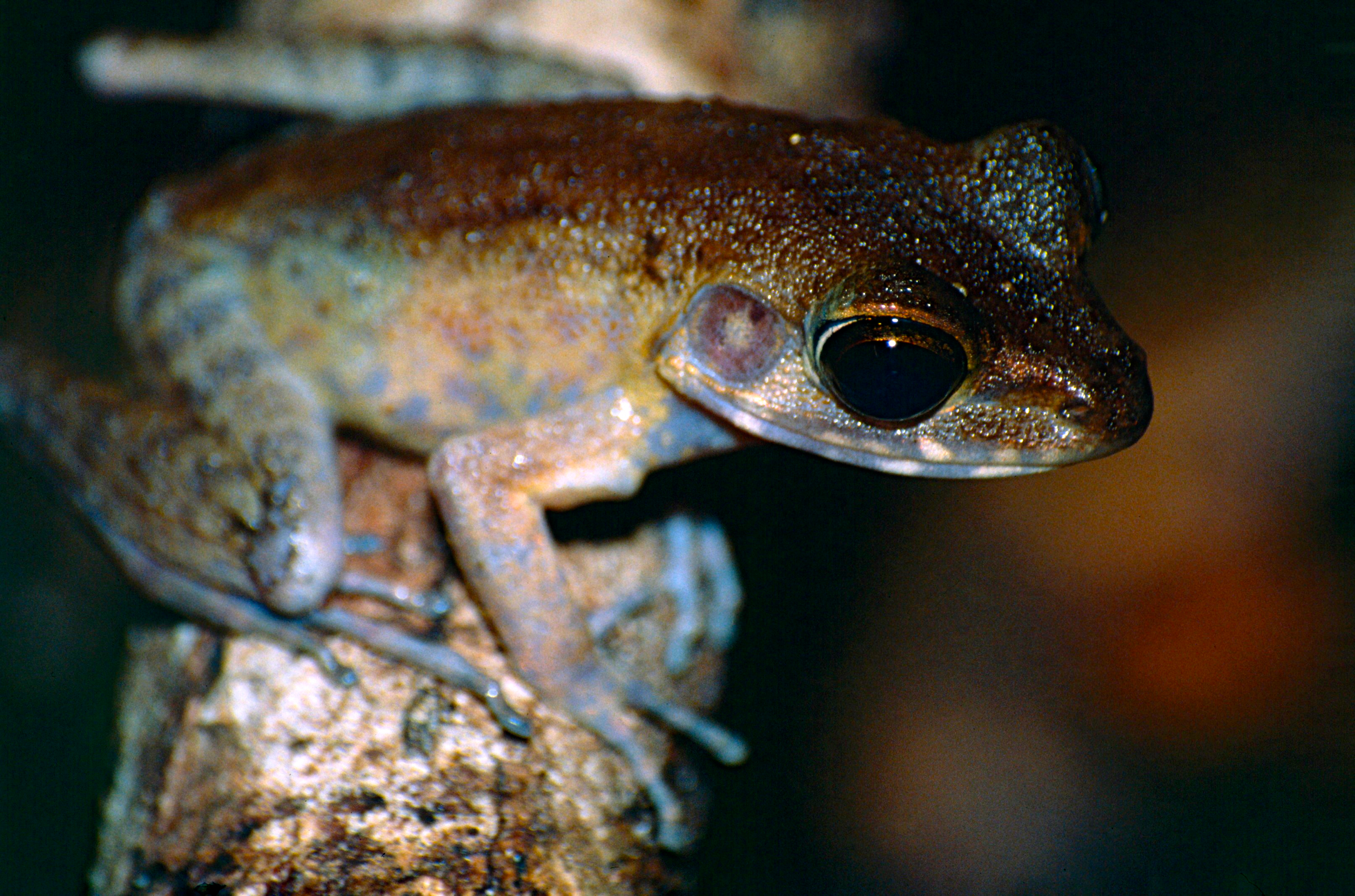

Conservation status
- Least Concern (IUCN 3.1)

Scientific classification
- Kingdom: Animalia
- Phylum: Chordata
- Class: Amphibia
- Order: Anura
- Family: Ranidae
- Genus: Pulchrana
- Species: P. baramica

Binomial name
- Pulchrana baramica (Boettger, 1900)

Synonyms
- Rana baramica Boettger, 1900; Hylarana baramica (Boettger, 1900)

= Pulchrana baramica =

Species of amphibian

Pulchrana baramica, the Baram River frog, brown marsh frog, or masked rough-sided frog, is a species of "true frog", family Ranidae. It is found in the Malay Peninsula, including the extreme south Thailand, Peninsular Malaysia, and Singapore, and in the Malay Archipelago, including Borneo (Brunei, Kalimantan, and East Malaysia), and the Indonesian islands Java, Sumatra, and Bangka Island. Its type locality is the Baram River in Sarawak, Malaysia, giving it one of its common names. Its natural habitats are tropical moist lowland forests and swamps. It is not considered threatened by the IUCN.
