= Glyphoglossus volzi =

Conservation status
- Least Concern (IUCN 3.1)

Scientific classification
- Kingdom: Animalia
- Phylum: Chordata
- Class: Amphibia
- Order: Anura
- Family: Microhylidae
- Genus: Glyphoglossus
- Species: G. volzi

Binomial name
- Glyphoglossus volzi (van Kampen, 1905)

Synonyms
- Dyscophina volzi van Kampen, 1905; Calluella volzi (van Kampen, 1905)

Species of frog

Glyphoglossus volzi, also known as Sumatra squat frog, is a species of frog in the family Microhylidae. It is endemic to Sumatra, Indonesia. The specific name volzi honours Dr Walter Volz, a Swiss zoologist and traveller.

Glyphoglossus volzi is a poorly known species occurring in lowland primary forest at elevations of 50–980 m (160–3,220 ft) above sea level. It is only known from few specimens, but this likely reflects the lack of suitable sampling methods for what is likely a fossorial species. It probably lays its eggs in pools of standing water on the forest floor. The main threat to this species is clear-cutting of lowland tropical rainforest for oil palm plantations, small-holder agriculture, and wood extraction. It is present in the Bukit Barisan Selatan National Park and may be present in other protected areas.
