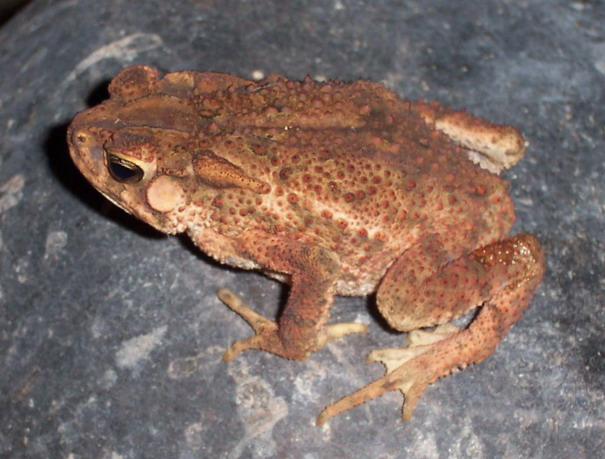

Conservation status
- Least Concern (IUCN 3.1)

Scientific classification
- Kingdom: Animalia
- Phylum: Chordata
- Class: Amphibia
- Order: Anura
- Family: Bufonidae
- Genus: Ingerophrynus
- Species: I. biporcatus

Binomial name
- Ingerophrynus biporcatus Gravenhorst, 1829

Synonyms
- Bufo cavator Barbour, 1911; Bufo biporcatus

= Crested toad =

Species of amphibian

The crested toad or double crested toad (Ingerophrynus biporcatus) is a species of toad in the family Bufonidae. It is endemic to Indonesia. Its natural habitats are subtropical or tropical moist lowland forests, rivers, plantations, rural gardens, and heavily degraded former forest. It is threatened by habitat loss.
