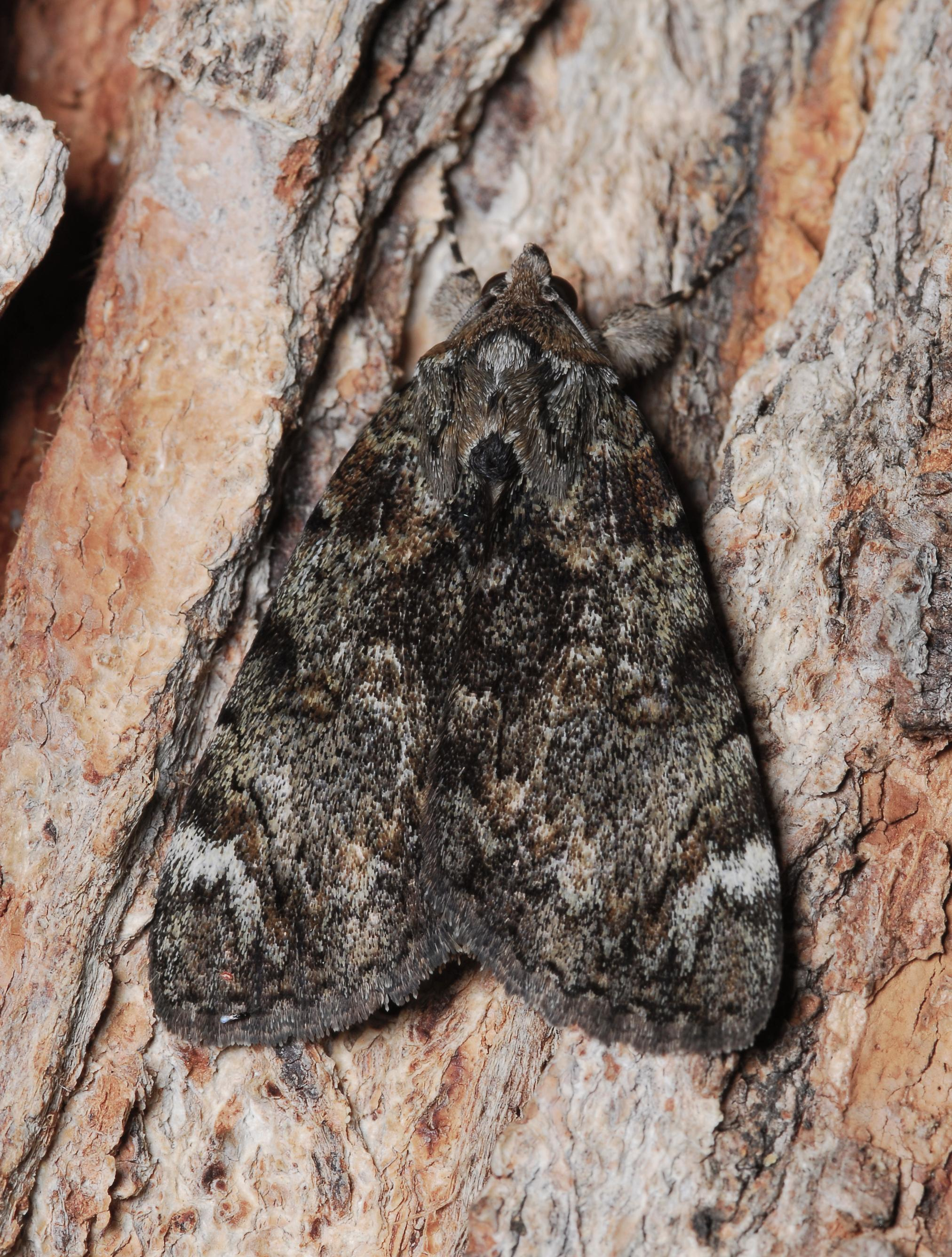

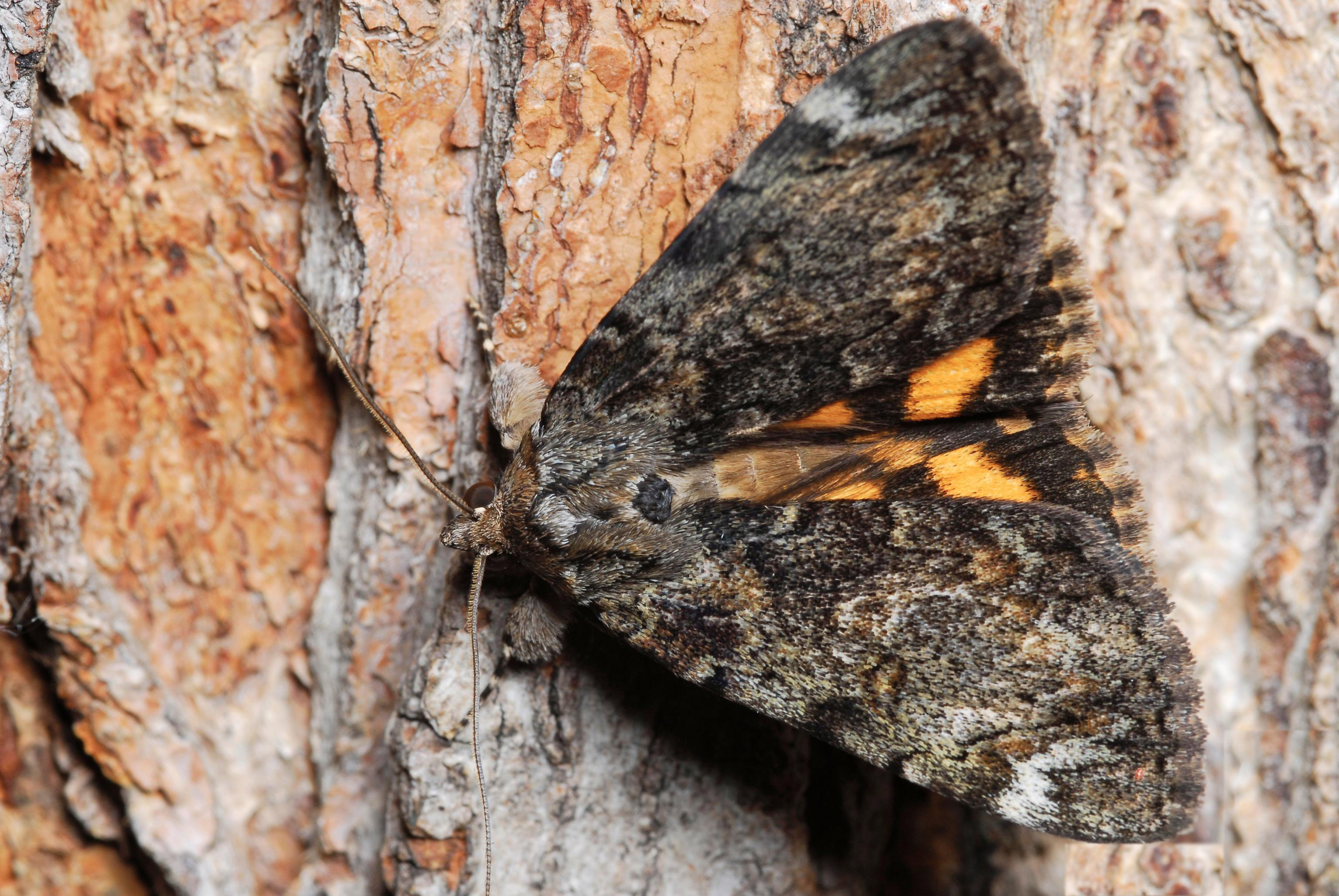

Scientific classification
- Kingdom: Animalia
- Phylum: Arthropoda
- Class: Insecta
- Order: Lepidoptera
- Superfamily: Noctuoidea
- Family: Erebidae
- Genus: Catocala
- Species: C. minuta

Binomial name
- Catocala minuta W. H. Edwards, 1864

Synonyms
- Catocala hiseri Cassino, 1918; Catocala parvula Edwards, 1864; Catocala mellitula Hulst, 1884; Catocala eureka Schwarz, 1919; Catocala obliterata Schwarz, 1919; Catocala minuta parvula; Catocala minuta mellitula

= Catocala minuta =

Little underwing

Species of moth

Catocala minuta, the little underwing, is a moth of the family Erebidae. The species was first described by William Henry Edwards in 1864. It is found in the US from New York to Florida and west to Texas and north to South Dakota, Indiana and Michigan.

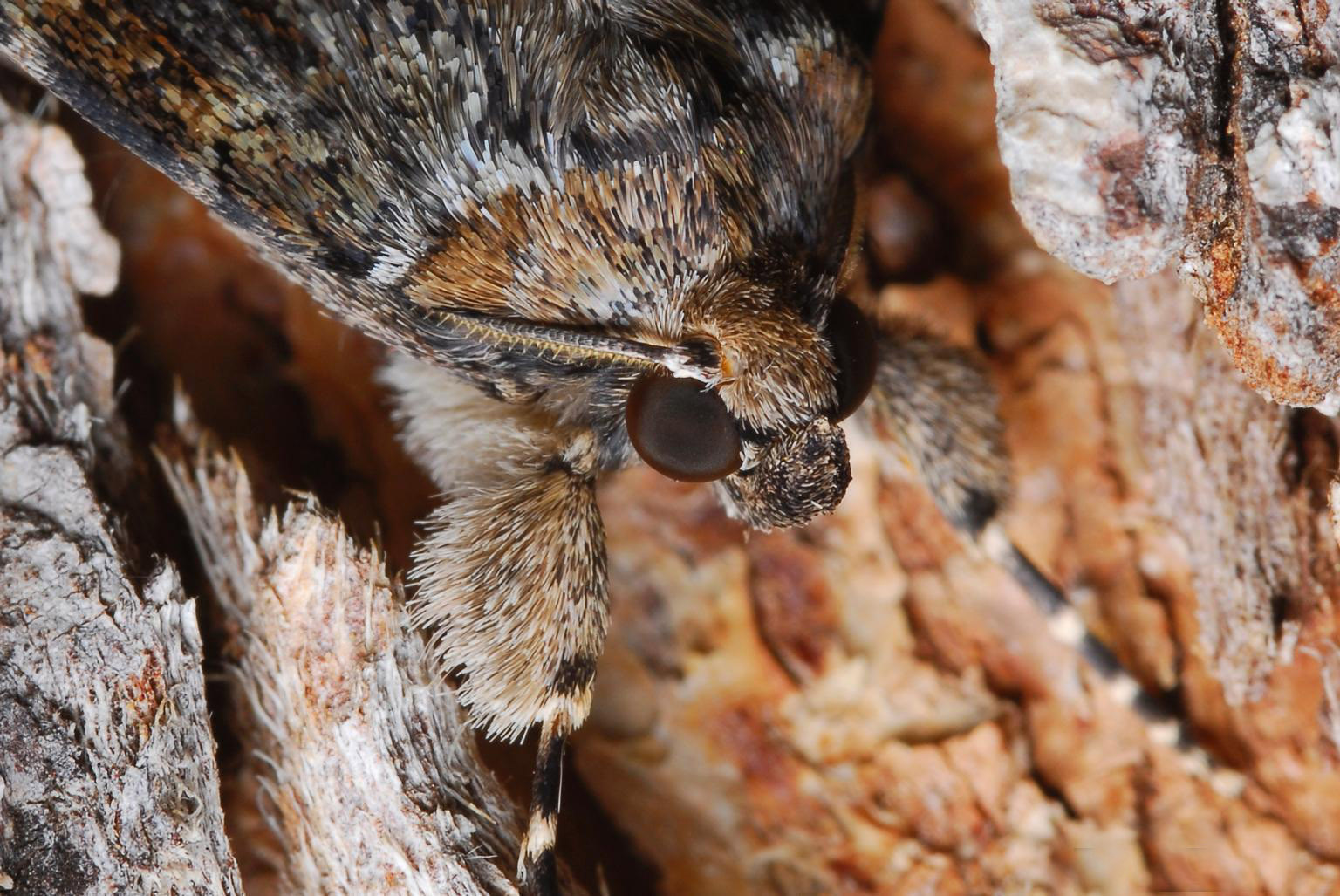

The wingspan is 35–45 mm. Adults are on wing from June to August depending on the location. There is probably one generation per year.

The larvae feed on Gleditsia aquatica and Gleditsia triacanthos.
