= Metaphrynella pollicaris =

Conservation status
- Least Concern (IUCN 3.1)

Scientific classification
- Kingdom: Animalia
- Phylum: Chordata
- Class: Amphibia
- Order: Anura
- Family: Microhylidae
- Genus: Metaphrynella
- Species: M. pollicaris

Binomial name
- Metaphrynella pollicaris (Boulenger, 1890)

Species of frog

Metaphrynella pollicaris (common name: Malaysian treefrog or Malaysian tree-hole frog) is a species of frog in the family Microhylidae. It is endemic to Peninsular Malaysia.

== Description ==
Males measure 24–41 mm (0.94–1.61 in) and females 27–28 mm (1.1–1.1 in) in snout–vent length. Dorsum is dark olive-brown above, with a variable patterning. Tympanum is hidden. Finger tips are expanded into large disks.

== Habitat and conservation ==
The species' natural habitats are evergreen rainforest and forest edges. It lives in hollows in tree trunks and bamboo, where it also reproduces. While it is secretive, the male call is distinctive and makes it surveyable. Based on the calls, it is abundant where it occurs. It abundance seems to be limited by the availability of tree holes. It can occur as low as 550 m (1,800 ft) asl, but is more common from about 900 m (3,000 ft) upwards.

It could be locally threatened by habitat loss, although it may benefit from habitat clearing that encourages the growth of giant bamboos, providing it with its microhabitat. It is known from several protected areas.
