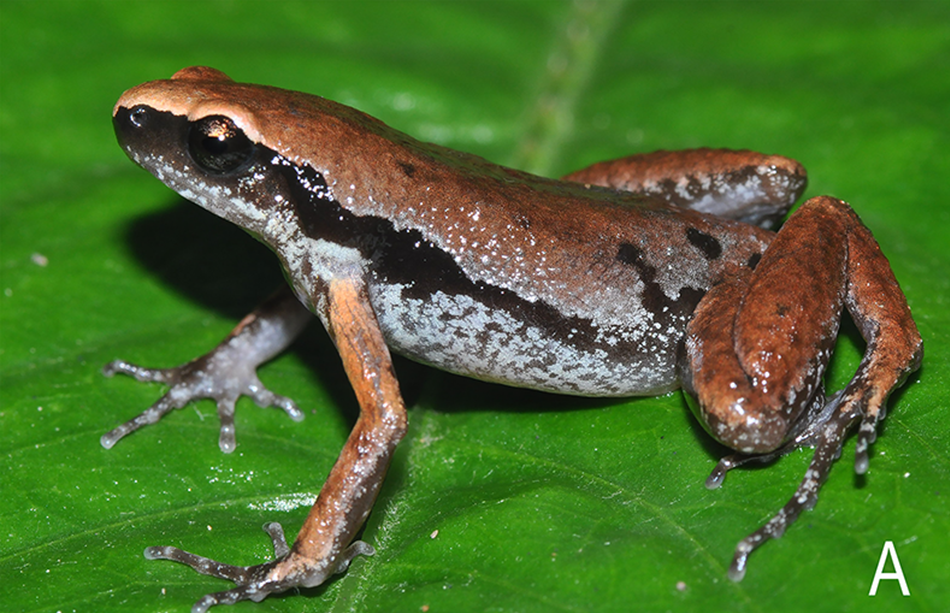
- Micryletta aishani

Scientific classification
- Kingdom: Animalia
- Phylum: Chordata
- Class: Amphibia
- Order: Anura
- Family: Microhylidae
- Subfamily: Microhylinae
- Genus: Micryletta; Dubois, 1987

Diversity
- 12 species

= Micryletta =

Genus of amphibians

Micryletta is a genus of microhylid frogs. Prior to 2018, only 3 species were recognized, but phylogenetic studies since then have found a much higher species diversity within the genus.

== Species ==
Binomial Name and Author	Common Name
Micryletta aishani Das, Garg, Hamidy, Smith, and Biju, 2019	Northeast Indian paddy frog
Micryletta dissimulans Suwannapoom, Nguyen, Pawangkhanant, Gorin, Chomdej, Che, and Poyarkov, 2020	camouflaged paddy frog
Micryletta erythropoda (Tarkhnishvili, 1994)	Mada paddy frog
Micryletta hekouensis Liu, Hou, Mo, and Rao, 2021	Hekou paddy frog
Micryletta immaculata Yang and Poyarkov, 2021	Hainan paddy frog
Micryletta inornata (Boulenger, 1890)	Deli paddy frog, False Ornate narrow-mouthed frog, Deli little pygmy, inornate froglet
Micryletta lineata (Taylor, 1962)	striped paddy frog
Micryletta melanops Poyarkov, Nguyen, Yang, and Gorin, 2021	black-eyed paddy frog
Micryletta nigromaculata Poyarkov, Nguyen, Duong, Gorin and Yang, 2018	black-spotted paddy frog
Micryletta steinegeri (Boulenger, 1909)	Stejneger's paddy frog, Stejneger's narrow-mouthed toad, paddy frog, Taiwan little pygmy frog
Micryletta subaraji Sankar, Law, Law, Shivaram, Abraham, and Chan, 2022	Subaraj's paddy frog
Micryletta sumatrana Munir, Hamidy, Matsui, Kusrini and Nishikawa, 2020
