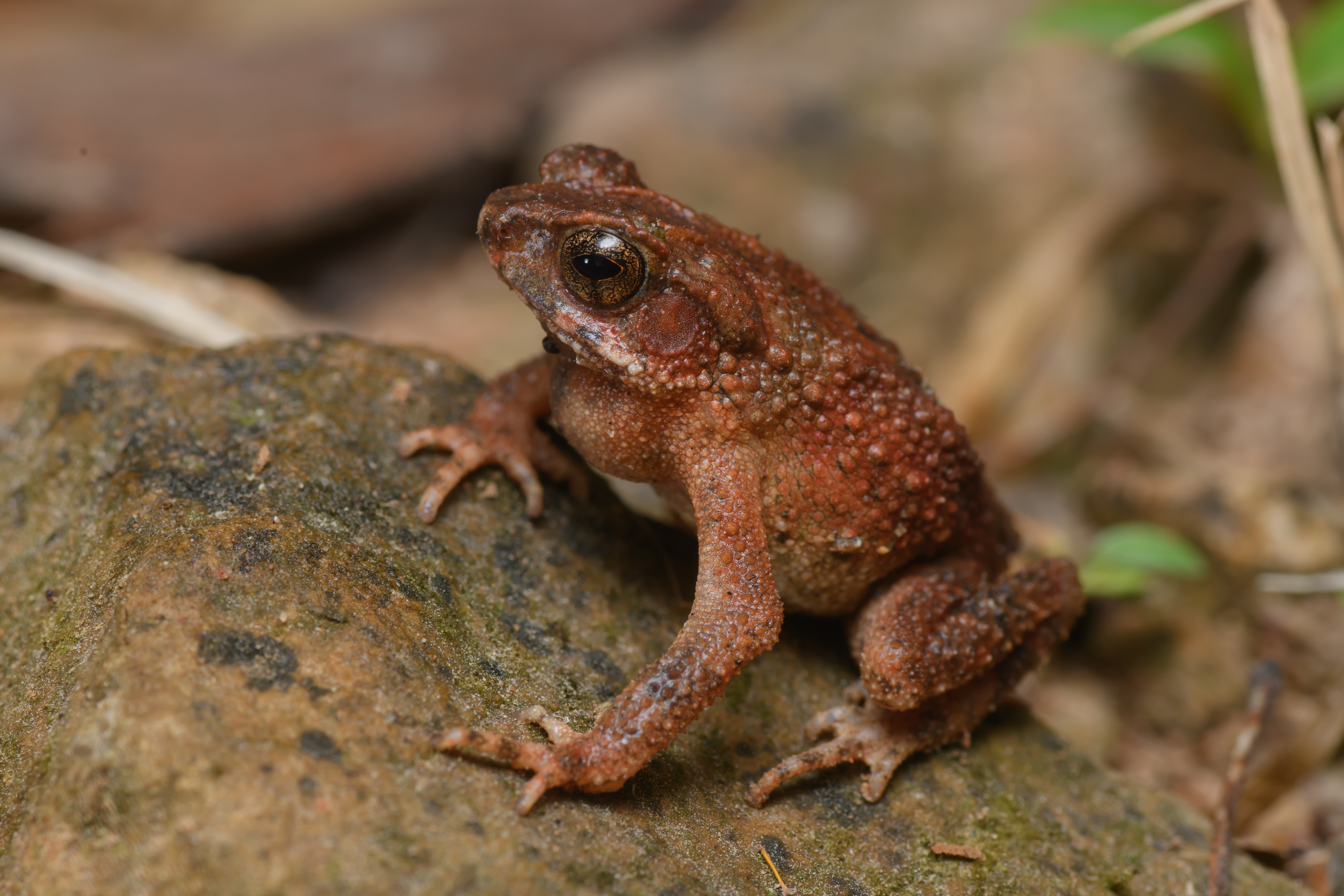

Conservation status
- Least Concern (IUCN 3.1)

Scientific classification
- Kingdom: Animalia
- Phylum: Chordata
- Class: Amphibia
- Order: Anura
- Family: Bufonidae
- Genus: Ingerophrynus
- Species: I. parvus

Binomial name
- Ingerophrynus parvus (Boulenger, 1887)

Synonyms
- Bufo parvus Boulenger, 1887

= Ingerophrynus parvus =

Species of amphibian

Ingerophrynus parvus is a species of toad in the family Bufonidae. It is found in southern Myanmar, southwestern Thailand, southwestern Cambodia, Peninsular Malaysia, and Java and Sumatra (Indonesia). Its natural habitats are primary and regenerating rainforests where it is found inhabiting streams. Breeding takes place in pools and slow-moving streams. It is common in the mainland but uncommon in Indonesia.
