= Phrynella =

Conservation status
- Least Concern (IUCN 3.1)

Scientific classification
- Kingdom: Animalia
- Phylum: Chordata
- Class: Amphibia
- Order: Anura
- Family: Microhylidae
- Subfamily: Microhylinae
- Genus: Phrynella; Boulenger, 1887
- Species: P. pulchra

Binomial name
- Phrynella pulchra Boulenger, 1887

Genus of amphibians

Phrynella is a genus of frogs in the family Microhylidae. It is monotypic, being represented by the single species, Phrynella pulchra. It is found in Indonesia, Malaysia, and Thailand. Its natural habitats are subtropical or tropical moist lowland forests and intermittent freshwater marshes. It is threatened by habitat loss.
