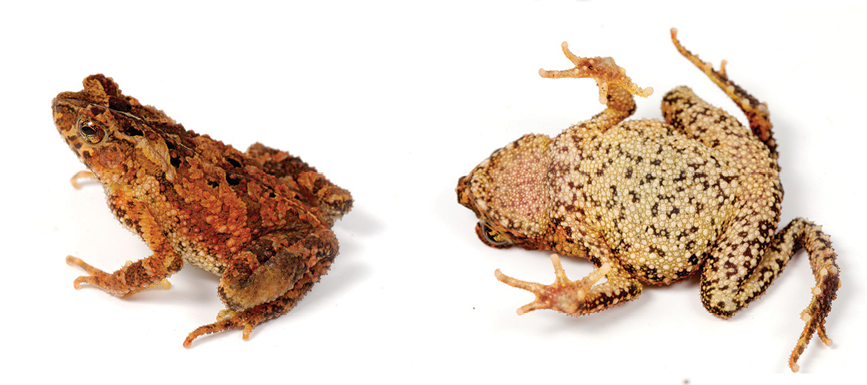

Conservation status
- Least Concern (IUCN 3.1)

Scientific classification
- Kingdom: Animalia
- Phylum: Chordata
- Class: Amphibia
- Order: Anura
- Family: Bufonidae
- Genus: Ingerophrynus
- Species: I. divergens

Binomial name
- Ingerophrynus divergens (Peters, 1871)

Synonyms
- Bufo divergens Peters, 1871

= Ingerophrynus divergens =

Species of amphibian

Ingerophrynus divergens is a species of toad in the family Bufonidae. It is found in Malay Peninsula (Thailand, presumably Malaysia), Borneo (Brunei, Indonesia, and Malaysia), Sumatra, and Natuna Islands. It occurs in well-drained lowland rainforests. It breeds in standing water and slow-moving intermittent streams. It is widespread in suitable habitat but not abundant. It is threatened by habitat loss caused by clear-cutting.

This toad species is known to be a possible host for various helminths, including Seuratascaris numidica and Pseudoacanthocephalus bufonis. Both of which are novel appearances of these parasitic organisms in I. divergens.
