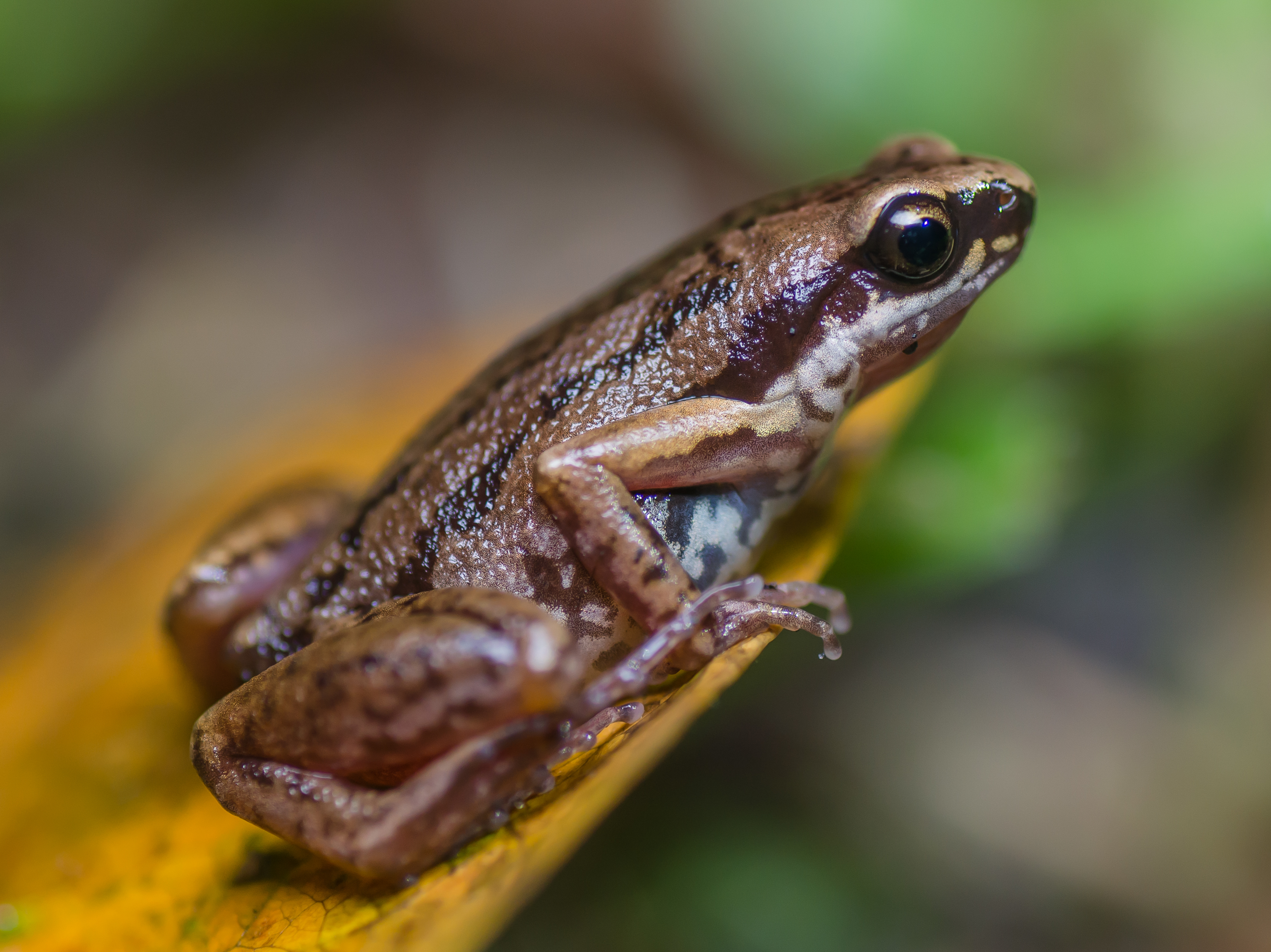

Conservation status
- Least Concern (IUCN 3.1)

Scientific classification
- Kingdom: Animalia
- Phylum: Chordata
- Class: Amphibia
- Order: Anura
- Family: Microhylidae
- Genus: Micryletta
- Species: M. inornata

Binomial name
- Micryletta inornata (Boulenger, 1890)

Synonyms
- Microhyla inornata

= Micryletta inornata =

Species of amphibian

Micryletta inornata is a rare species of frog in the family Microhylidae. It is endemic to the island of Sumatra in Indonesia, and is the type species for the genus Micryletta.

Many populations of Micryletta found across southeast Asia and the Andaman Islands were formerly classified under this species, but a 2019 study found most of these to represent either undescribed taxa of Micryletta or to fall under already-described related species such as M. erythropoda. Due to this, the study restricted the designation of M. inornata to just the populations known from Sumatra. These Sumatran populations had not been seen for over 129 years since Boulenger's description of the species until several were rediscovered during surveys while the study was underway.
