= List of amphibians of Indonesia =

This is a list of native amphibians in Indonesia.

== Order: Anura ==
- Family: Bombinatoridae Gray, 1825
  - Genus: Barbourula Taylor and Noble, 1924
    - Barbourula kalimantanensis Iskandar, 1978
- Family: Bufonidae Gray, 1825
  - Genus: Ansonia Stoliczka, 1870
    - Ansonia albomaculata Inger, 1960
    - Ansonia glandulosa Iskandar and Mumpuni, 2004
    - Ansonia hanitschi Inger, 1960
    - Ansonia latidisca Inger, 1966
    - Ansonia leptopus (Günther, 1872)
    - Ansonia longidigita Inger, 1960
    - Ansonia minuta Inger, 1960
    - Ansonia spinulifer (Mocquard, 1890)
  - Genus: Duttaphrynus Frost, Grant, Faivovich, Bain, Haas, Haddad, de Sá, Channing, Wilkinson, Donnellan, Raxworthy, Campbell, Blotto, Moler, Drewes, Nussbaum, Lynch, Green, and Wheeler, 2006
    - Duttaphrynus melanostictus (Schneider, 1799)
    - Duttaphrynus sumatranus (Peters, 1871)
    - Duttaphrynus totol (Ohler, 2010)
    - Duttaphrynus valhallae (Meade-Waldo, 1909)
  - Genus: Ingerophrynus Frost, Grant, Faivovich, Bain, Haas, Haddad, de Sá, Channing, Wilkinson, Donnellan, Raxworthy, Campbell, Blotto, Moler, Drewes, Nussbaum, Lynch, Green, and Wheeler, 2006
    - Ingerophrynus biporcatus (Gravenhorst, 1829)
    - Ingerophrynus celebensis (Günther, 1859)
    - Ingerophrynus claviger (Peters, 1863)
    - Ingerophrynus divergens (Peters, 1871)
    - Ingerophrynus parvus (Boulenger, 1887)
    - Ingerophrynus quadriporcatus (Boulenger, 1887)
  - Genus: Leptophryne Fitzinger, 1843
    - Leptophryne borbonica (Tschudi, 1838)
    - Leptophryne cruentata (Tschudi, 1838)
  - Genus: Pelophryne Barbour, 1938
    - Pelophryne guentheri (Boulenger, 1882)
    - Pelophryne rhopophilia Inger and Stuebing, 1996
    - Pelophryne signata (Boulenger, 1895)
  - Genus: Phrynoidis Fitzinger in Treitschke, 1842
    - Phrynoidis asper (Gravenhorst, 1829)
    - Phrynoidis juxtasper (Inger, 1964)
  - Genus: Pseudobufo Tschudi, 1838
    - Pseudobufo subasper Tschudi, 1838
  - Genus: Rentapia Chan, Grismer, Zachariah, Brown, and Abraham, 2016
    - Rentapia hosii (Boulenger, 1892)
  - Genus: Rhinella Fitzinger, 1826
    - Rhinella marina (Linnaeus, 1758)
  - Genus: Sabahphrynus Matsui, Yambun, and Sudin, 2007
    - Sabahphrynus maculatus (Mocquard, 1890)
  - Genus: Sigalegalephrynus
    - Sigalegalephrynus mandailinguensis Smart, Sarker, Arifin, Harvey, Sidik, Hamidy, Kurniawan, and Smith, 2017
    - Sigalegalephrynus minangkabauensis Smart, Sarker, Arifin, Harvey, Sidik, Hamidy, Kurniawan, and Smith, 2017
    - Sigalegalephrynus burnitelonensis Sarker, Wostl, Thammachoti, Sidik, Hamidy, Kurniawan, and Smith, 2019
    - Sigalegalephrynus gayoluesensis Sarker, Wostl, Thammachoti, Sidik, Hamidy, Kurniawan, and Smith, 2019
    - Sigalegalephrynus harveyi Sarker, Wostl, Thammachoti, Sidik, Hamidy, Kurniawan, and Smith, 2019
- Family: Ceratobatrachidae Boulenger, 1884
- Subfamily: Alcalinae Brown, Siler, Richards, Diesmos, and Cannatella, 2015
  - Genus: Alcalus Brown, Siler, Richards, Diesmos, and Cannatella, 2015
    - Alcalus baluensis (Boulenger, 1896)
    - Alcalus rajae (Iskandar, Bickford, and Arifin, 2011)
- Subfamily: Ceratobatrachinae Boulenger, 1884
  - Genus: Cornufer Tschudi, 1838
    - Cornufer batantae (Zweifel, 1969)
    - Cornufer bimaculatus (Günther, 1999)
    - Cornufer cheesmanae (Parker, 1940)
    - Cornufer cryptotis (Günther, 1999)
    - Cornufer paepkei (Günther, 2015)
    - Cornufer papuensis (Meyer, 1875)
    - Cornufer punctatus (Peters and Doria, 1878)
    - Cornufer wuenscheorum (Günther, 2006)
- Family: Dicroglossidae Anderson, 1871
- Subfamily: Dicroglossinae Anderson, 1871
  - Genus: Fejervarya Bolkay, 1915
    - Fejervarya cancrivora (Gravenhorst, 1829)
    - Fejervarya iskandari Veith, Kosuch, Ohler, and Dubois, 2001
    - Fejervarya limnocharis (Gravenhorst, 1829)
    - Fejervarya schlueteri (Werner, 1893)
    - Fejervarya verruculosa (Roux, 1911)
  - Genus: Limnonectes Fitzinger, 1843
    - Limnonectes arathooni (Smith, 1927)
    - Limnonectes asperatus (Inger, Boeadi, and Taufik, 1996)
    - Limnonectes blythii (Boulenger, 1920)
    - Limnonectes dammermani (Mertens, 1929)
    - Limnonectes finchi (Inger, 1966)
    - Limnonectes grunniens (Latreille, 1801)
    - Limnonectes heinrichi (Ahl, 1933)
    - Limnonectes hikidai Matsui and Nishikawa, 2014
    - Limnonectes ibanorum (Inger, 1964)
    - Limnonectes ingeri (Kiew, 1978)
    - Limnonectes kadarsani Iskandar, Boeadi, and Sancoyo, 1996
    - Limnonectes kenepaiensis (Inger, 1966)
    - Limnonectes khasianus (Anderson, 1871)
    - Limnonectes kong Dehling and Dehling, 2017
    - Limnonectes kuhlii (Tschudi, 1838)
    - Limnonectes larvaepartus Iskandar, Evans, and McGuire, 2014
    - Limnonectes leporinus Andersson, 1923
    - Limnonectes macrodon (Duméril and Bibron, 1841)
    - Limnonectes macrognathus (Boulenger, 1917)
    - Limnonectes malesianus (Kiew, 1984)
    - Limnonectes microdiscus (Boettger, 1892)
    - Limnonectes microtympanum (Van Kampen, 1907)
    - Limnonectes modestus (Boulenger, 1882)
    - Limnonectes palavanensis (Boulenger, 1894)
    - Limnonectes paramacrodon (Inger, 1966)
    - Limnonectes rhacodus (Inger, Boeadi, and Taufik, 1996)
    - Limnonectes shompenorum Das, 1996
    - Limnonectes sinuatodorsalis Matsui, 2015
    - Limnonectes sisikdagu McLeod, Horner, Husted, Barley, and Iskandar, 2011
    - Limnonectes timorensis (Smith, 1927)
    - Limnonectes tweediei (Smith, 1935)
- Subfamily: Occidozyginae Fei, Ye, and Huang, 1990
  - Genus: Occidozyga Kuhl and Van Hasselt, 1822
    - Occidozyga baluensis (Boulenger, 1896)
    - Occidozyga celebensis Smith, 1927
    - Occidozyga floresiana Mertens, 1927
    - Occidozyga lima (Gravenhorst, 1829)
    - Occidozyga semipalmata Smith, 1927
    - Occidozyga sumatrana (Peters, 1877)
    - Occidozyga tompotika Iskandar, Arifin, and Rachmanasah, 2011
- Family: Hylidae Rafinesque, 1815
- Family: Megophryidae Bonaparte, 1850
  - Genus: Leptobrachella Smith, 1925
    - Leptobrachella baluensis Smith, 1931
    - Leptobrachella dringi (Dubois, 1987)
    - Leptobrachella gracilis (Günther, 1872)
    - Leptobrachella hamidi (Matsui, 1997)
    - Leptobrachella juliandringi Eto, Matsui, and Nishikawa, 2015
    - Leptobrachella mjobergi Smith, 1925
    - Leptobrachella natunae (Günther, 1895)
    - Leptobrachella picta (Malkmus, 1992)
    - Leptobrachella serasanae Dring, 1983
  - Genus: Leptobrachium Tschudi, 1838
    - Leptobrachium abbotti (Cochran, 1926)
    - Leptobrachium hasseltii Tschudi, 1838
    - Leptobrachium hendricksoni Taylor, 1962
    - Leptobrachium ingeri Hamidy, Matsui, Nishikawa, and Belabut, 2012
    - Leptobrachium montanum Fischer, 1885
    - Leptobrachium waysepuntiense Hamidy and Matsui, 2010
  - Genus: Megophrys Kuhl and Van Hasselt, 1822
    - Megophrys baluensis (Boulenger, 1899)
    - Megophrys edwardinae Inger, 1989
    - Megophrys montana (Kuhl and Van Hasselt, 1822)
    - Megophrys nasuta (Schlegel, 1858)
    - Megophrys parallela Inger and Iskandar, 2005
- Family: Microhylidae Günther, 1858 (1843)
- Subfamily: Asterophryinae Günther, 1858
  - Genus: Aphantophryne
    - Aphantophryne parkeri (Loveridge, 1955)
  - Genus: Asterophrys Tschudi, 1838
    - Asterophrys eurydactyla (Zweifel, 1972)
    - Asterophrys foja (Günther, Richards, and Tjaturadi, 2016)
    - Asterophrys leucopus Richards, Johnston, and Burton, 1994
    - Asterophrys marani (Günther, 2009)
    - Asterophrys pullifer (Günther, 2006)
    - Asterophrys slateri Loveridge, 1955
    - Asterophrys turpicola (Schlegel, 1837)
  - Genus: Austrochaperina Fry, 1912
    - Austrochaperina basipalmata (Van Kampen, 1906)
    - Austrochaperina blumi Zweifel, 2000
    - Austrochaperina kosarek Zweifel, 2000
    - Austrochaperina macrorhyncha (Van Kampen, 1906)
    - Austrochaperina minutissima Günther, 2009
    - Austrochaperina punctata (Van Kampen, 1913)
    - Austrochaperina rudolfarndti Günther, 2017
  - Genus: Barygenys Parker, 1936
  - Genus: Callulops Boulenger, 1888
    - Callulops biakensis Günther, Stelbrink, and von Rintelen, 2012
    - Callulops boettgeri (Méhely, 1901)
    - Callulops dubius (Boettger, 1895)
    - Callulops fojaensis Oliver, Richards, and Tjaturadi, 2012
    - Callulops fuscus (Peters, 1867)
    - Callulops kampeni (Boulenger, 1914)
    - Callulops kopsteini (Mertens, 1930)
    - Callulops valvifer (Barbour, 1910)
    - Callulops wondiwoiensis Günther, Stelbrink, and von Rintelen, 2012
    - Callulops yapenensis Günther, Stelbrink, and von Rintelen, 2012
  - Genus: Choerophryne Van Kampen, 1914
    - Choerophryne amomani Günther, 2008
    - Choerophryne arndtorum Günther, 2008
    - Choerophryne laurini (Günther, 2000)
    - Choerophryne microps Günther, 2008
    - Choerophryne nigrescens Günther, 2008
    - Choerophryne proboscidea Van Kampen, 1914
    - Choerophryne rostellifer (Wandolleck, 1911)
    - Choerophryne tubercula (Richards, Johnston, and Burton, 1992)
    - Choerophryne variegata (Van Kampen, 1923)
  - Genus: Cophixalus Boettger, 1892
    - Cophixalus balbus Günther, 2003
    - Cophixalus biroi (Méhely, 1901)
    - Cophixalus cheesmanae Parker, 1934
    - Cophixalus humicola Günther, 2006
    - Cophixalus monosyllabus Günther, 2010
    - Cophixalus montanus (Boettger, 1895)
    - Cophixalus pictus Kraus, 2012
    - Cophixalus rajampatensis Günther, Richards, Tjaturadi, and Krey, 2015
    - Cophixalus salawatiensis Günther, Richards, Tjaturadi, and Krey, 2015
    - Cophixalus tetzlaffi Günther, 2003
    - Cophixalus tridactylus Günther, 2006
  - Genus: Copiula Méhely, 1901
    - Copiula derongo (Zweifel, 2000)
    - Copiula exspectata Günther, 2002
    - Copiula major Günther, 2002
    - Copiula obsti Günther, 2002
    - Copiula pipiens Burton and Stocks, 1986
  - Genus: Gastrophrynoides Noble, 1926
    - Gastrophrynoides borneensis (Boulenger, 1897)
  - Genus: Hylophorbus Macleay, 1878
    - Hylophorbus nigrinus Günther, 2001
    - Hylophorbus picoides Günther, 2001
    - Hylophorbus rufescens Macleay, 1878
    - Hylophorbus sextus Günther, 2001
    - Hylophorbus tetraphonus Günther, 2001
    - Hylophorbus wondiwoi Günther, 2001
  - Genus: Mantophryne Boulenger, 1897
    - Mantophryne lateralis Boulenger, 1897
  - Genus: Oninia Günther, Stelbrink, and von Rintelen, 2010
    - Oninia senglaubi Günther, Stelbrink, and von Rintelen, 2010
  - Genus: Oreophryne Boettger, 1895
    - Oreophryne albopunctata (Van Kampen, 1909)
    - Oreophryne alticola Zweifel, Cogger, and Richards, 2005
    - Oreophryne asplenicola Günther, 2003
    - Oreophryne atrigularis Günther, Richards, and Iskandar, 2001
    - Oreophryne biroi (Méhely, 1897)
    - Oreophryne brevicrus Zweifel, 1956
    - Oreophryne brevirostris Zweifel, Cogger, and Richards, 2005
    - Oreophryne celebensis (Müller, 1894)
    - Oreophryne choerophrynoides Günther, 2015
    - Oreophryne clamata Günther, 2003
    - Oreophryne crucifer (Van Kampen, 1913)
    - Oreophryne flava Parker, 1934
    - Oreophryne frontifasciata (Horst, 1883)
    - Oreophryne furu Günther, Richards, Tjaturadi, and Iskandar, 2009
    - Oreophryne habbemensis Zweifel, Cogger, and Richards, 2005
    - Oreophryne idenburgensis Zweifel, 1956
    - Oreophryne jeffersoniana Dunn, 1928
    - Oreophryne kapisa Günther, 2003
    - Oreophryne mertoni (Roux, 1910)
    - Oreophryne minuta Richards and Iskandar, 2000
    - Oreophryne moluccensis (Peters and Doria, 1878)
    - Oreophryne monticola (Boulenger, 1897)
    - Oreophryne oviprotector Günther, Richards, Bickford, and Johnston, 2012
    - Oreophryne pseudasplenicola Günther, 2003
    - Oreophryne roedeli Günther, 2015
    - Oreophryne rookmaakeri Mertens, 1927
    - Oreophryne sibilans Günther, 2003
    - Oreophryne terrestris Zweifel, Cogger, and Richards, 2005
    - Oreophryne unicolor Günther, 2003
    - Oreophryne variabilis (Boulenger, 1896)
    - Oreophryne waira Günther, 2003
    - Oreophryne wapoga Günther, Richards, and Iskandar, 2001
    - Oreophryne wolterstorffi (Werner, 1901)
    - Oreophryne zimmeri Ahl, 1933
  - Genus: Sphenophryne Peters and Doria, 1878
    - Sphenophryne brevicrus (Van Kampen, 1913)
    - Sphenophryne cornuta Peters and Doria, 1878
    - Sphenophryne schlaginhaufeni Wandolleck, 1911
  - Genus: Xenorhina Peters, 1863
    - Xenorhina adisca Kraus and Allison, 2003
    - Xenorhina anorbis (Blum and Menzies, 1989)
    - Xenorhina arfakiana (Blum and Menzies, 1989)
    - Xenorhina arndti Günther, 2010
    - Xenorhina bidens Van Kampen, 1909
    - Xenorhina bouwensi (De Witte, 1930)
    - Xenorhina eiponis Blum and Menzies, 1989
    - Xenorhina fuscigula (Blum and Menzies, 1989)
    - Xenorhina gigantea Van Kampen, 1915
    - Xenorhina lanthanites (Günther and Knop, 2006)
    - Xenorhina macrodisca Günther and Richards, 2005
    - Xenorhina macrops Van Kampen, 1913
    - Xenorhina mehelyi (Boulenger, 1898)
    - Xenorhina minima (Parker, 1934)
    - Xenorhina multisica (Blum and Menzies, 1989)
    - Xenorhina obesa (Zweifel, 1960)
    - Xenorhina ocellata Van Kampen, 1913
    - Xenorhina ophiodon (Peters and Doria, 1878)
    - Xenorhina oxycephala (Schlegel, 1858)
    - Xenorhina parkerorum Zweifel, 1972
    - Xenorhina rostrata (Méhely, 1898)
    - Xenorhina scheepstrai (Blum and Menzies, 1989)
    - Xenorhina schiefenhoeveli (Blum and Menzies, 1989)
    - Xenorhina similis (Zweifel, 1956)
    - Xenorhina varia Günther and Richards, 2005
- Subfamily: Chaperininae Peloso, Frost, Richards, Rodrigues, Donnellan, Matsui, Raxworthy, Biju, Lemmon, Lemmon, and Wheeler, 2016
  - Genus: Chaperina Mocquard, 1892
    - Chaperina fusca Mocquard, 1892
- Subfamily: Kalophryninae Mivart, 1869
  - Genus: Kalophrynus Tschudi, 1838
    - Kalophrynus bunguranus (Günther, 1895)
    - Kalophrynus eok Das and Haas, 2003
    - Kalophrynus heterochirus Boulenger, 1900
    - Kalophrynus intermedius Inger, 1966
    - Kalophrynus meizon Zug, 2015
    - Kalophrynus minusculus Iskandar, 1998
    - Kalophrynus pleurostigma Tschudi, 1838
    - Kalophrynus punctatus Peters, 1871
    - Kalophrynus subterrestris Inger, 1966
- Subfamily: Microhylinae Günther, 1858 (1843)
  - Genus: Glyphoglossus Gunther, 1869 "1868"
    - Glyphoglossus brooksii (Boulenger, 1904)
    - Glyphoglossus capsus (Das, Min, Hsu, Hertwig, and Haas, 2014)
    - Glyphoglossus volzi (Van Kampen, 1905)
  - Genus: Kaloula Gray, 1831
    - Kaloula baleata (Müller, 1836)
    - Kaloula pulchra Gray, 1831
  - Genus: Metaphrynella Parker, 1934
    - Metaphrynella sundana (Peters, 1867)
  - Genus: Microhyla Tschudi, 1838
    - Microhyla achatina Tschudi, 1838
    - Microhyla berdmorei (Blyth, 1856)
    - Microhyla borneensis Parker, 1928
    - Microhyla heymonsi Vogt, 1911
    - Microhyla malang Matsui, 2011
    - Microhyla orientalis Matsui, Hamidy, and Eto, 2013
    - Microhyla palmipes Boulenger, 1897
    - Microhyla perparva Inger and Frogner, 1979
    - Microhyla petrigena Inger and Frogner, 1979
    - Microhyla superciliaris Parker, 1928
  - Genus: Micryletta Dubois, 1987
    - Micryletta inornata (Boulenger, 1890)
  - Genus: Phrynella Boulenger, 1887
    - Phrynella pulchra Boulenger, 1887

Superfamily: Myobatrachoidea

- Family: Limnodynastidae Lynch, 1969
  - Genus: Lechriodus Boulenger, 1882
    - Lechriodus aganoposis Zweifel, 1972
    - Lechriodus melanopyga (Doria, 1875)
    - Lechriodus platyceps Parker, 1940
  - Genus: Limnodynastes Fitzinger, 1843
    - Limnodynastes convexiusculus (Macleay, 1878)
- Family: Myobatrachidae Schlegel, 1850
  - Genus: Crinia Tschudi, 1838
    - Crinia remota (Tyler and Parker, 1974)
  - Genus: Uperoleia Gray, 1841
    - Uperoleia lithomoda Tyler, Davies, and Martin, 1981
    - Uperoleia mimula Davies, McDonald, and Corben, 1986
- Subfamily: Litoriinae Dubois and Frétey, 2016
    - Genus: Litoria Tschudi, 1838
    - Litoria amboinensis (Horst, 1883)
    - Litoria angiana (Boulenger, 1915)
    - Litoria arfakiana (Peters and Doria, 1878)
    - Litoria biakensis Günther, 2006
    - Litoria capitula (Tyler, 1968)
    - Litoria chloronota (Boulenger, 1911)
    - Litoria christianbergmanni Günther, 2008
    - Litoria congenita (Peters and Doria, 1878)
    - Litoria darlingtoni (Loveridge, 1945)
    - Litoria dorsalis Macleay, 1878
    - Litoria eurynastes Menzies, Richards, and Tyler, 2008
    - Litoria everetti (Boulenger, 1897)
    - Litoria gasconi Richards, Oliver, Krey, and Tjaturadi, 2009
    - Litoria havina Menzies, 1993
    - Litoria humboldtorum Günther, 2006
    - Litoria iris (Tyler, 1962)
    - Litoria lodesdema Menzies, Richards, and Tyler, 2008
    - Litoria longicrus (Boulenger, 1911)
    - Litoria mareku Günther, 2008
    - Litoria megalops Richards and Iskandar, 2006
    - Litoria micromembrana (Tyler, 1963)
    - Litoria modica (Tyler, 1968)
    - Litoria mucro Menzies, 1993
    - Litoria mystax (Van Kampen, 1906)
    - Litoria nasuta (Gray, 1842)
    - Litoria nigrofrenata (Günther, 1867)
    - Litoria nigropunctata (Meyer, 1875)
    - Litoria pygmaea (Meyer, 1875)
    - Litoria quadrilineata Tyler and Parker, 1974
    - Litoria rothii (De Vis, 1884)
    - Litoria rubella (Gray, 1842)
    - Litoria scabra Günther and Richards, 2005
    - Litoria thesaurensis (Peters, 1877)
    - Litoria timida Tyler and Parker, 1972
    - Litoria umarensis Günther, 2004
    - Litoria umbonata Tyler and Davies, 1983
    - Litoria verae Günther, 2004
    - Litoria viranula Menzies, Richards, and Tyler, 2008
    - Litoria vocivincens Menzies, 1972
    - Litoria wapogaensis Richards and Iskandar, 2001
    - Litoria wisselensis (Tyler, 1968)
    - Litoria wollastoni (Boulenger, 1914)
- Subfamily: Pelodryadinae Günther, 1858
  - Genus: Nyctimystes Stejneger, 1916
    - Nyctimystes fluviatilis Zweifel, 1958
    - Nyctimystes granti (Boulenger, 1914)
    - Nyctimystes humeralis (Boulenger, 1912)
    - Nyctimystes infrafrenatus (Günther, 1867)
    - Nyctimystes montanus (Peters and Doria, 1878)
    - Nyctimystes narinosus Zweifel, 1958
    - Nyctimystes pulcher (Wandolleck, 1911)
    - Nyctimystes purpureolatus (Oliver, Richards, Tjaturadi, and Iskandar, 2007)
    - Nyctimystes sanguinolenta (Van Kampen, 1909)
  - Genus: Ranoidea Tschudi, 1838
    - "Ranoidea papua" (Van Kampen, 1909)
    - Ranoidea aruensis (Horst, 1883)
    - Ranoidea brongersmai (Loveridge, 1945)
    - Ranoidea caerulea (White, 1790)
    - Ranoidea dahlii (Boulenger, 1896)
    - Ranoidea dorsivena (Tyler, 1968)
    - Ranoidea elkeae (Günther and Richards, 2000)
    - Ranoidea eucnemis (Lönnberg, 1900)
    - Ranoidea fuscula (Oliver and Richards, 2007)
    - Ranoidea genimaculata (Horst, 1883)
    - Ranoidea graminea (Boulenger, 1905)
    - Ranoidea macki (Richards, 2001)
    - Ranoidea napaea (Tyler, 1968)
    - Ranoidea pratti (Boulenger, 1911)
    - Ranoidea rara (Günther and Richards, 2005)
    - Ranoidea rivicola (Günther and Richards, 2005)
    - Ranoidea rueppelli (Boettger, 1895)
- Family: Pipidae Gray, 1825
  - Genus: Xenopus Wagler, 1827
    - Xenopus laevis (Daudin, 1802)
- Family: Ranidae Batsch, 1796
    - "Hylarana" celebensis (Peters, 1872)
    - "Hylarana" persimilis (Van Kampen, 1923)
  - Genus: Abavorana Oliver, Prendini, Kraus, and Raxworthy, 2015
    - Abavorana luctuosa (Peters, 1871)
  - Genus: Amnirana Dubois, 1992
    - Amnirana nicobariensis (Stoliczka, 1870)
  - Genus: Chalcorana Dubois, 1992
    - Chalcorana chalconota (Schlegel, 1837)
    - Chalcorana macrops (Boulenger, 1897)
    - Chalcorana megalonesa (Inger, Stuart, and Iskandar, 2009)
    - Chalcorana mocquardi (Werner, 1901)
    - Chalcorana parvaccola (Inger, Stuart, and Iskandar, 2009)
    - Chalcorana raniceps (Peters, 1871)
    - Chalcorana rufipes (Inger, Stuart, and Iskandar, 2009)
  - Genus: Huia Yang, 1991
    - Huia cavitympanum (Boulenger, 1893)
    - Huia masonii (Boulenger, 1884)
    - Huia modiglianii (Doria, Salvidio, and Tavano, 1999)
    - Huia sumatrana Yang, 1991
  - Genus: Hylarana Tschudi, 1838
    - Hylarana erythraea (Schlegel, 1837)
  - Genus: Lithobates Fitzinger, 1843
    - Lithobates catesbeianus (Shaw, 1802)
  - Genus: Meristogenys Yang, 1991
    - Meristogenys amoropalamus (Matsui, 1986)
    - Meristogenys kinabaluensis (Inger, 1966)
    - Meristogenys orphnocnemis (Matsui, 1986)
    - Meristogenys phaeomerus (Inger and Gritis, 1983)
    - Meristogenys poecilus (Inger and Gritis, 1983)
    - Meristogenys whiteheadi (Boulenger, 1887)
  - Genus: Odorrana Fei, Ye, and Huang, 1990
    - Odorrana hosii (Boulenger, 1891)
  - Genus: Papurana Dubois, 1992
    - Papurana arfaki (Meyer, 1875)
    - Papurana aurata (Günther, 2003)
    - Papurana daemeli (Steindachner, 1868)
    - Papurana elberti (Roux, 1911)
    - Papurana florensis (Boulenger, 1897)
    - Papurana garritor (Menzies, 1987)
    - Papurana grisea (Van Kampen, 1913)
    - Papurana jimiensis (Tyler, 1963)
    - Papurana moluccana (Boettger, 1895)
    - Papurana novaeguineae (Van Kampen, 1909)
    - Papurana papua (Lesson, 1829)
    - Papurana supragrisea (Menzies, 1987)
    - Papurana volkerjane (Günther, 2003)
  - Genus: Pulchrana Dubois, 1992
    - Pulchrana baramica (Boettger, 1900)
    - Pulchrana debussyi (Van Kampen, 1910)
    - Pulchrana glandulosa (Boulenger, 1882)
    - Pulchrana laterimaculata (Barbour and Noble, 1916)
    - Pulchrana picturata (Boulenger, 1920)
    - Pulchrana rawa (Matsui, Mumpuni, and Hamidy, 2012)
    - Pulchrana siberu (Dring, McCarthy, and Whitten, 1990)
    - Pulchrana signata (Günther, 1872)
  - Genus: Sanguirana Dubois, 1992
    - Sanguirana sanguinea (Boettger, 1893)
  - Genus: Staurois Cope, 1865
    - Staurois guttatus (Günther, 1858)
    - Staurois latopalmatus (Boulenger, 1887)
    - Staurois tuberilinguis Boulenger, 1918
  - Genus: Sumaterana Arifin, Smart, Hertwig, Smith, Iskandar, and Haas, 2018
    - Sumaterana crassiovis (Boulenger, 1920)
    - Sumaterana dabulescens Arifin, Smart, Hertwig, Smith, Iskandar, and Haas, 2018
    - Sumaterana montana Arifin, Smart, Hertwig, Smith, Iskandar, and Haas, 2018
- Family: Rhacophoridae Hoffman, 1932 (1858)
- Subfamily: Rhacophorinae Hoffman, 1932 (1858)
  - Genus: Chiromantis Peters, 1854
    - Chiromantis baladika Riyanto and Kurniati, 2014
    - Chiromantis nauli Riyanto and Kurniati, 2014
    - Chiromantis trilaksonoi Riyanto and Kurniati, 2014
    - Chiromantis vittiger (Boulenger, 1897)
  - Genus: Feihyla Frost, Grant, Faivovich, Bain, Haas, Haddad, de Sá, Channing, Wilkinson, Donnellan, Raxworthy, Campbell, Blotto, Moler, Drewes, Nussbaum, Lynch, Green, and Wheeler, 2006
    - Feihyla kajau (Dring, 1983)
  - Genus: Kurixalus Ye, Fei, and Dubois, 1999
    - Kurixalus appendiculatus (Günther, 1858)
  - Genus: Nyctixalus Boulenger, 1882
    - Nyctixalus margaritifer (Boulenger, 1882)
    - Nyctixalus pictus (Peters, 1871)
  - Genus: Philautus Gistel, 1848
    - Philautus amabilis Wostl, Riyanto, Hamidy, Kurniawan, Smith, and Harvey, 2017
    - Philautus aurifasciatus (Schlegel, 1837)
    - Philautus cornutus (Boulenger, 1920)
    - Philautus erythrophthalmus Stuebing and Wong, 2000
    - Philautus hosii (Boulenger, 1895)
    - Philautus ingeri Dring, 1987
    - Philautus jacobsoni (Van Kampen, 1912)
    - Philautus kerangae Dring, 1987
    - Philautus larutensis (Boulenger, 1900)
    - Philautus longicrus (Boulenger, 1894)
    - Philautus macroscelis (Boulenger, 1896)
    - Philautus mjobergi Smith, 1925
    - Philautus pallidipes (Barbour, 1908)
    - Philautus petersi (Boulenger, 1900)
    - Philautus polymorphus Wostl, Riyanto, Hamidy, Kurniawan, Smith, and Harvey, 2017
    - Philautus refugii Inger and Stuebing, 1996
    - Philautus tectus Dring, 1987
    - Philautus thamyridion Wostl, Riyanto, Hamidy, Kurniawan, Smith, and Harvey, 2017
    - Philautus ventrimaculatus Wostl, Riyanto, Hamidy, Kurniawan, Smith, and Harvey, 2017
  - Genus: Polypedates Tschudi, 1838
    - Polypedates colletti (Boulenger, 1890)
    - Polypedates iskandari Riyanto, Mumpuni, and McGuire, 2011
    - Polypedates leucomystax (Gravenhorst, 1829)
    - Polypedates macrotis (Boulenger, 1891)
    - Polypedates mutus (Smith, 1940)
    - Polypedates otilophus (Boulenger, 1893)
    - Polypedates pseudotilophus Matsui, Hamidy, and Kuraishi, 2014
  - Genus: Rhacophorus Kuhl and Van Hasselt, 1822
    - Rhacophorus achantharrhena Harvey, Pemberton, and Smith, 2002
    - Rhacophorus angulirostris Ahl, 1927
    - Rhacophorus barisani Harvey, Pemberton, and Smith, 2002
    - Rhacophorus bengkuluensis Streicher, Hamidy, Harvey, Anders, Shaney, Kurniawan, and Smith, 2014
    - Rhacophorus bifasciatus Van Kampen, 1923
    - Rhacophorus catamitus Harvey, Pemberton, and Smith, 2002
    - Rhacophorus cyanopunctatus Manthey and Steiof, 1998
    - Rhacophorus dulitensis Boulenger, 1892
    - Rhacophorus edentulus Müller, 1894
    - Rhacophorus fasciatus Boulenger, 1895
    - Rhacophorus gauni (Inger, 1966)
    - Rhacophorus georgii Roux, 1904
    - Rhacophorus harrissoni Inger and Haile, 1959
    - Rhacophorus indonesiensis Hamidy and Kurniati, 2015
    - Rhacophorus margaritifer (Schlegel, 1837)
    - Rhacophorus modestus Boulenger, 1920
    - Rhacophorus monticola Boulenger, 1896
    - Rhacophorus nigropalmatus Boulenger, 1895
    - Rhacophorus norhayatii Chan and Grismer, 2010
    - Rhacophorus pardalis Günther, 1858
    - Rhacophorus poecilonotus Boulenger, 1920
    - Rhacophorus pseudacutirostris Dehling, 2011
    - Rhacophorus reinwardtii (Schlegel, 1840)
    - Rhacophorus rufipes Inger, 1966
  - Genus: Theloderma Tschudi, 1838
    - Theloderma asperum (Boulenger, 1886)
    - Theloderma leporosum Tschudi, 1838

== Order: Gymnophiona ==
- Family: Ichthyophiidae Taylor, 1968
  - Genus: Ichthyophis Fitzinger, 1826
    - Ichthyophis bernisi Salvador, 1975
    - Ichthyophis billitonensis Taylor, 1965
    - Ichthyophis elongatus Taylor, 1965
    - Ichthyophis humphreyi Taylor, 1973
    - Ichthyophis hypocyaneus (Boie, 1827)
    - Ichthyophis javanicus Taylor, 1960
    - Ichthyophis monochrous (Bleeker, 1858)
    - Ichthyophis nigroflavus Taylor, 1960
    - Ichthyophis paucidentulus Taylor, 1960
    - Ichthyophis paucisulcus Taylor, 1960
    - Ichthyophis sumatranus Taylor, 1960
