= Oreophryne hypsiops =

Conservation status
- Least Concern (IUCN 3.1)

Scientific classification
- Kingdom: Animalia
- Phylum: Chordata
- Class: Amphibia
- Order: Anura
- Family: Microhylidae
- Genus: Oreophryne
- Species: O. hypsiops

Binomial name
- Oreophryne hypsiops Zweifel, Menzies, and Price, 2003

Species of frog

Oreophryne hypsiops is a species of frog in the family Microhylidae. It is endemic to northern Papua New Guinea and is known the Adelbert Range westward, including the adjacent coastal areas, to the Schrader Range and further to Lumi in the West Sepik Province. Prior to its description, it was mixed with Oreophryne biroi.

== Description ==
Adult males measure 22–23 mm (0.87–0.91 in) and adult females 25–26 mm (0.98–1.02 in) in snout–vent length. The canthus rostralis is rounded and not distinct. The tympanum is barely visible. The fingers and the toes have well-developed terminal disks. The fingers have no webbing whereas the toes have sparse webbing. The dorsum is dark gray to gray-brown; there is a more or less distinct dark, W-like mark in the scapular region. A rusty hourglass-shaped marking, an inter-ocular bar, and a dark mark in the postocular-supratympanic region may be present. Black lumbar ocelli with white anterior edging are usually present. The groin and the thighs are yellow, sometimes with light gray mottling. The chin, chest, and abdomen are gray, sometimes almost black, with the chin darker than posteriorly, with tiny white flecks. The iris is grayish gold to dark gray-brown.

The male advertisement call is a series of 20–28 notes, with a dominant frequency of 2900–3200 Hz. The notes are uttered at a rate of 7–10 s^{−1}, and the call lasts a few seconds.

== Habitat and conservation ==
Oreophryne hypsiops occurs in tropical rainforests at elevations up to about 975 m (3,199 ft) above sea level. Calling males are perched in vegetation as high as five meters above the ground. Development is probably direct, without free-living tadpole stage.

Threats to this species are unknown. It is not known to occur in any protected areas.
