= Bruno Geisler =

German ornithologist

Bruno Geisler (5 October 1857, Mittelwalde, Kr. Glatz, Silesia – 7 October 1945 Dresden) was a German ornithologist, specimen collector, and bird illustrator.

== Career ==
Bruno and his brother Hubert worked for the naturalia firm Wilhelm Schlüter in Halle. In 1887, Bruno Geisler began collecting birds in Ceylon and Java with his brother Hubert. In 1890, they moved on to the then German colony New Guinea. Their bird specimens and some ethnographic material were mainly sold to the then zoological-ethnological-anthropological museum in Dresden (now Staatliches Museum für Tierkunde Dresden and Museum of Ethnology Dresden) and to the dealer Wilhelm Schlüter in Halle, Saxony-Anhalt. In 1893, Bruno Geisler became a curator and taxidermist in the Dresden museum as an assistant to Adolf Bernard Meyer, then a professor at the Dresden museum.

The bird skins collected by Bruno and Herbert were studied by Adolf Bernard Meyer. Bruno was also a bird illustrator. He became also well known for the bird plates in The birds of Celebes and the neighbouring islands by Adolf Meyer and Lionel William Wiglesworth published in Berlin by R. Friedländer in 1898, Anton Reichenow’s Die Vögel Afrikas Vols 1-3 published by J. Neuman in Neudamm between 1897 and 1905 and in the new Naumann's, Naturgeschichte der Vögel Mitteleuropas published in 1900–1905.

== Recognition ==
The frog Oreophryne geislerorum, the birds Ailuroedus geislerorum and Ptilorrhoa geislerorum were named for the brothers. Dendropsophus giesleri, Drepanornis albertisi geisleri was named for him.

== Other sources ==
- Gebhart L., 1964 Die Ornithologen Mitteleuropas. Giessen, p. 108.
- Heyder, R., 1965 Der Vogelmaler Bruno Geisler. Abh. Dresden 28: 143–155. (Photo). Lists all illustrations.
- Jackson, C.E., 1999 Dictionary of Bird Artists of the World. 252 f.
- Jakobi A., 1925 50 Jahre Museum für Völkerkunde Dresden.
- Wichmann A., 1912 Nova Guinea 2. — Teil 2, Leiden. 517–518, 557-558
