= Oreophryne phoebe =

Conservation status
- Vulnerable (IUCN 3.1)

Scientific classification
- Kingdom: Animalia
- Phylum: Chordata
- Class: Amphibia
- Order: Anura
- Family: Microhylidae
- Genus: Oreophryne
- Species: O. phoebe

Binomial name
- Oreophryne phoebe Kraus, 2017
- Oreophryne phoebe is only known from the Woodlark Island, Papua New Guinea

Synonyms
- Asterophrys phoebe — Dubois et al., 2021

Species of frogs

Oreophryne phoebe is a species of frog in the family Microhylidae. It is endemic to Woodlark Island, Papua New Guinea.

== Description ==
Adult males measure 19–23 mm (0.7–0.9 in) and adult females 21–28 mm (0.8–1.1 in) in snout–vent length. The snout is truncate in the side view and shallowly angulate when viewed from above. The tympanum is small with an indistinct annulus. The supratympanic fold is weak. The toes are partially webbed whereas the fingers are unwebbed. Finger tips bear discs with terminal grooves. The toe discs are smaller. Dorsal coloration is peach tan or orange tan with cherry-red flash markings on legs and groin, and sometimes in the axilla. Some animals are darker brown with orange cast. Juveniles are much darker brown still. The venter is pale peach with many brown dots. The iris is gray-blue in adults and dark green gray in juveniles.

The male advertisement call is a "whinny" consisting of a rapidly delivered series of 37–45 notes that lasts for about 2.2–2.7 seconds in total. The dominant frequency is 2.9 kHz (range 2.7–3.1 kHz).

== Habitat and conservation ==
Oreophryne phoebe inhabits lowland primary and disturbed rainforest. It has been recorded at elevations between 38 and 89 m (125 and 292 ft) above sea level, but likely occurs throughout the elevations available on the island, to 240 m (790 ft). It is nocturnal, with males calling from 1–2.5 m (3–8 ft) above ground on trees and shrubs. During the daytime, both adult and juvenile O. phoebe may hide in water-filled axils of Pandanus and other plants. Development is direct (i.e., there is no free-living larval stage).

Oreophryne phoebe is a common species. In 2020 it was concluded that the level of logging prevailing then was not threatening this species but that the situation could change with potential future oil palm and open pit mining projects.
