= Rossell Island tree frog =

Conservation status
- Least Concern (IUCN 3.1)

Scientific classification
- Kingdom: Animalia
- Phylum: Chordata
- Class: Amphibia
- Order: Anura
- Family: Pelodryadidae
- Genus: Papuahyla
- Species: P. louisiadensis

Binomial name
- Papuahyla louisiadensis (Tyler, 1968)

Synonyms
- Litoria louisiadensis (Tyler, 1968)

Species of amphibian

The Rossell Island tree frog (Papuahyla louisiadensis) is a species of frog in the family Pelodryadidae found along streams in lowland forests on Rossel Island and Tagula Island in Papua New Guinea. It has been observed between 127 and 700 meters above sea level.
