= Oreophryne notata =

Conservation status
- Least Concern (IUCN 3.1)

Scientific classification
- Kingdom: Animalia
- Phylum: Chordata
- Class: Amphibia
- Order: Anura
- Family: Microhylidae
- Genus: Oreophryne
- Species: O. notata

Binomial name
- Oreophryne notata Zweifel, 2003

Species of amphibian

Oreophryne notata is a species of frog in the family Microhylidae. It is endemic to Papua New Guinea and known from two localities, Ialibu, its type locality in the Southern Highlands Province, and Tabubil in the Western Province. It might occur more widely. The specific name notata is from Latin nota meaning a "mark" or "letter" and refers to the diagnostic U-like pattern on the lores.

== Description ==
Males grow to 19 mm (0.7 in) and females to 21 mm (0.8 in) in snout–vent length. The snout is almost truncate in dorsal view but vertical, slightly rounded in profile. The tympanum is small and indistinct, but the eyes are comparatively large. The fingers and toes have no webbing but bear well-developed terminal disks. The dorsum has gray-brown or tan ground color and shows only faint markings. The facial region is slightly darker than the dorsal ground color and has a characteristic, inverted U-shaped white mark just anterior to the eye. The hind legs have a reddish tint. The ventral surfaces are pale translucent gray with lighter flecks.

The male advertisement call is a series of peeping notes with dominant frequency of 3500–3600 Hz. Development is presumably direct, without free-living tadpole stage, as in other members of this genus.

== Habitat and conservation ==
Oreophryne notata is known from tropical rainforests at elevations of 550–1,920 m (1,800–6,300 ft) above sea level. They occur on vegetation above the ground, in shrubs and trees such as Pandanus. Males call at night. The threats to this little known species are not known. It is not known to occur in any protected area.
