= Ischnohyla =

Scientific classification
- Kingdom: Animalia
- Phylum: Chordata
- Class: Amphibia
- Order: Anura
- Family: Pelodryadidae
- Genus: Ischnohyla; Richards, Mahony, and Donnellan, 2025

Species
- Ischnohyla daraiensis (Richards, Donnellan & Oliver, 2023); Ischnohyla gracilis (Richards, Donnellan & Oliver, 2023); Ischnohyla nigropunctata (Meyer, 1875); Ischnohyla umarensis (Günther, 2004); Ischnohyla vocivincens (Menzies, 1972)

Genus of amphibians

Ischnohyla is a genus of tree frogs in the family Pelodryadidae, native to New Guinea. Species in the genus were previously included within the wastebasket genus Litoria, but were separated into a new genus in 2025. They are small frogs with highly camouflaged skin, usually mottled greens, browns or cream.

The genus is named from the Greek ischnos meaning "weak or thin" alluding to their slender body, and the tree frog genus name Hyla.
