= Oreophryne wapoga =

Conservation status
- Data Deficient (IUCN 3.1)

Scientific classification
- Kingdom: Animalia
- Phylum: Chordata
- Class: Amphibia
- Order: Anura
- Family: Microhylidae
- Genus: Oreophryne
- Species: O. wapoga

Binomial name
- Oreophryne wapoga Günther, Richards, and Iskandar, 2001

Species of frog

Oreophryne wapoga is a species of frog in the family Microhylidae. It is endemic to Western New Guinea (Indonesia) and is known from its type locality, the headwaters of the Wapoga River, and from the island of Papua (province), both in the Papua province. The Yapen population might represent a separate species.

== Description ==
Adult males in the type series from Wapoga measure 22–23 mm (0.9–0.9 in) in snout–urostyle length (SUL); no females were collected. Males from Yapen are on average slightly smaller than from Wapoga, respectively 20.9 and 22.6 mm (0.8 and 0.9 in) SUL. A female from Yapen measures 22.5 mm (0.9 in) SUL.

Oreophryne wapoga is morphologically similar to Oreophryne atrigularis, but the head is relatively shorter and the eyes bigger. The throat is dark brown, and the pigmentation of the body is more spotted. The ground colour is beige, grey, or brown dorsally and cream ventrally. One of the five Wapoga types has a relatively broad mid-dorsal line.

== Reproduction ==
Males call from the ground or from vegetation up to 2.5 m (8 ft) above the ground. The male advertisement call is a long series of notes, lasting from about 10 seconds to half a minute. The initial notes of a call series have relatively long inter-note intervals and are followed by "fast" notes, with much higher repetition rates. Individual notes last about 0.05–0.1 seconds. The calls of Yapen males consist of single creaks, small groups of creaks with comparatively long and often irregular inter-note intervals, and longer series of creaks. Males guard the eggs. Development is direct, without free-living tadpole stage. On Yapen, a male was observed carrying eight juveniles on his back.

== Habitat and conservation ==
Oreophryne wapoga is known from lower-montane tropical rainforests at elevations of 500–1,070 m (1,640–3,510 ft) above sea level. The live in or under leaf litter, but males can climb to vegetation to call at night.

Oreophryne wapoga occurs at low densities, but it is not believed to face significant threats. The Yapen population probably occurs within the Yapen Nature Reserve.
