= Viridihyla =

Scientific classification
- Kingdom: Animalia
- Phylum: Chordata
- Class: Amphibia
- Order: Anura
- Family: Pelodryadidae
- Genus: Viridihyla; Richards, Mahony, and Donnellan, 2025

Species
- See text

Genus of amphibians

Viridihyla is a genus of tree frogs in the family Pelodryadidae, native to New Guinea.

Species of this genus typically inhabit nearby to small clear-flowing streams, from which the tadpoles of Viridihyla multiplica have been found and so it is assumed that the genus have similar breeding habitats.

== Species ==
Many of the species in this genus were part of the wastebasket genus Litoria until it was split into multiple genera after a comprehensive phylogenetic study in 2025:

- Viridihyla christianbergmanni (Günther, 2008)
- Viridihyla gasconi (Richards, Oliver, Krey, and Tjaturadi, 2009)
- Viridihyla multiplica (Tyler, 1964)
- Viridihyla spectabilis (Richards and Donnellan, 2023)
- Viridihyla wapogaensis (Richards and Iskandar, 2001)
