= Oreophryne anulata =

Conservation status
- Least Concern (IUCN 3.1)

Scientific classification
- Kingdom: Animalia
- Phylum: Chordata
- Class: Amphibia
- Order: Anura
- Family: Microhylidae
- Genus: Oreophryne
- Species: O. anulata

Binomial name
- Oreophryne anulata (Stejneger, 1908)

Synonyms
- Phrynixalus anulatus Stejneger, 1908; Chaperina visaya Taylor, 1920

Species of frog

Oreophryne anulata is a species of frog in the family Microhylidae. It is endemic to the Philippines and is known from Mindanao, Biliran, Siargao, and Leyte; it probably occurs in some smaller, intervening islands too. Common names Mindanao cross frog and Davao cross frog have been proposed for it; the latter in apparent reference to its type locality, "Davao", even though it probably is in error.

== Description ==
Adult males measure 17–18 mm (0.67–0.71 in) and adult females 19–22 mm (0.75–0.87 in) in snout–vent length. Despite the small size, these frogs have a stocky appearance. The head is as wide as the body and wider than it is long. The snout is rounded or obtusely pointed. The tympanum is visible, or occasionally, hidden by skin. Preserved specimens are dorsally brown, usually with a dark H- or W-shaped mark. A dark crossbar is present between the eyes. The fingers and toes bear well-developed discs. Webbing is absent. Males have a single subgular vocal sac.

== Habitat and conservation ==
Oreophryne anulata is an arboreal frog that inhabits mossy forest, but has also been found in disturbed lower montane forest. Choruses of calling males have been observed beside ponds and lakes. However, breeding does not require water as development is direct (i.e, there is no free-living larval stage).

This species is common in suitable habitat, but it is threatened by the destruction and conversion of both lowland and montane rainforest habitats. It is present in some national parks, includein Mount Malindang National Park.
