= Carl Wilhelm Erich Zimmer =

German zoologist (1873–1950)

Carl Wilhelm Erich Zimmer (Sondershausen, 29 September 1873 – Hüll bei Wolnzach, 8 November 1950) was a German zoologist specialising in crustaceans, especially the order Cumacea.

He studied zoology at the University of Strasbourg, the Ludwig-Maximilians-Universität München, and the University of Breslau, receiving his doctorate in 1897. In 1912, he was appointed second director at the Zoological State Collection of Munich, whereas in 1917, he became the director. From 1924 to 1937, he was a full professor and director of the zoological museum in Berlin.

The crustacean genus Zimmeriana (Hale, 1946; family Gynodiastylidae) commemorates his name, as do species with the epithet of zimmeri, including three species of frogs (Arthroleptis zimmeri, Oreophryne zimmeri, and Pseudophilautus zimmeri) and a species of lizard (Sphenomorphus zimmeri). He is the taxonomic authority for the krill species Euphausia hanseni.

== Selected publications ==
- Die Cumaceen der "Deutschen Tiefsee-Expedition", 1908 – Cumacea from the German Deepsea-Expedition. (in German).
- Südwestafrikanische Schizopoden, 1912 – Southwest African Schizopoda. (in German).
- Untersuchungen an diastyliden (Ordnung Cumacea), 1930 – Research of Diastylidae (order Cumacea). (in German).
- "California Crustacea of the order Cumacea"; translated into English, 1937.
- Cumacea, 1941.
- "Cumaceans of the American Atlantic boreal coast region (Crustacea, Peracarida)"; translated into English, 1979.
