= Sphenomorphus zimmeri =

Scientific classification
- Kingdom: Animalia
- Phylum: Chordata
- Class: Reptilia
- Order: Squamata
- Family: Scincidae
- Genus: Sphenomorphus
- Species: S. zimmeri

Binomial name
- Sphenomorphus zimmeri (Ahl, 1933)

Synonyms
- Lygosoma (Otosaurus) zimmeri Ahl, 1933; Sphenomorphus zimmeri — Bauer, Shea & R. Günther, 2003

Species of lizard

Sphenomorphus zimmeri is a species of skink, a lizard in the family Scincidae. The species is endemic to Sulawesi, Indonesia.

== Etymology ==
The specific name, zimmeri, is in honor of German zoologist Carl Wilhelm Erich Zimmer.

== Reproduction ==
The mode of reproduction of S. zimmeri is unknown.
