= Philautus larutensis =

Conservation status
- Data Deficient (IUCN 3.1)

Scientific classification
- Kingdom: Animalia
- Phylum: Chordata
- Class: Amphibia
- Order: Anura
- Family: Rhacophoridae
- Genus: Philautus
- Species: P. larutensis

Binomial name
- Philautus larutensis van Kampen, 1923

Synonyms
- Philautus similis van Kampen, 1923

Species of frog

Philautus larutensis is a species of frog in the family Rhacophoridae. It is endemic to Indonesia.

Its natural habitat is subtropical or tropical moist montane forests. It is threatened by habitat loss.
