= Oreophryne crucifer =

Conservation status
- Least Concern (IUCN 3.1)

Scientific classification
- Kingdom: Animalia
- Phylum: Chordata
- Class: Amphibia
- Order: Anura
- Family: Microhylidae
- Genus: Oreophryne
- Species: O. crucifer

Binomial name
- Oreophryne crucifer (van Kampen, 1913)

Species of frog

Oreophryne crucifer is a species of frog in the family Microhylidae. It is endemic to West Papua, Indonesia. Its natural habitats are subtropical or tropical moist lowland forests and subtropical or tropical moist montane forests.
