= Oreophryne albopunctata =

Conservation status
- Least Concern (IUCN 3.1)

Scientific classification
- Kingdom: Animalia
- Phylum: Chordata
- Class: Amphibia
- Order: Anura
- Family: Microhylidae
- Genus: Oreophryne
- Species: O. albopunctata

Binomial name
- Oreophryne albopunctata (van Kampen, 1909)

Species of frog

Oreophryne albopunctata is a species of frog in the family Microhylidae. It is endemic to West Papua, Indonesia. Its natural habitat is subtropical or tropical moist lowland forests.
