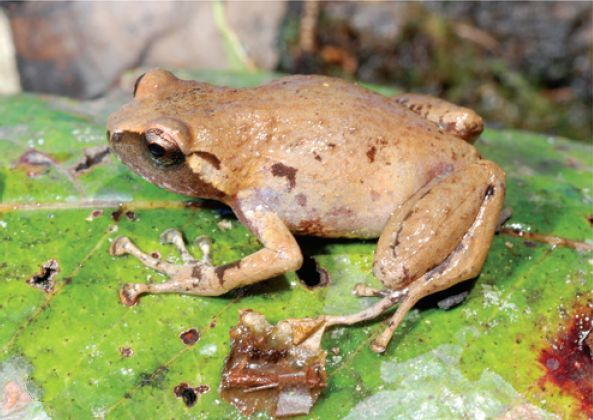
- Paratype of Oreophryne anamiatoi

Scientific classification
- Kingdom: Animalia
- Phylum: Chordata
- Class: Amphibia
- Order: Anura
- Family: Microhylidae
- Genus: Oreophryne
- Species: O. anamiatoi

Binomial name
- Oreophryne anamiatoi Kraus & Allison, 2009

= Oreophryne anamiatoi =

Species of frog

Oreophryne anamiatoi is a species of frog in the family Microhylidae endemic to Papua New Guinea.

== Distribution ==
Oreophryne anamiatoi is endemic to the Southern Highlands Province in Papua New Guinea. It has only been found in its type locality, the north-eastern slopes of the mountains Muller Range, at an altitude of approximately 1,800 metres.

== Etymology ==
Its specific name, anamiatoi, honours Jim Anamiato of the National Museum of Papua, New Guinea for his work on the various expeditions, including the one during which this species was discovered.
