= Moaif tree frog =

Conservation status
- Data Deficient (IUCN 3.1)

Scientific classification
- Kingdom: Animalia
- Phylum: Chordata
- Class: Amphibia
- Order: Anura
- Family: Pelodryadidae
- Genus: Papuahyla
- Species: P. mystax

Binomial name
- Papuahyla mystax (van Kampen, 1906)

Synonyms
- Hyla mystax (Van Kampen, 1906); Litoria mystax (Tyler, 1971)

Species of amphibian

The Moaif tree frog (Papuahyla mystax) is a species of frog in the family Pelodryadidae, endemic to West Papua, Indonesia. Its natural habitat is subtropical or tropical moist lowland forests.
