= Austrochaperina basipalmata =

Conservation status
- Least Concern (IUCN 3.1)

Scientific classification
- Kingdom: Animalia
- Phylum: Chordata
- Class: Amphibia
- Order: Anura
- Family: Microhylidae
- Genus: Austrochaperina
- Species: A. basipalmata

Binomial name
- Austrochaperina basipalmata (van Kampen, 1906)

Synonyms
- Chaperina basipalmata (van Kampen, 1906); Chaperina quatuorlobata (Wandolleck, 1911)

Species of frog

Austrochaperina basipalmata is a species of frog in the family Microhylidae. It is endemic to the mountain ranges of northern New Guinea and is found between Tawarin River in Papua, Western New Guinea (Indonesia) and Torricelli Mountains in Papua New Guinea.

== Description ==
Adult males measure 32–34 mm (1.3–1.3 in) and adult females 33–39 mm (1.3–1.5 in) in snout–vent length. The tip of the snout is somewhat pointed and conspicuously whitened in adult males but the shout is rounded in adult females, rarely showing even a trace of white; juveniles of both sexes have dark snouts. The head is slightly narrower than the body. The eyes are relatively small. The tympanum is scarcely visible. The finger and toe tips bear grooved discs. The toes are basally webbed. Skin is smooth to slightly rugose dorsally and smooth ventrally. Preserved specimens are dorsally brown, often with some indistinct darker spotting or mottling, rarely with well-defined darker spots. The undersides are pale tan with more or less distinct darker mottling on the chin, chest, and hind legs.

== Habitat and conservation ==
Austrochaperina basipalmata occurs in rainforests in association with small mountain streams at elevations of 940–1,200 m (3,080–3,940 ft) above sea level. It is locally abundant. Development is direct (i.e. there is no free-living larval stage). There are no known threats to this species. It might be present in the Cyclops Mountains Nature Reserve.
