= Rhacophorus bifasciatus =

Conservation status
- Least Concern (IUCN 3.1)

Scientific classification
- Kingdom: Animalia
- Phylum: Chordata
- Class: Amphibia
- Order: Anura
- Family: Rhacophoridae
- Genus: Rhacophorus
- Species: R. bifasciatus

Binomial name
- Rhacophorus bifasciatus van Kampen, 1923

Species of frog

Rhacophorus bifasciatus is a species of frog in the family Rhacophoridae endemic to Indonesia. Its natural habitats are subtropical or tropical moist lowland forests, subtropical or tropical moist montane forests, and rivers. It is threatened by habitat loss.
