= Hylarana persimilis =

Conservation status
- Data Deficient (IUCN 3.1)

Scientific classification
- Kingdom: Animalia
- Phylum: Chordata
- Class: Amphibia
- Order: Anura
- Family: Ranidae
- Genus: Hylarana
- Species: H. persimilis

Binomial name
- Hylarana persimilis (van Kampen, 1923)

Synonyms
- Rana persimilis van Kampen, 1923

Species of frogs

Hylarana persimilis, commonly known as the Sumatra frog, is a species of frog in the family Ranidae. It is native to Aceh, Sumatra, Indonesia. It is only known from the holotype collected from a lakeside.
