= Papuahyla =

Scientific classification
- Kingdom: Animalia
- Phylum: Chordata
- Class: Amphibia
- Order: Anura
- Family: Pelodryadidae
- Genus: Papuahyla; Donnellan, Mahony, and Richards, 2025

Species
- See text

Genus of amphibians

Papuahyla is a genus of tree frogs in the family Pelodryadidae, native to New Guinea and its surrounding islands, Bismark Archipelago, Admiralty Archipelago and eastern Indonesia.

Species of this genus inhabit wetland, swamps and grasslands, either permanent or ephemeral, and are usually not found in forests. All species except the Barabuna tree frog are found in the lowlands.

== Species ==
Many of the species in this genus were part of the wastebasket genus Litoria until it was split into multiple genera after a comprehensive phylogenetic study in 2025:

- Papuahyla albolabris (Wandolleck, 1911)
- Papuahyla bibonius (Kraus and Allison, 2004)
- Papuahyla chloristona (Menzies, Richards, and Tyler, 2008)
- Papuahyla contrastens (Tyler, 1968)
- Papuahyla eurynastes (Menzies, Richards, and Tyler, 2008)
- Papuahyla lodesdema (Menzies, Richards, and Tyler, 2008)
- Papuahyla louisiadensis (Tyler, 1968)
- Papuahyla mystax (Van Kampen, 1906)
- Papuahyla rubrops (Kraus and Allison, 2004)
