= Kassam tree frog =

Conservation status
- Least Concern (IUCN 3.1)

Scientific classification
- Kingdom: Animalia
- Phylum: Chordata
- Class: Amphibia
- Order: Anura
- Family: Pelodryadidae
- Genus: Viridihyla
- Species: V. multiplica

Binomial name
- Viridihyla multiplica (Tyler, 1964)

Synonyms
- Litoria multiplica (Tyler, 1964)

Species of amphibian

The Kassam tree frog (Viridihyla multiplica) is a species of frog in the family Pelodryadidae, endemic to Papua New Guinea. Its natural habitats are subtropical or tropical moist montane forests, rivers, and heavily degraded former forests. It is threatened by habitat loss.
