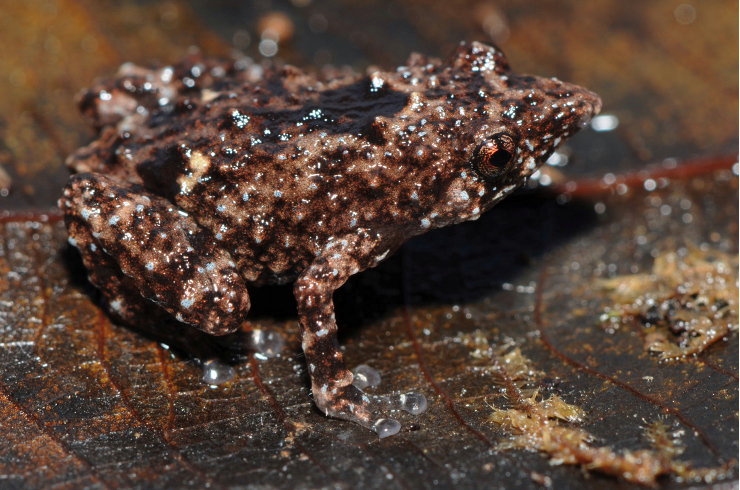

Conservation status
- Least Concern (IUCN 3.1)

Scientific classification
- Kingdom: Animalia
- Phylum: Chordata
- Class: Amphibia
- Order: Anura
- Family: Microhylidae
- Genus: Choerophryne
- Species: C. proboscidea

Binomial name
- Choerophryne proboscidea van Kampen, 1914

= Choerophryne proboscidea =

Species of frog

Choerophryne proboscidea is a species of frog in the family Microhylidae. It is found in West Papua in Indonesia and Papua New Guinea. Its natural habitat is subtropical or tropical moist lowland forests.
