= Ischnohyla gracilis =

Scientific classification
- Kingdom: Animalia
- Phylum: Chordata
- Class: Amphibia
- Order: Anura
- Family: Pelodryadidae
- Genus: Ischnohyla
- Species: I. gracilis

Binomial name
- Ischnohyla gracilis (Richards, Donnellan & Oliver, 2023)

Synonyms
- Litoria gracilis Richards, Donnellan & Oliver, 2023

Species of frog

Ischnohyla gracilis, also known as the slender spotted tree frog, is a species of frog in the subfamily Pelodryadinae. It was described in 2023 by Australian herpetologist Stephen Richards and his colleagues Stephen Donnellan and Paul Oliver.

== Distribution and habitat ==
The species is endemic to New Guinea. It is known from the foothills of the highlands of Papua New Guinea.

== Behaviour ==
When breeding, the frog glue their eggs to leaves above water, presumably as protection from predators, with the tadpoles dropping into the water after emergence.
