= Oreophryne insulana =

Conservation status
- Vulnerable (IUCN 3.1)

Scientific classification
- Kingdom: Animalia
- Phylum: Chordata
- Class: Amphibia
- Order: Anura
- Family: Microhylidae
- Genus: Oreophryne
- Species: O. insulana

Binomial name
- Oreophryne insulana Zweifel, 1956

Species of frog

Oreophryne insulana is a species of frog in the family Microhylidae. It is endemic to Papua New Guinea. Its natural habitat is subtropical or tropical wet/damp environments montane forests.
