= Oreophryne inornata =

Conservation status
- Least Concern (IUCN 3.1)

Scientific classification
- Kingdom: Animalia
- Phylum: Chordata
- Class: Amphibia
- Order: Anura
- Family: Microhylidae
- Genus: Oreophryne
- Species: O. inornata

Binomial name
- Oreophryne inornata Zweifel, 1956

Species of frog

Oreophryne inornata is a species of frog in the family Microhylidae. In Papua New Guinea it is endemic. Its natural habitats are subtropical or tropical moist lowland forests and subtropical or tropical moist montane forests.
