= Oreophryne brachypus =

Conservation status
- Least Concern (IUCN 3.1)

Scientific classification
- Kingdom: Animalia
- Phylum: Chordata
- Class: Amphibia
- Order: Anura
- Family: Microhylidae
- Genus: Oreophryne
- Species: O. brachypus

Binomial name
- Oreophryne brachypus (Werner, 1898)

Synonyms
- Hylella brachypus Werner, 1898

Species of frog

Oreophryne brachypus is a species of frog in the family Microhylidae. It is endemic to the island of New Britain, in the Bismarck Archipelago of Papua New Guinea. Common name Gazelle cross frog has been coined for it.

== Description ==
Adult males measure 19–22.5 mm (0.75–0.89 in) and adult females 21.5–24 mm (0.85–0.94 in) in snout–vent length. The snout rounded but approaching truncate in dorsal view. The eyes are prominent. The tympanum is small. The fingers and the toes have enlarged, grooved terminal disks. The fingers have basal webbing, and the toes are maximally half-webbed. The dorsum is smooth. The ground colour is dusky brown. There are indistinct and slightly darker markings, which commonly include a narrow transocular bar and a W-shaped patch immediately behind the head.

The male advertisement call is a long "squeak", lasting about four seconds and consisting of a single note.

== Habitat and conservation ==
Oreophryne brachypus is an arboreal species that occurs in lowland rainforests, degraded forests, and gardens at elevations up to about 350 m (1,150 ft) above sea level, perhaps higher. Males call from bushes and trees at night. Development is direct, without free-living tadpole stage. It is an abundant species. It might be locally impacted by logging, but it is an adaptable species. It is not known from any protected areas.
