= Vankampen's gecko =

Conservation status
- Least Concern (IUCN 3.1)

Scientific classification
- Kingdom: Animalia
- Phylum: Chordata
- Class: Reptilia
- Order: Squamata
- Suborder: Gekkota
- Family: Gekkonidae
- Genus: Nactus
- Species: N. vankampeni

Binomial name
- Nactus vankampeni (Brongersma, 1933)

Synonyms
- Gymnodactylus vankampeni Brongersma, 1933; Phyllurus vankampeni — Underwood, 1954; Gymnodactylus (Underwoodisaurus) vankampeni — Wermuth, 1965; Cyrtodactylus vankampeni — W.C. Brown & F.S. Parker, 1973; Nactus vankampeni — Kluge, 1983

Species of lizard

Vankampen's gecko (Nactus vankampeni) is a species of lizard in the family Gekkonidae. The species is endemic to New Guinea.

== Etymology ==
The specific name, vankampeni, is in honor of Dutch herpetologist Pieter Nicolaas van Kampen.

== Geographic range ==
On the island of New Guinea, N. vankampeni is found in Indonesia and northeastern Papua New Guinea.

== Habitat ==
The preferred natural habitat of N. vankampeni is forest.

== Reproduction ==
N. vankampeni is oviparous.
