= Papuahyla bibonius =

Scientific classification
- Kingdom: Animalia
- Phylum: Chordata
- Class: Amphibia
- Order: Anura
- Family: Pelodryadidae
- Genus: Papuahyla
- Species: P. bibonius

Binomial name
- Papuahyla bibonius (Kraus & Allison, 2004 )

Synonyms
- Litoria bibonius Kraus & Allison, 2004

Species of frog

Papuahyla bibonius is a species of frog of the family Pelodryadidae.

== Distribution ==
This species is found in the D'Entrecasteaux, Normanby and Goodenough islands in Papua New Guinea.

== Description ==
It can be distinguished from other lowland New Guinea green tree frogs by the following features: only one third of its fingers are webbed, it has no vomerine teeth, it has a smooth tympanium instead of a granular one, and its snout is long and pointed. The hidden surfaces of its thighs are yellow and its dorsum is uniformly green.

Like other members of Pelodryadidae, it has horizontal irises, but unlike other Papuan species it has red eyes.
