= Ischnohyla daraiensis =

Scientific classification
- Kingdom: Animalia
- Phylum: Chordata
- Class: Amphibia
- Order: Anura
- Family: Pelodryadidae
- Genus: Ischnohyla
- Species: I. daraiensis

Binomial name
- Ischnohyla daraiensis (Richards, Donnellan & Oliver, 2023)

Synonyms
- Litoria daraiensis Richards, Donnellan & Oliver, 2023

Species of frog

Ischnohyla daraiensis, also known as the Darai Plateau tree frog, is a species of frog in the family Pelodryadidae. It was described in 2023 by Australian herpetologist Stephen Richards and his colleagues Stephen Donnellan and Paul Oliver. The specific epithet daraiensis refers to the type locality.

== Distribution and habitat ==
The species is endemic to New Guinea and is known only from the Darai Plateau in the Gulf Province of Papua New Guinea.
