= Wandolleck's white-lipped tree frog =

Conservation status
- Data Deficient (IUCN 3.1)

Scientific classification
- Kingdom: Animalia
- Phylum: Chordata
- Class: Amphibia
- Order: Anura
- Family: Pelodryadidae
- Genus: Papuahyla
- Species: P. albolabris

Binomial name
- Papuahyla albolabris (Wandolleck, 1911)

Synonyms
- Litoria albolabris (Wandolleck, 1911)

Species of amphibian

Wandolleck's white-lipped tree frog (Papuahyla albolabris) is a species of frog in the family Pelodryadidae. It is endemic to Papua New Guinea. Its natural habitats are subtropical or tropical moist lowland forests and subtropical or tropical dry lowland grassland.
