= Barabuna tree frog =

Conservation status
- Least Concern (IUCN 3.1)

Scientific classification
- Kingdom: Animalia
- Phylum: Chordata
- Class: Amphibia
- Order: Anura
- Family: Pelodryadidae
- Genus: Papuahyla
- Species: P. contrastens

Binomial name
- Papuahyla contrastens (Tyler, 1968)

Synonyms
- *Hyla contrastens (Tyler, 1968): Litoria contrastens (Tyler, 1971)

Species of amphibian

The Barabuna tree frog (Papuahyla contrastens) is a species of frog in the family Pelodryadidae that is endemic to Papua New Guinea. Its natural habitats are swamps and rural gardens. It is threatened by habitat loss.
