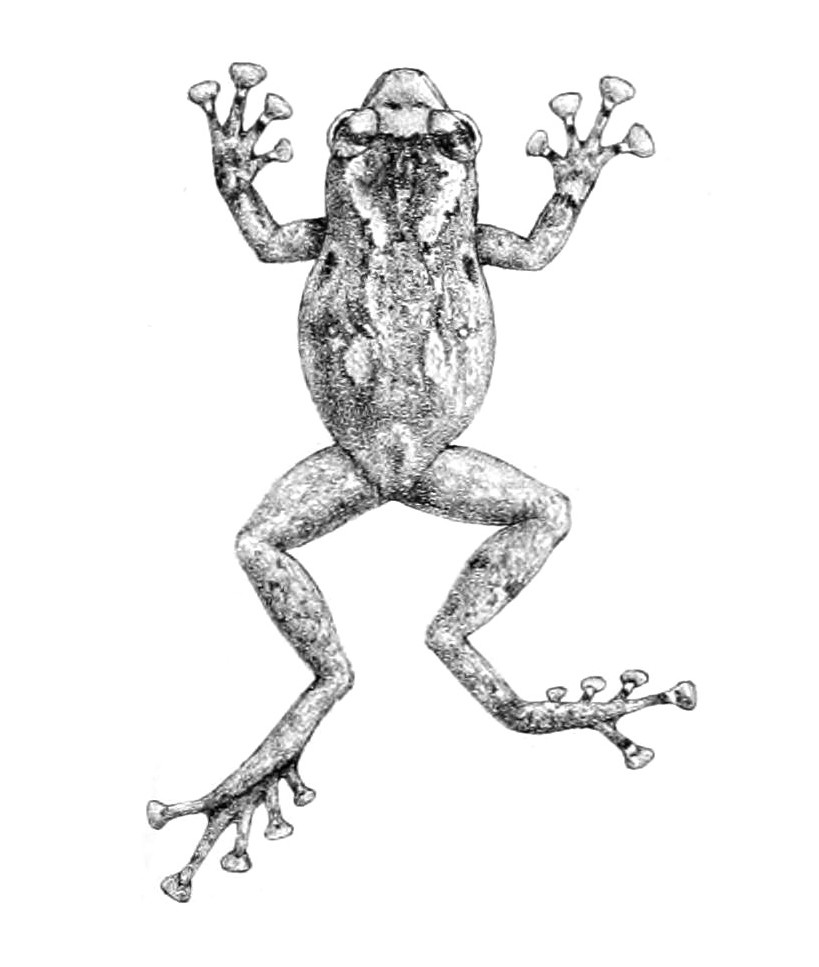

Conservation status
- Data Deficient (IUCN 3.1)

Scientific classification
- Kingdom: Animalia
- Phylum: Chordata
- Class: Amphibia
- Order: Anura
- Family: Microhylidae
- Genus: Oreophryne
- Species: O. loriae

Binomial name
- Oreophryne loriae (Boulenger, 1898)

= Oreophryne loriae =

Species of frog

Oreophryne loriae is a species of frog in the family Microhylidae. It is endemic to Papua New Guinea. Its natural habitat is subtropical or tropical moist lowland forests.
