= Papuahyla rubrops =

Conservation status
- Least Concern (IUCN 3.1)

Scientific classification
- Kingdom: Animalia
- Phylum: Chordata
- Class: Amphibia
- Order: Anura
- Family: Pelodryadidae
- Genus: Papuahyla
- Species: P. rubrops

Binomial name
- Papuahyla rubrops (Kraus & Allison, 2004)

Synonyms
- Litoria rubrops Kraus & Allison, 2004

Species of frog

Papuahyla rubrops is a species of frog in the family Pelodryadidae. It is endemic to Papua New Guinea. Its natural habitats are subtropical or tropical moist lowland forests and rivers.
