= Oreophryne anthonyi =

Conservation status
- Least Concern (IUCN 3.1)

Scientific classification
- Kingdom: Animalia
- Phylum: Chordata
- Class: Amphibia
- Order: Anura
- Family: Microhylidae
- Genus: Oreophryne
- Species: O. anthonyi

Binomial name
- Oreophryne anthonyi (Boulenger, 1897)

Species of frog

Oreophryne anthonyi is a species of frog in the family Microhylidae. It is endemic to Papua New Guinea. Its natural habitat is subtropical or tropical moist montane forests.
