= Oreophryne wolterstorffi =

Conservation status
- Data Deficient (IUCN 3.1)

Scientific classification
- Kingdom: Animalia
- Phylum: Chordata
- Class: Amphibia
- Order: Anura
- Family: Microhylidae
- Genus: Oreophryne
- Species: O. wolterstorffi

Binomial name
- Oreophryne wolterstorffi (Werner, 1901)

Synonyms
- Hylella wolterstorffi Werner, 1901; Hyla wolterstorffi (Werner, 1901)

Species of amphibian

Oreophryne wolterstorffi is a species of frog in the family Microhylidae. It is endemic to Papua New Guinea and only known from a single specimen collected from "Deutsch-Neu-Guinea", in what now is Madang Province. Common name Wolterstorff's cross frog has been coined for it.

== Etymology ==
The specific name wolterstorffi honours Willy Wolterstorff, German geologist and herpetologist.

== Discovery and distribution ==
The holotype was collected by Ernst Tappenbeck when he explored the areas west of Astrolabe Bay (south of Madang) in 1896 and along the river Ramu in 1898. It is not possible to specify where along his route of travel the specimen was collected. No other specimens are known.

== Description ==
The holotype is of unspecified sex and measures 22.6 mm (0.89 in) in snout–vent length. The snout is narrowly rounded seen from above but vertical in profile. The eyes are relatively large. The head is slightly narrower than the body. The canthus rostralis is rounded. The fingers and toes bear well-developed discs. The fingers have no webbing whereas the toes have some webbing.

The colors of the specimen are now faded. The original species description, written a few years after the specimen was collected, describes coloration as follows:

"Upperside brownish white, gray spotted. A dark brown stripe passes horizontally from the posterior corner of the eye to above the eardrum, but not beyond the head. Snout and face pale to between the eyes, posterior of head dark brown, the two colors sharply separated from one another. Limbs indistinctly flecked with brown." (translated from Werner (1901), Ueber Reptilien und Batrachier aus Ecuador und Neu Guinea, page 613)

Oreophryne wolterstorffi is most similar to Oreophryne geislerorum, but the latter is smaller and has finger webbing. The known range of Oreophryne geislerorum is at least 200 km separate from the area of the origin of Oreophryne wolterstorffi.

== Habitat ==
The habitat of Oreophryne wolterstorffi is unknown but it is presumed to be tropical forest.
