= Papuahyla chloristona =

Conservation status
- Least Concern (IUCN 3.1)

Scientific classification
- Kingdom: Animalia
- Phylum: Chordata
- Class: Amphibia
- Order: Anura
- Family: Pelodryadidae
- Genus: Papuahyla
- Species: P. chloristona

Binomial name
- Papuahyla chloristona (Menzies, Richards, and Tyler, 2008)

Synonyms
- Litoria chloristona Menzies, Richards and Tyler, 2008

Species of amphibian

Papuahyla chloristona is a species of frog in the family Pelodryadidae. It is endemic to Papua New Guinea. Scientists have observed it near the Kikori River, from sea level to 500 meters above sea level. The type locality is Port Essington in Australia.

The adult male frog measures about 19.6 to 23.8 mm long in snout-vent length, and the adult female measures 23.7 to 27.4 mm. It has large eyes, and a pointed nose, and a white labial stripe. The skin of the dorsum is bright green, fading into bronze down the sides. The inner thighs are orange-red in color.

The female frog lays eggs in still water. The eggs float to the surface of the water. The tadpoles have wide dorsal fins and narrow ventral fins. They have bands of color.

The name chloristona comes from the Greek words chloros for "green," elaschistos for "small," and ontos for "living thing."
