= Umar treefrog =

Conservation status
- Data Deficient (IUCN 3.1)

Scientific classification
- Kingdom: Animalia
- Phylum: Chordata
- Class: Amphibia
- Order: Anura
- Family: Pelodryadidae
- Genus: Ischnohyla
- Species: I. umarensis

Binomial name
- Ischnohyla umarensis (R.Günther, 2004)

Synonyms
- Litoria umarensis Günther, 2004

Species of amphibian

The Umar tree frog (Ischnohyla umarensis) is a species of frog in the family Pelodryadidae.

It is endemic to West Papua, Indonesia. Its natural habitats are subtropical or tropical moist lowland forests, subtropical or tropical swamps, shrub-dominated wetlands, swamps, and heavily degraded former forests.
