= Viridihyla wapogaensis =

Conservation status
- Data Deficient (IUCN 3.1)

Scientific classification
- Kingdom: Animalia
- Phylum: Chordata
- Class: Amphibia
- Order: Anura
- Family: Pelodryadidae
- Genus: Viridihyla
- Species: V. wapogaensis

Binomial name
- Viridihyla wapogaensis Richards and Iskandar, 2001

Synonyms
- Litoria wapogaensis Richards and Iskander, 2001

Species of frog

Viridihyla wapogaensis is a species of frog in the family Pelodryadidae. It is endemic to West Papua, Indonesia, and only known from its type locality in the headwaters of the Wapoga River at about 1,100 m (3,600 ft) above sea level.

Its natural habitat is tropical rainforest with small, slow-flowing streams, its breeding habitat. While the known range is very small, it was reasonably common there. There are no known threats to this species.
