= Oreophryne frontifasciata =

Conservation status
- Data Deficient (IUCN 3.1)

Scientific classification
- Kingdom: Animalia
- Phylum: Chordata
- Class: Amphibia
- Order: Anura
- Family: Microhylidae
- Genus: Oreophryne
- Species: O. frontifasciata

Binomial name
- Oreophryne frontifasciata (Horst, 1883)

Species of amphibian

Oreophryne frontifasciata is a species of frog of the family Microhylidae. It is endemic to Indonesia. Its natural habitat is subtropical or tropical moist lowland forests.
