= Oreophryne unicolor =

Conservation status
- Data Deficient (IUCN 3.1)

Scientific classification
- Kingdom: Animalia
- Phylum: Chordata
- Class: Amphibia
- Order: Anura
- Family: Microhylidae
- Genus: Oreophryne
- Species: O. unicolor

Binomial name
- Oreophryne unicolor Günther, 2003

Species of frog

Oreophryne unicolor is a species of frog in the family Microhylidae. It is endemic to West Papua, Indonesia, and known from the Wondiwoi Mountains at the base of the Wandammen Peninsula, Papua province. Frogs with similar call have been observed in the Fakfak Mountains, but it remains to be ascertained that these represent the same species. The specific name unicolor refers to the uniformly coloured dorsal side of the body.

== Description ==
The type series consists of two males, measuring about 29 mm (1.1 in) in snout–vent length, and a sub-adult female, measuring 24 mm (0.94 in). The dorsal colour is greenish or brownish and uniform, in contrast to most other Oreophryne species that bear large spots. Ventral surface is whitish. Tympanum is nearly invisible. Fingers have large discs; toes have smaller discs and basal webbing.

Males call most actively in early evening. The call is a series of monotonous high-pitched whistles or beeps.

== Habitat and conservation ==
Natural habitat of Oreophryne unicolor is tropical rainforest at elevations of 500–900 m (1,600–3,000 ft) asl. They are hard to find as males typically call from perches 3–6 metres above the ground.

Threats to it are unknown. Its range might include the Wondiwoi Nature Reserve.
