= Oreophryne asplenicola =

Conservation status
- Data Deficient (IUCN 3.1)

Scientific classification
- Kingdom: Animalia
- Phylum: Chordata
- Class: Amphibia
- Order: Anura
- Family: Microhylidae
- Genus: Oreophryne
- Species: O. asplenicola

Binomial name
- Oreophryne asplenicola Günther, 2003

Species of frog

Oreophryne asplenicola is a species of frog in the family Microhylidae. It is endemic to West Papua, Indonesia. Its natural habitat is subtropical or tropical moist lowland forests. It is threatened by habitat loss.
