= Oreophryne jeffersoniana =

Conservation status
- Least Concern (IUCN 3.1)

Scientific classification
- Kingdom: Animalia
- Phylum: Chordata
- Class: Amphibia
- Order: Anura
- Family: Microhylidae
- Genus: Oreophryne
- Species: O. jeffersoniana

Binomial name
- Oreophryne jeffersoniana Dunn, 1928

Species of frog

Oreophryne jeffersoniana is a species of frog in the family Microhylidae. It is endemic to Indonesia. Its natural habitats are subtropical or tropical dry forests and subtropical or tropical dry shrubland. It is threatened by habitat loss.
