= Oreophryne brevicrus =

Conservation status
- Data Deficient (IUCN 3.1)

Scientific classification
- Kingdom: Animalia
- Phylum: Chordata
- Class: Amphibia
- Order: Anura
- Family: Microhylidae
- Genus: Oreophryne
- Species: O. brevicrus

Binomial name
- Oreophryne brevicrus Zweifel, 1956

Species of frog

Oreophryne brevicrus is a species of frog in the family Microhylidae. It is endemic to West Papua, Indonesia. Its natural habitats are subtropical or tropical moist montane forests and subtropical or tropical high-altitude grassland.
