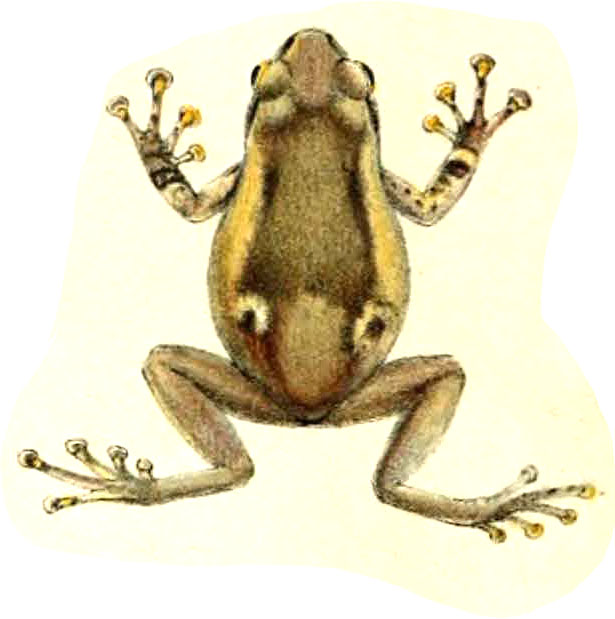

Conservation status
- Vulnerable (IUCN 3.1)

Scientific classification
- Kingdom: Animalia
- Phylum: Chordata
- Class: Amphibia
- Order: Anura
- Family: Microhylidae
- Genus: Oreophryne
- Species: O. variabilis

Binomial name
- Oreophryne variabilis (Boulenger, 1896)

= Oreophryne variabilis =

Species of frog

Oreophryne variabilis is a species of frog in the family Microhylidae. It is endemic to Sulawesi, Indonesia. Its natural habitat is subtropical or tropical moist montane forests. It is threatened by habitat loss.
