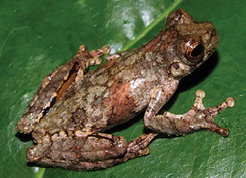

Conservation status
- Least Concern (IUCN 3.1)

Scientific classification
- Kingdom: Animalia
- Phylum: Chordata
- Class: Amphibia
- Order: Anura
- Family: Hylidae
- Genus: Dendropsophus
- Species: D. giesleri

Binomial name
- Dendropsophus giesleri (Mertens, 1950)

= Dendropsophus giesleri =

Species of frog

Dendropsophus giesleri is a species of frog in the family Hylidae. It is endemic to Brazil. Its natural habitats are subtropical or tropical moist lowland forests, subtropical or tropical moist montane forests, freshwater marshes, and intermittent freshwater marshes. It is threatened by habitat loss.
