= Oreophryne flava =

Conservation status
- Data Deficient (IUCN 3.1)

Scientific classification
- Kingdom: Animalia
- Phylum: Chordata
- Class: Amphibia
- Order: Anura
- Family: Microhylidae
- Genus: Oreophryne
- Species: O. flava

Binomial name
- Oreophryne flava Parker, 1934

Species of frog

Oreophryne flava is a species of frog in the family Microhylidae. It is endemic to West Papua, Indonesia. Its natural habitats are subtropical or tropical moist lowland forests and subtropical or tropical moist montane forests.
