= Papuahyla eurynastes =

Scientific classification
- Kingdom: Animalia
- Phylum: Chordata
- Class: Amphibia
- Order: Anura
- Family: Pelodryadidae
- Genus: Papuahyla
- Species: P. eurynastes

Binomial name
- Papuahyla eurynastes (Menzies, Richards, and Tyler, 2008)

Synonyms
- Litoria eurynastes Menzies, Richards and Tyler, 2008

Species of frog

Papuahyla eurynastes is a frog in the family Pelodryadidae, endemic to Papua New Guinea. It resembles Carichyla bicolor, but it is larger.

Adult male frogs measure 25.7 to 31.5 mm in snout-vent length. Adult female frogs measure 27.3 to 33.0 mm. Some adult frogs have vomerine teeth in their upper jaws. They have more webbing on the hind feet than on the forefeet. There are five populations of Papuahyla eurynastes living in the wild, and they are not all the same color. They can be bright green, yellow-green, or brownish-green. Some of them have gold or light green stripes. There is a disc on each finger.

The Greek name eurynastes means wide-dwelling.
