= Oreophryne rookmaakeri =

Conservation status
- Endangered (IUCN 3.1)

Scientific classification
- Kingdom: Animalia
- Phylum: Chordata
- Class: Amphibia
- Order: Anura
- Family: Microhylidae
- Genus: Oreophryne
- Species: O. rookmaakeri

Binomial name
- Oreophryne rookmaakeri Mertens, 1927

Species of amphibian

Oreophryne rookmaakeri is a species of frog in the family Microhylidae. It is endemic to the island of Flores, Indonesia. The specific name rookmaakeri honours Hendrik Roelof Rookmaaker, a Dutch colonial administrator who was resident on Flores. Common name Flores cross frog has been coined for this species.

== Distribution ==
The type locality is "Rana Mese" in western Flores, although the IUCN Red List of Threatened Species maps it further east on the island.

== Description ==
One paratype, held at the Bogor Zoology Museum, measures about 26 mm (1.0 in) in snout–vent length. Another paratype at the Museum of Comparative Zoology measures about 30 mm (1.2 in) in snout–vent length.

== Habitat and conservation ==
Oreophryne rookmaakeri occurs in tropical dry forest and shrubland at elevations of 900–1,200 m (3,000–3,900 ft) above sea level. It lives in bushes and trees. Presumably, it lays its eggs on the ground and the eggs develop directly to froglets, without free-living larval stage.

There is little specific information on threats to this species, but it would probably be suffer from extensive habitat loss. It is not known to occur in any protected area.
