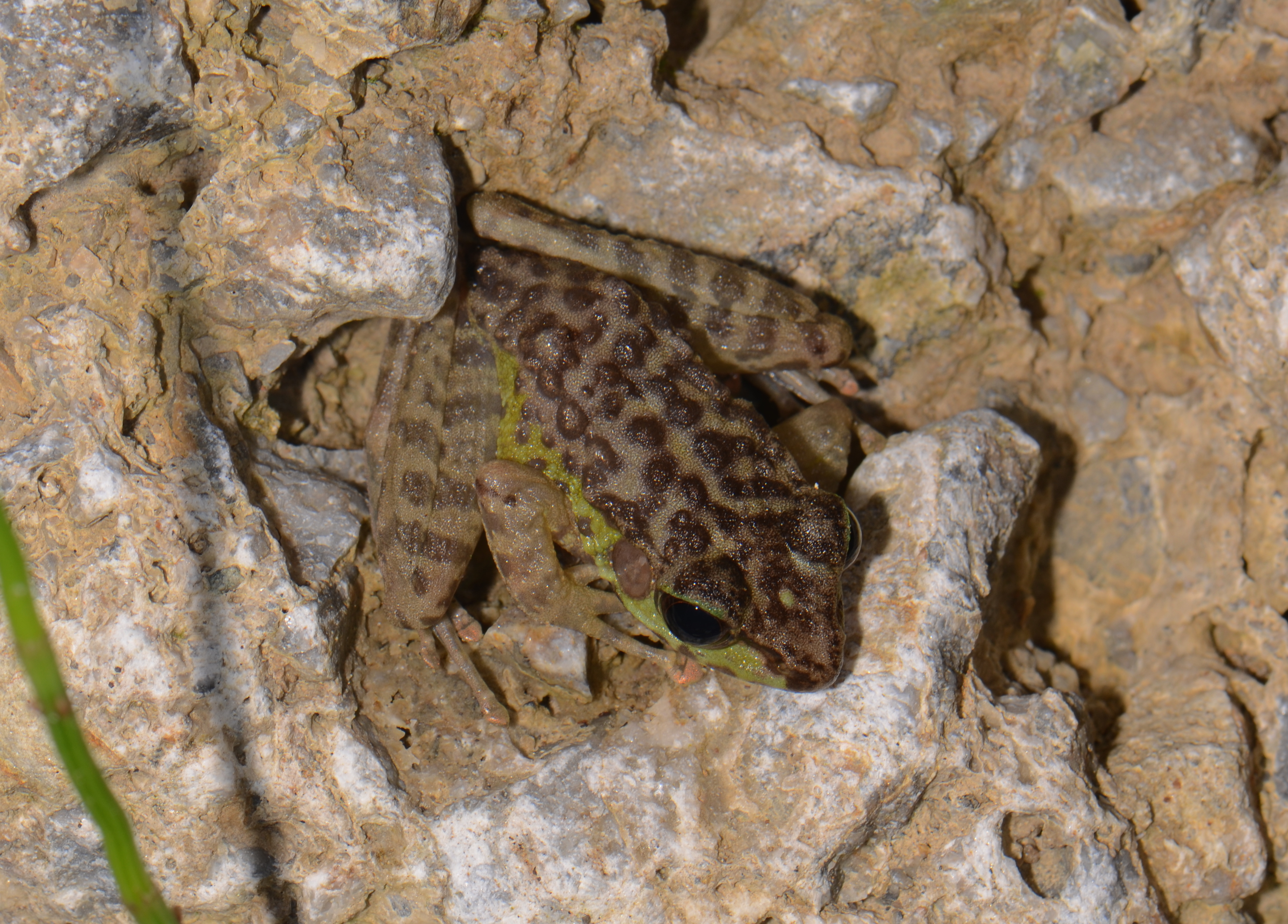

Conservation status
- Least Concern (IUCN 3.1)

Scientific classification
- Kingdom: Animalia
- Phylum: Chordata
- Class: Amphibia
- Order: Anura
- Family: Ranidae
- Genus: Sumaterana
- Species: S. crassiovis

Binomial name
- Sumaterana crassiovis (Boulenger, 1920)

Synonyms
- Rana pantherina van Kampen, 1910 – preoccupied by Rana tigrina var. pantherina Steindachner, 1867; Rana crassiovis Boulenger, 1920; Rana kampeni Boulenger, 1920 – replacement name for Rana pantherina; Hydrophylax crassiovis (Boulenger, 1920); Hydrophylax kampeni (Boulenger, 1920); Hylarana crassiovis (Boulenger, 1920); Hylarana kampeni (Boulenger, 1920); Chalcorana kampeni (Boulenger, 1920); Chalcorana crassiovis (Boulenger, 1920)

= Sumaterana crassiovis =

Species of amphibian

Sumaterana crassiovis is a species of true frog. It is endemic to Sumatra, Indonesia. It is also known as the Bander Baru frog, Korinchi frog, and Kerinci cascade frog.

Sumaterana crassiovis lives in primary submontane and montane rainforest along streams above 700 m (2,300 ft); it is especially common at around 1,000 m (3,300 ft) above sea level. It can occur in slightly disturbed forest habitats and agroforestry areas. The tadpoles use their ventral suckers to cling on rocks in fast-moving streams.
