= Oreophryne alticola =

Conservation status
- Data Deficient (IUCN 3.1)

Scientific classification
- Kingdom: Animalia
- Phylum: Chordata
- Class: Amphibia
- Order: Anura
- Family: Microhylidae
- Genus: Oreophryne
- Species: O. alticola

Binomial name
- Oreophryne alticola Zweifel, Cogger, and Richards, 2005

Species of frog

Oreophryne alticola is a species of frog in the family Microhylidae. It is endemic to West Papua, Indonesia, and only known from the vicinity of its type locality on the New Guinea Highlands. Its natural habitat is subalpine grassland at elevations of 3,500–3,900 m (11,500–12,800 ft) asl. No significant threats to it are known.
