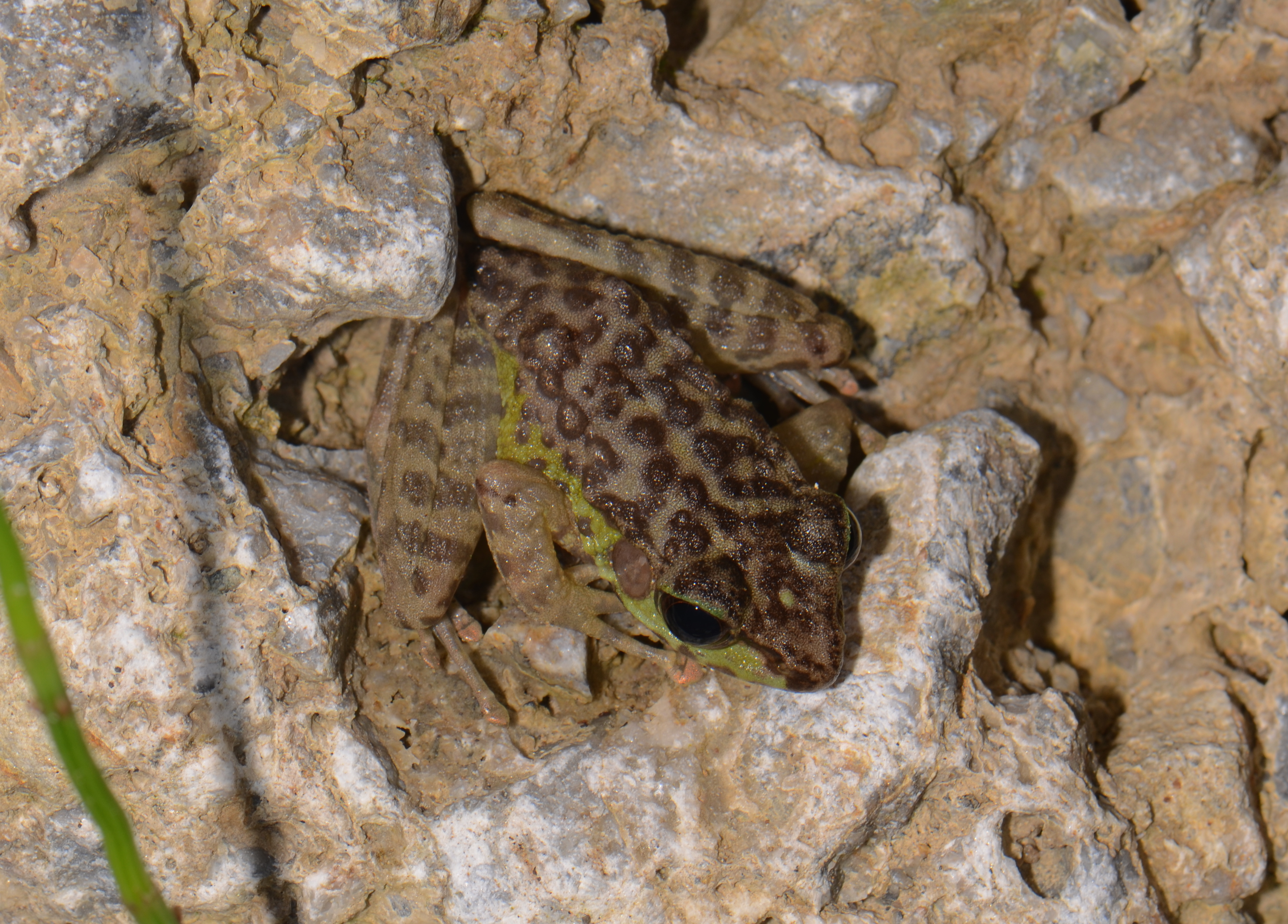
- Sumaterana crassiovis

Scientific classification
- Kingdom: Animalia
- Phylum: Chordata
- Class: Amphibia
- Order: Anura
- Family: Ranidae
- Genus: Sumaterana; Arifin, Smart, Hertwig, Smith, Iskandar, and Haas, 2018

= Sumaterana =

Genus of frogs

Sumaterana, commonly known as Sumatran cascade frogs, is a genus of true frogs in the family Ranidae endemic to the island of Sumatra, Indonesia. Species inhabit fast-flowing streams found in primary or secondary forests.

== Species ==
Three species are recognized:

- Sumaterana crassiovis (Boulenger, 1920)
- Sumaterana dabulescens Arifin, Smart, Hertwig, Smith, Iskandar, and Haas, 2018
- Sumaterana montana Arifin, Smart, Hertwig, Smith, Iskandar, and Haas, 2018
