= Oreophryne sibilans =

Conservation status
- Data Deficient (IUCN 3.1)

Scientific classification
- Kingdom: Animalia
- Phylum: Chordata
- Class: Amphibia
- Order: Anura
- Family: Microhylidae
- Genus: Oreophryne
- Species: O. sibilans

Binomial name
- Oreophryne sibilans Günther, 2003

Species of frog

Oreophryne sibilans is a species of frog in the family Microhylidae. It is endemic to West Papua, Indonesia. It is known from east of the main ridge of the Wondiwoi Mountains at the base of the Wandammen Peninsula, in the Papua province. Similar frogs have been collected from the Yapen island and the Fakfak Mountains, but it remains to be ascertained that these represent the same species. The specific name sibilans refers to the whistling advertisement call of the species.

== Description ==
Males measure 20–23 mm (0.79–0.91 in) and females 24–25 mm (0.94–0.98 in) in snout–vent length. Males and females are similar in colouration and body proportions, but males can be distinguished by their expanded throat skin. Dorsum is greyish or brownish with darker and lighter spots. Ventral surface is strongly mottled in dark brown. Tympanum is barely visible. Fingers have large discs; toes have smaller discs and basal webbing.

== Habitat and conservation ==
The species' natural habitat is tropical moist lowland forests at elevations of 450–800 m (1,480–2,620 ft) asl. They are most often found perched on shrubs, lower tree branches, or grasses some 1–2.5 m (3 ft 3 in – 8 ft 2 in) above the ground.

Oreophryne sibilans is relatively abundant, and among the most abundant frog species in the rainforest of the Wondiwoi Mountains. Threats to it are unknown. It might occur within the Wondiwoi Nature Reserve.
