= Oreophryne clamata =

Conservation status
- Data Deficient (IUCN 3.1)

Scientific classification
- Kingdom: Animalia
- Phylum: Chordata
- Class: Amphibia
- Order: Anura
- Family: Microhylidae
- Genus: Oreophryne
- Species: O. clamata

Binomial name
- Oreophryne clamata Günther, 2003

Species of frog

Oreophryne clamata is a species of frog in the family Microhylidae. It is endemic to West Papua, Indonesia, and known from the Wondiwoi Mountains at the base of the Wandammen Peninsula, Papua province. The specific name clamata, meaning "makes a loud noise", refers to its striking advertisement call. Common name noisy cross frog has been proposed for this species.

== Description ==
The type series consists of six males measuring 19–20 mm (0.75–0.79 in) in snout–vent length. Dorsum is yellowish-brownish with some conspicuous black spots. There is a whitish crossbar between the eyes. Some individuals have a broad, whitish vertebral stripe. Belly and throat grey marbled with dark brown. Tympanum is scarcely visible. Fingers have large discs; toes have smaller discs. Both fingers and toes are unwebbed.

Males start calling shortly after dark. The call is a loud rattle, with males responding to each other's calls.

== Habitat and conservation ==
Natural habitat of Oreophryne clamata is tropical rainforest with patchy, dense undergrowth at elevations of 750–900 m (2,460–2,950 ft) asl. They are hard to find as males are small and typically perch on half-curled leaves 1–3 metres above the ground.

Threats to it are unknown, although logging might be a threat. Its range might include the Wondiwoi Nature Reserve.
