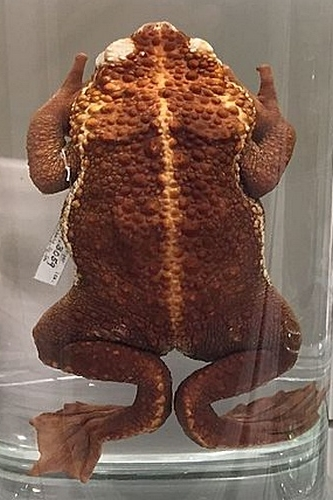
- Pseudobufo subasper at Lee Kong Chian Natural History Museum, Singapore - 2015

Conservation status
- Least Concern (IUCN 3.1)

Scientific classification
- Kingdom: Animalia
- Phylum: Chordata
- Class: Amphibia
- Order: Anura
- Family: Bufonidae
- Genus: Pseudobufo; Johann Jakob von Tschudi, 1838
- Species: P. subasper

Binomial name
- Pseudobufo subasper Tschudi, 1838

= Pseudobufo =

Genus of amphibians

Pseudobufo is a monotypic genus of toads in the family Bufonidae. It is represented by a single species, Pseudobufo subasper. It is found in Indonesia and Malaysia. Its natural habitats are subtropical or tropical swamps. It is threatened by habitat loss in Indonesia and the international wildlife pet trade. This toad can only be found in peat swamps. They have fully webbed hind feet and are closely associated with water.
