= Oreophryne terrestris =

Conservation status
- Data Deficient (IUCN 3.1)

Scientific classification
- Kingdom: Animalia
- Phylum: Chordata
- Class: Amphibia
- Order: Anura
- Family: Microhylidae
- Genus: Oreophryne
- Species: O. terrestris

Binomial name
- Oreophryne terrestris Zweifel, Cogger & Richards, 2005

Species of frog

Oreophryne terrestris is a species of frog in the family Microhylidae. It is endemic to Papua New Guinea. Its natural habitat is subtropical or tropical high-altitude grassland.
