= Viridihyla christianbergmanni =

Conservation status
- Least Concern (IUCN 3.1)

Scientific classification
- Kingdom: Animalia
- Phylum: Chordata
- Class: Amphibia
- Order: Anura
- Family: Pelodryadidae
- Genus: Viridihyla
- Species: V. christianbergmanni

Binomial name
- Viridihyla christianbergmanni (Günther, 2008)

Synonyms
- Litoria christianbergmanni Günther, 2008

Species of frog

Viridihyla christianbergmanni is a frog in the family Pelodryadidae. It is endemic to Indonesia and has been found in the Fakfak Mountains at 860 metres (2,820 ft) above sea level.

The adult male frog measures 26.9–31.2 mm (1.06–1.23 in) long in snout-vent length. The skin of the dorsum is uniform green with very small yellow-white spots on the back and legs. There is more webbing on the hind feet than on the front feet. The backs of the legs are brown in color.

The reporting scientist named this frog after a German scientist, Prof. Dr. Christian Bergmann.
