= Black-dotted tree frog =

Conservation status
- Least Concern (IUCN 3.1)

Scientific classification
- Kingdom: Animalia
- Phylum: Chordata
- Class: Amphibia
- Order: Anura
- Family: Pelodryadidae
- Genus: Ischnohyla
- Species: I. nigropunctata

Binomial name
- Ischnohyla nigropunctata (Meyer, 1875)

Synonyms
- Hyperolius nigropunctatus Meyer, 1875; Hyla nigropunctata (Meyer, 1875); Hyla bernsteini Horst, 1883; Litoria nigropunctata Meyer, 1875

Species of amphibian

The black-dotted tree frog (Ischnohyla nigropunctata) is a species of frog in the subfamily Pelodryadinae. It is found in New Guinea (both in the Indonesian part (West Papua) and in Papua New Guinea) and some adjacent islands, including Yapen, its type locality, and Gebe in the Maluku Islands. Its natural habitats are tropical moist lowland forests and slow flowing rivers.
