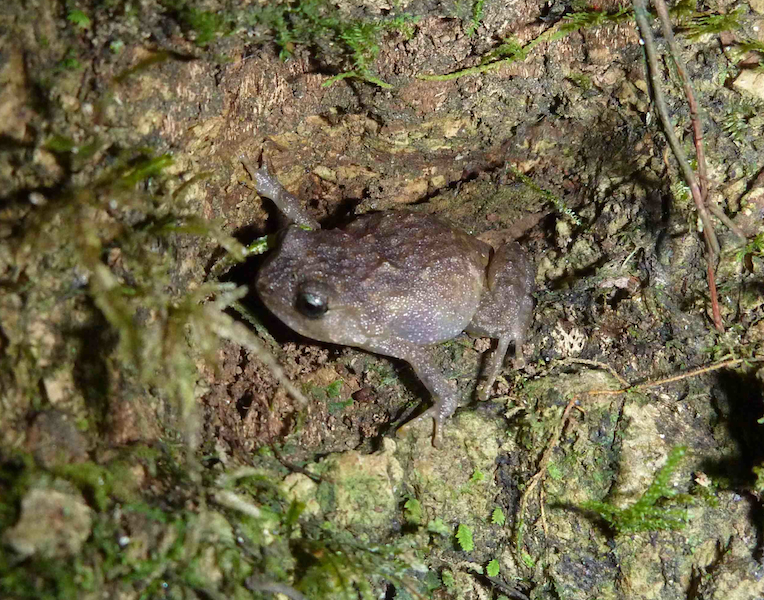

Conservation status
- Endangered (IUCN 3.1)

Scientific classification
- Kingdom: Animalia
- Phylum: Chordata
- Class: Amphibia
- Order: Anura
- Family: Microhylidae
- Genus: Oreophryne
- Species: O. monticola

Binomial name
- Oreophryne monticola (Boulenger, 1897)

= Oreophryne monticola =

Species of frog

Oreophryne monticola is a species of frog in the family Microhylidae. It is endemic to Indonesia. Its natural habitat is subtropical or tropical moist montane forests. It is threatened by habitat loss.
