= Papuahyla lodesdema =

Conservation status
- Least Concern (IUCN 3.1)

Scientific classification
- Kingdom: Animalia
- Phylum: Chordata
- Class: Amphibia
- Order: Anura
- Family: Pelodryadidae
- Genus: Papuahyla
- Species: P. lodesdema

Binomial name
- Papuahyla lodesdema (Menzies, Richards and Tyler, 2008)

Synonyms
- Litoria lodesdema Menzies, Richards and Tyler, 2008

Species of amphibian

Papuahyla lodesdema is a species of frog in the family Pelodryadidae, endemic to New Guinea.

The adult male frog is yellow-green in color and measures about 22 mm in snout-vent length. It has a bronze or yellow stripe. These frogs have some webbing on their front feet and more webbing on their hind feet.

These frogs have been observed laying eggs in a roadside marsh.

The scientists who first described Papuahyla lodesdema named it from the Latin phrase loca demissa septentrionalis domicilium habemus or "in the lowlands of the north we have our home".
