= Oreophryne geislerorum =

Conservation status
- Least Concern (IUCN 3.1)

Scientific classification
- Kingdom: Animalia
- Phylum: Chordata
- Class: Amphibia
- Order: Anura
- Family: Microhylidae
- Genus: Oreophryne
- Species: O. geislerorum

Binomial name
- Oreophryne geislerorum (Boettger, 1892)

Synonyms
- Cophixalus geislerorum Boettger, 1892

Species of frog

Oreophryne geislerorum (also known as the Madang cross frog) is a species of frog in the family Microhylidae. It is endemic to Papua New Guinea where it is known from the northern coast between the tip of the Huon Peninsula and south and east to Kokoda and Popondetta. The specific name geislerorum honours two German taxidermists, Bruno Geisler and his brother Herbert Geisler.

== Description ==
Adult males measure 21–27 mm (0.83–1.06 in) and adult females 24–29 mm (0.94–1.14 in) in snout–vent length. The canthus rostralis is moderately distinct. The tympanum is barely distinct. The fingers and the toes have well-developed terminal disks. The fingers have no webbing whereas the toes have basal webbing. The dorsum is yellowish brown to brown. Darker markings may be present. The ventrum is yellow to grayish white.

The male advertisement call is "harsh" with rapidly repeated notes. Individual notes are not discernible to the human ear. The rate of repetition varies considerably between individuals, about 50–135 notes per second, but is more constant for individual frogs.

== Habitat and conservation ==
Oreophryne geislerorum occurs in rainforests, rural gardens, and urban areas at elevations up to about 1,400 m (4,600 ft) above sea level Active by night, males call from shrubs and trees, sometimes high up. They have been observed to lay eggs inside the stalk of a banana leaf near the main stem. Development is direct, without free-living tadpole stage.

Oreophryne geislerorum is a very common, adaptable species that is not facing any known threats. Its range includes the Kamiali Wildlife Management Area.
