= Oreophryne zimmeri =

Conservation status
- Endangered (IUCN 3.1)

Scientific classification
- Kingdom: Animalia
- Phylum: Chordata
- Class: Amphibia
- Order: Anura
- Family: Microhylidae
- Genus: Oreophryne
- Species: O. zimmeri

Binomial name
- Oreophryne zimmeri Ahl, 1933

Species of frog

Oreophryne zimmeri is a species of frog in the family Microhylidae, although there is doubt whether it really is an Oreophryne. It is endemic to Sulawesi (Indonesia) and known from its type locality in the Mengkoka Mountains, southeastern Sulawesi, and from another record from South Sulawesi. The specific name zimmeri honours Carl Wilhelm Erich Zimmer, a German zoologist. Common name Zimmer's cross frog has been proposed for it.

Oreophryne zimmeri is only known from two specimens. It is presumed to be a burrowing species inhabiting rainforest at elevations of about 2,000 m (6,600 ft) above sea level.
