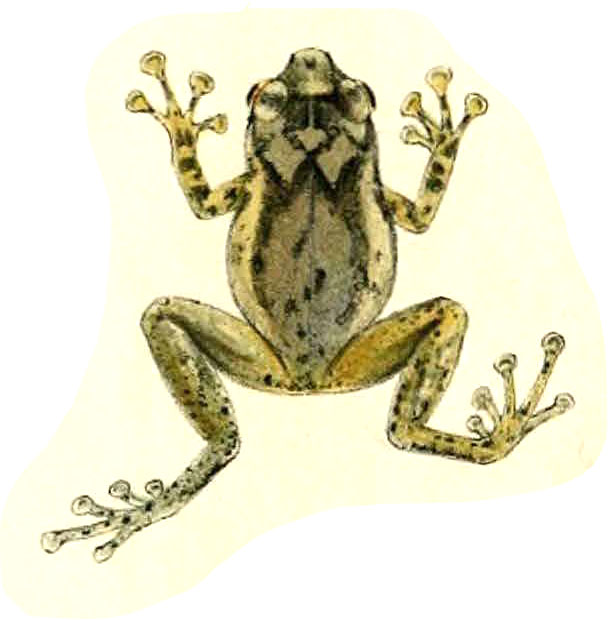

Conservation status
- Vulnerable (IUCN 3.1)

Scientific classification
- Kingdom: Animalia
- Phylum: Chordata
- Class: Amphibia
- Order: Anura
- Family: Microhylidae
- Genus: Oreophryne
- Species: O. celebensis

Binomial name
- Oreophryne celebensis (F. Müller, 1894)

Synonyms
- Sphenophryne celebensis Müller, 1894

= Oreophryne celebensis =

Species of frog

Oreophryne celebensis is a species of frog in the family Microhylidae. It is endemic to northern Sulawesi, Indonesia. Common name Celebes cross frog has been coined for it.

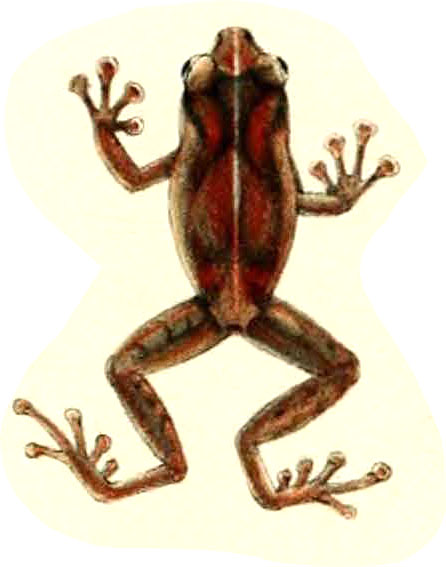
A colour variant of Oreophryne celebensis

== Description ==
Oreophryne celebensis reach 30 mm (1.2 in) in snout–vent length. The snout is rounded and short. The tympanum is at best scarcely visible. The fingers have large discs whereas the toe discs are much smaller. No webbing is present. Skin is smooth or with scattered tubercles dorsally; the belly is smooth or granular. The upper eyelid may bear a tubercle. The dorsal colouration is very variable: uniform yellowish, reddish, pink, or brown, or with darker spots or marblings. There is a triangular dark marking between the eyes, or an X-shaped or hourglass-shaped marking extending to the interscapular region. The canthus rostralis has a dark streak. A light vertebral line may be present. The venter is greyish or brownish, possible mottled with dark brown. No vocal sac is present.

== Habitat and conservation ==
Oreophryne celebensis occurs in montane forests above 1,000 m (3,300 ft). It probably lays terrestrial eggs that develop directly into froglets, without a free-living larval stage.

The distribution area of this species is experiencing serious habitat loss from forest clearance. It probably occurs in the Bogani Nani Wartabone National Park, Tangkoko Batuangus Nature Reserve, and Dua Sudara Nature Reserve. However, heavy habitat loss has also occurred inside the latter two reserves.
