= Oreophryne brevirostris =

Conservation status
- Vulnerable (IUCN 3.1)

Scientific classification
- Kingdom: Animalia
- Phylum: Chordata
- Class: Amphibia
- Order: Anura
- Family: Microhylidae
- Genus: Oreophryne
- Species: O. brevirostris

Binomial name
- Oreophryne brevirostris Zweifel, Cogger & Richards, 2005

Species of frog

Oreophryne brevirostris is a species of frog in the family Microhylidae. It is endemic to West Papua, Indonesia. Its natural habitat is subtropical or tropical high-altitude grassland.
