= Oreophryne pseudasplenicola =

Conservation status
- Data Deficient (IUCN 3.1)

Scientific classification
- Kingdom: Animalia
- Phylum: Chordata
- Class: Amphibia
- Order: Anura
- Family: Microhylidae
- Genus: Oreophryne
- Species: O. pseudasplenicola

Binomial name
- Oreophryne pseudasplenicola Günther, 2003

Species of frog

Oreophryne pseudasplenicola is a species of frog in the family Microhylidae. It is endemic to West Papua, Indonesia. Its natural habitats are subtropical or tropical moist lowland forests and subtropical or tropical moist montane forests.
