= Oreophryne kapisa =

Conservation status
- Least Concern (IUCN 3.1)

Scientific classification
- Kingdom: Animalia
- Phylum: Chordata
- Class: Amphibia
- Order: Anura
- Family: Microhylidae
- Genus: Oreophryne
- Species: O. kapisa

Binomial name
- Oreophryne kapisa Günther, 2003
- Oreophryne kapisa is only known from Biak and Supiori Islands, Indonesia

Species of frog

Oreophryne kapisa is a species of frog in the family Microhylidae. It is endemic to the Indonesian islands Biak and Supiori, northwest of New Guinea. Common name Kapisa's cross frog has been proposed for it.

Oreophryne kapisa occurs in swamps, cultivated areas with fairly dry conditions, and remote tropical forests. Animals have been collected perching in vegetation some 0.5 to 7 m (2 to 23 ft) above the ground. It presumably has direct development (i.e., there is no free-living larval stage), like other Oreophryne.

Oreophryne kapisa is assumed to be a common species within its small range. It also appears to tolerate some habitat modification, and is therefore not considered threatened.
