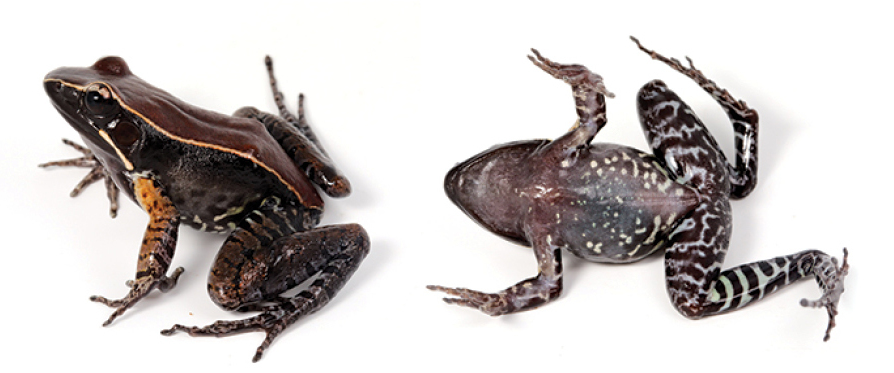

Conservation status
- Least Concern (IUCN 3.1)

Scientific classification
- Kingdom: Animalia
- Phylum: Chordata
- Class: Amphibia
- Order: Anura
- Family: Ranidae
- Genus: Abavorana
- Species: A. luctuosa

Binomial name
- Abavorana luctuosa (Peters, 1871)

Synonyms
- Hylarana luctuosa (Peters, 1871); Limnodytes luctuosus Peters, 1871; Rana decorata Mocquard, 1890; Rana luctuosa (Peters, 1871)

= Abavorana luctuosa =

Species of amphibian

Abavorana luctuosa, also known as the Malaysian frog, mahogany frog or purple frog, is a species of true frog. It is found in the Malay Peninsula (Malaysia and southernmost Thailand) and in Borneo (Indonesia, Malaysia). It was formerly placed in the genus Hylarana.

Abavorana luctuosa is a leaf-litter frog from lowland and submontane primary rainforests, including somewhat disturbed habitats. Adult frogs disperse widely through the forest and breed in rain pools.

It is reddish to chocolate brown, bordered by a narrow cream dorsolateral line on each side, beginning at the tip of the snout to above the vent.
