= Oreophryne furu =

Conservation status
- Least Concern (IUCN 3.1)

Scientific classification
- Kingdom: Animalia
- Phylum: Chordata
- Class: Amphibia
- Order: Anura
- Family: Microhylidae
- Genus: Oreophryne
- Species: O. furu

Binomial name
- Oreophryne furu Günther, Richards, Tjaturadi, and Iskandar, 2009

Species of amphibian

Oreophryne furu is a species of microhylid frogs endemic to the Mamberamo River basin in Papua, Western New Guinea. It is distinguished from other related species by its small size, unique call and egg-guarding behaviour.

Oreophryne furu is only known from near Dabra in the Mamberamo River basin, Western New Guinea

== Discovery ==
O. furu was first collected in 2000 during a Conservation International biodiversity survey, and formally described in 2009 by Rainer Günther, Stephen Richards, Burhan Tjaturadi and Djoko Iskandar. It was found in the lowland rainforest (90 m (300 ft) above sea level) near the Mamberamo River of Western New Guinea. The specific name derives from the Furu River, a small tributary of the Mamberamo River.

== Description and behaviour ==
Length of collected males (from tip of snout to distal tip of urostyle bone) ranged between 20.5 and 23.3 mm, and one female was 24.7 mm. The dorsal and lateral sides are pale grey with variously scattered dark brown pigmentation, and a whitish mask on the snout. The ventral side is whitish and sometimes speckled with dark dots.

A male was observed guarding eggs glued to the underside of a leaf by straddling them, probably to provide moisture and avoid egg desiccation. This behaviour has been observed in only one other (undescribed) Oreophryne species. It advertises for mates with an infrequent, loud, harsh rattle that lasts about two seconds.

== Habitat and conservation ==
Oreophryne furu is known from lowland rainforest adjacent to a river. Calling males were found at night in vegetation 1.5–3 m (5–10 ft) above the ground. The female and the egg-guarding male were on the forest floor. Although only known from a single location, this location is within the Mamberamo Foja Wildlife Reserve, a protected area. Moreover, the location is nested within a large area of undisturbed habitat.
