= Oreophryne moluccensis =

Conservation status
- Least Concern (IUCN 3.1)

Scientific classification
- Kingdom: Animalia
- Phylum: Chordata
- Class: Amphibia
- Order: Anura
- Family: Microhylidae
- Genus: Oreophryne
- Species: O. moluccensis

Binomial name
- Oreophryne moluccensis (Peters & Doria, 1878)

Species of frog

Oreophryne moluccensis is a species of frog in the family Microhylidae. It is endemic to Indonesia. Its natural habitats are subtropical or tropical moist lowland forests.
