= Brown River tree frog =

Conservation status
- Least Concern (IUCN 3.1)

Scientific classification
- Kingdom: Animalia
- Phylum: Chordata
- Class: Amphibia
- Order: Anura
- Family: Pelodryadidae
- Genus: Ischnohyla
- Species: I. vocivincens

Binomial name
- Ischnohyla vocivincens (Menzies, 1972)

Synonyms
- Litoria vocivincens Menzies, 1972

Species of amphibian

The Brown River tree frog (Ischnohyla vocivincens) is a species of frog in the family Pelodryadidae. It is endemic to Papua New Guinea. Its natural habitats are subtropical or tropical moist lowland forests, swamps, intermittent freshwater marshes, and rural gardens.
