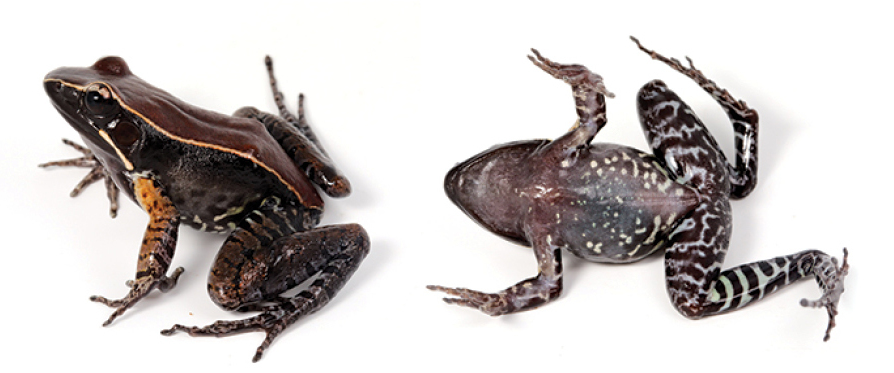
- A. luctuosa

Scientific classification
- Kingdom: Animalia
- Phylum: Chordata
- Class: Amphibia
- Order: Anura
- Family: Ranidae
- Genus: Abavorana; Oliver, Prendini, Kraus, and Raxworthy, 2015

Species
- See text

= Abavorana =

Genus of frogs

Abavorana is a genus of true frogs found in Southeast Asia, namely the Malay Peninsula, Sumatra, and Borneo. Species in this genus were formerly classified in the genus Hylarana, but were reclassified into the new genus Abavorana following a 2015 phylogenetic revision of Hylarana.

== Species ==
There are three species in this genus:

- Abavorana decorata (Moquard, 1890)
- Abavorana luctuosa (Peters, 1871)
- Abavorana nazgul Quah, Anuar, Grismer, Wood, Azizah, and Muin, 2017
