= Viridihyla gasconi =

Conservation status
- Least Concern (IUCN 3.1)

Scientific classification
- Kingdom: Animalia
- Phylum: Chordata
- Class: Amphibia
- Order: Anura
- Family: Pelodryadidae
- Genus: Viridihyla
- Species: V. gasconi

Binomial name
- Viridihyla gasconi (Richards, Oliver, Krey and Tjaturadi, 2009)

Synonyms
- Litoria gasconi Richards, Oliver, Krey and Tjaturadi, 2009

Species of amphibian

Viridihyla gasconi is a species of frog in the family Pelodryadidae. It is endemic to New Guinea.

The adult male frog measures 39.3 to 41.6 mm in snout-vent length. It has large eyes with vertical pupils. It is green in color with yellow spots and parts of its legs and inguinal area are bright orange.
