= Oreophryne minuta =

Conservation status
- Least Concern (IUCN 3.1)

Scientific classification
- Kingdom: Animalia
- Phylum: Chordata
- Class: Amphibia
- Order: Anura
- Family: Microhylidae
- Genus: Oreophryne
- Species: O. minuta

Binomial name
- Oreophryne minuta Richards and Iskandar, 2000

Species of frog

Oreophryne minuta is a species of frog in the family Microhylidae. It is endemic to Papua, Western New Guinea, and only known from its type locality in the Derewo River basin, in the mountains to the southeast of Cenderawasih Bay. It is a very small frog (maximum size 11.5 mm (0.5 in)), and at the time of species description, the smallest Oreophryne species.

== Description ==
Adult males in the type series measure 9.2–11.5 mm (0.4–0.5 in) in snout–vent length; females are unknown. The snout is bluntly pointed in dorsal view and bluntly rounded in lateral profile. The tympanum is indistinct. The fingers and the toes have no webbing. The tips have faint terminal grooves but are not expanded into discs. Skin is smooth. The dorsum has scattered low tubercles forming an hourglass pattern. There are two distinctly larger tubercles on the mid-dorsum behind eyes. Alcohol-preserved specimens are pale brown to brown and have a dark band running from the tip of the snout through the eye, becoming a patchy lateral band.

The male advertisement call consists of a series of distinctly pulsed, rapidly repeated notes lasting about 1–3 seconds and repeat at a rate of 6 s^{−1}. The dominant frequency is about 6900–7500 Hz.

== Habitat and conservation ==
Oreophryne minuta is known from montane tropical rainforest at about 2,000 m (6,600 ft) above sea level. The types were collected from an extremely wet, boulder-filled gully. They were calling at night from within thick clumps of moss that covered the boulders and low tree branches, none higher than 2 m (7 ft) above the ground.

Threats to this species are unknown. It is not known to occur in any protected areas.

Oreophryne minuta is only known from the Derewo River basin, Western New Guinea
