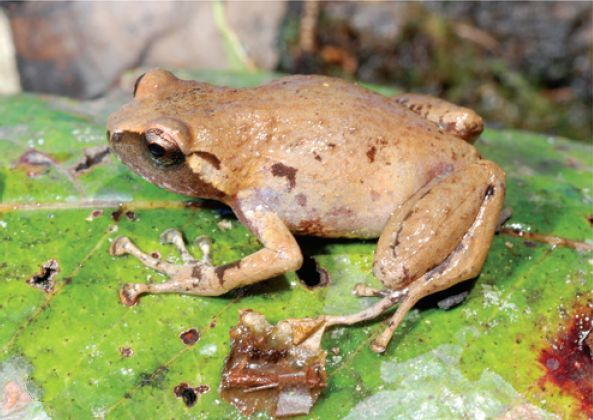
- Oreophryne anamiatoi

Scientific classification
- Domain: Eukaryota
- Kingdom: Animalia
- Phylum: Chordata
- Class: Amphibia
- Order: Anura
- Family: Microhylidae
- Subfamily: Asterophryinae
- Genus: Oreophryne; Boettger, 1895

Type species
- Oreophryne senckenbergiana Boettger, 1895

Species
- See text

Synonyms
- Mehelyia Wandolleck, 1911

= Oreophryne =

Genus of amphibians

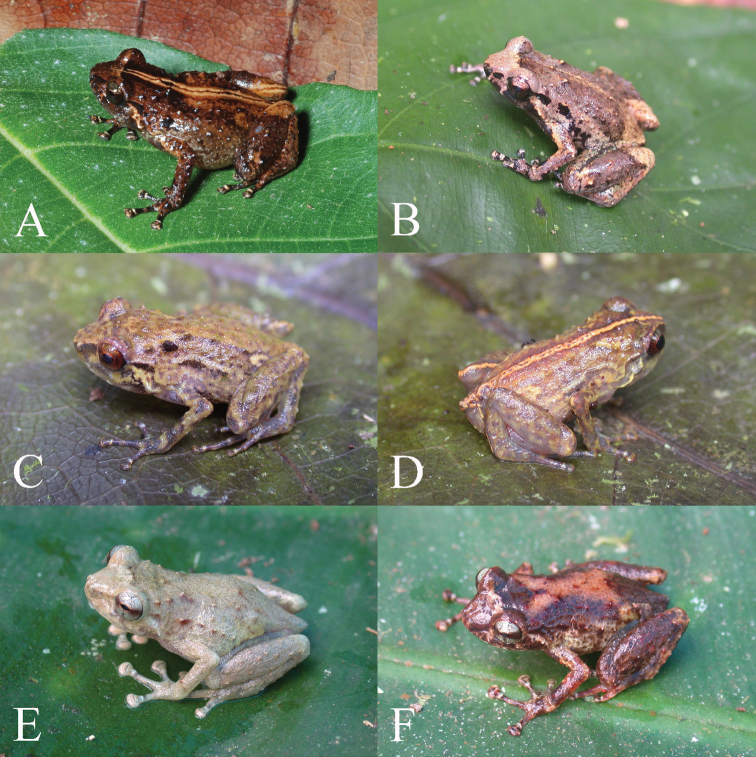
Portraits in life of A paratype of Oreophryne cameroni from Keki Lodge, Adelbert Mts., 850 m elevation; B paratype of Oreophryne cameroni from Torricelli Mts., 550 m elevation; C paratype of Oreophryne parkopanorum from near summit of Mt. Sapau, Torricelli Mts., 1100–1300 m elevation; D holotype of Oreophryne parkopanorum from near summit of Mt. Sapau, Torricelli Mts., 1100–1300 m elevation; E holotype of Oreophryne gagneorum from Rossel Island, 720 m elevation; and F paratype of Oreophryne gagneorum from Rossel Island, 720 m elevation.

Oreophryne, the cross frogs, is a genus of microhylid frogs. They are found in the southern Philippines, Sulawesi and the Lesser Sunda Islands, and New Guinea and New Britain.

== Species ==
Binomial name and author	Common name
Oreophryne albitympanum Günther, Richards, and Tjaturadi, 2018
Oreophryne albomaculata Günther, Richards, and Dahl, 2014	Speckled cross frog
Oreophryne albopunctata (Van Kampen, 1909)	White-dotted cross frog
Oreophryne alticola Zweifel, Cogger & Richards, 2005	Bima cross frog
Oreophryne ampelos Kraus, 2011
Oreophryne anamiatoi Kraus & Allison, 2009
Oreophryne anser Kraus, 2016
Oreophryne anthonyi (Boulenger, 1897)	Anthony's cross frog
Oreophryne anulata (Stejneger, 1908)	Davao cross frog
Oreophryne asplenicola Günther, 2003	Kontiunae cross frog
Oreophryne atrigularis Günther, Richards & Iskandar, 2001	Wondiwoi cross frog
Oreophryne aurora Kraus, 2016
Oreophryne banshee Günther, Richards & Iskandar, 2001Kraus, 2016
Oreophryne biroi (Méhely, 1897)	New Guinea cross frog
Oreophryne brachypus (Werner, 1898)	Gazelle cross frog
Oreophryne brevicrus Zweifel, 1956	Lake Habbema cross frog
Oreophryne brevirostris Zweifel, Cogger & Richards, 2005	Short beaked cross frog
Oreophryne brunnea Kraus, 2017
Oreophryne cameroni Kraus, 2013
Oreophryne celebensis (Müller, 1894)	Celebes cross frog
Oreophryne choerophrynoides Günther, 2015
Oreophryne chlorops (Günther, Iskandar, Richards, 2023)
Oreophryne clamata Günther, 2003	Crying cross frog
Oreophryne crucifer (Van Kampen, 1913)	Common cross frog
Oreophryne curator Günther, Richards, and Dahl, 2014	Minder's cross frog
Oreophryne equus Kraus, 2016
Oreophryne ezra Kraus and Allison, 2009
Oreophryne flava Parker, 1934	Irian Jaya cross frog
Oreophryne flavomaculata Günther and Richards, 2016
Oreophryne frontifasciata (Horst, 1883)	Horst's cross frog
Oreophryne furu Günther, Richards, Tjaturadi, and Iskandar, 2009
Oreophryne gagneorum Kraus, 2013
Oreophryne geislerorum (Boettger, 1892)	Madang cross frog
Oreophryne geminus Zweifel, Cogger, and Richards, 2005	Twin cross frog
Oreophryne graminis Günther and Richards, 2012
Oreophryne habbemensis Zweifel, Cogger & Richards, 2005	Habbema cross frog
Oreophryne hypsiops Zweifel, Menzies & Price, 2003	Sempi cross frog
Oreophryne idenburgensis Zweifel, 1956	Idenburg cross frog
Oreophryne inornata Zweifel, 1956	Dull cross frog
Oreophryne insulana Zweifel, 1956	Goodenough cross frog
Oreophryne jeffersoniana Dunn, 1928	Komodo cross frog
Oreophryne kampeni Parker, 1934	Moroka cross frog
Oreophryne kapisa Günther, 2003	Arwe cross frog
Oreophryne lemur Kraus, 2016
Oreophryne loriae (Boulenger, 1898)	Port Moresby cross frog
Oreophryne matawan Kraus, 2016
Oreophryne meliades Kraus, 2016
Oreophryne mertoni (Roux, 1910)	Merton's cross frog
Oreophryne minuta Richards & Iskandar, 2000	Dwarf cross frog
Oreophryne moluccensis (Peters & Doria, 1878)	Moluccan cross frog
Oreophryne monticola (Boulenger, 1897)	Lombok cross frog
Oreophryne nicolasi Richards and Günther, 2019	Volcano cross frog
Oreophryne notata Zweifel, 2003	Ialibu cross frog
Oreophryne oviprotector Günther, Richards, Bickford, and Johnston, 2012
Oreophryne parkopanorum Kraus, 2013
Oreophryne penelopeia Kraus, 2016
Oreophryne philosylleptoris Kraus, 2016
Oreophryne phoebe Kraus, 2017
Oreophryne picticrus Kraus, 2016
Oreophryne pseudasplenicola Günther, 2003	Amoman cross frog
Oreophryne pseudunicolor Günther and Richards, 2016
Oreophryne roedeli Günther, 2015
Oreophryne rookmaakeri Mertens, 1927	Flores cross frog
Oreophryne sibilans Günther, 2003	Hissing cross frog
Oreophryne streiffeleri Günther and Richards, 2012
Oreophryne terrestris Zweifel, Cogger & Richards, 2005	Terrestrial cross frog
Oreophryne unicolor Günther, 2003	Unicolor cross frog
Oreophryne variabilis (Boulenger, 1896)	Variable cross frog
Oreophryne waira Günther, 2003	Waira cross frog
Oreophryne wapoga Günther, Richards & Iskandar, 2001	Wapoga cross frog
Oreophryne wolterstorffi (Werner, 1901)	Wolterstorff's cross frog
Oreophryne zimmeri Ahl, 1933	Zimmer's cross frog
