= Oreophryne atrigularis =

Conservation status
- Data Deficient (IUCN 3.1)

Scientific classification
- Kingdom: Animalia
- Phylum: Chordata
- Class: Amphibia
- Order: Anura
- Family: Microhylidae
- Genus: Oreophryne
- Species: O. atrigularis

Binomial name
- Oreophryne atrigularis Günther, Richards, and Iskandar, 2001

Species of frog

Oreophryne atrigularis is a species of frog in the family Microhylidae. It is endemic to Western New Guinea (Indonesia) and known from its type locality, the Wondiwoi Mountains at the base of the Wandammen Peninsula, and from another location further east between Nabire and Mapia.

== Description ==
Adult males measure 20–22.5 mm (0.8–0.9 in) in snout–vent length. An adult female measures 26 mm (1.0 in), whereas a female measuring 22 mm appears to be a sub-adult. The head is broader than it is long; the snout is tapering and projecting. The tympanum is covered by skin and barely visible. The fingers and toes have discs with circummarginal grooves. The colouration is dorsally beige (sometimes greyish-brown) with some spots and marbling. About one half of animals have a conspicuous whitish mid-dorsal line that has blackish borders, and similarly many have a W-shaped mark in the scapular area, surrounding two whitish spots. The throat is black (hence the specific name atrigularis, from Latin ater for "black" and gularis for "belonging to throat") grading posteriorly into dark brown or dark grey marbling; the female and one male have pale grey throat. Males have a single internal subgular vocal sac.

== Habitat and conservation ==
Oreophryne atrigularis is known from both dense and open tropical rainforest at elevations of 350–750 m (1,150–2,460 ft) above sea level. It lives in low vegetation, up to 2 m (7 ft) above the ground. Development is presumably direct (i.e., no free-living tadpole stage).

Some selective logging is taking place in the range of this species, but probably not to an extent that would pose a serious threat. Oreophryne atrigularis in the Wandamen Nature Reserve, but this is not securing it from logging. It was abundant at its type locality.
