= Oreophryne biroi =

Conservation status
- Least Concern (IUCN 3.1)

Scientific classification
- Kingdom: Animalia
- Phylum: Chordata
- Class: Amphibia
- Order: Anura
- Family: Microhylidae
- Genus: Oreophryne
- Species: O. biroi

Binomial name
- Oreophryne biroi (Méhely, 1897)

Synonyms
- Sphenophryne biroi Méhely, 1897; Mehelyia lineata Wandolleck, 1911 "1910"; Mehelyia affinis Wandolleck, 1911 "1910"; Phrynomantis biroi (Méhely, 1897)

Species of frog

Oreophryne biroi is a species of frog in the family Microhylidae.

== Distribution ==
It is endemic to New Guinea and occurs on the north coast from Madang Province in Papua New Guinea to the Cyclops Mountains in Papua province, Western New Guinea (Indonesia).

== Etymology ==
The specific name biroi honours Lajos Bíró, a Hungarian zoologist and ethnographer who collected the holotype. Common name New Guinea cross frog has been coined for it.

== Description ==
Adult males measure 22–24 mm (0.87–0.94 in) and adult females 27–29 mm (1.06–1.14 in) in snout–vent length. The head is somewhat narrower than the body. The canthus rostralis is distinct but rounded. The tympanum is small. The fingers and the toes have broad terminal disks and some webbing. The dorsum is fawn; the area from the top of the snout to the mid-ocular region is conspicuously paler. A thin mid-dorsal stripe may be present. The hidden surfaces of the thighs are orange. The venter is pale with glistening white blotches. The iris is red-gold.

== Habitat and conservation ==
Oreophryne biroi occurs in lowland rainforests and degraded forest to elevations of about 1,000 m (3,300 ft) above sea level. Development is direct, without free-living tadpole stage. It is not a common species. Threats to it are unknown. It probably occurs in the Cyclops Mountains Nature Reserve.
