= Pieter Nicolaas van Kampen =

Dutch herpetologist (1878–1937)

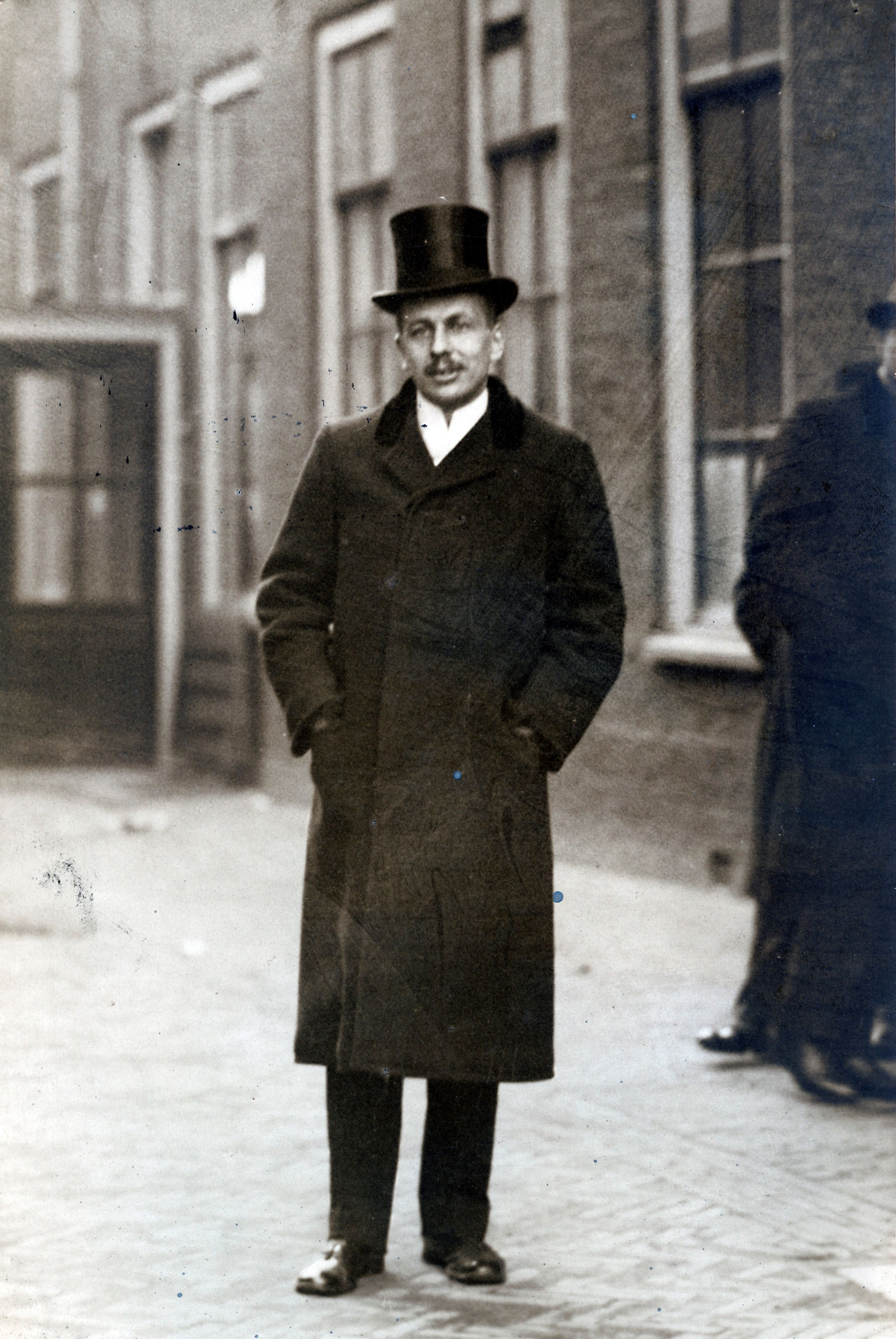
P.N. van Kampen (1917)

Pieter Nicolaas van Kampen (30 June 1878, Amsterdam – 3 July 1937, Leiden) was a Dutch zoologist.

In 1904 he received his PhD from the University of Amsterdam, where he was a student and assistant to Max Carl Wilhelm Weber. From 1905 to 1911 he was based in the Dutch East Indies, during which time, he was assigned to the Aru Islands (1907) and participated in an expedition to Netherlands New Guinea (1910). In 1911 he returned to Amsterdam as a zoological assistant at the university. From 1917 to 1931 he served as a professor at the University of Leiden.

== Taxa ==
He is the taxonomic author of the frog genera Choerophryne, Nesobia (junior homonym), and Oxydactyla, as well as of numerous amphibian species. With Hilbrand Boschma, he described a number of species within the barnacle genus Sacculina. His name is associated with the following species:

- Hylarana kampeni (Bander Baru frog); circumscribed by George Albert Boulenger, 1920.
- Nactus vankampeni (Van Kampen's gecko); circumscribed by Leo Brongersma, 1933.
- Oreophryne kampeni (Moroka Cross frog); circumscribed by Hampton Wildman Parker, 1924.

== Selected writings ==
- De tympanaalstreek van den zoogdierschedel, 1904.
- De hulpmiddelen der zeevisscherij, op Java en Madoera in gebruik, 1909.
- Visscherij en vischteelt in Nederlandsch-Indië, 1922 – Fishery, and fish cultivation in the Netherlands Indies.
- "The amphibia of the Indo-Australian archipelago", published in English in 1923.
- Die rhizocephalen der Siboga-expedition, 1925 (with Hilbrandt Boschma) – Rhizocephala of the Siboga Expedition.
