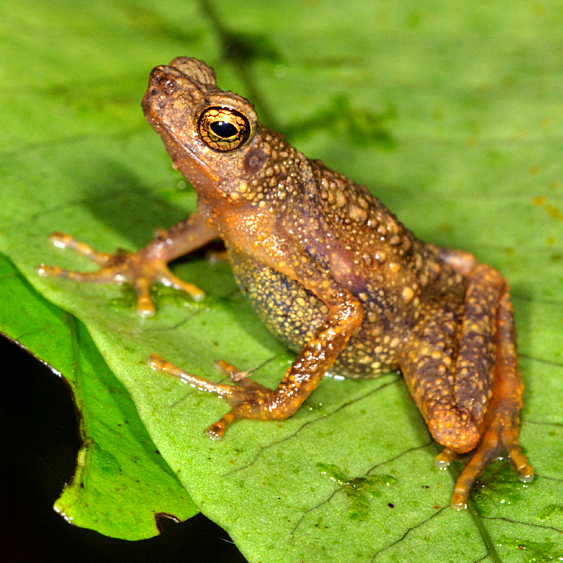
- An adult, possibly a male, Sarawak, Malaysia

Conservation status
- Least Concern (IUCN 3.1)

Scientific classification
- Kingdom: Animalia
- Phylum: Chordata
- Class: Amphibia
- Order: Anura
- Family: Bufonidae
- Genus: Ansonia
- Species: A. minuta

Binomial name
- Ansonia minuta Inger, 1960

= Ansonia minuta =

Species of amphibian

Ansonia minuta is a species of toad in the family Bufonidae, described from the forests of Sarawak in 1960. It is known by a number of common names: tiny stream toad, dwarf slender toad, and minute slender toad. It is endemic to Borneo (both Indonesia and Malaysia) and occurs in tropical moist lowland forests. It is threatened by habitat loss.

== Systematics ==
Recent phylogenetic studies found that A. minuta forms a sister relationship with another as yet undescribed member of Ansonia, and is positioned in a clade consisting of Ansonia hanitschi, Ansonia spinulifer, Ansonia platysoma, and the undescribed species.

== Description ==
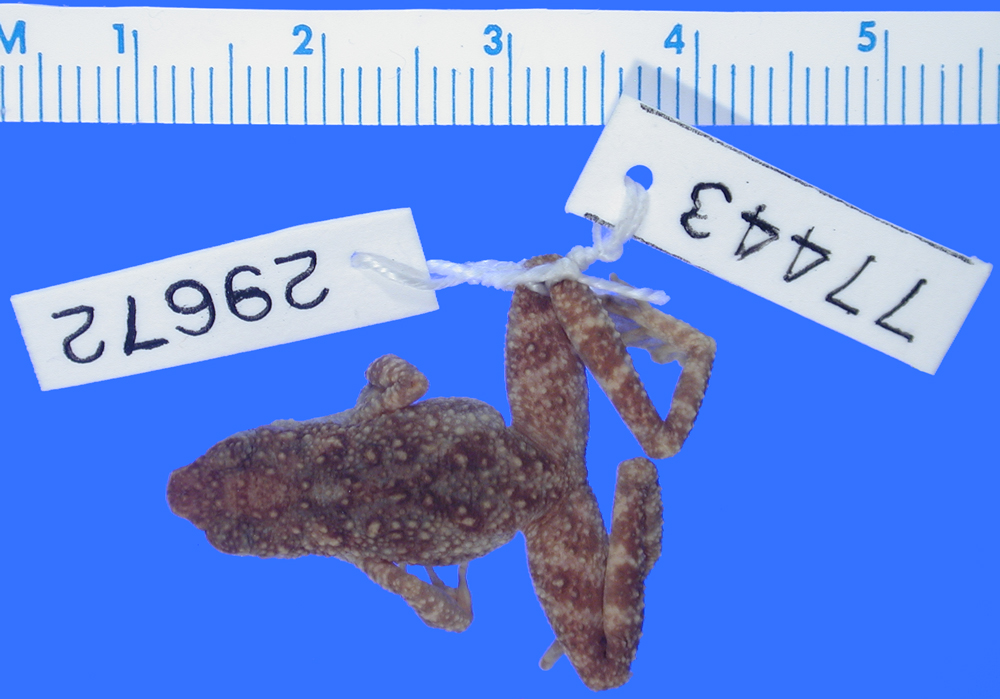
Dorsal view of Ansonia minuta from the Museum of Comparative Zoology

A. minuta is a smaller member of the genus Ansonia. Males range up between 20–24 mm (0.79–0.94 in) while the females measure up to 30 mm (1.2 in) in snout–vent length. The species is slender, with a wide truncate snout. Ear tympani are visible; the feet have rudimentary webbing. The skin on the back is tuberculate with rounded warts, while flanks and throat are more finely granulated. The male possesses a vocal sac with a longitudinal slit on the left side of the mouth. Larvae are recorded to grow up to 17.2 mm (0.68 in).

== Distribution and habitat ==
The species is endemic to Borneo and known from western and central Sarawak and Sabah in Malaysia and adjacent western Kalimantan (Indonesia) between elevations of 200–1,000 m (660–3,280 ft) above sea level. It has a terrestrial lifestyle and occurs in the lowland rainforests, where it breeds in small, rocky streams with clear flowing water. Larvae develop within streams.

== Conservation ==
A. minuta is currently listed as Near Threatened by the IUCN, as it is believed to suffer from habitat loss through logging and the species will not inhabit disturbed habitats.
