= Pulchrana fantastica =

Scientific classification
- Kingdom: Animalia
- Phylum: Chordata
- Class: Amphibia
- Order: Anura
- Family: Ranidae
- Genus: Pulchrana
- Species: P. fantastica

Binomial name
- Pulchrana fantastica Arifin, Cahyadi, Smart, Jankowski, and Haas, 2018

Synonyms
- Hylarana fantastica — Dubois, Ohler, and Pyron, 2021

Species of true frog

Pulchrana fantastica, also known as the splendid stream frog, is a species of "true frog", family Ranidae. It is endemic to northern Sumatra (Indonesia) and is currently known from the Aceh and North Sumatra provinces. Its nearest relatives are Pulchrana centropeninsularis and Pulchrana siberu. The specific name fantastica is derived from the Greek phantastikós and refers to the "extraordinary beauty" of this frog.

== Description ==
Adult males measure 40–45 mm (1.6–1.8 in) in snout–vent length; females are unknown. The body is slender. The snout is obtusely pointed in dorsal view and slightly protruding in lateral view. The tympanum is visible and the supratympanic fold is distinct. The fingers are long and slender and lack webbing, but have tips slightly enlarged into rounded discs. The toes are webbed and have tips enlarged into discs. The dorsum ranges from finely granulated to granular. The dorsal coloration is black. There usually is a middorsal marking consisting of an orange, discontinuous line of variable length, possibly in combination with spots; this marking is lacking in all juveniles. There is a pair of continuous orange dorsolateral lines running from the tip of the snout over canthus rostralis to sacrum, eventually breaking into spots at the posterior pelvic region. The flanks are brown and have yellow spots. The venter is greyish-brown. The dorsal surfaces of the limbs are brown with yellow to orange round or elongated, sometimes connected spots.

Males have paired internal subgular vocal sacs.

== Habitat ==
Pulchrana fantastica occurs in primary forest at elevations between 450 and 1,065 m (1,476 and 3,494 ft) above sea level. The lowland records come from a typical dipterocarp forest. Specimens have been found on the forest-floor leaf litter and various perches (low vegetation, dead logs, roots, and rocks) near small to medium-sized streams, and even on a dead branch in a stream.

== Conservation ==
As of November 2021, this species has not been included in the IUCN Red List of Threatened Species. Arifin and colleagues consider the ongoing loss of primary forest a major threat to Pulchrana fantastica. All populations sampled in Aceh come from protected areas, including the Mount Leuser National Park.
