= Stream frog (disambiguation) =

The stream frog is a genus of pyxicephalid frogs native to Africa.

Stream frog may also refer to:

- Beautiful stream frog, a frog found in India, Bangladesh, and Nepal
- Chantaburi stream frog, a frog native to Thailand and Vietnam
- Dehradun stream frog, a frog found in India
- Greek stream frog, a frog found in Albania, Bosnia and Herzegovina, Bulgaria, Greece, Macedonia, Serbia and Montenegro, and possibly Turkey
- Italian stream frog, a frog found in Italy and San Marino
- Jaunsar stream frog, a frog found in Chakrata, Uttarakhand, India
- Leyte slender stream frog, a frog endemic to the Philippines
- Mountain stream frog, a frog found in Central America
- Palebrown stream frog, a frog found in India, Bangladesh, Myanmar, Thailand, and possibly Bhutan and Nepal
- Red stream frog, a frog found in Myanmar, Thailand, Malaysia, and India
- Red-eyed stream frog, a frog found in Costa Rica and Panama
- Sapgreen stream frog, a frog found in Cambodia, China, India, Indonesia, Laos, Malaysia, Myanmar, Thailand, Vietnam, and possibly Bangladesh
- Stream brown frog, a frog endemic to Japan
- Strong stream frog, a frog endemic to Taiwan
- Trinidadian stream frog, a frog endemic to Trinidad

== See also ==
- Spotted stream frog (disambiguation)
- Stream tree frog (disambiguation)
- Striped stream frog (disambiguation)
