= Spotted frog =

Spotted frog may also refer to:

- Columbia spotted frog, a frog found in North America
- Oregon spotted frog, a frog endemic to the Pacific Northwest
- Spotted chorus frog, a frog native to the United States and Mexico
- Spotted grass frog, a frog native to Australia
- Spotted paa frog, a frog endemic to Yunnan, China
- Spotted rubber frog, a frog found in several countries of Africa
- Spotted stream frog (disambiguation)
  - Pulchrana picturata, a frog that is endemic to Southeast Asia
  - Hylarana signata, a frog that is endemic to Southeast Asia
- Western spotted frog, a frog endemic to Western Australia
