= Ansonia penangensis =

Conservation status
- Least Concern (IUCN 3.1)

Scientific classification
- Kingdom: Animalia
- Phylum: Chordata
- Class: Amphibia
- Order: Anura
- Family: Bufonidae
- Genus: Ansonia
- Species: A. penangensis

Binomial name
- Ansonia penangensis Stoliczka, 1870

Synonyms
- Bufo penangensis (Stoliczka, 1870)

Species of amphibian

Ansonia penangensis is a species of toad in the family Bufonidae. It is endemic to Penang Island, Malaysia. Records from elsewhere represent other species; the mainland records are referable to Ansonia malayana and Ansonia jeetsukumarani.

Its natural habitats are rocky streams in rainforests.

The species has a rough dark grey coloration with orange spots gathered around limbs.
