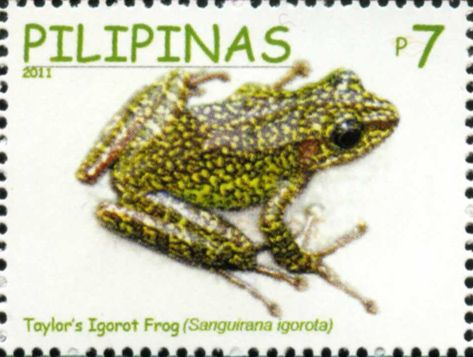

Conservation status
- Vulnerable (IUCN 3.1)

Scientific classification
- Kingdom: Animalia
- Phylum: Chordata
- Class: Amphibia
- Order: Anura
- Family: Ranidae
- Genus: Sanguirana
- Species: S. igorota

Binomial name
- Sanguirana igorota (Taylor, 1922)

Synonyms
- Rana igorota Taylor, 1922; Hydrophylax igorota (Taylor, 1922); Chalcorana igorota (Taylor, 1922); Hylarana igorota (Taylor, 1922)

= Sanguirana igorota =

Species of amphibian

Sanguirana igorota is a species of true frog, family Ranidae. It is endemic to Cordillera Central of the island of Luzon, Philippines. Its closest relative is Sanguirana luzonensis, and it has even been considered synonym of that species; a later study suggests still unresolved relationships between S. igorota, S. luzonensis, and S. tipanan. Common name Taylor's Igorot frog has been coined for this species.

== Description ==
Adult males measure 50–58 mm (2.0–2.3 in) and adult females 68–82 mm (2.7–3.2 in) in snout–vent length. The snout is squarish in dorsal view. The tympanum can be translucent. Moderate dorsolateral ridges are present. The dorsum is olive green with bronze spots. The venter is yellow. Fine dorsal asperities are present. The groin is tuberculate. No vocal sac is present in males.

== Habitat and conservation ==
Sanguirana igorota occurs in cool streams and rivers in montane rainforest at elevations of 850–950 m (2,790–3,120 ft) above sea level (800–1,300 m (2,600–4,300 ft) in other sources). It can be fairly abundant in suitable habitat and tolerates some habitat disturbance. Presumably, breeding takes place in streams; the eggs are laid in water. It is threatened by habitat loss (deforestation) caused by habitat conversion to agriculture or real estate.
