= Spotted stream frog =

Spotted stream frog may refer to:

- Pulchrana picturata
- Hylarana signata

== See also ==
- Sylvirana nigrovittata, the black-striped frog
- Spotted frog (disambiguation)
- Stream frog (disambiguation)
