= Ansonia pilokensis =

Scientific classification
- Kingdom: Animalia
- Phylum: Chordata
- Class: Amphibia
- Order: Anura
- Family: Bufonidae
- Genus: Ansonia
- Species: A. pilokensis

Binomial name
- Ansonia pilokensis Matsui, Khonsue, and Panha, 2018
- Ansonia pilokensis is only known from Thong Pha Phum National Park, Thailand

Species of toad

Ansonia pilokensis, also known as the Pilok stream toad, is a species of toad in the family Bufonidae. As currently known, it is endemic to Kanchanaburi Province in western Thailand, on the eastern slopes of the Bilauktaung Range. Its true range possibly extends into adjacent Myanmar. Geographically, its range is close to Ansonia thinthinae from the western (i.e., Burmese) slopes of the Bilauktaung Range, but A. thinthinae is more closely related to the geographically more distant Ansonia kraensis than to A. pilokensis.

== Etymology ==
The specific name pilokensis refers to its type locality, Pilok Subdistrict.

== Description ==
Adult males measure 20–24 mm (0.8–0.9 in) and adult females, based on two specimens, about 25 mm (1.0 in) in snout–vent length. The head is longer than it is wide. The snout is truncate in dorsal view and projecting, obliquely sloping in profile. The tympanum is distinct. The fingers have weakly developed basal webbing. The finger and toe tips are slightly swollen into weakly developed discs. The toes are heavily webbed. The dorsum is dark brown with an indistinct light brown interocular bar, a light yellow interscapular spot, and very thin middorsal stripe. The lips are barred with cream. Most individuals have light yellow markings running from beneath the eye along the flank to the groin. Ventral surfaces are bright yellow with dark-brown markings. The ventral surfaces of hands and feet are reddish, mottled with dark brown. The iris is golden with black reticulations. Males have a subgular vocal sac.

== Distribution and habitat ==
Ansonia pilokensis is only known from its type locality, Pilok Subdistrict in the Thong Pha Phum National Park, at 942 m (3,091 ft) above sea level. At the type locality, Ansonia pilokensis were primarily found on banks along small mountain streams at night. However, one specimen was found during the day in leaf litter along a path five meters from a stream.

== Conservation ==
The known range of Ansonia pilokensis is inside a national park. As of late 2022, it has not been assessed for the IUCN Red List.
