= Striped frog =

Striped frog may refer to:

- Striped burrowing frog (Cyclorana alboguttata), a frog in the family Hylidae found in Australia
- Striped chorus frog (Pseudacris triseriata), a frog in the family Hylidae found in Canada and the United States
- Striped marsh frog (Limnodynastes peronii), a frog in the family Myobatrachidae native to eastern Australia
- Striped metal frog (Cacosternum striatum), a frog in the family Pyxicephalidae found in Lesotho and South Africa, and possibly Mozambique and Eswatini
- Striped robber frog (Eleutherodactylus unistrigatus), a frog in the family Leptodactylidae found in Colombia and Ecuador
- Striped rocket frog (Litoria nasuta), a frog in the family Hylidae found in Australia and Papua New Guinea
- Striped tree frog (Hypsiboas caingua), a frog in the family Hylidae found in Argentina, Brazil, and Paraguay
- Striped tree frog (Asia) (Polypedates leucomystax), a frog in the family Rhacophoridae found in Asia

== See also ==
- Striped stream frog (disambiguation)
