= Ansonia vidua =

Scientific classification
- Kingdom: Animalia
- Phylum: Chordata
- Class: Amphibia
- Order: Anura
- Family: Bufonidae
- Genus: Ansonia
- Species: A. vidua

Binomial name
- Ansonia vidua Hertwig, Min, Haas, and Das, 2014

Species of amphibian

Ansonia vidua is a species of toads in the family Bufonidae. It is endemic to Sarawak, Borneo. Common names Murud black slender toad and widow slender toad have been coined for this little known species. The latter name refers to the black colouration of this species and the fact that no male individuals are known.

== Etymology ==
The specific name vidua is Latin for "widow" and refers to the uniform brownish-black colouration of this species, much like what widows have traditionally chosen. It also refers to the fact that males of this species are unknown.

== Distribution ==
Ansonia echinata is endemic to Malaysian Borneo where it is only known from its type locality, Gunung Murud (=Mount Murud) in the Pulong Tau National Park, Sarawak.

Ansonia echinata is only known from Gunung Murud in Sarawak, Borneo.

== Description ==
The type series consists of two adult females that measured 33.5 and 34.3 mm (1.32 and 1.35 in) in snout–vent length. No other specimens are known.

The habitus is slender. The colouration is uniformly black-brown above; the limbs are dark brown with lighter areas on joints of the limbs and phalanges. The iris is black with small, intense red spots. The dorsum, flanks, and upper surfaces of the limbs are covered with many small, low, rounded warts that give the skin a velvet-like appearance. The warts on the dorsum, head, and limbs terminate in a single fine, keratinous spine. The tympanum is distinct and slightly greater than half eye in diameter. There are two low, longitudinal interorbital ridges. The canthus rostralis is slightly swollen. The webbing between the toes is reduced. The fingers and toes are long.

Male Ansonia vidua are unknown. Hertwig and colleagues discuss the possibility that Ansonia echinata, known only from male specimens (and one unsexed juvenile), could be conspecific with Ansonia vidua. Based on morphological and ecological differences, they conclude that the two are separate species, although lack of tissue samples from A. echinata means that this question could not be settled with molecular methods. Also the tadpoles are unknown.

== Habitat and ecology ==
Both known specimens were found at night, just below the summit ridge of the Gunung Murud massif at 2,152 m (7,060 ft) above sea level. They were resting on the leaves of lower vegetation a few meters from a small stream in undisturbed, mossy montane forest. Other aspects of its ecology are unknown.
