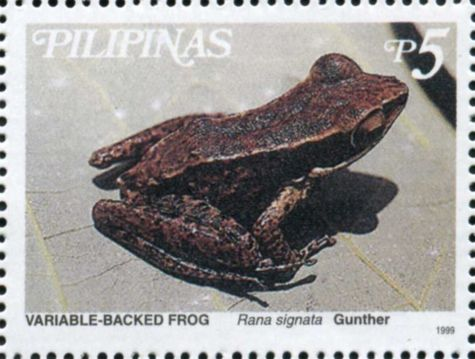
- Prior to its description in 2002, Pulchrana mangyanum was confused with P. signata, a species now considered to be endemic to Sumatra. This 1999 stamp likely represents P. mangyanum or some other Philippine Pulchrana, but not P. signata.

Conservation status
- Vulnerable (IUCN 3.1)

Scientific classification
- Kingdom: Animalia
- Phylum: Chordata
- Class: Amphibia
- Order: Anura
- Family: Ranidae
- Genus: Pulchrana
- Species: P. mangyanum

Binomial name
- Pulchrana mangyanum (Brown and Guttman, 2002)

Synonyms
- Rana mangyanum Brown and Guttman, 2002; Hylarana mangyanum (Brown and Guttman, 2002)

= Pulchrana mangyanum =

Species of amphibian

Pulchrana mangyanum is a species of "true frog", family Ranidae. It is endemic to the Philippines and occurs on Mindoro, Sibay, and Semirara islands. Prior to its description in 2002, Pulchrana mangyanum was confused with Pulchrana signata.

== Etymology ==
The specific name mangyanum refers to the Mangyan, indigenous people of Mindoro.

== Description ==
Adult males measure 34–59 mm (1.3–2.3 in) and adult females 48–69 mm (1.9–2.7 in) in snout–vent length. the snout is obtusely rounded and moderately elongate. The eyes are large and protuberant. The tympanum is distinct. The fingers have moderately large discs but no webbing. The toes are long and bear discs that are larger than those on the fingers; webbing is present. Coloration is highly variable. Middorsal surfaces, head and rostrum range from being nearly homogeneous black or very dark brown to having golden yellow or brown diffuse central blotches. Dorsolateral lines vary in thickness (1.2–3.8 mm (0.05–0.15 in), generally thicker in females than in males), shape (sometimes nearly straight, but typically irregular), and color (solid grey, tan, or golden yellow, or with small round brown spots).

== Habitat and conservation ==
Pulchrana mangyanum inhabits and breeds in undisturbed and disturbed streams and rivers in lower montane and lowland forests at elevations below 700 m (2,300 ft). Males call perched on rocks or ledges, or concealed within grassy edges of banks, always within a half a meter of the stream's edge. The tadpoles develop in quiet side-pools in rivers.

Though occurring in disturbed areas, it does not tolerate much habitat disturbance and is considered threatened by shifting, slash-and-burn agriculture and small-scale wood collection by local settlements. However, it can still be locally common. It is present in some protected areas on Mindoro.
