= Ansonia echinata =

Scientific classification
- Kingdom: Animalia
- Phylum: Chordata
- Class: Amphibia
- Order: Anura
- Family: Bufonidae
- Genus: Ansonia
- Species: A. echinata

Binomial name
- Ansonia echinata Inger and Stuebing, 2009

Species of amphibian

Ansonia echinata is a species of toads in the family Bufonidae. It is endemic to Sarawak, Borneo. Common name spiny slender toad has been coined for this little known species.

== Etymology ==
The specific name echinata is derived from Latin echinatus, meaning "thorny", and refers to the spinose tubercles on top of the snout and on the sides.

== Distribution ==
Ansonia echinata is endemic to Malaysian Borneo where it is only known from its type locality, Bukit Kana, a small and isolated hill in Bintulu Division, Sarawak.

Ansonia echinata is only known from Bukit Kana in Sarawak, Borneo.

== Description ==
The type series consists of four adult males that measured 20–21.3 mm (0.79–0.84 in) in snout–vent length; this means that Ansonia echinata is a relatively small species among the Bornean Ansonia. The habitus is stocky. The canthus is sharp. The tympanum is visible and slightly greater than half eye in diameter. The dorsal surfaces are covered with tubercles. The snout, sides, and limbs bear tubercles with small black spines (the ones that have given the species its name). The toes are partially to fully webbed. The finger and toe tips are rounded but not expanded. The colour in life is unknown; in preservative, the dorsum is dark brown and the raised tubercles are yellowish brown. Ventral colouration is light yellowish brown without pattern. The limbs have dark crossbars.

Males have subgular vocal sacs with a slit-like opening in the floor of the mouth. Female Ansonia echinata are unknown. Hertwig and colleagues discuss the possibility that Ansonia vidua, known only from two female specimens, could be conspecific with Ansonia echinata. Based on morphological and ecological differences, they conclude that the two are separate species, although lack of tissue samples from A. echinata means that this question could not be settled with molecular methods.

Three kinds of Ansonia tadpoles were collected at the type locality. One of them belongs to Ansonia longidigita, whereas the other two could not be assigned to species. Because tissue samples were not available, it was not possible to ascertain which one of them, if any, belongs to Ansonia echinata. Maximum recorded total lengths of these two tadpole types tadpoles were 6.9 and 9.4 mm (0.27 and 0.37 in).

== Habitat and ecology ==
The type series was collected near a small stream (3 metre in width) in primary rain forest at about 250 m (820 ft) above sea level. All of them were perched on leaves up to 1 metre above ground. In addition, a juvenile was found in the stream itself. Otherwise, the natural history of this species is unknown.
