= Ansonia phuketensis =

Conservation status
- Endangered (IUCN 3.1)

Scientific classification
- Kingdom: Animalia
- Phylum: Chordata
- Class: Amphibia
- Order: Anura
- Family: Bufonidae
- Genus: Ansonia
- Species: A. phuketensis

Binomial name
- Ansonia phuketensis Matsui, Khonsue, and Panha, 2018
- Ansonia phuketensis is only known from Phuket Island, Thailand.

Species of toad

Ansonia phuketensis, also known as the Phuket stream toad, is a species of toad in the family Bufonidae. It is endemic to the island of Phuket, off the south-west coast of Thailand.

== Description ==
Adult males measure 23–25 mm (0.9–1.0 in) and adult females, based on two specimens, 28–31 mm (1.1–1.2 in) in snout–vent length. The head is longer than it is wide. The snout is truncate in dorsal view and projecting, obliquely sloping in profile. The tympanum is distinct. The fingers are slender and bear weak dermal fringes. The finger tips are slightly swollen into weakly spatulate discs. The toes are moderately webbed and have tips swollen into small discs. The dorsum is brown with darker markings, often forming a reticulate pattern. The lore and lips are barred with orange-yellow. There are light yellow spots forming a row that runs from beneath the eye through the flank to the groin. The ventral surfaces and gular region are light yellow, mottled with dark brown. The iris is golden with black reticulations.

The male advertisement call consists of a series of 2–5 distinct notes, each lasting 18–38 ms, for a total duration of 0.08–0.35 seconds. The dominant frequency is 7310–7710 Hz.

== Distribution and habitat ==
Ansonia phuketensis is only known from its type locality, Kathu waterfall, on Phuket Island, at 82 m (269 ft) above sea level. Although suitable habitat exists elsewhere on the island and on the mainland, it is likely that the true range of this species is restricted; its current estimated extent of occurrence (EOO) is only 5 km^{2}.

At the type locality, Ansonia phuketensis occur near waterfalls in mountain streams no more than 5 meters wide on rocks and shrubs 1–2 meters above the ground. They are nocturnal. It is not known whether other types of stream habitats are suitable. It presumably breeds in streams, like other Ansonia.

== Conservation ==
Ansonia phuketensis is listed as "endangered" because it is only known from a single locality and habitat deterioration is occurring in the area. Forests are fragmented by palm plantations, and urban development is also a threat. There are no protected areas within the likely range of this species.
