= Ansonia tiomanica =

Conservation status
- Least Concern (IUCN 3.1)

Scientific classification
- Kingdom: Animalia
- Phylum: Chordata
- Class: Amphibia
- Order: Anura
- Family: Bufonidae
- Genus: Ansonia
- Species: A. tiomanica

Binomial name
- Ansonia tiomanica Hendrickson, 1966

Species of amphibian

Ansonia tiomanica (common names: Pulau Tioman slender toad, Pulo Tioman stream toad) is a species of toad in the family Bufonidae. It is endemic to Tioman Island (=Pulau Tioman), off the east coast of Peninsular Malaysia.

Tioman Island, the only place where Ansonia tiomanica occurs.

== Description ==
Males measure 27–31 mm (1.1–1.2 in) and females 32–37 mm (1.3–1.5 in) in snout–vent length. The tympanum is distinct. The dorsum has rough skin and is black in colour, covered with small, yellow spots; juveniles may have orange spots. The chest and belly are black. The fingers and toes are long and thin and have bulbous tips.

The colouration might be aposematic as the skin contains toxins that can kill other frogs.

== Habitat and conservation ==
The species' natural habitats are primary montane forests. At lower elevations (around 200 m), it is generally associated with boulder habitats along fast-flowing streams. At higher elevations (>800 m), the species is restricted to cave-like microhabitats formed by large granite boulders. These frogs are active at night and most often found perched on vertical surfaces of rocks, rarely on leaves.

It can in future be threatened by habitat loss caused by clearance for tourism infrastructure, and is classified as least concern by the IUCN Red List of Threatened Species.
