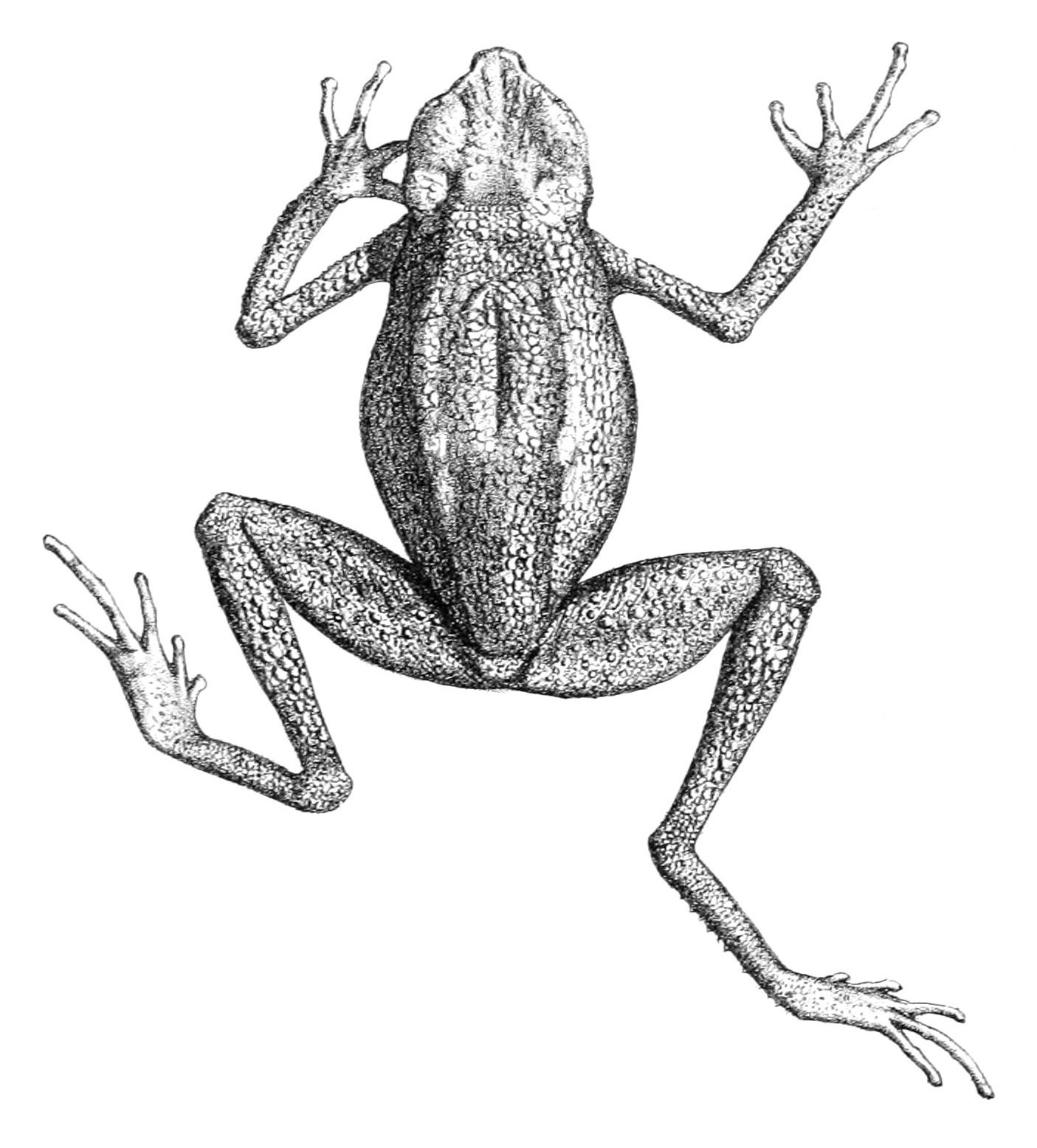

Conservation status
- Least Concern (IUCN 3.1)

Scientific classification
- Kingdom: Animalia
- Phylum: Chordata
- Class: Amphibia
- Order: Anura
- Family: Bufonidae
- Genus: Ansonia
- Species: A. leptopus

Binomial name
- Ansonia leptopus (Günther, 1872)

Synonyms
- Bufo leptopus Günther, 1872; Ansonia longidigita gryllivoca Inger, 1960

= Ansonia leptopus =

Species of amphibian

Ansonia leptopus is a species of toad in the family Bufonidae. It is known from a few lowland localities in Borneo (including Brunei), Sumatra (Indonesia), and Peninsular Malaysia; it is reported as common in lowland Malaysian Borneo. Its presence in Peninsular Malaysia is uncertain. Its common names are brown slender toad, Matang stream toad, and cricket-voiced toad.

== Description ==
Males measure 30–40 mm (1.2–1.6 in) and females to 55 mm (2.2 in) in snout–vent length. There are low warts on the dorsum and brown or yellow spines under the mandible. Males have dark brown nuptial pads. The tadpoles are small (<20 mm (0.79 in)) and have unusual black markings on a light background. Compared to other Ansonia tadpoles, the oral sucker is less well-developed.

== Habitat and conservation ==
The species' natural habitat is primary rainforest. Adults occur widely dispersed on the forest floor and herb stratum. Calling males can be found sitting on boulders and rocks on river banks at night. Breeding is explosive and takes place in small, clear, rocky-bottomed streams. The tadpoles are most common in shallow side pools and in submerged beds of dead leaves.

It is threatened by habitat loss through deforestation, which also causes siltation of the streams.
