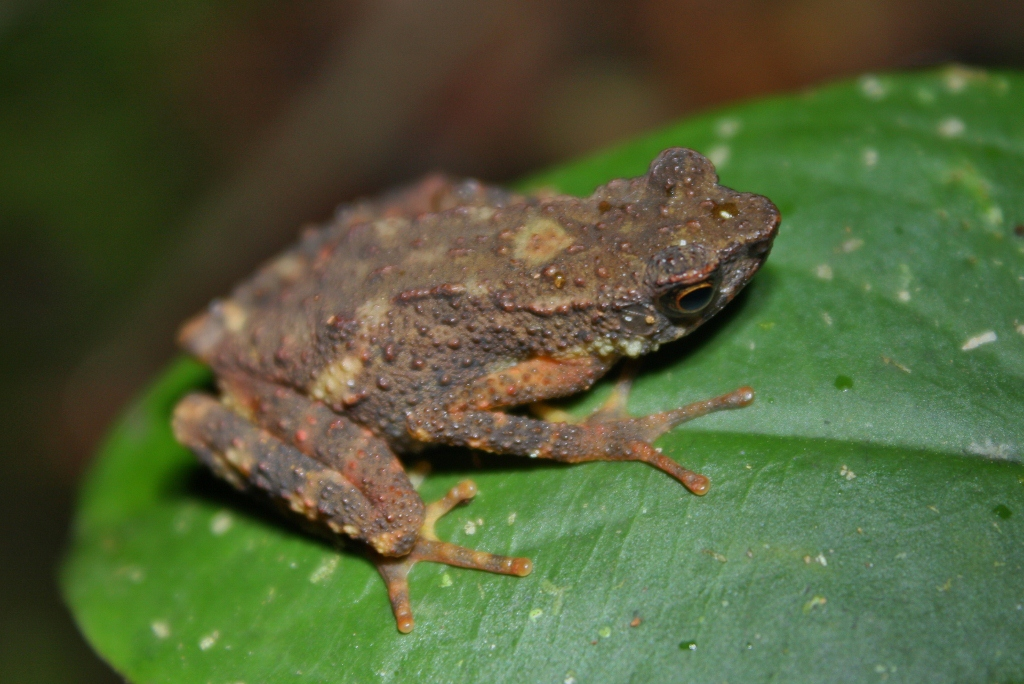
- Kinabalu slender toad

Scientific classification
- Kingdom: Animalia
- Phylum: Chordata
- Class: Amphibia
- Order: Anura
- Family: Bufonidae
- Genus: Ansonia; Stoliczka, 1870

Diversity
- 36 species (see text)

= Ansonia (frog) =

Genus of amphibians

Ansonia is a genus of true toads found in south India, northern Thailand, Malay Peninsula, Tioman Island, Borneo, and Mindanao (Philippines). These small forest species spawn in streams and have torrent-adapted tadpoles. Common name stream toads has been coined for the genus, although individual species are also being referred to as slender toads.

The genus was named by Stoliczka after the governor of Penang, Colonel Edward Anson.

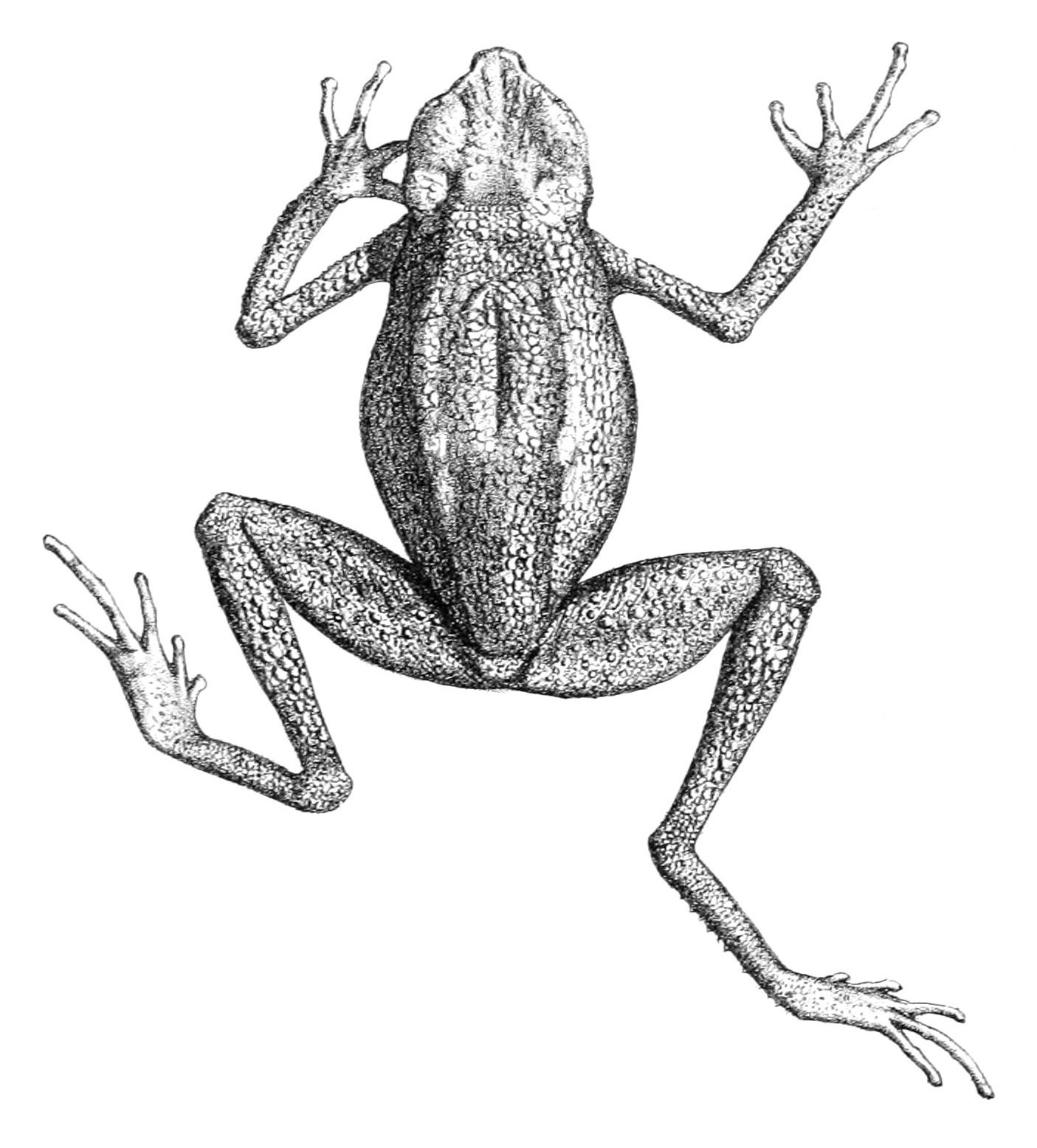
Ansonia leptopus

== Species ==
There are currently over 36 species in this genus:

Binomial name and authority	Common name
Ansonia albomaculata Inger, 1960	whitebelly stream toad
Ansonia echinata Inger & Stuebing, 2009	spiny slender toad
Ansonia endauensis Grismer, 2006	Endau stream toad
Ansonia fuliginea (Mocquard, 1890)	North Borneo stream toad
Ansonia glandulosa (Iskandar & Mumpuni, 2004)
Ansonia guibei Inger, 1966	Mesilau stream toad
Ansonia hanitschi Inger, 1960	Kadamaian stream toad
Ansonia infernalis Suwannapoom, Grismer, Pawangkhanant & Poyarkov, 2022	Infernal Stream Toad
Ansonia inthanon Matsui, Nabhitabhata & Panha, 1998	Inthanon stream toad
Ansonia jeetsukumarani Wood, Grismer, Norhayati, and Senawi, 2008
Ansonia karen Suwannapoom, Grismer, Pawangkhanant, Naiduangchan, Yushchenko, Arkhipov, Wilkinson & Poyarkov, 2021
Ansonia khaochangensis Grismer, Wood, Aowphol, Cota, Grismer, Murdoch, Aguilar, and Grismer, 2016
Ansonia kraensis Matsui, Khonsue, & Nabhitabhata, 2005	Kra stream toad
Ansonia kyaiktiyoensis Quah, Grismer, Wood, Thura, Oaks, and Lin, 2019
Ansonia latidisca Inger, 1966	Sambas stream toad
Ansonia latiffi Wood, Grismer, Norhayati, and Senawi, 2008
Ansonia latirostra Grismer, 2006
Ansonia leptopus (Günther, 1872)	Matang stream toad
Ansonia longidigita Inger, 1960	long-fingered stream toad
Ansonia lumut Chan, Wood, Anuar, Muin, Quah, Sumarli, and Grismer, 2014	mossy stream toad
Ansonia malayana Inger, 1960	pigmy false toad
Ansonia mcgregori (Taylor, 1922)	McGregor's stream toad
Ansonia minuta Inger, 1960	tiny stream toad
Ansonia muelleri (Boulenger, 1887)	Muller's stream toad
Ansonia penangensis Stoliczka, 1870	Penang stream toad
Ansonia phuketensis Matsui, Khonsue, and Panha, 2018
Ansonia pilokensis Matsui, Khonsue, and Panha, 2018
Ansonia platysoma (Inger, 1960	Luidan stream toad
Ansonia siamensis Kiew, 1985	Siamese stream toad
Ansonia smeagol Davies et al., 2016	Precious stream toad
Ansonia spinulifer (Mocquard, 1890)	Kina Balu stream toad
Ansonia teneritas Waser et al., 2016	Gracile slender toad
Ansonia thinthinae Wilkinson, Sellas, and Vindum, 2012
Ansonia tiomanica Hendrickson, 1966	Pulo Tioman stream toad
Ansonia torrentis Dring, 1983	Gunung Mulu stream toad
Ansonia vidua Hertwig, Min, Haas, and Das, 2014	widow slender toad
