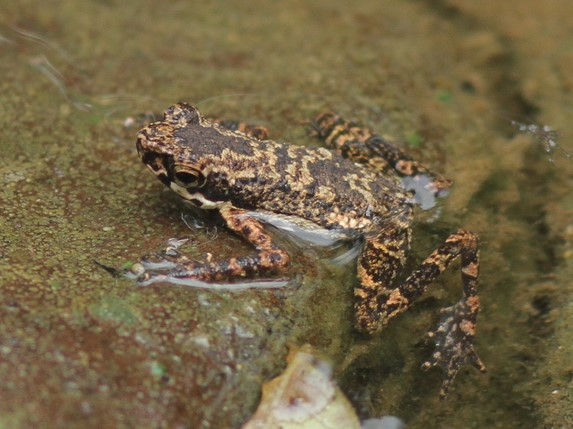

Conservation status
- Least Concern (IUCN 3.1)

Scientific classification
- Kingdom: Animalia
- Phylum: Chordata
- Class: Amphibia
- Order: Anura
- Family: Bufonidae
- Genus: Ansonia
- Species: A. mcgregori

Binomial name
- Ansonia mcgregori (Taylor, 1922)

Synonyms
- Bufo mcgregori Taylor, 1922

= Ansonia mcgregori =

Species of amphibian

Ansonia mcgregori is a species of toad in the family Bufonidae. It is endemic to central and western Mindanao, Philippines. The specific name mcgregori honors Richard Crittenden McGregor, an Australian ornithologist who collected the holotype. Common names McGregor's toad, McGregori's river toad, and McGregor's stream toad have been coined for it.

== Description ==
Adult males measure 32–39 mm (1.3–1.5 in) and adult females 43–50 mm (1.7–2.0 in) in snout–vent length. The tympanum is not visible. All the finger tips are rounded and have small discs, not wider than rest of the phalanges. The toes are almost fully webbed. The hind legs have crossbars. The adult males have a subgular vocal sac.

== Habitat and conservation ==
Ansonia mcgregori is a terrestrial toad associated with cool mountain streams and rivers in lower montane and lowland forests at elevations of 300–1,700 m (980–5,580 ft) above sea level. Individuals have been found above rocks covered with mosses, on rock crevices, and on leaf litter near streams. Although it is generally restricted to undisturbed or minimally disturbed habitats, a few individuals have been found in secondary forest, plantations, small-scale agroecosystems, and in the floor of a cave surrounded by farmland–disturbed lowland dipterocarp forest mosaic. Breeding takes place in streams.

This species is common in suitable habitat. It is threatened by habitat loss caused by small-scale agricultural activities, large-scale oil palm plantations, wood collection for charcoal production, and expanding human settlements. Furthermore, agricultural effluents, soil erosion, and mine tailings can impact its stream habitat. It is known to occur in several protected areas.
