= Pulchrana melanomenta =

Conservation status
- Data Deficient (IUCN 3.1)

Scientific classification
- Kingdom: Animalia
- Phylum: Chordata
- Class: Amphibia
- Order: Anura
- Family: Ranidae
- Genus: Pulchrana
- Species: P. melanomenta

Binomial name
- Pulchrana melanomenta (Taylor, 1920)

Synonyms
- Rana melanomenta Taylor, 1920; Hylarana melanomenta (Taylor, 1920)

Species of amphibian

Pulchrana melanomenta is a species of "true frog" in the family Ranidae. It is endemic to the Sulu Archipelago of the Philippines. It occurs in undisturbed and disturbed streams and rivers in lower montane and lowland forests. Breeding probably takes place in streams. It is potentially threatened by deforestation (logging) and by habitat conversion to agriculture, expanding human settlements, and nickel mining.
