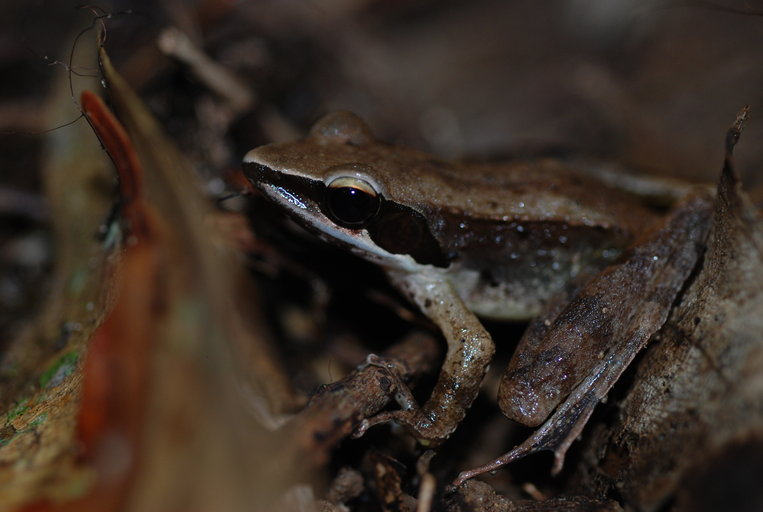
- Sanguirana sanguinea

Scientific classification
- Kingdom: Animalia
- Phylum: Chordata
- Class: Amphibia
- Order: Anura
- Family: Ranidae
- Genus: Sanguirana; Dubois, 1992

= Sanguirana =

Genus of amphibians

Sanguirana is a genus of true frogs (family Ranidae) found in the Malay Archipelago, including the Philippines, the Maluku Islands, Sulawesi, and Seram.

Sanguirana was first introduced as a sub-genus of Rana, with Rana sanguinea as the type species. All species, except the more recently described Sanguirana aurantipunctata and Sanguirana acai, were originally included in Rana; more recently, they have been placed in genus Hylarana. The delineation of the genus and its relationship to other ranid genera is still under discussion. At moment, the following species are included in the genus:

- Sanguirana acai Brown, Prue, Chan, Gaulke, Sanguila, and Siler, 2017
- Sanguirana aurantipunctata Fuiten, Welton, Diesmos, Barley, Oberheide, Duya, Rico, Brown, and Erwin, 2011
- Sanguirana everetti (Boulenger, 1882)
- Sanguirana igorota (Taylor, 1922)
- Sanguirana luzonensis (Boulenger, 1896)
- Sanguirana mearnsi (Stejneger, 1905)
- Sanguirana sanguinea (Boettger, 1893)
- Sanguirana tipanan (Brown, McGuire, and Diesmos, 2000)
