= Pulchrana debussyi =

Conservation status
- Data Deficient (IUCN 3.1)

Scientific classification
- Kingdom: Animalia
- Phylum: Chordata
- Class: Amphibia
- Order: Anura
- Family: Ranidae
- Genus: Pulchrana
- Species: P. debussyi

Binomial name
- Pulchrana debussyi (van Kampen, 1910)

Synonyms
- Rana debussyi van Kampen, 1910; Hylarana debussyi van Kampen, 1910)

Species of amphibian

Pulchrana debussyi is a species of true frog, family Ranidae. It is endemic to Sumatra, Indonesia. It is only known from its type locality in the Batak Mountains (also spelled as Battak Mountains). The holotype is now lost, and there are concerns about validity of this taxon—it might be a synonym of Sylvirana nigrovittata. Common name Battak frog has been proposed for it.

The holotype was collected at 1,000 m (3,300 ft) above sea level. There is no information on ecology or habitat requirements of this species that has been classified as "data deficient".
