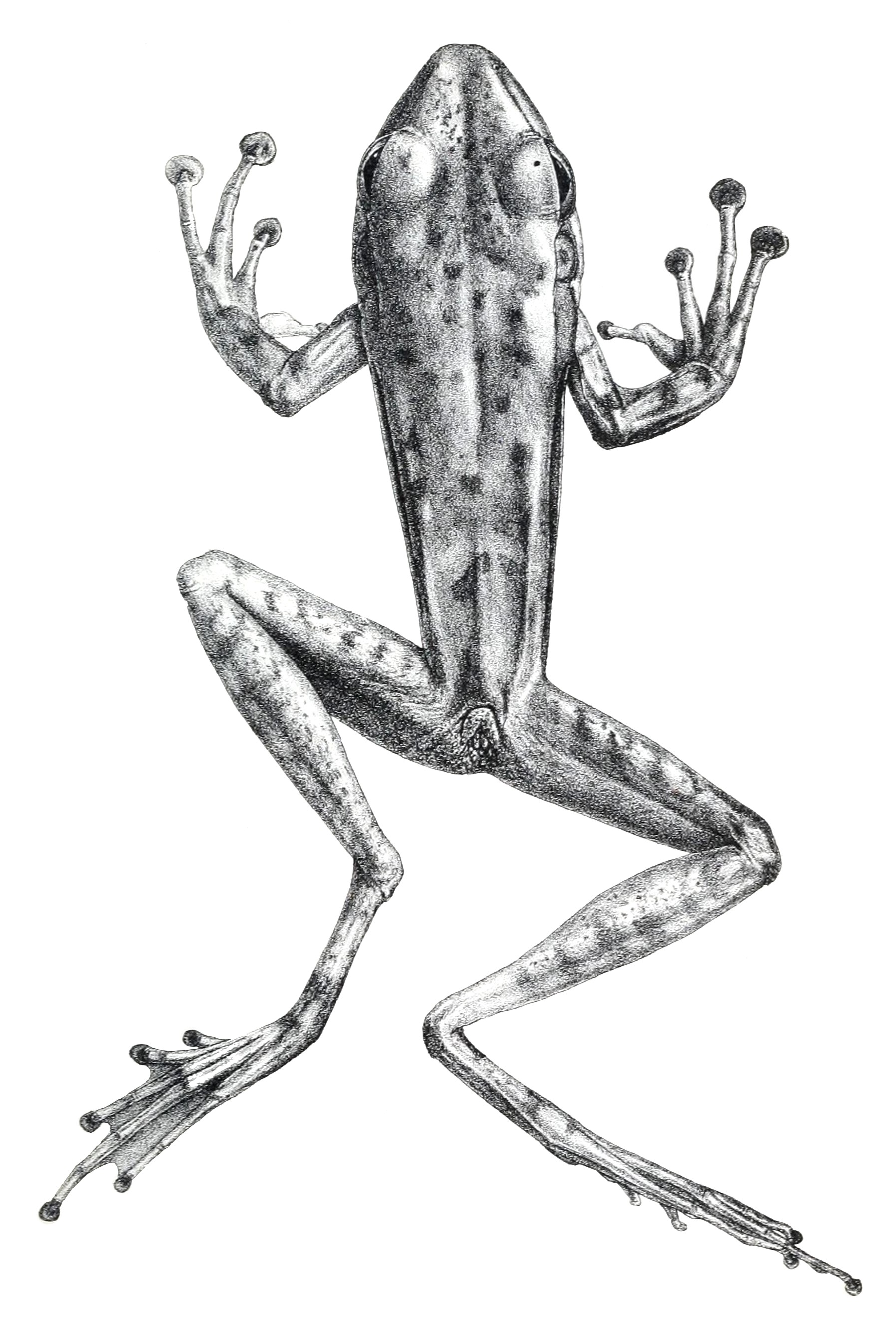
- Rana everetti = Hylarana everetti 1882

Conservation status
- Near Threatened (IUCN 3.1)

Scientific classification
- Kingdom: Animalia
- Phylum: Chordata
- Class: Amphibia
- Order: Anura
- Family: Ranidae
- Genus: Sanguirana
- Species: S. everetti

Binomial name
- Sanguirana everetti (Boulenger, 1882)

Synonyms
- Rana everetti Boulenger, 1882; Rana merrilli Taylor, 1922; Hydrophylax everetti Frost et al., 2006; Hylarana everetti Che et al., 2007; Chalcorana everetti Fei, Ye, and Jiang, 2010

= Sanguirana everetti =

Species of amphibian

Sanguirana everetti is a species of true frog. It is endemic to the island of Mindanao in the Philippines.
