= Ansonia latirostra =

Conservation status
- Data Deficient (IUCN 3.1)

Scientific classification
- Kingdom: Animalia
- Phylum: Chordata
- Class: Amphibia
- Order: Anura
- Family: Bufonidae
- Genus: Ansonia
- Species: A. latirostra

Binomial name
- Ansonia latirostra Grismer, 2006

Species of amphibian

Ansonia latirostra is a species of toads in the family Bufonidae. It is endemic to Peninsular Malaysia and only known from two sites in the Pahang state, one near Sungai Lembing (the type locality at 255 m (837 ft) above sea level) and another one near Mount Benom. It likely occurs more widely.

== Description ==
Males grow to 23.6 mm (0.93 in) and females 30.5 mm (1.20 in) in snout–vent length. The habitus is slender. The dorsum is black, apart from a brown interscapular spot and brown reticulum. The flanks are also black apart from two brown spots. There is a small cream-colored spot below the eye.

== Habitat and conservation ==
The species inhabits closed-canopy hill dipterocarp forests. It is associated with streams where animals have been found in vegetation overhanging the stream bed (≤2 m above the ground) or on the tops of large rocks along the edge of the stream. Habitat loss caused by logging and agricultural expansion is likely a threat to this species.
