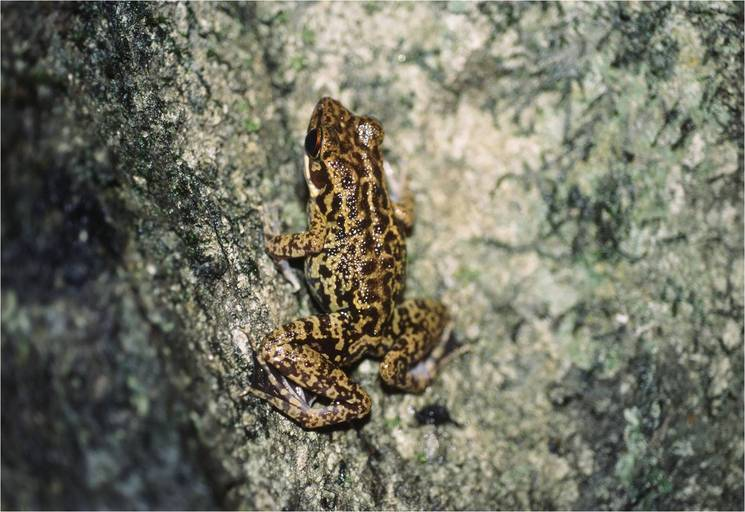

Conservation status
- Least Concern (IUCN 3.1)

Scientific classification
- Kingdom: Animalia
- Phylum: Chordata
- Class: Amphibia
- Order: Anura
- Family: Ranidae
- Genus: Pulchrana
- Species: P. moellendorffi

Binomial name
- Pulchrana moellendorffi (Boettger, 1893)

Synonyms
- Rana moellendorffi Boettger, 1893; Hylarana moellendorffi (Boettger, 1893)

= Pulchrana moellendorffi =

Species of amphibian

Pulchrana moellendorffi, also known as the Culion frog, is a species of "true frog", family Ranidae. It is endemic to the Palawan Island group of the Philippines. It inhabits streams and rivers in lower montane and lowland forests. It is threatened by habitat loss.
