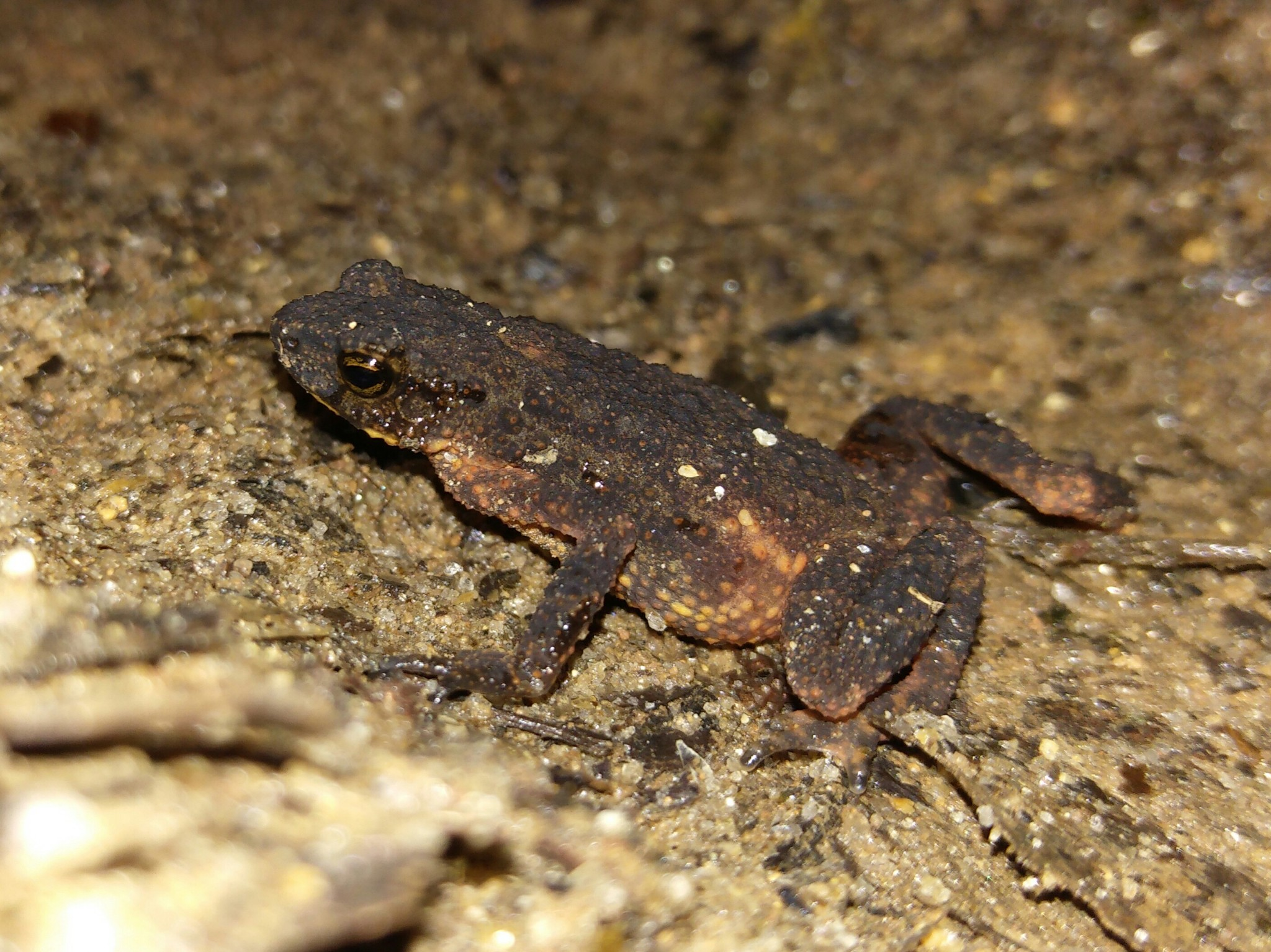

Conservation status
- Least Concern (IUCN 3.1)

Scientific classification
- Kingdom: Animalia
- Phylum: Chordata
- Class: Amphibia
- Order: Anura
- Family: Bufonidae
- Genus: Ansonia
- Species: A. inthanon

Binomial name
- Ansonia inthanon Matsui, Nabhitabhata & Panha, 1998

= Ansonia inthanon =

Species of amphibian

Ansonia inthanon is a species of toad in the family Bufonidae.

A small stream toad, measuring only 22-26mm in length. Its natural habitat is near torrents in subtropical forest on sloping land. It is threatened by habitat loss for agriculture, use by medical research (although this is not a significant threat) and by the introduced American bullfrog. Though it is only known from Doi Inthanon National Park and Thongphaphum in Kanchanaburi Province, it is not rare in suitable habitat. The species was recently discovered in a third locality, Doi Suthep National Park in Chiang Mai Province, and may also exist in similar habitat in northern Thailand and adjacent Myanmar.
