= Pulchrana banjarana =

Conservation status
- Least Concern (IUCN 3.1)

Scientific classification
- Kingdom: Animalia
- Phylum: Chordata
- Class: Amphibia
- Order: Anura
- Family: Ranidae
- Genus: Pulchrana
- Species: P. banjarana

Binomial name
- Pulchrana banjarana (Leong and Lim, 2003)

Synonyms
- Rana banjarana Leong and Lim, 2003; Hylarana banjarana (Leong and Lim, 2003)

Species of amphibian

Pulchrana banjarana is a species of true frogs, family Ranidae. It is endemic to the Malay Peninsula, occurring from the extreme southern Thailand to Peninsular Malaysia; however, it might also occur in Sumatra (Indonesia). The specific name banjarana is derived from the Malay word for "mountain range", banjaran, and refers to the distribution of this species in the highlands of the Malay Peninsula.

== Description ==
Adult males measure 35–37 mm (1.4–1.5 in) in snout–vent length. The overall appearance is moderately stocky. The head is longer than it is wide and the snout is obtuse, slightly projecting, and rounded in profile. The tympanum is distinct and the supratympanic fold is present. The fingers and the toes bear small discs with circum-marginal grooves. The toes are partially webbed. The colouration of the dorsum and the sides is olive brown–orange brown with black reticulations; black pigmentation is usually absent from the tip of the snout, canthus rostralis, margin of upper eyelid, and dorsolateral folds. The lores are black, the iris is orange, and the tympanum is deep brown. The limbs (except for the upper arms) have black barring or reticulation. The ventrum is light grey to dark brown with some white spots.

== Habitat and conservation ==
Pulchrana banjarana inhabits streams in highland and montane tropical forests at elevations of 700–1,300 m (2,300–4,300 ft) above sea level. Males call from the sides of forest streams while perched low on fallen branches or live vegetation, or on sandy banks or leaf litter. The tadpoles occur in slow-flowing stream sections with sandy bottom. It is becoming rare, but it is not yet considered threatened by the IUCN.
