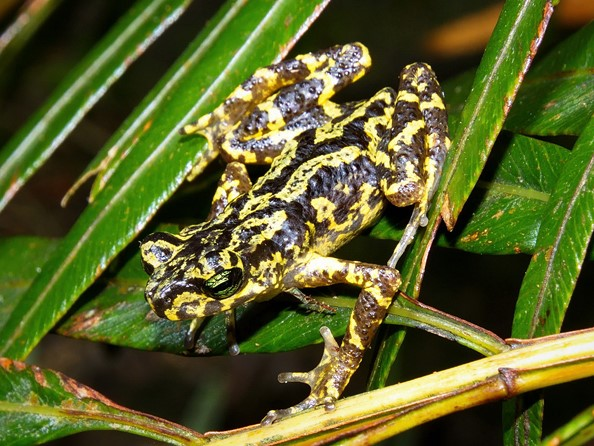

Conservation status
- Endangered (IUCN 3.1)

Scientific classification
- Kingdom: Animalia
- Phylum: Chordata
- Class: Amphibia
- Order: Anura
- Family: Bufonidae
- Genus: Ansonia
- Species: A. siamensis

Binomial name
- Ansonia siamensis Kiew, 1985

= Ansonia siamensis =

Species of amphibian

Ansonia siamensis is a species of toad in the family Bufonidae. It is endemic to the Khao Chong Mountains of peninsular Thailand. Its natural habitats are subtropical or tropical moist lowland forests and rivers.
