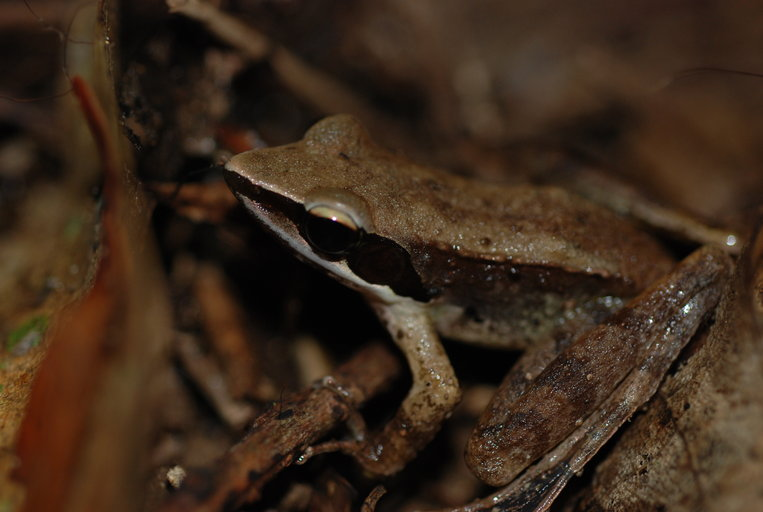

Conservation status
- Least Concern (IUCN 3.1)

Scientific classification
- Kingdom: Animalia
- Phylum: Chordata
- Class: Amphibia
- Order: Anura
- Family: Ranidae
- Genus: Sanguirana
- Species: S. sanguinea

Binomial name
- Sanguirana sanguinea (Boettger, 1893)

Synonyms
- Rana sanguinea Boettger, 1893; Rana varians Boulenger, 1894

= Sanguirana sanguinea =

Species of amphibian

Sanguirana sanguinea is a species of frog in the family Ranidae. It is found in Sulawesi, Indonesia and Palawan, the Philippines.

Its natural habitats are subtropical or tropical moist lowland forests, subtropical or tropical swamps, rivers, swamps, intermittent freshwater marshes, rural gardens, and heavily degraded former forest. It is not considered threatened by the IUCN.
