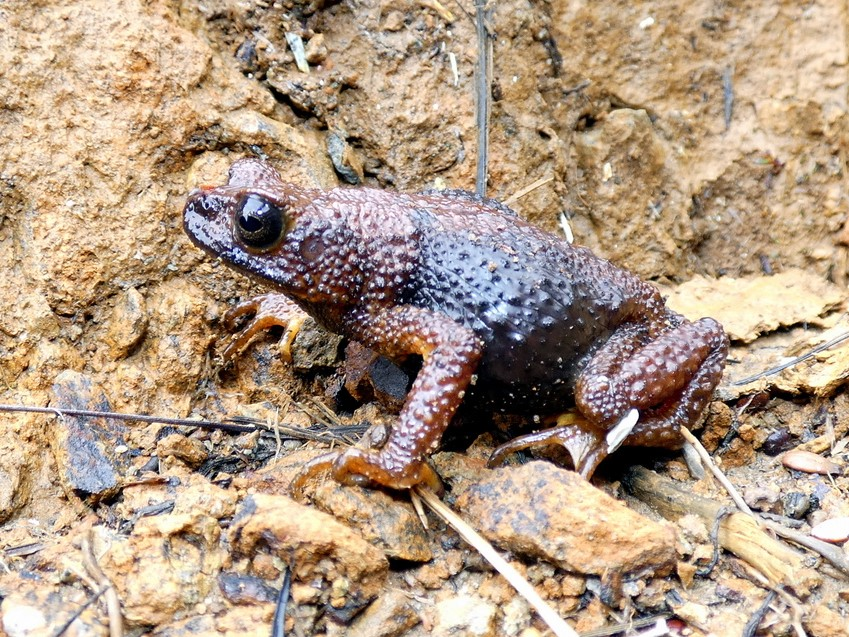

Conservation status
- Least Concern (IUCN 3.1)

Scientific classification
- Kingdom: Animalia
- Phylum: Chordata
- Class: Amphibia
- Order: Anura
- Family: Bufonidae
- Genus: Ansonia
- Species: A. fuliginea

Binomial name
- Ansonia fuliginea (Mocquard, 1890)

Synonyms
- Bufo fuligineus Mocquard, 1890; Nectophryne altitudinis Smith, 1931; Ansonia altitudinis (Smith, 1931)

= Ansonia fuliginea =

Species of amphibian

Ansonia fuliginea, the North Borneo stream toad or North Borneo slender toad, is a species of toad in the family Bufonidae. It is endemic to Mount Kinabalu in Sabah, Malaysian Borneo.

== Description ==
Males measure 32–36 mm (1.3–1.4 in) and females 38–44 mm (1.5–1.7 in) in snout–vent length. The body is relatively stocky. The snout is round. The tympanum is distinct. The flanks are darker than the middle dorsum and the head. The belly is also mostly dark. There are many rounded warts on the upper surfaces; the belly is granular. The tips of fingers and toes are swollen but without disks.

The tadpoles are unknown.

== Habitat and conservation ==
The species' natural habitats are moist montane and sub-alpine forests at elevations of 1,600–3,480 m (5,250–11,420 ft) above sea level—the highest of all Bornean amphibians. Adults are terrestrial; the tadpoles presumably develop in streams. This rarely encountered species occurs in the Kinabalu Park, which is well protected. Whether it occurs outside the park is unknown. Selective logging is a potential threat.
