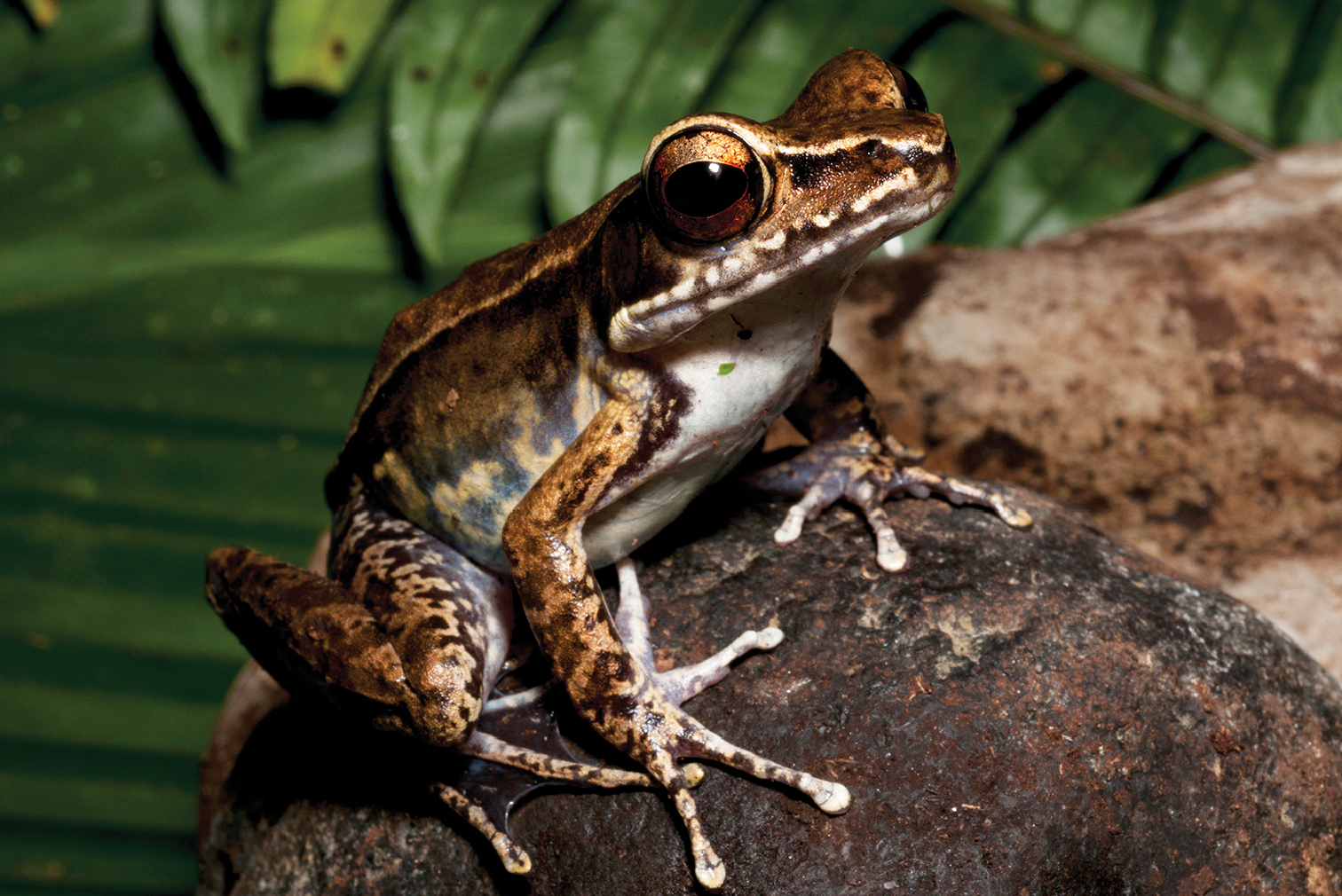

Conservation status
- Least Concern (IUCN 3.1)

Scientific classification
- Kingdom: Animalia
- Phylum: Chordata
- Class: Amphibia
- Order: Anura
- Family: Ranidae
- Genus: Pulchrana
- Species: P. grandocula

Binomial name
- Pulchrana grandocula (Taylor, 1920)

Synonyms
- Rana grandocula Taylor, 1920; Rana philippinensis Taylor, 1920; Rana yakani Taylor, 1922; Hylarana grandocula (Taylor, 1920)

= Pulchrana grandocula =

Species of amphibian

Pulchrana grandocula, also known as the big-eyed frog, is a species of "true frog", family Ranidae. It is endemic to the southern Philippines and occurs on the islands of Basilan, Bohol, Camiguin Sur, Dinagat, Samar, Siargao, Bucas Grande, and Mindanao. Some populations from Mindanao formerly assigned to this species are now recognized as a separate species, Pulchrana guttmani.

Pulchrana grandocula occurs in streams and rivers in montane and lowland forests at elevations below 1,500 m (4,900 ft). It occurs in both undisturbed and disturbed habitats. Reproduction takes place in streams where also the tadpoles develop. Threats to this species are habitat loss and pollution, although it is a common species that has a stable population overall. It occurs in several protected areas.
