= Ansonia guibei =

Conservation status
- Critically Endangered (IUCN 3.1)

Scientific classification
- Kingdom: Animalia
- Phylum: Chordata
- Class: Amphibia
- Order: Anura
- Family: Bufonidae
- Genus: Ansonia
- Species: A. guibei

Binomial name
- Ansonia guibei Inger, 1966
- Ansonia guibei is only known with certainty from near Mesilau in the Kinabalu National Park in Malaysian Borneo

Species of amphibian

Ansonia guibei is a species of toad in the family Bufonidae. It is endemic to northwestern Sabah in Malaysian Borneo. The specific name guibei honors Jean Guibé, a French zoologist and herpetologist. Common names Mesilau toad and Mesilau stream toad have been coined for it.

== Description ==
Males grow to about 30 mm (1.2 in) and females to 34 mm (1.3 in) in snout–vent length. The overall appearance is slender. The head is as wide as it is long. The tympanum is distinct. The canthus rostralis is sharp. The fingers are slender with expanded tips but without discs. The toes are extensively webbed. Skin has many warts dorsally and is granular on the sides and the ventrum. Alcohol-preserved specimens are blackish brown above, with light spots forming an indistinct dark pattern. Ventral surfaces are whitish with brown suffusion on the throat and spots on the chest.

The tadpoles are dark brown to black on the upper side.

== Habitat and conservation ==
Adult Ansonia guibei range widely over the floor of montane and submontane forests at elevations of 1,300–2,000 m (4,300–6,600 ft) above sea level. Breeding takes place in small, clear, rocky-bottomed streams. The tadpoles live in the torrents, clinging to rocks and feeding on lithophytes.

This species was once considered very abundant near Mesilau in the Kinabalu National Park. However, this population was decimated in 2015 by earthquakes and subsequent landslides. It is uncertain whether the species still survives near Mesilau (or elsewhere). If it still persists, it could be threatened by infrastructure development for tourism.
