= Ansonia glandulosa =

Conservation status
- Least Concern (IUCN 3.1)

Scientific classification
- Kingdom: Animalia
- Phylum: Chordata
- Class: Amphibia
- Order: Anura
- Family: Bufonidae
- Genus: Ansonia
- Species: A. glandulosa

Binomial name
- Ansonia glandulosa Iskandar & Mumpuni, 2004

Species of amphibian

Ansonia glandulosa is a species of toads in the family Bufonidae. It is endemic to Sumatra, Indonesia, where it is only known from its type locality, Napal Licin in the Musi Rawas Regency. The holotype, the only known representative of this species, was found close to a small stream in lowland tropical rainforest; the locality is influenced by regular flooding during the rainy season.
