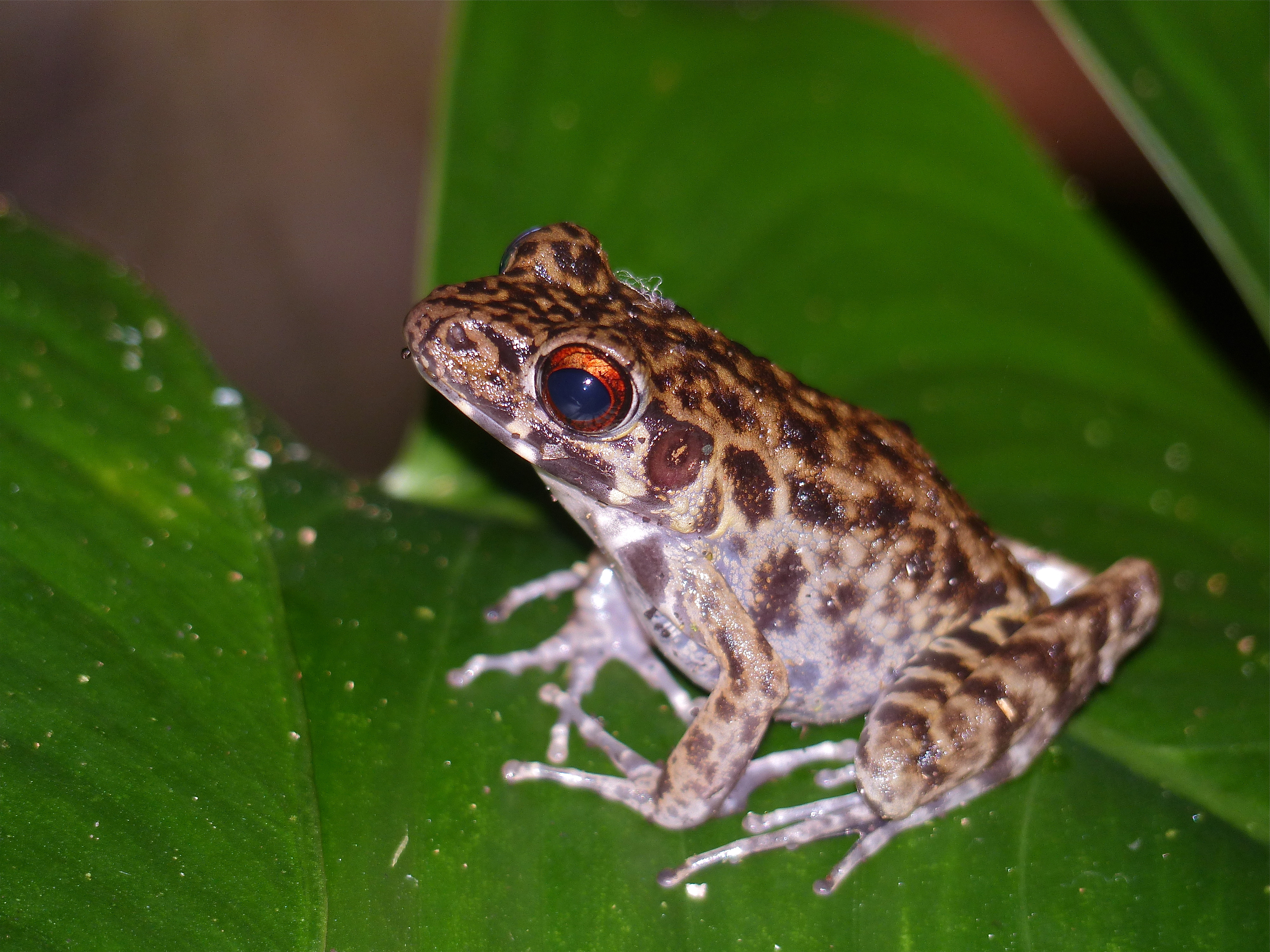
- Pulchrana glandulosa

Scientific classification
- Kingdom: Animalia
- Phylum: Chordata
- Class: Amphibia
- Order: Anura
- Family: Ranidae
- Genus: Pulchrana; Dubois, 1992

= Pulchrana =

Genus of amphibians

Pulchrana is a genus of ranid frogs found in south-eastern Asia, Indonesia and the Philippines.

== Species ==
The following species are recognised in the genus Pulchrana:

- Pulchrana banjarana (Leong and Lim, 2003)
- Pulchrana baramica (Boettger, 1900)
- Pulchrana centropeninsularis (Chan, Brown, Lim, Ahmad, and Grismer, 2014)
- Pulchrana debussyi (Van Kampen, 1910)
- Pulchrana fantastica Arifin, Cahyadi, Smart, Jankowski, and Haas, 2018
- Pulchrana glandulosa (Boulenger, 1882)
- Pulchrana grandocula (Taylor, 1920)
- Pulchrana guttmani (Brown, 2015)
- Pulchrana laterimaculata (Barbour and Noble, 1916)
- Pulchrana mangyanum (Brown and Guttman, 2002)
- Pulchrana melanomenta (Taylor, 1920)
- Pulchrana moellendorffi (Boettger, 1893)
- Pulchrana picturata (Boulenger, 1920)
- Pulchrana rawa (Matsui, Mumpuni, and Hamidy, 2012)
- Pulchrana siberu (Dring, McCarthy, and Whitten, 1990)
- Pulchrana signata (Günther, 1872)
- Pulchrana similis (Günther, 1873)
