= Ansonia endauensis =

Conservation status
- Near Threatened (IUCN 3.1)

Scientific classification
- Kingdom: Animalia
- Phylum: Chordata
- Class: Amphibia
- Order: Anura
- Family: Bufonidae
- Genus: Ansonia
- Species: A. endauensis

Binomial name
- Ansonia endauensis Grismer, 2006

Species of amphibian

Ansonia endauensis is a species of toads in the family Bufonidae. It is endemic to the Malay Peninsula and only known from the Endau-Rompin National Park in southern Peninsular Malaysia.

== Description ==
The distinguishing features of the species include unique red eye color, dual vocal slits in males, and a unique combination of head, body, digit, and color pattern characteristics. Males grow to at least 17.4 mm (0.69 in) and females to 28.5 mm (1.12 in) in snout–vent length. The habitus is slender. The dorsum is almost uniformly black, with orange spots on the flanks, the sides of neck and head, as well as below the eye.

== Habitat and conservation ==
The species inhabits closed-canopy lowland forest. All individuals were collected from a small, rocky stream 46 m (151 ft) above sea level, where they were found in vegetation overhanging the stream bed, less than one metre above the ground.

The known population lives within a well-protected reserve. Habitat loss caused by logging and agricultural expansion is a probably threat outside the reserve.
