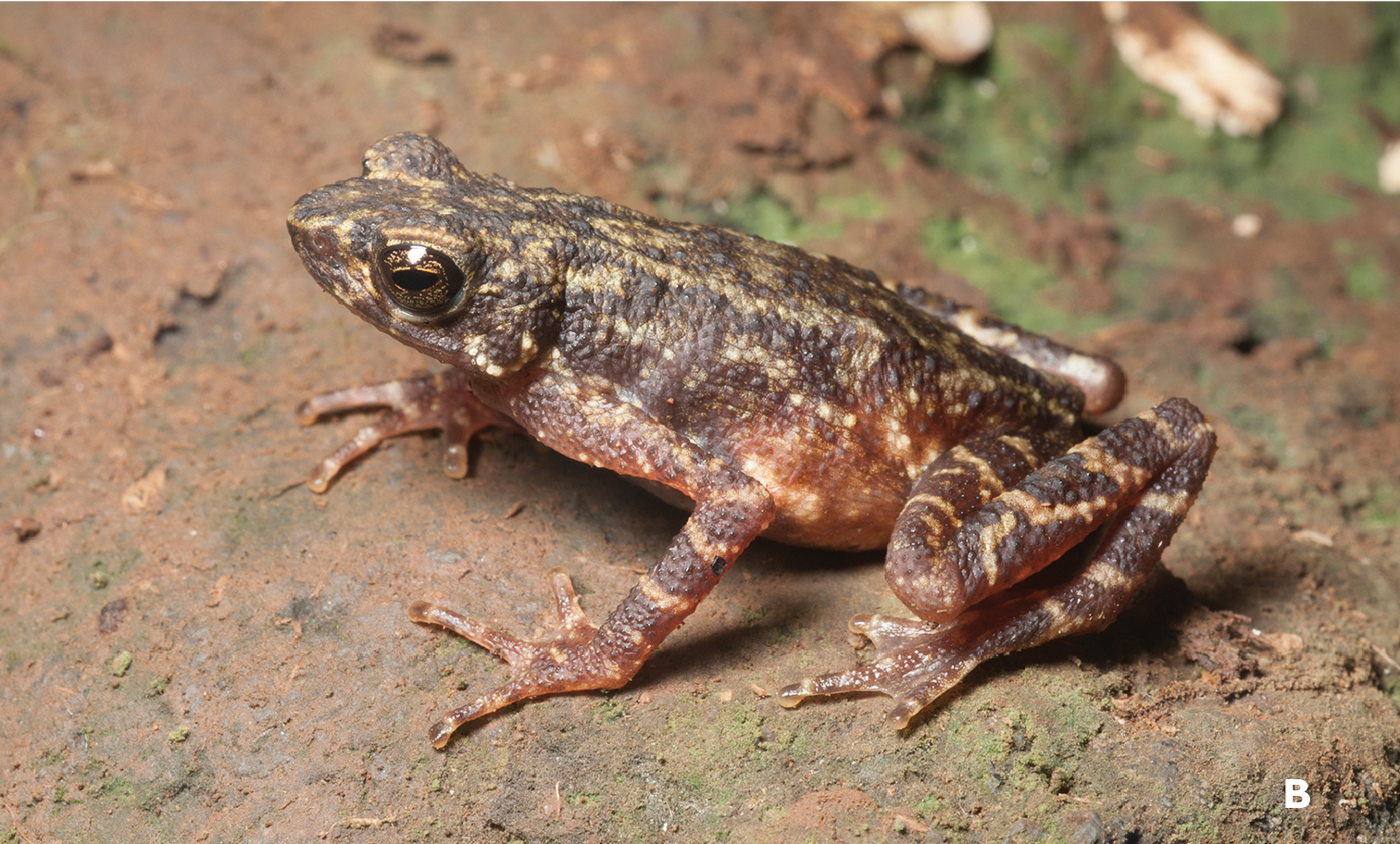
- Female

Conservation status
- Least Concern (IUCN 3.1)

Scientific classification
- Kingdom: Animalia
- Phylum: Chordata
- Class: Amphibia
- Order: Anura
- Family: Bufonidae
- Genus: Ansonia
- Species: A. muelleri

Binomial name
- Ansonia muelleri (Boulenger, 1887)

= Ansonia muelleri =

Species of amphibian

Ansonia muelleri, commonly known as Mueller's toad, is a species of toad in the family Bufonidae. It is endemic to the Philippines.

Its natural habitats are subtropical or tropical dry forests, subtropical or tropical moist lowland forests, subtropical or tropical moist montane forests, rivers, intermittent rivers, and freshwater springs. It is threatened by habitat loss.
