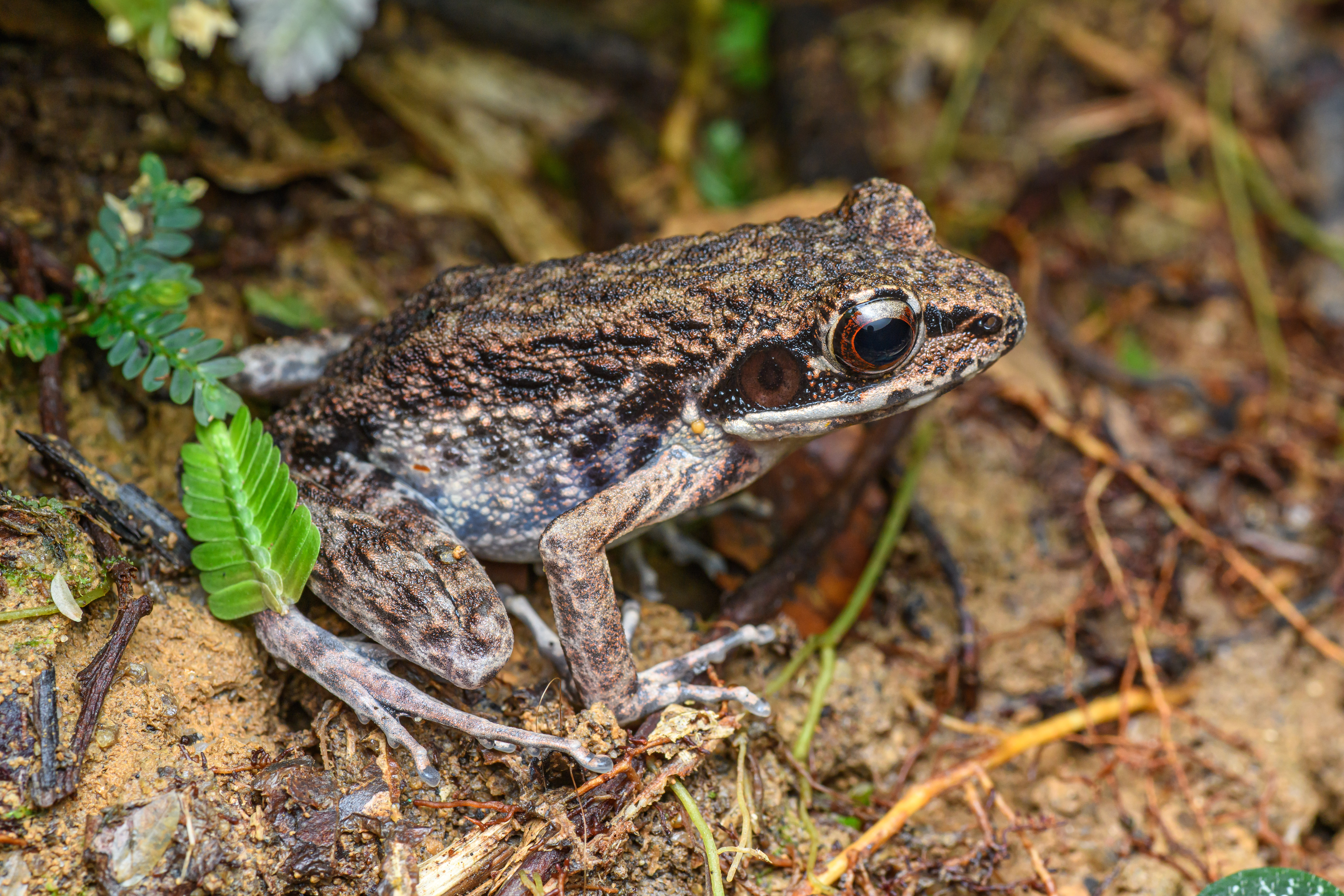

Conservation status
- Least Concern (IUCN 3.1)

Scientific classification
- Kingdom: Animalia
- Phylum: Chordata
- Class: Amphibia
- Order: Anura
- Family: Ranidae
- Genus: Pulchrana
- Species: P. laterimaculata

Binomial name
- Pulchrana laterimaculata (Barbour and Noble, 1916)

Synonyms
- Rana laterimaculata Barbour and Noble, 1916; Hylarana laterimaculata (Barbour and Noble, 1916)

= Pulchrana laterimaculata =

Species of amphibian

Pulchrana laterimaculata, also known as the side-spotted swamp frog, is a species of "true frog", family Ranidae. It is found on the Malay Peninsula from the southernmost Thailand through Malaysia to Singapore, in Sarawak in Borneo, and on the Natuna Besar island in the Indonesian part of the South China Sea.

Pulchrana laterimaculata inhabits lowland freshwater and peat swamp forests. Males call from leaf-litter on the forest floor or perched on low vegetation, less than one metre above ground. While it is locally abundant in suitable habitat and can occur in disturbed habitats adjacent to good stands of intact forest, it can locally suffer from habitat loss. It is believed to be present in several protected areas.
