= Ansonia albomaculata =

Conservation status
- Least Concern (IUCN 3.1)

Scientific classification
- Kingdom: Animalia
- Phylum: Chordata
- Class: Amphibia
- Order: Anura
- Family: Bufonidae
- Genus: Ansonia
- Species: A. albomaculata

Binomial name
- Ansonia albomaculata Inger, 1960

Species of amphibian

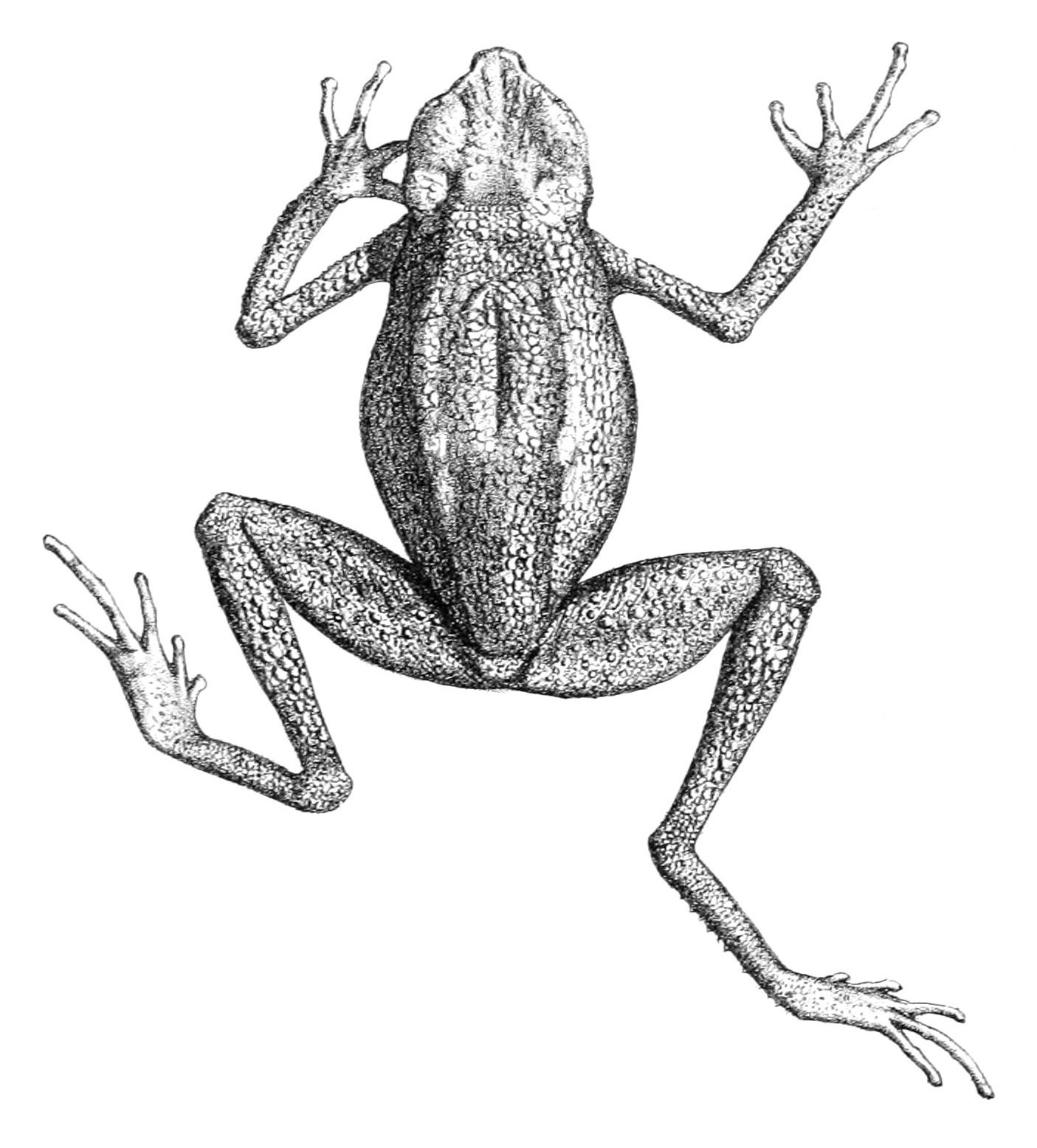

Ansonia albomaculata, also known as the white-lipped slender toad and whitebelly stream toad, is a species of toad in the family Bufonidae. It is endemic to the island of Borneo and can be found in Sabah and Sarawak (Malaysia), Brunei, and northern Kalimantan (Indonesia).

== Description ==
Males grow to 30 mm (1.2 in) and females to 35 mm (1.4 in) in snout–vent length. The overall appearance is slender. The head is wider than it is long. The snout is truncate. The tympanum is visible but partly concealed by skin. The finger tips are rounded. The fingers are long and have rudimentary webbing. The toes are webbed and have small rounded disks at their tips. A distinct ridge runs along inner margin of the tarsus. The dorsum is dark brown and warty, albeit the warts being low. There is a light spot on the upper jaw, below the eye.

Tadpoles probably belonging to this species are small, total length 10–14 mm (0.4–0.6 in). They have an oval body that is dorsoventrally depressed and a bluntly rounded tail.

== Habitat and conservation ==
Ansonia albomaculata is a lowland stream-associated species that is known from elevations between 150 and 500 m (490 and 1,640 ft) above sea level. Adults are mostly terrestrial and disperse widely over the rainforest floor. They breed in small, clear, rocky-bottomed streams. The tadpoles live in torrents where they cling to rocks and feed on lithophytes.

Ansonia albomaculata is known from widely scattered localities and is generally considered rare, although it can be abundant at some places. It does not adapt to habitat modification and is threatened by forest loss and fragmentation caused by conversion of forests to rubber and oil palm plantations. These also negatively affect the larval habitat through siltation and through eutrophication caused by chemical fertilizers. However, it is present in several protected areas.
