= Ansonia torrentis =

Conservation status
- Least Concern (IUCN 3.1)

Scientific classification
- Kingdom: Animalia
- Phylum: Chordata
- Class: Amphibia
- Order: Anura
- Family: Bufonidae
- Genus: Ansonia
- Species: A. torrentis

Binomial name
- Ansonia torrentis Dring, 1983

Species of amphibian

Ansonia torrentis, also known as the Gunung Mulu stream toad and torrent slender toad, is a species of toad in the family Bufonidae. It is endemic to Mount Mulu in Sarawak, Borneo (Malaysia). The specific name torrentis refers to the habitat at its type locality, a stream running down a steep mountainside.

== Description ==
Adult males measure 31–33 mm (1.2–1.3 in) in snout–vent length. The overall appearance is slender. The snout is truncate from above but obliquely projecting when viewed from the side. The tympanum is distinct. The fingers are sender and bear small terminal discs. The toe tips are swollen. No webbing is present. The dorsum is covered with numerous rounded tubercles. Dorsal colouration is blackish. There are obscure brown markings. The flanks have yellowish to pale brown marbling. The limbs have narrow cross-bars.

== Habitat and conservation ==
Ansonia torrentis is known from beside a small, clear, mountain stream with a steep gradient at about 1,800 m (5,900 ft) above sea level. Males were mostly calling from low vegetation on rock faces bordering a stream section with steep water chutes and small rock pools. The tadpoles presumably develop in this same stream habitat.

The known distribution of this species is within the Gunung Mulu National Park. It is believed to be reasonably abundant there. Although the range is limited, the habitat is well-protected and not threatened at present.
