= Pulchrana centropeninsularis =

Conservation status
- Least Concern (IUCN 3.1)

Scientific classification
- Kingdom: Animalia
- Phylum: Chordata
- Class: Amphibia
- Order: Anura
- Family: Ranidae
- Genus: Pulchrana
- Species: P. centropeninsularis

Binomial name
- Pulchrana centropeninsularis (Chan, Brown, Lim, Ahmad, and Grismer, 2014)

Synonyms
- Hylarana centropeninsularis Chan, Brown, Lim, Ahmad, and Grismer, 2014

Species of amphibian

Pulchrana centropeninsularis is a species of "true frog", family Ranidae. It is found in Peninsular Malaysia and Sumatra (Indonesia). The specific name centropeninsularis refers to the area of its original discovery, the state of Pahang in the central Peninsular Malaysia. Later on, it has also been recorded in the province of Jambi in east-central Sumatra. Pulchrana centropeninsularis is a rare species known from few individuals only. Prior to its description, Pulchrana centropeninsularis was confused with Pulchrana siberu, its closest relative.

== Description ==
Adult males measure 36–40 mm (1.4–1.6 in) in snout–vent length; females are unknown. The snout is rounded. The tympanum is distinct and the supratympanic fold is prominent. The limbs are long and slender. The fingers lack webbing while the toes have reduced webbing. Both the fingers and toes have tips that are dilated into small, pointed discs. The mid-dorsal region is entirely black and laterally delimited by complete, orange dorsolater stripes that originate from the rostrum and terminate at the sacrum, forming a near-complete loop. The flanks and dorsal side of limbs bear round, creamy yellow spots, some of them connecting to form short bars. The venter is grayish-brown; the throat has whitish spots and the belly has whitish reticulations.

Males have paired subgular vocal sacs.

== Habitat and conservation ==
Pulchrana centropeninsularis inhabits primary and secondary lowland forests; in Malaysia, its elevational range is 90–105 m (295–344 ft) above sea level. It is associated with swamps. Although the type series was collected away from streams, the IUCN SSC Amphibian Specialist Group suggests that it breeds in streams.

Pulchrana centropeninsularis is a rare species known from a few locations and individuals. Although tolerance of this species to habitat disturbance is unknown, the heavy human impact on and the disappearance of swamp habitats that is taking place throughout Southeast Asia, mostly because of agricultural development for oil palm and for urban development, is considered a threat to this species. Pulchrana centropeninsularis is present in Lakum Forest Reserve (its type locality) and Krau Wildlife Reserve, both in Peninsular Malaysia.
