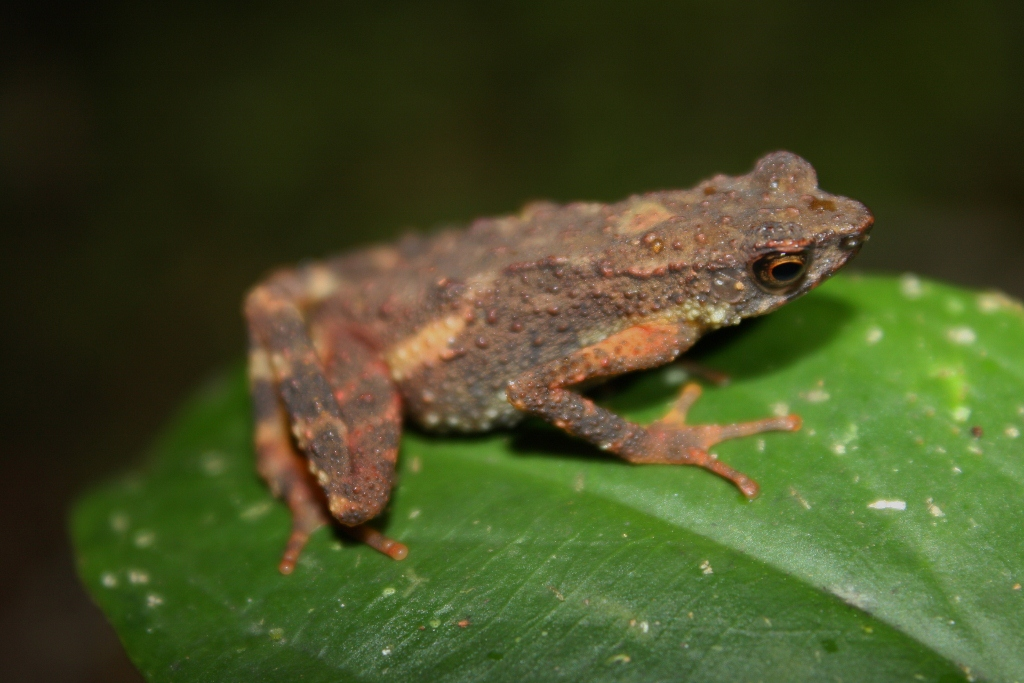

Conservation status
- Least Concern (IUCN 3.1)

Scientific classification
- Kingdom: Animalia
- Phylum: Chordata
- Class: Amphibia
- Order: Anura
- Family: Bufonidae
- Genus: Ansonia
- Species: A. hanitschi

Binomial name
- Ansonia hanitschi Inger, 1960

= Ansonia hanitschi =

Species of amphibian

Ansonia hanitschi (common name: Kadamaian stream toad) is a species of toad in the family Bufonidae. It is endemic to mountains of Borneo and found in both Malaysia (Sarawak and Sabah) and Indonesia (northern Kalimantan). Its natural habitats are submontane and montane forests. It inhabits the forest floor. Breeding takes place in clear, rocky mountain streams. It is threatened by habitat loss (siltation of streams needed for larval development, clearance of forests for cultivation).
