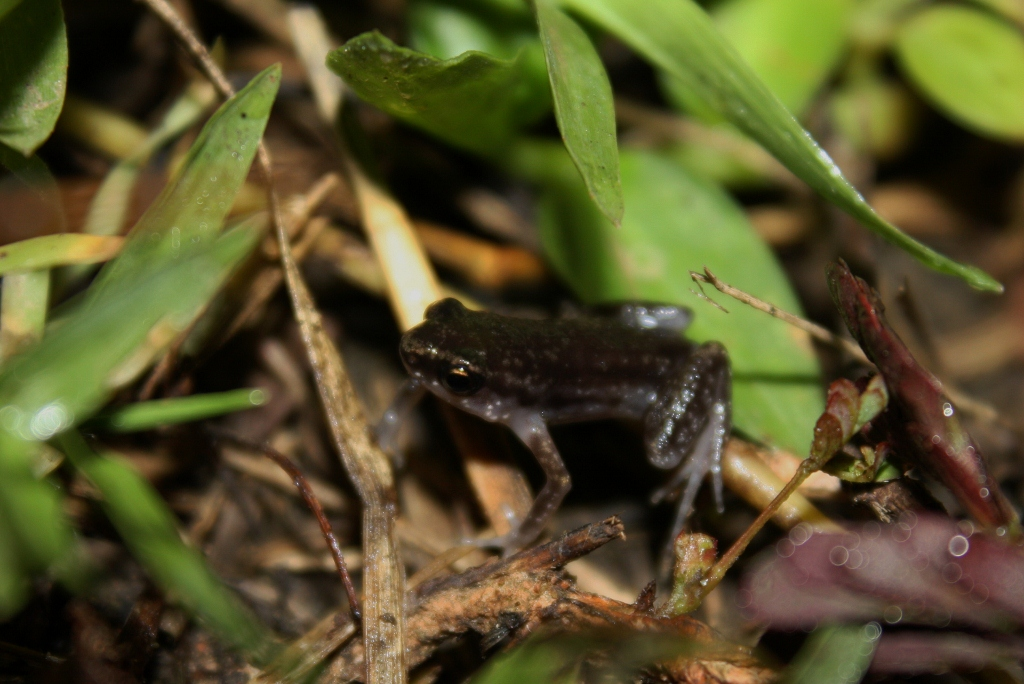

Conservation status
- Least Concern (IUCN 3.1)

Scientific classification
- Kingdom: Animalia
- Phylum: Chordata
- Class: Amphibia
- Order: Anura
- Family: Bufonidae
- Genus: Ansonia
- Species: A. malayana

Binomial name
- Ansonia malayana Inger, 1960

= Ansonia malayana =

Species of amphibian

Ansonia malayana is a species of toad in the family Bufonidae. It is also known as Malayan slender toad, Malaya stream toad, and pigmy false toad. It is found on the Malay Peninsula, from the Kra Isthmus (Thailand) southward to Peninsular Malaysia. However, its precise distribution in Thailand is poorly known as it may have been confused with Ansonia kraensis, described as a new species in 2005; it may also represent more than one species.

== Description ==
Ansonia malayana males measure 20–22 mm (0.79–0.87 in) and females 25–28 mm (0.98–1.10 in) in snout–vent length or slightly more. Tympanum is distinct. Dorsum has small round warts and tubercles and is dark brown in colour, with greenish yellow marks, an interrupted light interorbital chevron, a light interscapular spot, and an interrupted light dorsolateral arc. Limbs have yellowish crossbars. Sides of head and body have small yellow spots.

== Habitat ==
Its natural habitats are lowland and montane tropical moist forests. It breeds in streams (where the tadpole develop), and adults are often found in boulder crevices and leaf-litter in streams. It is found at altitudes between 300 and 1,300 m. It is potentially threatened by habitat loss.
