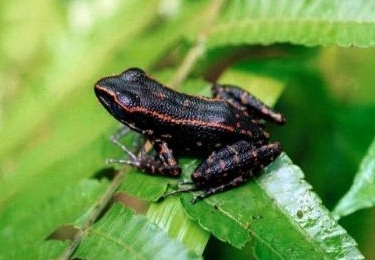

Conservation status
- Least Concern (IUCN 3.1)

Scientific classification
- Kingdom: Animalia
- Phylum: Chordata
- Class: Amphibia
- Order: Anura
- Family: Ranidae
- Genus: Pulchrana
- Species: P. siberu

Binomial name
- Pulchrana siberu (Dring, McCarthy, and Whitten, 1990)

Synonyms
- Rana siberu Dring, McCarthy, and Whitten, 1990; Hylarana siberu (Dring, McCarthy, and Whitten, 1990)

= Pulchrana siberu =

Species of amphibian

Pulchrana siberu, also known as the Siberut Island frog, is a species of true frog, family Ranidae. It is found in the Mentawai Islands, off the Sumatran west coast (Indonesia), including the eponymous Siberut Island. It possibly occurs in Sumatra itself, although the latter records seem to refer to an as-yet-undescribed species. Similarly, earlier records from Malaysia refer to Pulchrana centropeninsularis.

It resembles the Pulchrana picturata, but can be distinguished by its continuous dorsolateral stripe, an immaculate dorsum without spots and the males lack nuptial pads.

Pulchrana siberu occurs in primary and secondary lowland forests at elevations below 700 m (2,300 ft) in association with swamp and peat bog habitats. Breeding takes place in streams. It is threatened by habitat loss, which is primarily caused by expanding oil palm plantations.
