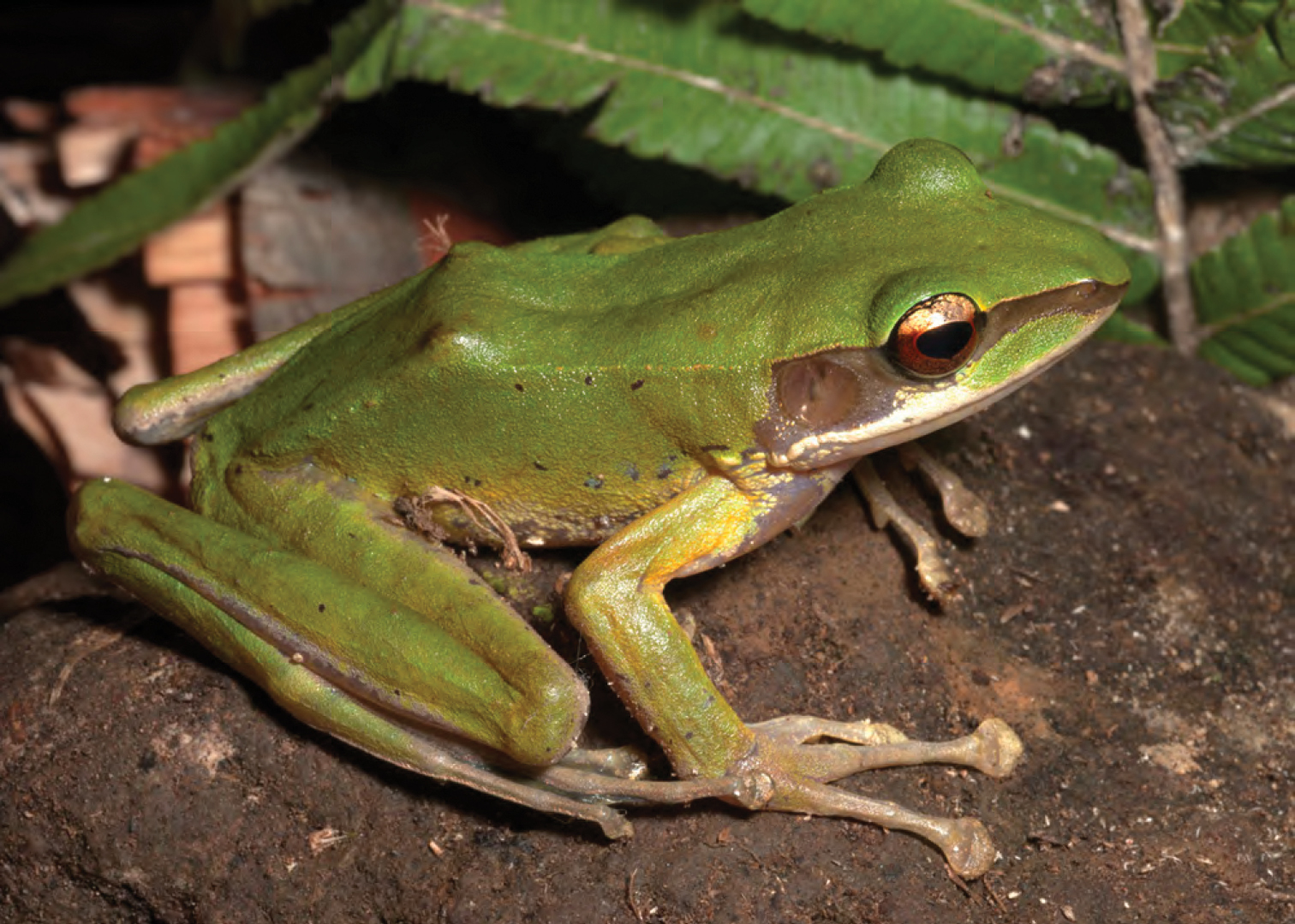

Conservation status
- Least Concern (IUCN 3.1)

Scientific classification
- Kingdom: Animalia
- Phylum: Chordata
- Class: Amphibia
- Order: Anura
- Family: Ranidae
- Genus: Sanguirana
- Species: S. luzonensis

Binomial name
- Sanguirana luzonensis (Boulenger, 1896)

Synonyms
- Rana luzonensis Boulenger, 1896; Rana guerreroi Taylor, 1920; Rana tafti Taylor, 1922; Hydrophylax luzonensis (Boulenger, 1896); Hylarana luzonensis (Boulenger, 1896)

= Sanguirana luzonensis =

Species of amphibian

Sanguirana luzonensis, also known as the Luzon frog, is a species of true frog, family Ranidae. It is endemic to the island of Luzon (including some associated islands), the Philippines. It occurs in swift-flowing, cool mountain streams and rivers in montane rainforest at elevations up to 2,000 m (6,600 ft). It is very common in many habitats, although it is suspected to be declining because of habitat loss and deterioration.
