= Striped stream frog =

Striped stream frog refers to two frog species:

- Hylarana signata, a true frog species from Southeast Asia.
- Strongylopus fasciatus, a true frog species from Africa.
