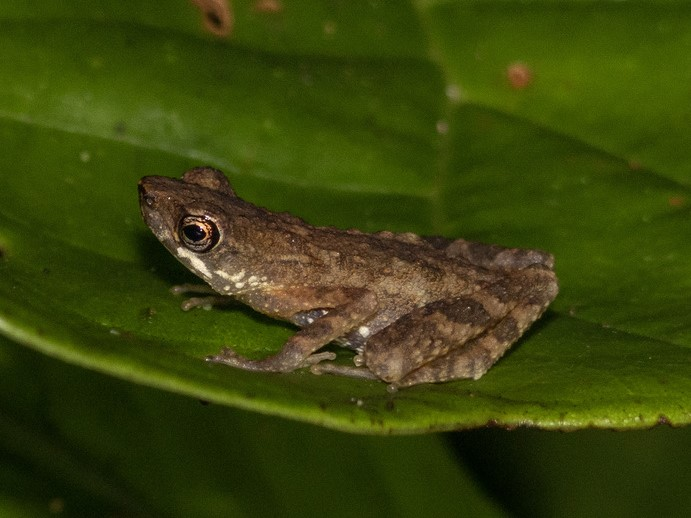

Conservation status
- Near Threatened (IUCN 3.1)

Scientific classification
- Kingdom: Animalia
- Phylum: Chordata
- Class: Amphibia
- Order: Anura
- Family: Bufonidae
- Genus: Ansonia
- Species: A. platysoma

Binomial name
- Ansonia platysoma Inger, 1960

= Ansonia platysoma =

Species of amphibian

Ansonia platysoma, also known as the flat-bodied slender toad and Luidan stream toad, is a species of toad in the family Bufonidae. It is endemic to the island of Borneo and known from Sabah and Sarawak, Malaysia, and from Brunei. Its closest relative is Ansonia kelabitensis.

== Description ==
Adult males measure 21–23 mm (0.8–0.9 in) and adult females 22–28 mm (0.9–1.1 in) in snout–vent length. The overall appearance is slender. The head and the body are conspicuously depressed. The head is wider than it is long. The snout is obtusely pointed and strongly projecting. The tympanum is distinct. The fingers are slender and have weakly developed terminal discs and rudimentary webbing. The toes are webbed and have small rounded disks at their tips. The dorsum has a brown to olive ground colour. The warts on the back are rather smooth.

== Habitat and conservation ==
Adult Ansonia platysoma occur on the floor of montane forests at elevations between 600 and 1,600 m (2,000 and 5,200 ft) above sea level. They breed in clear, rocky mountain creeks. Males call from vegetation in or along the streams, and the tadpoles live in torrents of these streams, where they cling to rocks and presumably feed on lithophytes.

Ansonia platysoma is locally abundant. It does not appear to adapt to habitat modification, but the known populations are within well-protected areas: the Crocker Range and Kinabalu National Parks in Sabah, and the Gunung Mulu National Park in Sarawak.
