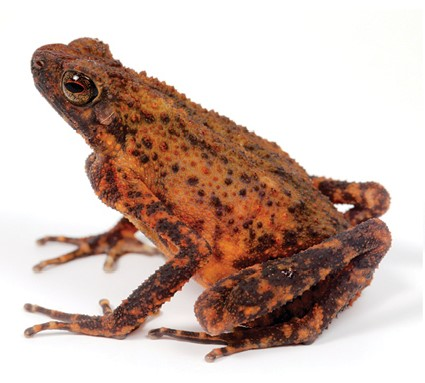

Conservation status
- Least Concern (IUCN 3.1)

Scientific classification
- Kingdom: Animalia
- Phylum: Chordata
- Class: Amphibia
- Order: Anura
- Family: Bufonidae
- Genus: Ansonia
- Species: A. longidigita

Binomial name
- Ansonia longidigita Inger, 1960

= Ansonia longidigita =

Species of amphibian

Ansonia longidigita (common names: long-fingered slender toad, long-fingered stream toad) is a species of toad in the family Bufonidae. It is endemic to northern and western Borneo in Sabah and Sarawak (Malaysia) and in Brunei.

== Description ==
The specific name longidigita means "long-fingered" and refers to the long and slender fingers of the species. Males measure 40–50 mm (1.6–2.0 in) whereas females can grow to 70 mm (2.8 in) in snout–vent length. It has a slender habitus. The tympanum is distinct. Dorsal skin has numerous small, round warts.

Tadpoles are very small, commonly less than 15 mm (0.59 in) in length. They have dark blotches on cream background colour.

== Habitat and conservation ==
Ansonia longidigita is a common toad inhabiting mid-elevation hills. Adults live on the forest floor or low in the vegetation. They breed in small, clear brooks and streams with rocky bottoms. Males call from the stream boulders or from vegetation by the stream.

The species is threatened by habitat loss caused by logging, and the siltation of streams that logging leads to.
