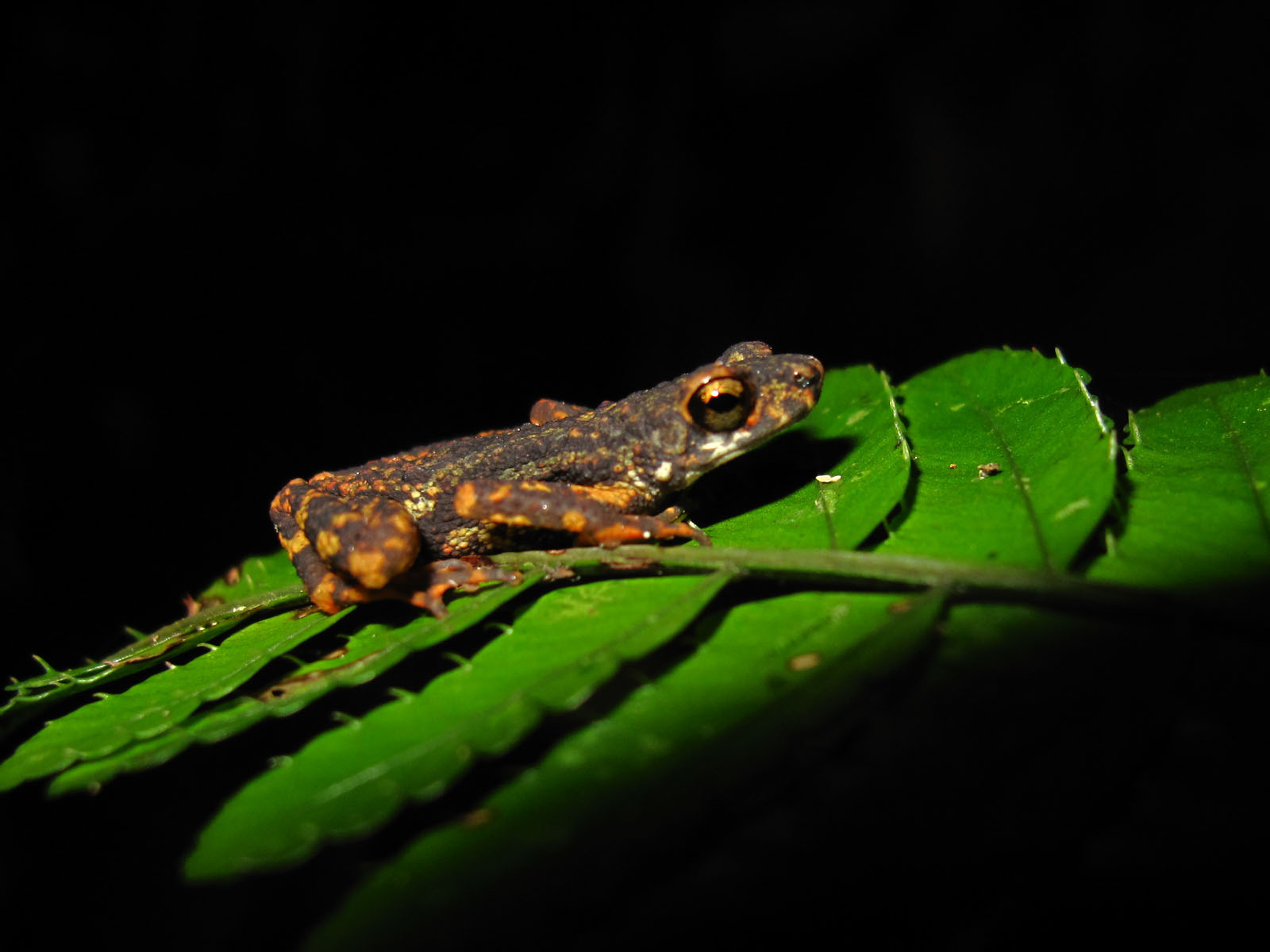

Conservation status
- Least Concern (IUCN 3.1)

Scientific classification
- Kingdom: Animalia
- Phylum: Chordata
- Class: Amphibia
- Order: Anura
- Family: Bufonidae
- Genus: Ansonia
- Species: A. kraensis

Binomial name
- Ansonia kraensis Matsui, Khonsue, and Nabhitabhata, 2005

= Ansonia kraensis =

Species of amphibian

Ansonia kraensis (Kra stream toad) is a species of toads in the family Bufonidae. It is found on the Kra Isthmus, Thailand. It is morphologically similar to Ansonia malayana from Malaysia, but differs from it in ventral coloration and larval morphology. The exact threats are unknown but are likely forest loss for logging and agricultural expansion.

== Description ==
Ansonia kraensis males measure 20–22 mm (0.79–0.87 in) and females 24–28 mm (0.94–1.10 in) in snout–vent length. Tympanum is visible. Dorsum is brown with darker markings, and has small and minute warts, some of them with orange-yellow tips. Limbs have orange-yellow crossbars. Tadpoles are up to 23 mm (0.91 in) in length. Their body is flattened, dorsally black with two transverse light bands, and ventrally unpigmented. Oral disc is large.

== Habitat ==
Ansonia kraensis is a forest species found near streams, sometimes also near seepages some distance away from streams. Tadpoles have been found in a small stream with moderate flow, clinging to the rocks.
