= Ansonia jeetsukumarani =

Conservation status
- Vulnerable (IUCN 3.1)

Scientific classification
- Kingdom: Animalia
- Phylum: Chordata
- Class: Amphibia
- Order: Anura
- Family: Bufonidae
- Genus: Ansonia
- Species: A. jeetsukumarani

Binomial name
- Ansonia jeetsukumarani Wood, Grismer, Ahmad, and Senawi, 2008

Species of amphibian

Ansonia jeetsukumarani (common name: Jeet Sukumaran's torrent-dwelling toad) is a species of toads in the family Bufonidae. It is endemic to Peninsular Malaysia and known from its type locality, Fraser's Hill (Pahang state), and from Sungai Pergau (Kelantan state). It is named in honour of Jeet Sukumaran, a biologist who has worked with Malaysian amphibians.

== Description ==
Ansonia jeetsukumarani is a relatively small species: two males measured 19–20 mm (0.75–0.79 in) and three females about 25 mm (0.98 in) in snout–vent length. The body is stout but relatively flat; the head and limbs are slender. The tympanum is large. There is a small, white wart at angle of jaw. The dorsum is smooth with scattered, small tubercles. The tubercles are more prominent on flanks. The ventral surface is finely granular. The dorsum is nearly uniform brown but has an orangish-yellow interscapular spot and a thin, faint vertebral stripe. The tubercles on dorsum and flanks are reddish-orange. The arms and legs are orangish and slightly barred. The hands and feet bear orange and brown bars. The venter is dark, with whitish-yellow spots towards the flanks and extending from hind limb insertions to cover gular region and mandible. The undersides of hind limbs are brownish-red in females but brown in males. The iris is reddish-orange and has a black, reticulated pattern.

== Habitat and conservation ==
The species inhabits hilly, closed canopy forests at elevations of 1,059–1,125 m (3,474–3,691 ft) above sea level. Individuals have been found at night on rocks and small leaves about 0.5–1.5 m above the ground near small streams, its presumed breeding habitat (no tadpoles or calling males are known).

Possible threats are habitat fragmentation and warming of the climate.
