= Sanguirana mearnsi =

Conservation status
- Least Concern (IUCN 3.1)

Scientific classification
- Kingdom: Animalia
- Phylum: Chordata
- Class: Amphibia
- Order: Anura
- Family: Ranidae
- Genus: Sanguirana
- Species: S. mearnsi

Binomial name
- Sanguirana mearnsi (Stejneger, 1905)

Synonyms
- Rana mearnsi Stejneger, 1905; Rana dubita Taylor, 1920; Rana everetti ssp. albotuberculata Inger, 1954; Rana albotuberculata Brown, McGuire, and Diesmos, 2000; Hydrophylax albotuberculata Frost et al., 2006; Hylarana albotuberculata Che et al., 2007; Chalcorana albotuberculata Fei, Ye, and Jiang, 2010; Sanguirana albotuberculata Fuiten et al., 2011

Species of amphibian

Sanguirana mearnsi, commonly called the Mindanao torrent frog or Cabilian frog (as synonym Sanguirana albotuberculata) is a species of frog in the family Ranidae. It is endemic to the islands of Leyte, Samar, and Mindanao in the Philippines. It inhabits streams and rivers between 100 – 1100 metres above sea level. It is threatened by habitat loss through deforestation and habitat conversion to agriculture as well as by the pollution due to agricultural run-off and mining operations.
