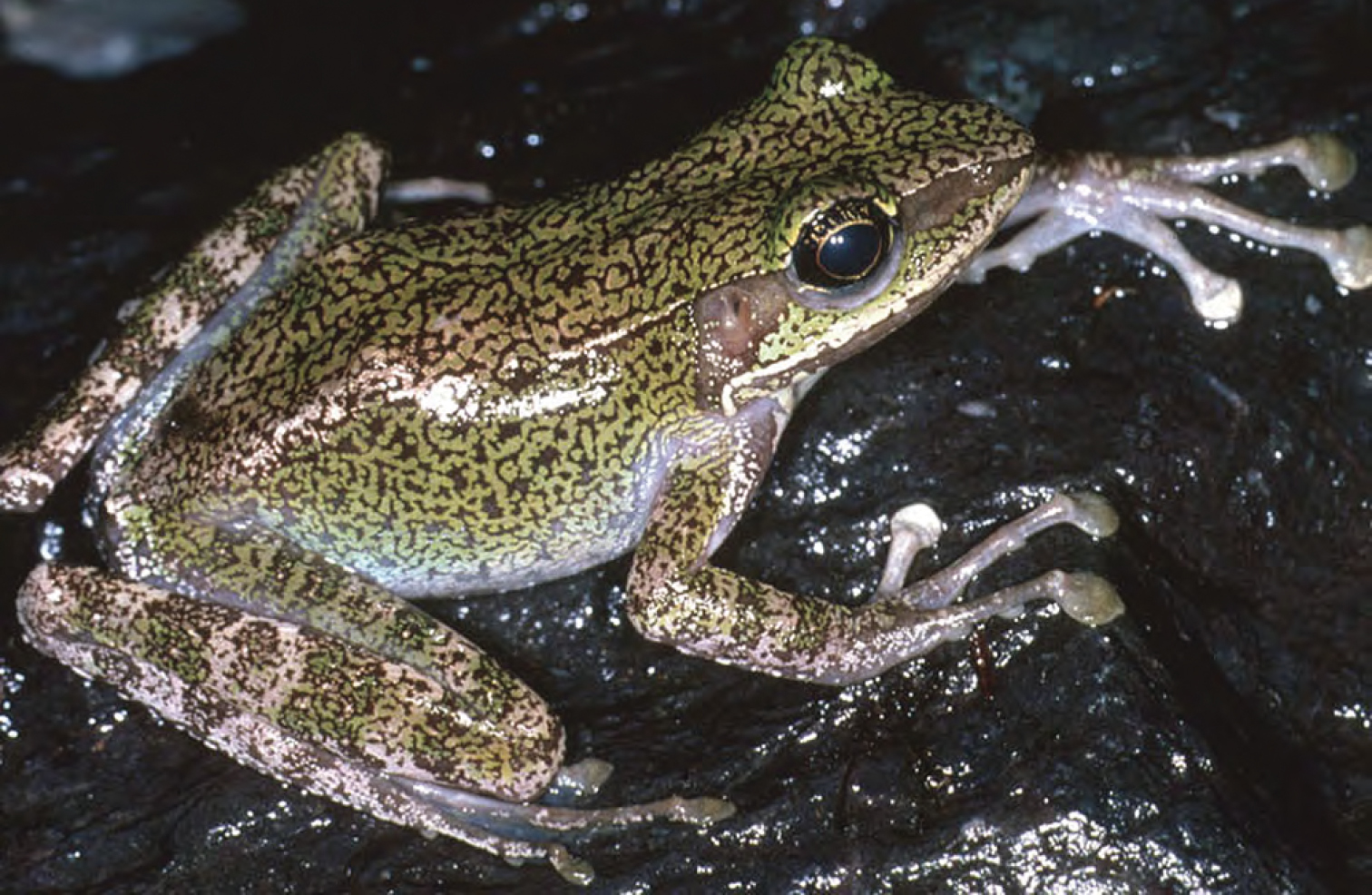

Conservation status
- Vulnerable (IUCN 3.1)

Scientific classification
- Kingdom: Animalia
- Phylum: Chordata
- Class: Amphibia
- Order: Anura
- Family: Ranidae
- Genus: Sanguirana
- Species: S. tipanan

Binomial name
- Sanguirana tipanan (Brown, McGuire and Diesmos, 2000)

Synonyms
- Rana tipanan Brown, McGuire and Diesmos, 2000; Hylarana tipanan (Brown, McGuire and Diesmos, 2000)

= Sanguirana tipanan =

Species of amphibian

Sanguirana tipanan is a species of true frog. It is native to the Sierra Madre mountains of the island of Luzon, Philippines. It inhabits cool streams and rivers in lower montane and lowland forests. It is threatened by logging and habitat loss.
