= Stream tree frog =

Stream tree frog may refer to:

- Mountain stream tree frog (Litoria barringtonensis), a frog in the family Hylidae native to New South Wales, Australia
- Prince Charles stream tree frog (Hyloscirtus princecharlesi), a frog in the family Hylidae found in Ecuador
- Río Negro stream tree frog (Hyloscirtus tolkieni) a frog in the family Hylidae found in ecuador
