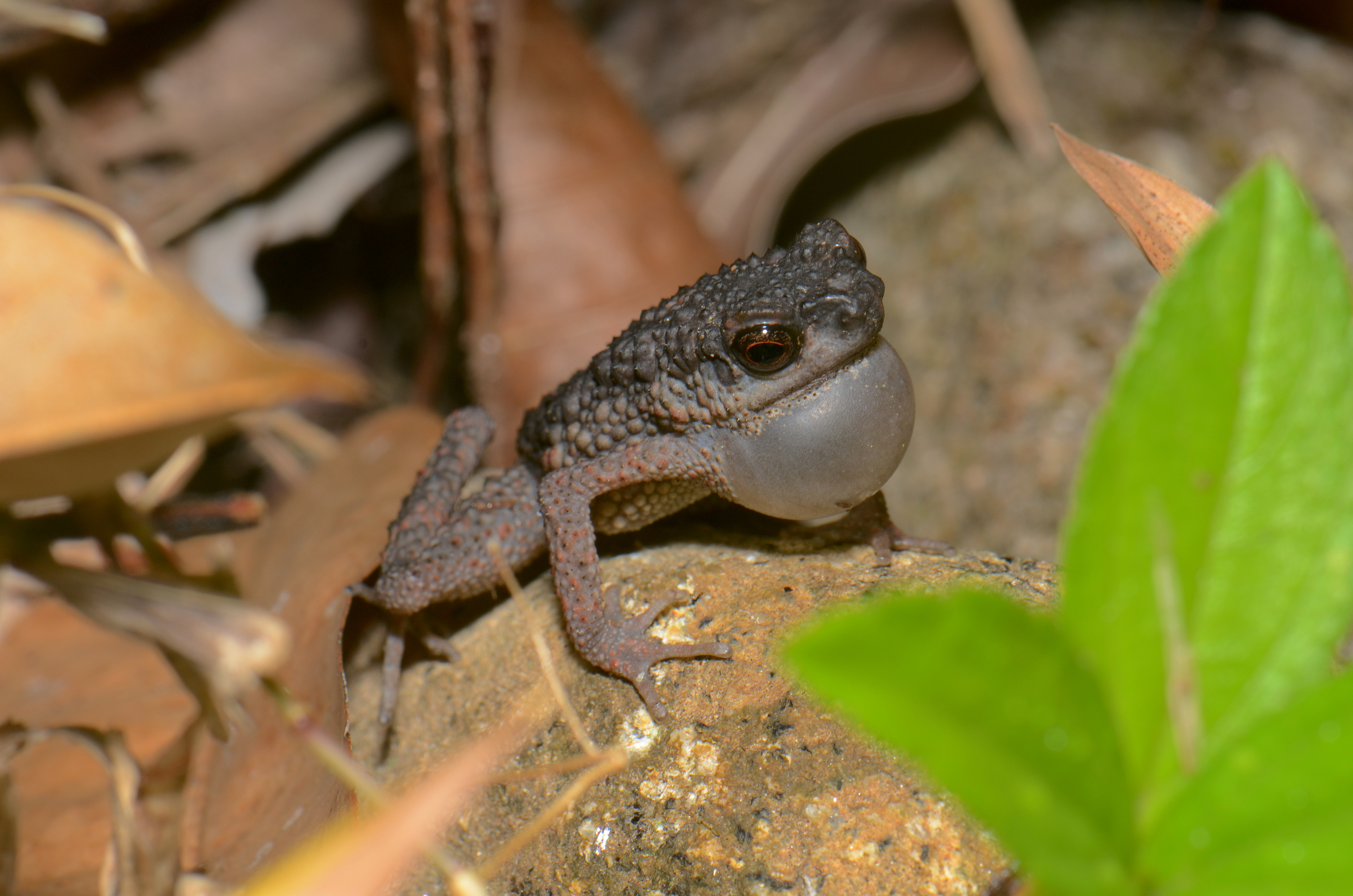

Conservation status
- Least Concern (IUCN 3.1)

Scientific classification
- Kingdom: Animalia
- Phylum: Chordata
- Class: Amphibia
- Order: Anura
- Family: Bufonidae
- Genus: Ansonia
- Species: A. spinulifer

Binomial name
- Ansonia spinulifer (Mocquard, 1890)

Synonyms
- Bufo spinulifer Mocquard, 1890

= Ansonia spinulifer =

Species of amphibian

Ansonia spinulifer, also known as spiny slender toad or Kina Balu stream toad, is a species of true toad in the family Bufonidae. It is found in Sarawak and Sabah, northern Borneo (Malaysia), and presumably also in Kalimantan on the Indonesian part of the island.

== Description ==
Ansonia spinulifer males measure 30–40 mm (1.2–1.6 in) and females up to 45 mm (1.8 in) in snout–vent length. Tympanum is visible. Dorsum has big spinose warts and usually a light spot between the shoulders. The warts are large and have keratinized projections, hence the species name. Tadpoles have the typical sucker mouth of rheophilous Ansonia tadpoles.

== Habitat and conservation ==
Its natural habitats are lowland rainforests at elevations of 150–750 m (490–2,460 ft) asl. Adults range widely over the floor and herb stratum in areas of steep terrain, but breeding requires small, clear, rocky-bottomed streams. Males call at night, sitting in low vegetation close to streams. The tadpoles live in torrents; they cling to rocks and feed on lithophytes.

Ansonia spinulifer is common in Sarawak, but it seems not to adapt to habitat modification. It is threatened by habitat loss (deforestation and the associated siltation of streams; plantations).

== Breeding habits ==
During breeding season, male Ansonia Spinulifer attract females by sitting and producing calls from low vegetation at night. Based on the species' stream-dwelling tadpoles and habits of the congener, reproduction occurs near a stream.
