= Alexander Haas =

German biologist and herpetologist

- Born: 1964 (age 61–62); Heilbronn, Germany
- Education: University of Tübingen; University of California, Berkeley; Friedrich Schiller University Jena
- Known for: Herpetology and amphibian biodiversity
- Scientific career
- Fields: Biology, herpetology
- Workplaces: University of Hamburg, Leibniz Institute for the Analysis of Biodiversity Change Hamburg

Alexander Haas (born 1964 in Heilbronn) is a German biologist and has been a professor at the University of Hamburg since 2003.

Haas heads the herpetology section at the Leibniz Institute for the Analysis of Biodiversity Change. Before his appointment in Hamburg, he studied at the University of Tübingen, spent a year at the University of California, Berkeley in California, and spent nine years at the Friedrich Schiller University Jena.

Together with his colleague Professor Indraneil Das of Malaysia, Haas has conducted an inventory of frog species and tadpoles in the Malaysian states of Sarawak and Sabah on the island of Borneo since 2004. The research project, Inventory and Biodiversity of the Frog Fauna of East Malaysia with emphasis on their larval forms, was supported by the Volkswagen Foundation.

In the context of biodiversity conservation, Haas advocates foundational work in taxonomy, arguing that such work is necessary for the rapid documentation of biodiversity.
