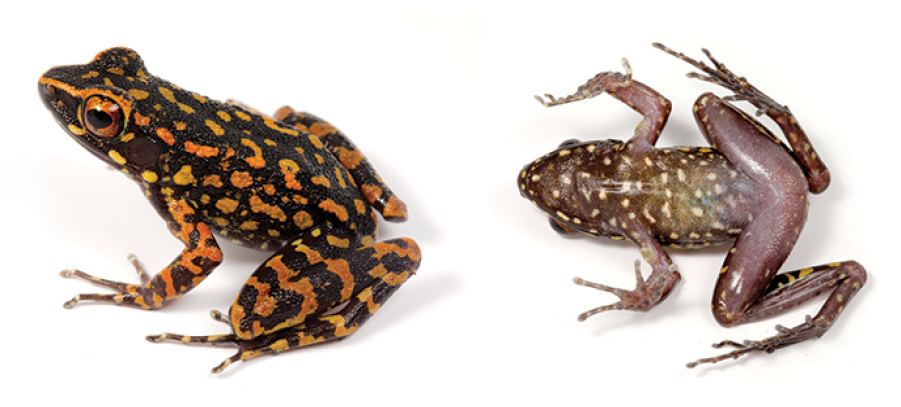
- Pulchrana picturata

Conservation status
- Least Concern (IUCN 3.1)

Scientific classification
- Kingdom: Animalia
- Phylum: Chordata
- Class: Amphibia
- Order: Anura
- Family: Ranidae
- Genus: Pulchrana
- Species: P. picturata

Binomial name
- Pulchrana picturata (Boulenger, 1920)

Synonyms
- Rana picturata Boulenger, 1920; Hylarana picturata (Boulenger, 1920)

= Pulchrana picturata =

Species of amphibian

Pulchrana picturata, also known as the spotted stream frog, is a species of frog in the family Ranidae. It is endemic to Borneo (Brunei, Indonesia, and Malaysia).

Pulchrana picturata (in the broad sense, including populations from the Malay Peninsula and Sumatra now assigned to Pulchrana sundabarat) is a riparian species that inhabits lowland forests where they can be found along streams or small rivers. Males are usually heard calling from stream banks, within root tangles, rock overhangs or crevices or perched on low vegetation, rocks, logs or broken branches.
