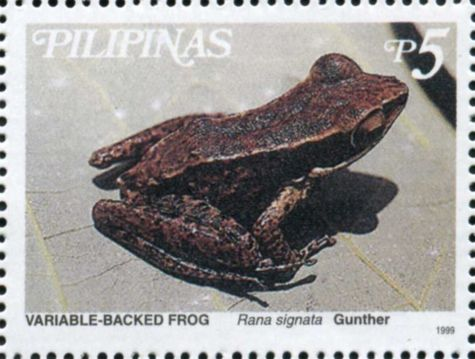

Conservation status
- Least Concern (IUCN 3.1)

Scientific classification
- Kingdom: Animalia
- Phylum: Chordata
- Class: Amphibia
- Order: Anura
- Family: Ranidae
- Genus: Pulchrana
- Species: P. signata

Binomial name
- Pulchrana signata (Günther, 1872)

Synonyms
- Polypedates signatus Günther, 1872; Rana signata Boulenger, 1882; Hylarana signata (Günther, 1872)

= Pulchrana signata =

Striped stream frog

Species of amphibian

" Pulchrana signata, commonly known as the variable-backed frog, striped stream frog, spotted stream frog, or Matang frog, is a species of "true frog" (family Ranidae). It is native to the Malay Peninsula (Thailand and Peninsular Malaysia), Sumatra and Natuna Archipelago (Indonesia), and Borneo (Malaysia, Brunei Darussalam, Indonesia). Its occurs in lowland tropical forests, including swamp and heath forests, a altitudes up to 700 m (2,300 ft) above sea level. It is not currently considered threatened by the IUCN.
