= Wart frog =

Wart frog may refer to:

- African wart frog, a brightly colored frog
- Amboina wart frog, a frog found in Sulawesi, Molucca Islands, and New Guinea
- Andaman wart frog, a frog endemic to the Andaman Islands, India
- Annam wart frog, a frog found in Cambodia and Vietnam
- Boie's wart frog, a South Asian frog with half-webbed toes
- Bombay wart frog, a frog native to India, Sri Lanka, Pakistan, Nepal and Bangladesh
- Burmese wart frog, a terrestrial frog found in primary tropical forest
- Dammerman's wart frog, a frog endemic to the Lesser Sunda Islands, India
- Finch's wart frog, a frog endemic to Sabah, Malaysia
- Fragile wart frog, a frog endemic to Hainan Island, China
- Ghats wart frog, a frog endemic to the Western Ghats, India
- Inger's wart frog, a frog found in Borneo
- Kerala wart frog, a frog from India
- Koh Chang wart frog, a frog found in Cambodia, Laos, Thailand, and Vietnam
- Luzon wart frog, a frog endemic to the Philippines
- Malabar wart frog, a frog endemic to the Western Ghats, India
- Malaya wart frog, a frog endemic to Sumatra and Java, Indonesia
- Mysore wart frog, a frog endemic to the Western Ghats, India
- Nilgiris wart frog, a frog endemic to the Western Ghats, India
- Parambikulam wart frog, a frog endemic to the Western Ghats, India
- Pegu wart frog, a frog endemic to the Western Ghats, India
- Pierre's wart frog, a frog associated with paddy fields
- Sri Lanka wart frog, a frog endemic to Sri Lanka
- Sulawesi wart frog, a frog endemic to Sulawesi, Indonesia
- Sundas wart frog, a frog found in the Lesser Sunda Islands of Indonesia and East Timor
- Tagibo wart frog, a frog endemic to the Philippines
- Tanah Rata wart frog, a frog endemic to Peninsular Malaysia
- Terai wart frog, a frog associated with open grasslands
- Timor wart frog, a frog endemic to the island of Timor
- Tweedie's wart frog, a frog found in Sumatra and the Malay Peninsula
