= River frog (disambiguation) =

The river frog is a species of aquatic frog in the family Ranidae.

River frog may also refer to:

== Frogs ==
- African river frog (Phrynobatrachus), a genus of frogs that form the monogeneric family Phrynobatrachidae found in Sub-Saharan Africa
- Blyth's river frog (Limnonectes blythii), a frog in the family Dicroglossidae found from Myanmar through western Thailand and the Malay Peninsula (Malaysia, Singapore) to Sumatra and Borneo (Indonesia)
- Giant river frog (Limnonectes leporinus), a frog in the family Dicroglossidae endemic to Borneo found in Brunei, Kalimantan (Indonesia), and Sabah and Sarawak (Malaysia)
- Malaysian river frog (Limnonectes malesianus), a frog in the family Dicroglossidae found on the Malay Peninsula (including extreme southern peninsular Thailand and Singapore), Sumatra, Java, Borneo (Indonesia, Malaysia), and a range of islands on the Sunda Shelf
- River frog (Brazil) (Thoropa), a genus of frogs in the family Cycloramphidae from eastern and southeastern Brazil
- River frog (Cacosterninae) (Amietia), a genus of frogs in the family Pyxicephalidae, endemic to central and southern Africa
- Rocky river frog (Arthroleptides), a genus of frogs in the family Petropedetidae found in the mountains of East Africa (Tanzania, Kenya, and probably Uganda)
- Spencer's river tree frog (Litoria spenceri), a frog in the family Hylidae endemic to Australia
- Timor river frog (Limnonectes timorensis), a frog in the family Dicroglossidae endemic to the island of Timor

== Other ==
- Louisville RiverFrogs, a former professional ice hockey team based in Louisville, Kentucky, 1995–1998
  - Rowdy River Frog, the mascot of the Louisville RiverFrogs
