= Swamp frog (disambiguation) =

The swamp frog is a genus of leptodactylid frogs from South America.

Swamp frog may also refer to:

- African swamp frog, a frog found in Africa
- Australian swamp frog, a frog native to Australia, New Guinea, and some Torres Strait Islands
- Greater swamp frog, a frog found in Borneo
- Green and golden swamp frog, a frog native to eastern Australia
- Large swamp frog, a frog endemic to the Philippines
- Lesser swamp frog, a frog found in Thailand, Malaysia, and Singapore
- New England swamp frog, a frog endemic to southeastern Australia
- Peat swamp frog, a frog found in Indonesia, Malaysia, Singapore, and Thailand
- Sacred swamp wrinkled frog, a frog endemic to the Western Ghats, India
- Warty swamp frog, a frog native to Australia
