= Mindanao frog =

Mindanao frog may refer to:

- Eastern Mindanao frog (Limnonectes diuatus), a frog in the family Dicroglossidae endemic to the Philippines
- Mindanao fanged frog (Limnonectes magnus), a frog in the family Dicroglossidae endemic to the Philippines
- Mindanao horned frog (Megophrys stejnegeri) a frog in the family Megophryidae endemic to the island of Mindanao in the Philippines
