= Limnonectes lauhachindai =

Conservation status
- Vulnerable (IUCN 3.1)

Scientific classification
- Kingdom: Animalia
- Phylum: Chordata
- Class: Amphibia
- Order: Anura
- Family: Dicroglossidae
- Genus: Limnonectes
- Species: L. lauhachindai

Binomial name
- Limnonectes lauhachindai Aowphol, Rujirawan, Taksinum, Chuaynkern, and Stuart, 2015

Species of frog

Limnonectes lauhachindai, also known as Lauhachinda's fanged frog, is a species of frog in the family Dicroglossidae. As currently known, it is endemic to Ubon Ratchathani Province, Thailand, where it has been recorded from Na Chaluai and Sirindhorn Districts. However, its true range is expected to be wider, also extending into adjacent Laos and Cambodia. It is the sister taxon of Limnonectes dabanus and Limnonectes gyldenstolpei. It is one of the five caruncle-bearing Limnonectes species.

== Etymology ==
The specific name lauhachindai honours Virayuth Lauhachinda from the Kasetsart University, "in recognition of his contributions to herpetology in Thailand".

== Description ==
Adult males measure 31–42 mm (1.2–1.7 in) and adult females 33–38 mm (1.3–1.5 in) in snout–vent length. The overall appearance is moderately stocky. The head is broad (more so in males than in females) and depressed. The snout is obtusely pointed in dorsal view and round in lateral profile, projecting well beyond the lower jaw. The tympanum is round and not very distinct. The fingers are moderately slender and have tips with weakly expanded discs; webbing is not present. The toes are partially webbed, slender, and bear small discs. Males have a U-shaped caruncle with a free posterior edge between the eyes; this is absent in females. The dorsum is brown with irregular black spots, becoming brassy on the dorsal surfaces of limbs and upper flanks. A continuous black streak runs under the canthus and supratympanic fold, extending from the nostril to upper half of the tympanum. The lips are brown with broad black bars. The iris is bronze. Some specimens (about 28%, including the holotype) have a broad, cream-yellow vertebral stripe that runs from the anterior margin of the upper jaw to the vent. The upper surfaces of the hindlimbs have broad black bands. The lower flanks are beige and gray.

Males have two types of advertisement calls, one consisting of about five (range: 1–10) one-pulsed notes with a dominant frequency of 1.12–2.33 kHz, and the other consisting of a single, multi-pulsed note with a dominant frequency of 2.15–2.24 kHz.

== Habitat and conservation ==
Limnonectes lauhachindai occurs near streams and on the ground in lowland tropical dry dipterocarp and semi-evergreen forests at elevations of 131–360 m (430–1,181 ft) above sea level. The tadpoles probably live in streams or ponds, as in its close relatives.

This species is likely to be threatened by hydroelectric dams and deforestation caused by agricultural expansion. Some related species are exploited for consumption or trade, and this might also occur for this species. However, these threats are ameliorated in protected areas; Limnonectes lauhachindai is present in the Phu Chong–Na Yoi National Park and likely to be present several other protected areas.
