= Limnonectes quangninhensis =

Scientific classification
- Kingdom: Animalia
- Phylum: Chordata
- Class: Amphibia
- Order: Anura
- Family: Dicroglossidae
- Genus: Limnonectes
- Species: L. quangninhensis

Binomial name
- Limnonectes quangninhensis Pham, Le, Nguyen, Ziegler, Wu, and Nguyen, 2017

Species of amphibian

Limnonectes quangninhensis (Quangninh Wart Frog; Vietnamese: Ếch nhẽo Quảng Ninh) is a species of fanged frog in the family Dicroglossidae. Its type locality is Quảng Sơn Commune, Hải Hà District, Quảng Ninh Province, Vietnam, where it was found in an evergreen forest near Tai Chi Village (21°31.785’N, 107°38.965’E, 195 meters above sea level). It is found in islands of the Gulf of Tonkin, and is also likely found across the border in Fangchenggang, Guangxi, China. It is a sister taxon to Limnonectes fujianensis.
