= Limnonectes deinodon =

Scientific classification
- Domain: Eukaryota
- Kingdom: Animalia
- Phylum: Chordata
- Class: Amphibia
- Order: Anura
- Family: Dicroglossidae
- Genus: Limnonectes
- Species: L. deinodon

Binomial name
- Limnonectes deinodon Dehling, 2014

Species of amphibian

Limnonectes deinodon is a species of fanged frogs in the family Dicroglossidae. It is endemic to peninsular Malaysia and likely also southern Thailand. It was previously confused with Limnonectes laticeps and Limnonectes khasianus.
