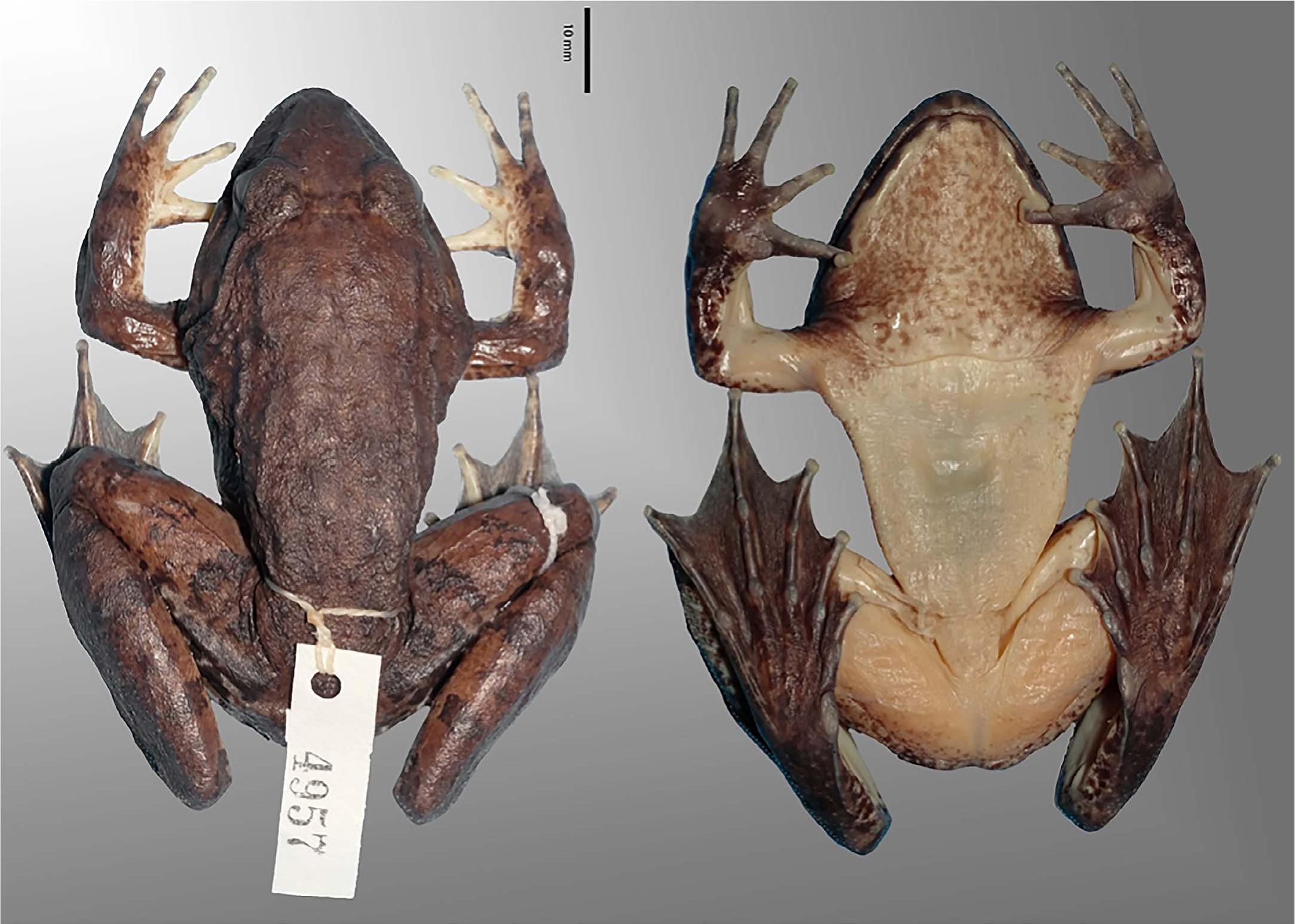
- Holotype, an adult male

Scientific classification
- Kingdom: Animalia
- Phylum: Chordata
- Class: Amphibia
- Order: Anura
- Family: Dicroglossidae
- Genus: Limnonectes
- Species: L. beloncioi

Binomial name
- Limnonectes beloncioi Herr, Vallejos, Meneses, Abraham, Otterholt, Siler, Rico, and Brown, 2021

= Limnonectes beloncioi =

Species of amphibian

Limnonectes beloncioi, also known as the Mindoro fanged frog, is a species of frog in the family Dicroglossidae. It is endemic to the Philippines and currently known from Mindoro and Semirara Islands. It is morphologically similar, previously confused with, and closely related to Limnonectes acanthi. The actual range of L. beloncioi could be wider but the status of similar frogs beyond Mindoro and Semirara requires further study.

== Description ==
Adult males measure 54–83 mm (2.1–3.3 in) and adult females 55–80 mm (2.2–3.1 in) in snout–vent length. The overall appearance is robust. The head is wider than the body. The snout is rounded. The tympanum is visible and the supratympanic fold is thick. The fingers have weakly developed lateral dermal flanges but no webbing. The finger tips bear small discs that are not wider than the tips. The toes are fully webbed and bear discs that are slightly expanded. Skin is smooth to slightly shagreened. There are several dorsolateral tubercular ridges. The dorsal coloration is variable, with three main types: (1) very dark brown to black; markings indistinct or barely evident, (2) medium brown to gray, with evident darker transverse hindlimb bars, forearm blotches, interorbital bar, and labial bars, (3) light gray, with a dense network or reticulum of dark gray, densely congregated into hindlimb bars, forearm blotches, a darkly pigmented interorbital bar, and labial bars. The ventral body surfaces are generally white, becoming more yellowish white posteriorly.

== Habitat and conservation ==
Limnonectes beloncioi is a common species in riparian habitats and in the vicinity of moving water in gallery forests. It has been found from coastal lowland habitats just above sea level to low and mid-elevation forests in the interior of Mindoro, up to at least 830 m (2,720 ft) above sea level.

As of late 2022, this species has not been evaluated for the IUCN Red List of Threatened Species. Herr and colleagues suggest that it could be classified as a "least-concern species". It is one of the most common frogs in Mindoro and persists in heavily disturbed and highly degraded riparian habitats; forest loss should still be considered a threat. It is also heavily hunted for human consumption. The tadpoles appear to tolerate poor water quality.
