= Luzon frog (disambiguation) =

The Luzon frog (Hylarana luzonensis) is a species of true frog in the family Ranidae endemic to the island of Luzon in the Philippines.

Luzon frog may also refer to:

- Luzon fanged frog (Limnonectes macrocephalus), a frog in the family Dicroglossidae endemic to the Philippines
- Luzon narrow-mouthed frog (Kaloula rigida), a frog in the family Microhylidae endemic to the Philippines
- Luzon wart frog (Fejervarya vittigera), a frog in the family Dicroglossidae endemic to the Philippines
