= Limnonectes poilani =

Conservation status
- Least Concern (IUCN 3.1)

Scientific classification
- Kingdom: Animalia
- Phylum: Chordata
- Class: Amphibia
- Order: Anura
- Family: Dicroglossidae
- Genus: Limnonectes
- Species: L. poilani

Binomial name
- Limnonectes poilani (Bourret, 1942)

Synonyms
- Rana kohchangae poilani Bourret, 1942

Species of frog

Limnonectes poilani is a species of frog in the family Dicroglossidae from eastern Cambodia and southern Vietnam. It was originally described as a subspecies of Limnonectes kohchangae with whom it has been confused.

Limnonectes poilani is an uncommon species found in upland forests. It is not considered threatened by the IUCN.
