= Limnonectes nguyenorum =

Scientific classification
- Domain: Eukaryota
- Kingdom: Animalia
- Phylum: Chordata
- Class: Amphibia
- Order: Anura
- Family: Dicroglossidae
- Genus: Limnonectes
- Species: L. nguyenorum

Binomial name
- Limnonectes nguyenorum McLeod, Kurlbaum, and Hoang, 2015

Species of amphibian

Limnonectes nguyenorum is a species of fanged frog in the family Dicroglossidae. It is endemic to northern Vietnam and only known from the area of its type locality in Vi Xuyen District, northwestern Ha Giang Province, northern Vietnam. It is part of the Limnonectes kuhlii species complex.

== Description ==
Limnonectes nguyenorum is a relatively small-sized species within the Limnonectes kuhlii group: in the type series consisting of two adult males and two adult females, the males measure about 44 mm (1.7 in) and the females 37 and 43 mm (1.5 and 1.7 in) in snout–vent length. Males have fang-like odontoid processes on the lower jaw. The overall appearance is slender, with the head slightly enlarged. The tympanum is hidden and the supratympanic fold is indistinct. The finger and toe tips are rounded but not expanded into discs. The fingers have no webbing whereas the toes are fully webbed. Preserved specimens have light brown dorsum with some dark brown marking and blotches. A prominent white bar extends from the nares to the arm insertion. The upper lip has distinct white spots and dark brown bars. The throat is mottled and venter is immaculate.

== Habitat and conservation ==
Limnonectes nguyenorum occurs along streams in submontane evergreen forests at elevations of about 600–900 m (2,000–3,000 ft) above sea level. It occurs in sympatry with Limnonectes bannaensis.

As of May 2018, this species has not been included the IUCN Red List of Threatened Species.
