= Limnonectes kenepaiensis =

Conservation status
- Vulnerable (IUCN 3.1)

Scientific classification
- Kingdom: Animalia
- Phylum: Chordata
- Class: Amphibia
- Order: Anura
- Family: Dicroglossidae
- Genus: Limnonectes
- Species: L. kenepaiensis

Binomial name
- Limnonectes kenepaiensis (Inger, 1966)

Synonyms
- Rana paramacrodon kenepaiensis Inger, 1966

Species of frog

Limnonectes kenepaiensis is a species of frog in the family Dicroglossidae. It is endemic to western Borneo and occurs in both Kalimantan (Indonesia) and Sarawak (Malaysia), and perhaps in Sabah (Malaysia). Common name Kenepai wart frog has been coined for it. It was first described as subspecies of Limnonectes paramacrodon, which it resembles.

== Description ==
The holotype is an adult male measuring 37 mm (1.5 in) in snout–vent length the paratype is an adult female measuring 53 mm (2.1 in) in snout–vent length. The head is longer than it is broad. The snout is obtusely pointed. The tympanum is distinct. The toes are webbed. Skin texture is rough. The male has vocal sacs.

== Habitat and conservation ==
Limnonectes kenepaiensis is known from lowland dipterocarp forests and peat swamp forests at elevations below 60 m (200 ft). Breeding probably takes place in water. It is a rare species that is threatened by clear-cutting of lowland tropical rainforests. It is present in the Kubah National Park in Sarawak.
