= Limnonectes shompenorum =

Conservation status
- Least Concern (IUCN 3.1)

Scientific classification
- Kingdom: Animalia
- Phylum: Chordata
- Class: Amphibia
- Order: Anura
- Family: Dicroglossidae
- Genus: Limnonectes
- Species: L. shompenorum

Binomial name
- Limnonectes shompenorum Das, 1996

Species of frog

Limnonectes shompenorum (common name: Shompen frog) is a species of frog in the family Dicroglossidae. It is found in Great Nicobar Island (India), its type locality, and in western Sumatra (Indonesia). It is similar to Limnonectes macrodon. The name refers to Shompen people, the indigenous people of the interior of Great Nicobar Island.

== Description ==
Limnonectes shompenorum is a relatively large, robust frog. Adult females measure 72–88 mm (2.8–3.5 in) in snout–vent length. A male measured 84 mm (3.3 in) in snout–vent length.

Limnonectes shompenorum can be distinguished from its closest relatives by the following suite of characters:

"(1) head narrower than body, and longer than broad; (2) interorbital distance greater than the upper eyelid width; (3) fingers with movable dermal fringe; (4) tips of fingers weakly swollen; (5) finger 4 longer than finger 2; (6) toes completely webbed; (7) dark horizontal loreal stripe; and (8) partially pigmented eggs."

== Diet ==
Limnonectes shompenorum feed on relatively large prey; the stomachs in the type series contained beetles, a cockroach, and a small, unidentified frog.

== Habitat and conservation ==
Limnonectes shompenorum are found in leaf-litter along rivers in tropical forest and forest edges, but also some distance away from rivers. Limnonectes shompenorum is a common species not considered threatened by the International Union for Conservation of Nature (IUCN), although these frogs are to some extent suffering from habitat loss and pollution from agriculture. They are also harvested for food.
