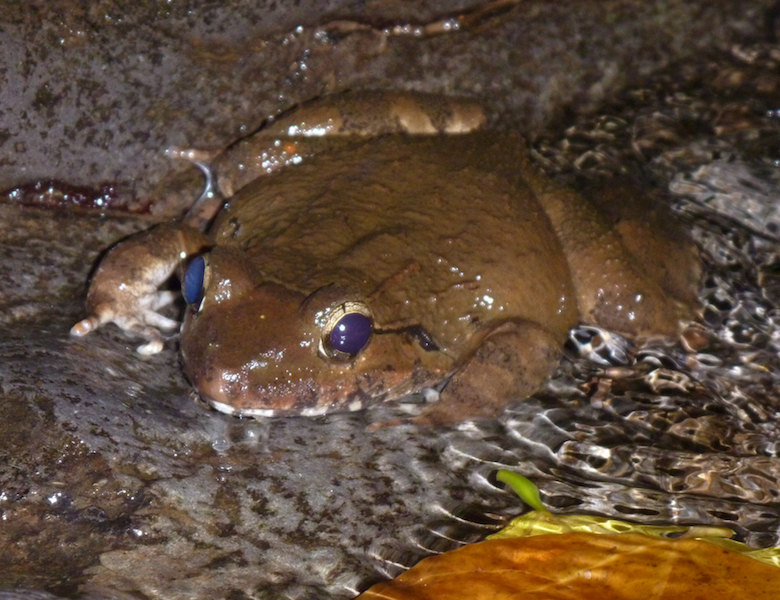

Conservation status
- Least Concern (IUCN 3.1)

Scientific classification
- Kingdom: Animalia
- Phylum: Chordata
- Class: Amphibia
- Order: Anura
- Family: Dicroglossidae
- Genus: Limnonectes
- Species: L. kadarsani

Binomial name
- Limnonectes kadarsani Iskandar, Boeadi & Sancoyo, 1996

= Limnonectes kadarsani =

Species of frog

Limnonectes kadarsani is a species of frog in the family Dicroglossidae. It is endemic to Indonesia where it is found in the Lesser Sunda Islands. Specifically, it has been recorded from Lombok, Sumbawa, Flores, and Adonara. Its natural habitats are tropical primary and secondary wet and dry forests where it occurs around forested streams. It is a relatively common frog. It is not considered threatened by the IUCN although potential threats include exploitation for food, water pollution from agriculture, and forest clearing.
