= Limnonectes heinrichi =

Conservation status
- Vulnerable (IUCN 3.1)

Scientific classification
- Kingdom: Animalia
- Phylum: Chordata
- Class: Amphibia
- Order: Anura
- Family: Dicroglossidae
- Genus: Limnonectes
- Species: L. heinrichi

Binomial name
- Limnonectes heinrichi (Ahl, 1933)

Species of frog

Limnonectes heinrichi is a species of frog in the family Dicroglossidae. It is endemic to Indonesia, where it occurs on Sulawesi.

This frog lives near streams in forested habitat. It is uncommon and may be threatened by deforestation. It is also caught for food. Some populations occur in Bogani Nani Wartabone National Park.
