= Giant Visayan frog =

Conservation status
- Near Threatened (IUCN 3.1)

Scientific classification
- Kingdom: Animalia
- Phylum: Chordata
- Class: Amphibia
- Order: Anura
- Family: Dicroglossidae
- Genus: Limnonectes
- Species: L. visayanus

Binomial name
- Limnonectes visayanus (Inger, 1954)

Synonyms
- Rana magna ssp. visayana Inger, 1958

Species of amphibian

The giant Visayan frog (Limnonectes visayanus) is a species of frog in the family Dicroglossidae. It is endemic to the Philippines, and is known from Masbate, Cebu, Negros, Guimaras, Panay, and Siquijor islands.

Its natural habitats are subtropical or tropical moist lowland forest, subtropical or tropical swampland, subtropical or tropical moist montane forest, subtropical or tropical moist shrubland, subtropical or tropical seasonally wet or flooded lowland grassland, rivers, intermittent rivers, freshwater marshes, intermittent freshwater marshes, arable land, pastureland, plantations, rural gardens, urban areas, heavily degraded former forest, ponds, irrigated land, and seasonally flooded agricultural land.

Giant Visayan frog is threatened by habitat loss. It is classified as vulnerable and considered to be facing a high risk of extinction in the wild.
