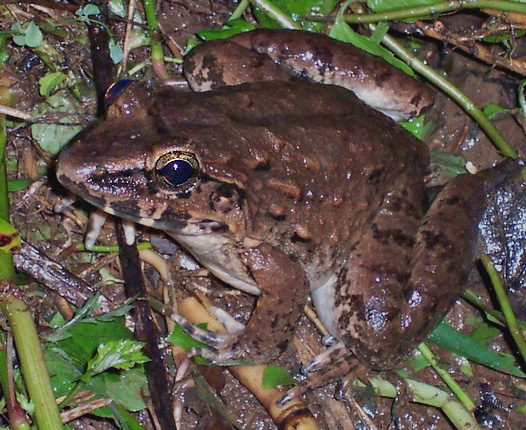
- Fanged river frog (Limnonectes macrodon)

Scientific classification
- Kingdom: Animalia
- Phylum: Chordata
- Class: Amphibia
- Order: Anura
- Family: Dicroglossidae
- Subfamily: Dicroglossinae
- Genus: Limnonectes; Fitzinger, 1843

Species
- More than 90, see text

Synonyms
- Taylorana Dubois, 1986

= Limnonectes =

Genus of fork-tongued frogs

Limnonectes is a genus of fork-tongued frogs of 91 known species, but new ones are still being described occasionally. They are collectively known as fanged frogs because they tend to have unusually large teeth, which are small or absent in other frogs.

== Habitat ==
These frogs are found throughout East and Southeast Asia, most commonly near forest streams. Multiple species of Limnonectes may occupy the same area in harmony. Large-bodied species cluster around fast rivers, while smaller ones live among leaf-litter or on stream banks. The Indonesian island of Sulawesi is home to at least 15 species of this frog, only four of which have been formally described.

== Lifecycle ==
Tadpoles of this genus have adapted to a variety of conditions. Most species (e.g. Blyth's river frog L. blythii or the fanged river frog L. macrodon) develop normally, with free-swimming tadpoles that eat food. The tadpoles of the corrugated frog (L. laticeps) are free-swimming but endotrophic, meaning they do not eat but live on stored yolk until metamorphosis into frogs. Before, L. limborgi was assumed to have direct development (eggs hatching as tiny, full-formed frogs), but more careful observations have shown it has free-swimming but endotrophic larvae; this probably applies to the closely related L. hascheanus, too. L. larvaepartus is the only known species of frog that gives live birth to tadpoles. Parental care is performed by males.

== Species ==
- Limnonectes abanghamidi Matsui, 2024
- Limnonectes acanthi (Taylor, 1923)
- Limnonectes arathooni (Smith, 1927)
- Limnonectes asperatus (Inger, Boeadi & Taufik, 1996)
- Limnonectes bagoensis Köhler, Zwitzers, Than & Thammachoti, 2021
- Limnonectes bagoyoma Köhler, Zwitzer, Than & Thammachoti, 2021
- Limnonectes bannaensis Ye, Fei, Xie & Jiang, 2007
- Limnonectes barioensis Matsui & Nishikawa, 2024
- Limnonectes batulawensis Matsui, Nishikawa & Eto, 2024
- Limnonectes beloncioi Herr, Vallejos, Meneses, Abraham, Otterholt, Siler, Rico & Brown, 2021
- Limnonectes blythii (Boulenger, 1920)
- Limnonectes cassiopeia Herr, Som & Brown, 2024
- Limnonectes cintalubang Matsui, Nishikawa & Eto, 2014
- Limnonectes coffeatus Phimmachak, Sivongxay, Seateun, Yodthong, Rujirawan, Neang, Aowphol & Stuart, 2018
- Limnonectes conspicillatus (Günther, 1872)
- Limnonectes dabanus (Smith, 1922)
- Limnonectes dammermani (Mertens, 1929)
- Limnonectes deinodon Dehling, 2014
- Limnonectes diuatus (Brown & Alcala, 1977)
- Limnonectes doriae (Boulenger, 1887)
- Limnonectes fastigatus Stuart, Schoen, Nelson, Maher, Neang, Rowley & McLeod, 2020
- Limnonectes finchi (Inger, 1966)
- Limnonectes fragilis (Liu & Hu, 1973)
- Limnonectes fujianensis Ye & Fei, 1994
- Limnonectes ghoshi (Chanda, 1991)
- Limnonectes grunniens (Latreille, 1801)
- Limnonectes gyldenstolpei (Andersson, 1916)
- Limnonectes hascheanus (Stoliczka, 1870)
- Limnonectes heinrichi (Ahl, 1933)
- Limnonectes hikidai Matsui & Nishikawa, 2014
- Limnonectes ibanorum (Inger, 1964)
- Limnonectes ingeri (Kiew, 1978)
- Limnonectes isanensis McLeod, Kelly & Barley, 2012
- Limnonectes jarujini Matsui, Panha, Khonsue & Kuraishi, 2010
- Limnonectes kadarsani Iskandar, Boeadi & Sancoyo, 1996
- Limnonectes kenepaiensis (Inger, 1966)
- Limnonectes khammonensis (Smith, 1929)
- Limnonectes khasianus (Anderson, 1871)
- Limnonectes kiziriani Pham, Le, Ngo, Ziegler & Nguyen, 2018
- Limnonectes kohchangae (Smith, 1922)
- Limnonectes kong Dehling & Dehling, 2017
- Limnonectes kuhlii (Tschudi, 1838)
- Limnonectes lambirensis Matsui & Nishikawa, 2024
- Limnonectes lanjakensis Matsui & Nishikawa, 2024
- Limnonectes lanjakensis Matsui & Nishikawa, 2024
- Limnonectes larvaepartus Iskandar, Evans & McGuire, 2014
- Limnonectes lauhachindai Aowphol, Rujirawan, Taksinum, Chuaynkern & Stuart, 2015
- Limnonectes leporinus (Andersson, 1923)
- Limnonectes leytensis (Boettger, 1893)
- Limnonectes limborg (Sclater, 1892)
- Limnonectes longchuanensis Suwannapoom, Yuan, Sullivan & McLeod, 2016
- Limnonectes macrocephalus (Inger, 1954)
- Limnonectes macrodon (Duméril & Bibron, 1841)
- Limnonectes macrognathus (Boulenger, 1917)
- Limnonectes magnus (Stejneger, 1910)
- Limnonectes malesianus (Kiew, 1984)
- Limnonectes mawlyndipi (Chanda, 1990)
- Limnonectes megastomias McLeod, 2008
- Limnonectes micrixalus (Taylor, 1923)
- Limnonectes microdiscus (Boettger, 1892)
- Limnonectes microtympanum (Van Kampen, 1907)
- Limnonectes mocquardi Matsui, Dubois & Ohler, 2013
- Limnonectes modestus (Boulenger, 1882)
- Limnonectes namiyei (Stejneger, 1901)
- Limnonectes nguyenorum McLeod, Kurlbaum & Hoang, 2015
- Limnonectes nitidus (Smedley, 1932)
- Limnonectes paginatanensis Matsui, Niskikawa & Shimada, 2024
- Limnonectes palavanensis (Boulenger, 1894)
- Limnonectes paramacrodon (Inger, 1966)
- Limnonectes parvus (Taylor, 1920)
- Limnonectes paulyambuni Matsui, Nishikawa & Shimada, 2024
- Limnonectes penerisanensis Matsui, Niskikawa & Shimada, 2024
- Limnonectes phuyenensis Pham, Do, Le, Ngo, Nguyen, Ziegler & Nguyen, 2020
- Limnonectes phyllofolia Frederick, Iskandar, Riyanto, Hamidy, Reilly, Stubbs, Bloch, Bach & McGuire, 2023
- Limnonectes plicatellus (Stoliczka, 1873)
- Limnonectes poilani (Bourret, 1942)
- Limnonectes pseudodoriae Yodthong, Rujirawan, Stuart & Aowphol, 2021
- Limnonectes quangninhensis Pham, Le, Nguyen, Ziegler, Wu & Nguyen, 2017
- Limnonectes savan Phimmachak, Richards, Sivongxay, Seateun, Chuaynkern, Makchai, Som & Stuart, 2019
- Limnonectes selatan Matsui, Belabut & Ahmad, 2014
- Limnonectes separatus Matsui, Nishikawa & Shimada, 2024
- Limnonectes shompenorum Das, 1996
- Limnonectes sinuatodorsalis Matsui, 2015
- Limnonectes sisikdagu McLeod, Horner, Husted, Barley & Iskandar, 2011
- Limnonectes tawauensis Matsui, Nishikawa & Shimada. 2024
- Limnonectes tayloriMatsui, Panha, Khonsue & Kuraishi, 2010
- Limnonectes timorensis (Smith, 1927)
- Limnonectes tweediei (Smith, 1935)
- Limnonectes utara Matsui, Belabut & Ahmad, 2014
- Limnonectes visayanus (Inger, 1954)
- Limnonectes woodworthi (Taylor, 1923)

== Phylogeny ==
=== Pyron & Wiens (2011) ===
The following phylogeny of Limnonectes is from Pyron & Wiens (2011). 35 species are included. Limnonectes is a sister group of Nanorana.

- Limnonectes
  - - - Limnonectes microdiscus
      - Limnonectes kadarsani
    - - Limnonectes laticeps
      - - - Limnonectes limborgi
          - Limnonectes hascheanus
        - - Limnonectes dabanus
          - Limnonectes gyldenstolpei
  - - - - Limnonectes asperatus
        - Limnonectes fragilis
      - - Limnonectes fujianensis
        - - Limnonectes bannaensis
          - Limnonectes kuhlii
    - - - Limnonectes leytensis
        - - Limnonectes acanthi
          - - - Limnonectes microtympanum
              - Limnonectes arathooni
            - - - Limnonectes magnus
                - - Limnonectes heinrichi
                  - Limnonectes modestus
              - - Limnonectes woodworthi
                - - Limnonectes macrocephalus
                  - Limnonectes visayanus
      - - - Limnonectes leporinus
          - - Limnonectes parvus
            - Limnonectes palavanensis
        - - - Limnonectes ibanorum
            - Limnonectes grunniens
          - - - Limnonectes blythii
              - Limnonectes poilani
            - - - Limnonectes paramacrodon
                - - - Limnonectes macrodon
                    - Limnonectes shompenorum
                  - - Limnonectes malesianus
                    - - Limnonectes ingeri
                      - Limnonectes finchi

=== Aowphol, et al. (2015) ===
The following Limnonectes phylogeny is from Aowphol, et al. (2015). 20 species are included.

- Limnonectes
  - - Limnonectes fragilis
    - - Limnonectes leporinus
      - - - Limnonectes leytensis
          - Limnonectes woodworthi
        - - Limnonectes malesianus
          - Limnonectes poilani
  - - Limnonectes khasianus
    - - Limnonectes kadarsani
      - Limnonectes microdiscus
    - - Limnonectes bannaensis
      - Limnonectes fujianensis
    - - - Limnonectes lauhachindai
        - - Limnonectes dabanus
          - Limnonectes gyldenstolpei
      - - Limnonectes kohchangae
        - - Limnonectes plicatellus
          - - Limnonectes doriae
            - - Limnonectes macrognathus
              - - Limnonectes hascheanus
                - Limnonectes limborgi

=== McLeod, et al. (2015) ===
Below is a phylogeny of species within the L. kuhlii species complex (McLeod, et al. 2015). Limnonectes longchuanensis, Limnonectes hikidai, and Limnonectes cintalubang are also part of the L. kuhlii species complex.

- - - Limnonectes kuhlii (Java)
    - Limnonectes sisikdagu
  - Limnonectes fragilis
  - - - Limnonectes bannaensis
      - - Limnonectes namiyei
        - Limnonectes fujianensis
    - - Limnonectes jarujini
      - - Limnonectes nguyenorum
        - - Limnonectes isanensis
          - Limnonectes taylori
          - Limnonectes megastomias
