= Limnonectes taylori =

Conservation status
- Least Concern (IUCN 3.1)

Scientific classification
- Kingdom: Animalia
- Phylum: Chordata
- Class: Amphibia
- Order: Anura
- Family: Dicroglossidae
- Genus: Limnonectes
- Species: L. taylori

Binomial name
- Limnonectes taylori Matsui et al., 2010

Species of amphibian

Limnonectes taylori is a species of frogs in the family Dicroglossidae, first described from Doi Inthanon, Thailand. It occurs in northwestern Thailand and into northern Laos and extreme east-central Myanmar, possibly into adjacent Vietnam. In Thailand, it occurs in the provinces Chiang Mai, Mae Hong Son, Lampang, Nan, and Tak.
