= Limnonectes hikidai =

Scientific classification
- Kingdom: Animalia
- Phylum: Chordata
- Class: Amphibia
- Order: Anura
- Family: Dicroglossidae
- Genus: Limnonectes
- Species: L. hikidai

Binomial name
- Limnonectes hikidai Matsui and Nishikawa, 2014

Species of amphibian

Limnonectes hikidai is a species of fanged frogs in the family Dicroglossidae. It is endemic to Sarawak, East Malaysia (Borneo). Its type locality is Mount Serapi in Kubah National Park, Matang, Kuching District, Sarawak. It is closely related to Limnonectes cintalubang.
