= Limnonectes ghoshi =

Conservation status
- Data Deficient (IUCN 3.1)

Scientific classification
- Kingdom: Animalia
- Phylum: Chordata
- Class: Amphibia
- Order: Anura
- Family: Dicroglossidae
- Genus: Limnonectes
- Species: L. ghoshi

Binomial name
- Limnonectes ghoshi (Chanda, 1991)

Synonyms
- Rana ghoshi Chanda, 1991; Occidozyga ghoshi Dutta, 1992; Euphlyctis ghoshi Dutta, 1997

Species of frog

Limnonectes ghoshi (Manipur frog, Ghosh's frog) is a species of frog found in Manipur, India. It is only known from its type locality in Khugairk Reserve Forest, Manipur.

This frog has been observed in mixed evergreen forests about 925 meters above sea level. The IUCN classifies this frog as data deficient and does not identify specific threats.
