= Limnonectes mawlyndipi =

Conservation status
- Data Deficient (IUCN 3.1)

Scientific classification
- Kingdom: Animalia
- Phylum: Chordata
- Class: Amphibia
- Order: Anura
- Family: Dicroglossidae
- Genus: Limnonectes
- Species: L. mawlyndipi

Binomial name
- Limnonectes mawlyndipi (Chanda, 1990)

Species of frog

Limnonectes mawlyndipi is a species of frog in the family Dicroglossidae. It is endemic to India. Its natural habitats are subtropical or tropical moist montane forest, rivers, freshwater marshes, and intermittent freshwater marshes. Its status is insufficiently known.
