= Limnonectes selatan =

Scientific classification
- Kingdom: Animalia
- Phylum: Chordata
- Class: Amphibia
- Order: Anura
- Family: Dicroglossidae
- Genus: Limnonectes
- Species: L. selatan

Binomial name
- Limnonectes selatan Matsui, Belabut & Ahmad, 2014

Species of amphibian

Limnonectes selatan is a species of fanged frogs in the family Dicroglossidae. It is endemic to peninsular Malaysia, in the states of Pahang and Selangor.
