= Limnonectes asperatus =

Conservation status
- Least Concern (IUCN 3.1)

Scientific classification
- Kingdom: Animalia
- Phylum: Chordata
- Class: Amphibia
- Order: Anura
- Family: Dicroglossidae
- Genus: Limnonectes
- Species: L. asperatus

Binomial name
- Limnonectes asperatus (Inger, Boeadi & Taufik, 1996)

Species of frog

Limnonectes asperatus is a species of frog in the family Dicroglossidae. It is endemic to Kalimantan, Borneo, in Indonesia.

This frog lives in rainforests. It is threatened by the loss of its habitat to logging operations.
