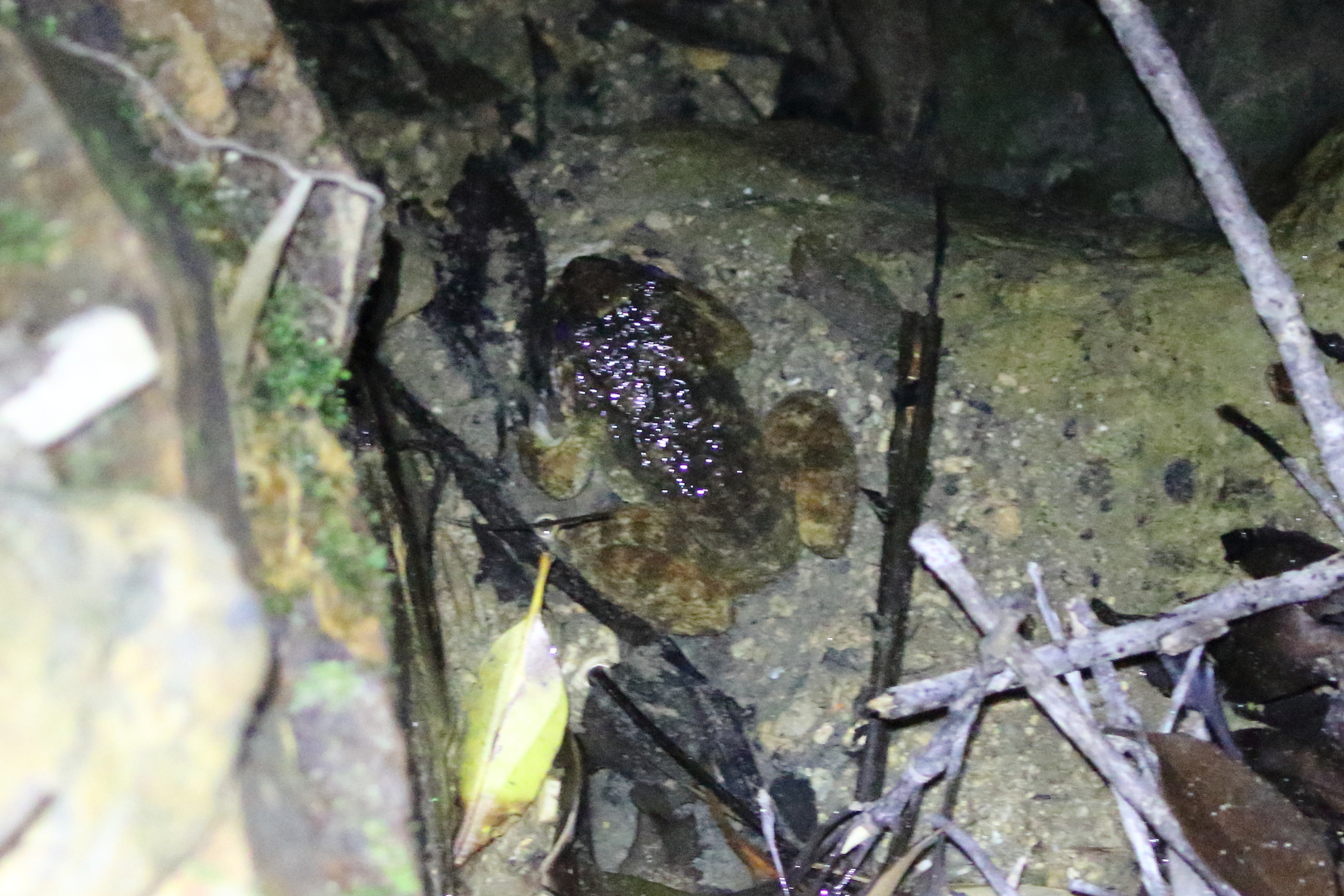

Conservation status
- Endangered (IUCN 3.1)

Scientific classification
- Kingdom: Animalia
- Phylum: Chordata
- Class: Amphibia
- Order: Anura
- Family: Dicroglossidae
- Genus: Limnonectes
- Species: L. namiyei

Binomial name
- Limnonectes namiyei (Stejneger, 1901)

Synonyms
- Rana namiyei Stejneger, 1901

= Limnonectes namiyei =

Namiye's frog

Species of amphibian

Limnonectes namiyei is a species of frog in the family Dicroglossidae. It is endemic to Okinawa Island, Japan. It is named after Motoyoshi Namiye, a Japanese naturalist and herpetologist. Its common name is Okinawa wart frog or Namiye's frog; the latter name is also spelled Namie's frog.

Its natural habitats are upstream regions in primary broad-leaved evergreen forest. It used to be a common frog but has greatly declined because of habitat loss (deforestation, road and dam construction) and predation by invasive mongooses.
