= Limnonectes plicatellus =

Conservation status
- Least Concern (IUCN 3.1)

Scientific classification
- Kingdom: Animalia
- Phylum: Chordata
- Class: Amphibia
- Order: Anura
- Family: Dicroglossidae
- Genus: Limnonectes
- Species: L. plicatellus

Binomial name
- Limnonectes plicatellus (Stoliczka, 1873)

Synonyms
- Rana plicatella Stoliczka, 1873; Euphlyctis plicatella (Stoliczka, 1873)

Species of frog

Limnonectes plicatellus is a species of frog in the family Dicroglossidae. It is found on the Malay Peninsula in Malaysia, Singapore, and southern Peninsular Thailand. Its natural habitats are small streams; it is associated with swampy puddles in primary and degraded rainforest. It is not considered threatened by the IUCN.
