= Philippine small-disked frog =

Conservation status
- Least Concern (IUCN 3.1)

Scientific classification
- Kingdom: Animalia
- Phylum: Chordata
- Class: Amphibia
- Order: Anura
- Family: Dicroglossidae
- Genus: Limnonectes
- Species: L. parvus

Binomial name
- Limnonectes parvus (Taylor, 1920)

Synonyms
- Rana parva Taylor, 1920

Species of amphibian

The Philippine small-disked frog (Limnonectes parvus) is a species of frog in the family Dicroglossidae. It is endemic to the Philippines.

Its natural habitats are subtropical or tropical moist lowland forest, subtropical or tropical moist montane forest, and rivers. It is threatened by habitat loss.
