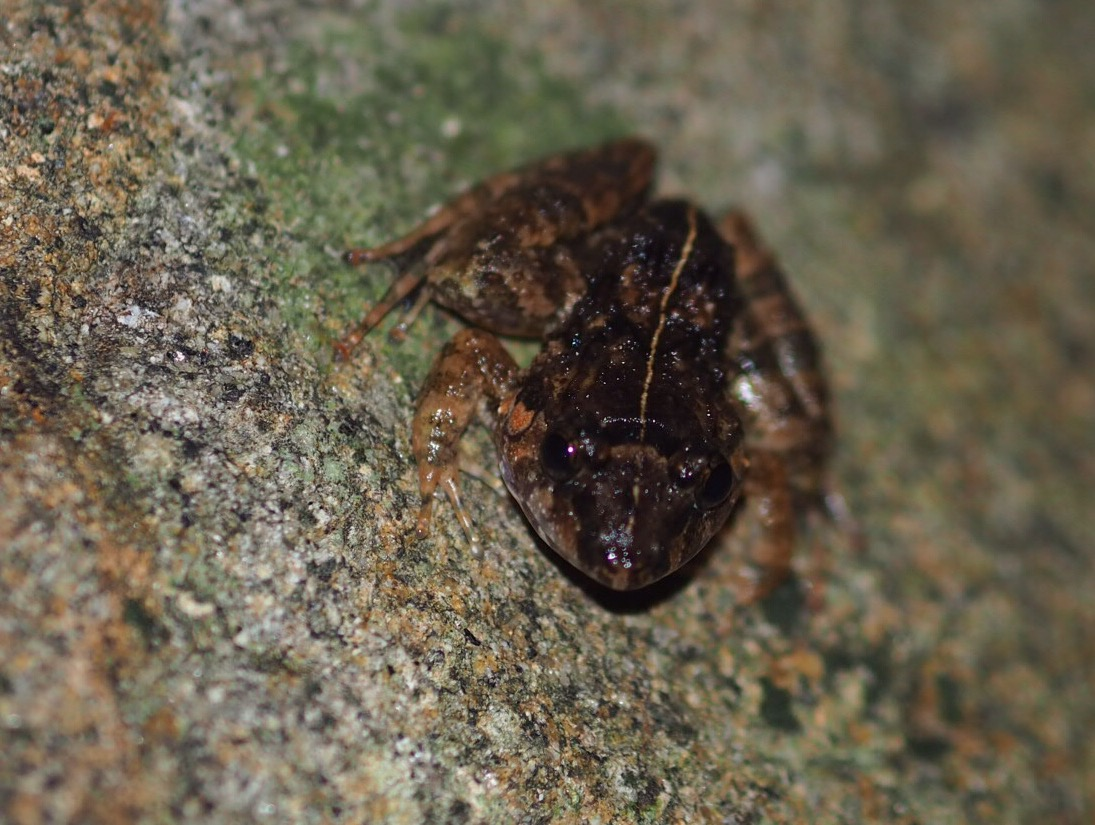
- from southern Thailand

Conservation status
- Least Concern (IUCN 3.1)

Scientific classification
- Kingdom: Animalia
- Phylum: Chordata
- Class: Amphibia
- Order: Anura
- Family: Dicroglossidae
- Genus: Limnonectes
- Species: L. macrognathus

Binomial name
- Limnonectes macrognathus (Boulenger, 1917)

= Limnonectes macrognathus =

Species of frog

Limnonectes macrognathus is a species of frog in the family Dicroglossidae. It is found in Malaysia, Myanmar and Thailand. Its natural habitats are subtropical or tropical moist lowland forests, rivers and intermittent rivers. Its status is insufficiently known.
