= Limnonectes jarujini =

Scientific classification
- Kingdom: Animalia
- Phylum: Chordata
- Class: Amphibia
- Order: Anura
- Family: Dicroglossidae
- Genus: Limnonectes
- Species: L. jarujini

Binomial name
- Limnonectes jarujini Matsui et al., 2010

Species of frog

Limnonectes jarujini is a species of frog in the family Dicroglossidae, first described from near Kaeng Krachan Dam, Thailand. It occurs in southwestern and southern, peninsular Thailand, and likely in adjacent southern Myanmar. It has been recorded from Kanchanaburi, Surat Thani, and Nakhon Si Thammarat provinces.
