= Limnonectes micrixalus =

Conservation status
- Data Deficient (IUCN 3.1)

Scientific classification
- Kingdom: Animalia
- Phylum: Chordata
- Class: Amphibia
- Order: Anura
- Family: Dicroglossidae
- Genus: Limnonectes
- Species: L. micrixalus

Binomial name
- Limnonectes micrixalus (Taylor, 1923)

Species of frog

Limnonectes micrixalus is a species of frog in the family Dicroglossidae. It is endemic to the Philippines.

Its natural habitats are subtropical or tropical moist lowland forest and rivers. Its status is insufficiently known.
