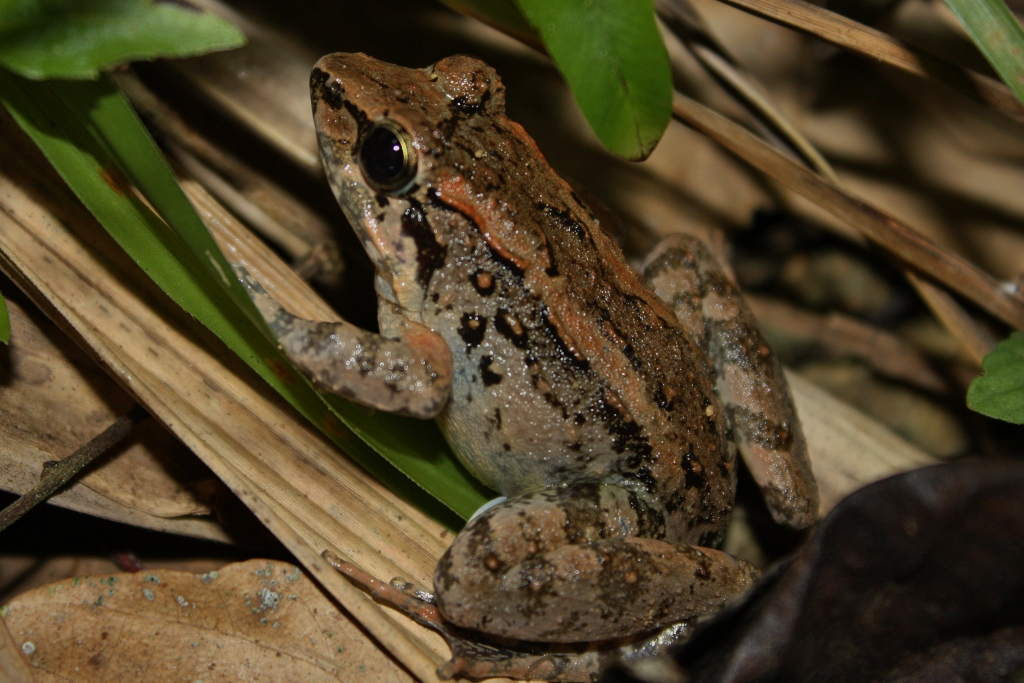

Conservation status
- Least Concern (IUCN 3.1)

Scientific classification
- Kingdom: Animalia
- Phylum: Chordata
- Class: Amphibia
- Order: Anura
- Family: Dicroglossidae
- Genus: Limnonectes
- Species: L. leytensis

Binomial name
- Limnonectes leytensis (Boettger, 1893)

Synonyms
- Hylarana mindanensis Girard, 1853; Rana leytensis Boettger, 1893

= Small disked frog =

Species of amphibian

The small disked frog or swamp frog (Limnonectes leytensis) is a species of frog in the family Dicroglossidae. It is endemic to the Philippines.

Its natural habitats are subtropical or tropical moist lowland forest, subtropical or tropical moist shrubland, subtropical or tropical seasonally wet or flooded lowland grassland, rivers, intermittent rivers, swamps, freshwater marshes, intermittent freshwater marshes, coastal freshwater lagoons, arable land, pastureland, plantations, rural gardens, urban areas, ponds, aquaculture ponds, irrigated land, and seasonally flooded agricultural land. It is not considered threatened by the IUCN.
