= Limnonectes arathooni =

Conservation status
- Vulnerable (IUCN 3.1)

Scientific classification
- Kingdom: Animalia
- Phylum: Chordata
- Class: Amphibia
- Order: Anura
- Family: Dicroglossidae
- Genus: Limnonectes
- Species: L. arathooni

Binomial name
- Limnonectes arathooni (Smith, 1927)

Synonyms
- Rana arathooni Smith, 1927

Species of frog

Limnonectes arathooni is a species of frog in the family Dicroglossidae. It is endemic to southwestern Sulawesi, Indonesia.

This frog is only known from two mountains on the island of Sulawesi. It lives in undisturbed forest habitat near rivers. The female lays eggs on the ground and the male guards them. The larvae emerge, slide downhill, and enter the rivers. The species is threatened by the loss of its riverside forest habitat to agriculture.
