= Limnonectes khammonensis =

Conservation status
- Data Deficient (IUCN 3.1)

Scientific classification
- Kingdom: Animalia
- Phylum: Chordata
- Class: Amphibia
- Order: Anura
- Family: Dicroglossidae
- Genus: Limnonectes
- Species: L. khammonensis

Binomial name
- Limnonectes khammonensis (Smith, 1929)

Synonyms
- Rana khammonensis Smith, 1929

Species of frog

Limnonectes khammonensis is a species of frog in the family Dicroglossidae. Endemic to Laos and Vietnam, its status is insufficiently known.
