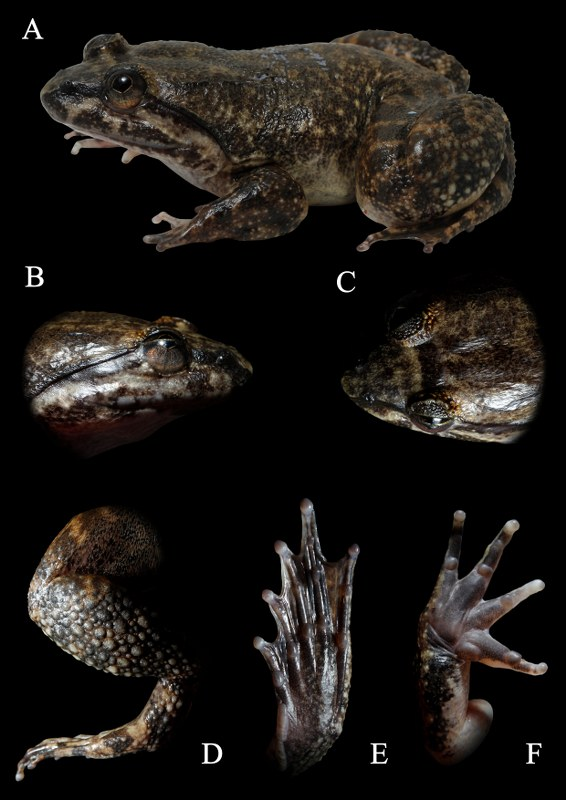

Scientific classification
- Kingdom: Animalia
- Phylum: Chordata
- Class: Amphibia
- Order: Anura
- Family: Dicroglossidae
- Genus: Limnonectes
- Species: L. utara

Binomial name
- Limnonectes utara Matsui, Belabut & Ahmad, 2014

= Limnonectes utara =

Species of amphibian

Limnonectes utara is a species of fanged frogs in the family Dicroglossidae. It can be found in Malaysia (in the states of Perak and Terengganu) and Thailand.
