= Limnonectes ibanorum =

Conservation status
- Least Concern (IUCN 3.1)

Scientific classification
- Kingdom: Animalia
- Phylum: Chordata
- Class: Amphibia
- Order: Anura
- Family: Dicroglossidae
- Genus: Limnonectes
- Species: L. ibanorum

Binomial name
- Limnonectes ibanorum (Inger, 1964)

Species of frog

Limnonectes ibanorum is a species of frog in the family Dicroglossidae. It is endemic to Borneo. Its natural habitats are subtropical or tropical moist lowland forests and rivers. It is becoming rare due to habitat loss.
