= Limnonectes sinuatodorsalis =

Scientific classification
- Kingdom: Animalia
- Phylum: Chordata
- Class: Amphibia
- Order: Anura
- Family: Dicroglossidae
- Genus: Limnonectes
- Species: L. sinuatodorsalis

Binomial name
- Limnonectes sinuatodorsalis Matsui, 2015

Species of amphibian

Limnonectes sinuatodorsalis is a species of fanged frog in the family Dicroglossidae. It is endemic to Borneo, where it was found in the border region of East Kalimantan and Sarawak.
