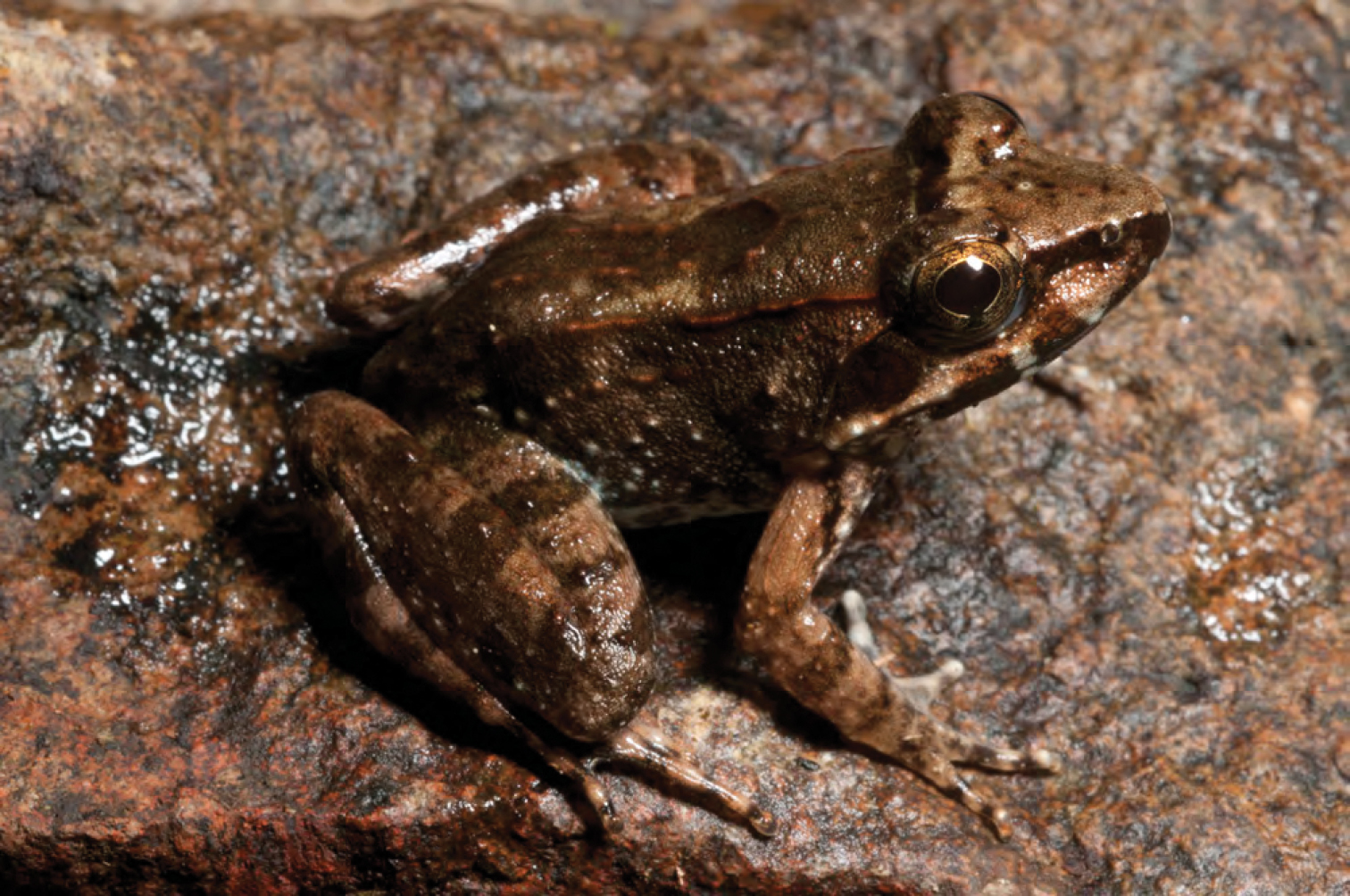
- Limnonectes woodworthi

Conservation status
- Least Concern (IUCN 3.1)

Scientific classification
- Kingdom: Animalia
- Phylum: Chordata
- Class: Amphibia
- Order: Anura
- Family: Dicroglossidae
- Genus: Limnonectes
- Species: L. woodworthi

Binomial name
- Limnonectes woodworthi (Taylor, 1923)

Synonyms
- Rana woodworthi Taylor, 1923

= Woodworth's frog =

Species of amphibian

The Woodworth's frog (Limnonectes woodworthi) is a species of frog in the family Dicroglossidae. It is endemic to the Philippines. Its natural habitats are subtropical or tropical moist lowland forest, subtropical or tropical moist montane forest, subtropical or tropical moist shrubland, subtropical or tropical seasonally wet or flooded lowland grassland, rivers, intermittent rivers, freshwater lakes, intermittent freshwater lakes, freshwater marshes, intermittent freshwater marshes, freshwater springs, coastal freshwater lagoons, arable land, pastureland, plantations, rural gardens, urban areas, water storage areas, ponds, aquaculture ponds, open excavations, irrigated land, and seasonally flooded agricultural land.
