= Limnonectes longchuanensis =

Scientific classification
- Kingdom: Animalia
- Phylum: Chordata
- Class: Amphibia
- Order: Anura
- Family: Dicroglossidae
- Genus: Limnonectes
- Species: L. longchuanensis

Binomial name
- Limnonectes longchuanensis Suwannapoom, 2016

Species of amphibian

Limnonectes longchuanensis is a species of fanged frogs in the family Dicroglossidae. It is endemic to Yunnan, China (in Husa 户撒, Longchuan County and Yingjiang County) and Myanmar (in Kachin State, Sagaing Division, and Chin State).

It is part of the Limnonectes kuhlii complex. It is found in evergreen forests along hillside streams.
