= Limnonectes cintalubang =

Conservation status
- Endangered (IUCN 3.1)

Scientific classification
- Kingdom: Animalia
- Phylum: Chordata
- Class: Amphibia
- Order: Anura
- Family: Dicroglossidae
- Genus: Limnonectes
- Species: L. cintalubang

Binomial name
- Limnonectes cintalubang Matsui, Nishikawa, and Eto, 2014

Species of amphibian

Limnonectes cintalubang is a species of fanged frogs in the family Dicroglossidae. It is endemic to western Sarawak, East Malaysia (Borneo), and is only known from two locations. It is closely related to Limnonectes hikidai.

Limnonectes cintalubang occurs in secondary forest with mixed bamboo and broad-leaf trees. They can be found near burrows that they use to hide when disturbed. Reproduction probably takes place in streams.
