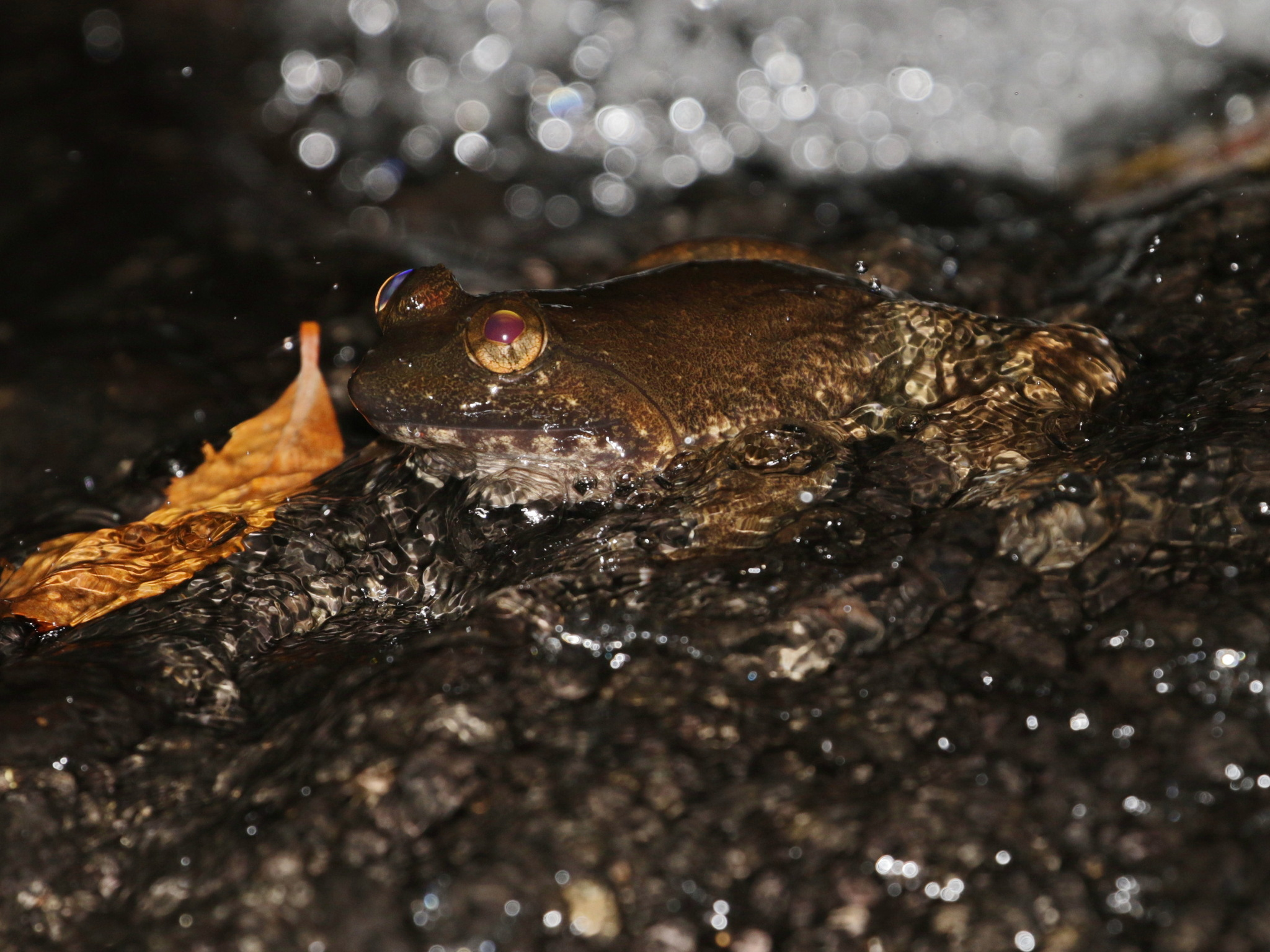

Conservation status
- Vulnerable (IUCN 3.1)

Scientific classification
- Kingdom: Animalia
- Phylum: Chordata
- Class: Amphibia
- Order: Anura
- Family: Dicroglossidae
- Genus: Limnonectes
- Species: L. megastomias

Binomial name
- Limnonectes megastomias McLeod, 2008

= Limnonectes megastomias =

Species of amphibian

Limnonectes megastomias is a species of frogs with fangs that was discovered in Thailand in 2008. The frog eats birds and insects. The male frogs use their fangs to attack other males in combat. The species have also been known to eat other frogs.

== Range ==
Limnonectes megastomias has been recorded from these locations in eastern Thailand (McLeod, 2008).

- Phu Luang Wildlife Sanctuary, Loei Province (type locality)
- Sakaerat Environmental Research Station, Wang Nam Khiao District, Nakhon Ratchasima Province
- Pang Sida National Park, Sa Kaeo Province

== Morphology ==
Limnonectes megastomias is a robust, very large-headed fanged frog. Adult males range from 40 to 123.7 mm SVL and the females measure 53.5 – 86.3 mm SVL. The head is somewhat longer than wide, and males have larger heads (41-56% of SVL) than females (39-45% of SVL). Males also have thick, elongated odontoid processes, which act as “fangs.” These same processes are present in females but are reduced in size. Males have nuptial pads, consisting of tiny spines on the medial surface of Finger I and the dorsomedial surface of Finger II, above the fringe on the preaxial side. The snout is rounded when viewed from above, obtuse when viewed in profile, and protrudes beyond the lower jaw. The canthus rostralis is rounded and the loreal region is concave. The upper lip is swollen and flares out, extending as far as the post-rictal tubercle. Eyes have a diameter 15% of the head length, and the upper eyelid width is 63% of the interorbital distance. The pupil has a diamond shape. Vomerine teeth are present on oblique ridges.
