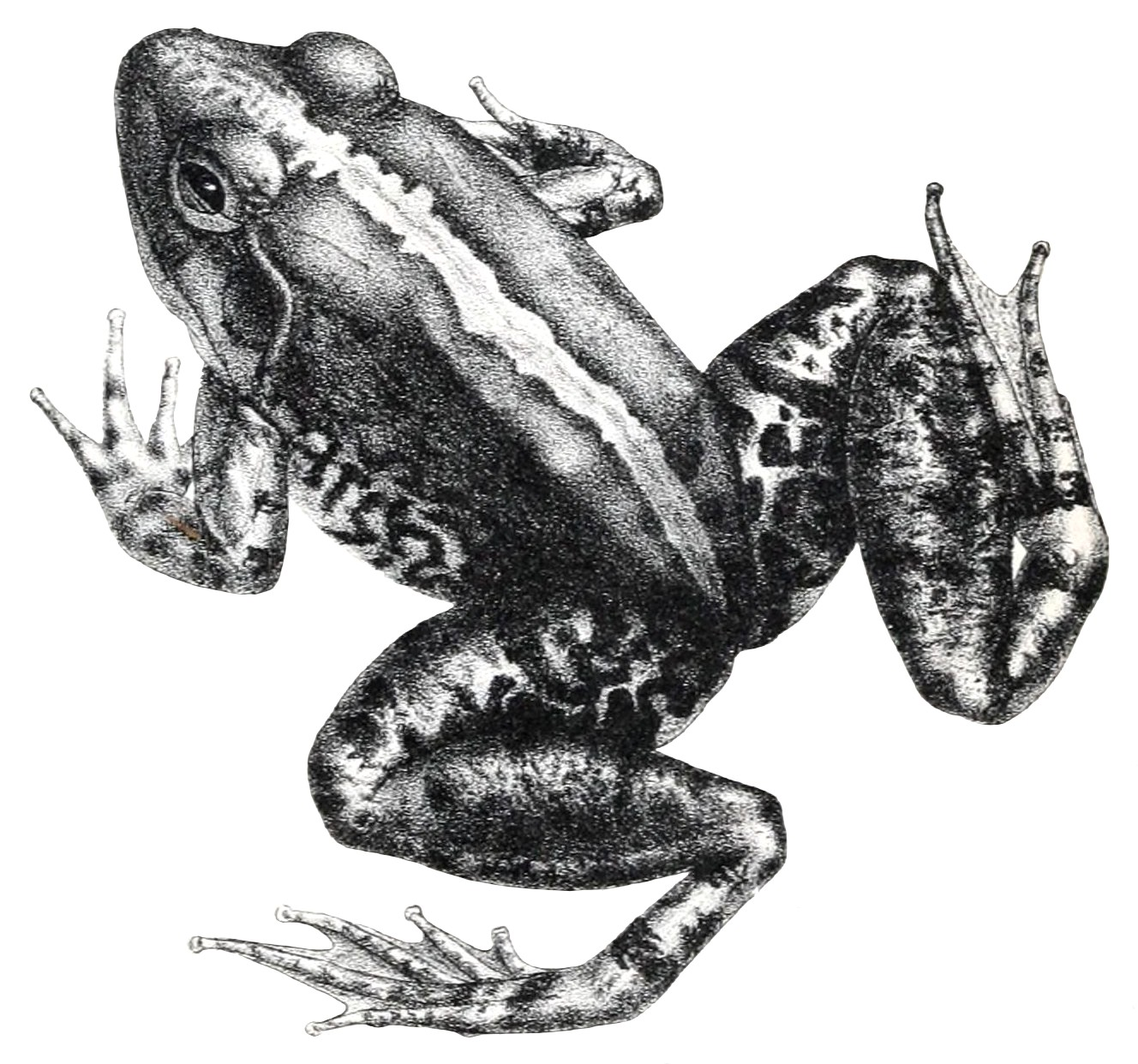

Conservation status
- Least Concern (IUCN 3.1)

Scientific classification
- Kingdom: Animalia
- Phylum: Chordata
- Class: Amphibia
- Order: Anura
- Family: Dicroglossidae
- Genus: Limnonectes
- Species: L. modestus

Binomial name
- Limnonectes modestus (Boulenger, 1882)

= Limnonectes modestus =

Species of frog

Limnonectes modestus is a species of frog in the family Dicroglossidae. It is endemic to Indonesia.

Its natural habitats are subtropical or tropical moist lowland forest, subtropical or tropical mangrove forest, subtropical or tropical moist montane forest, rivers, intertidal marshes, rural gardens, urban areas, and heavily degraded former forest. It is not considered threatened by the IUCN.
