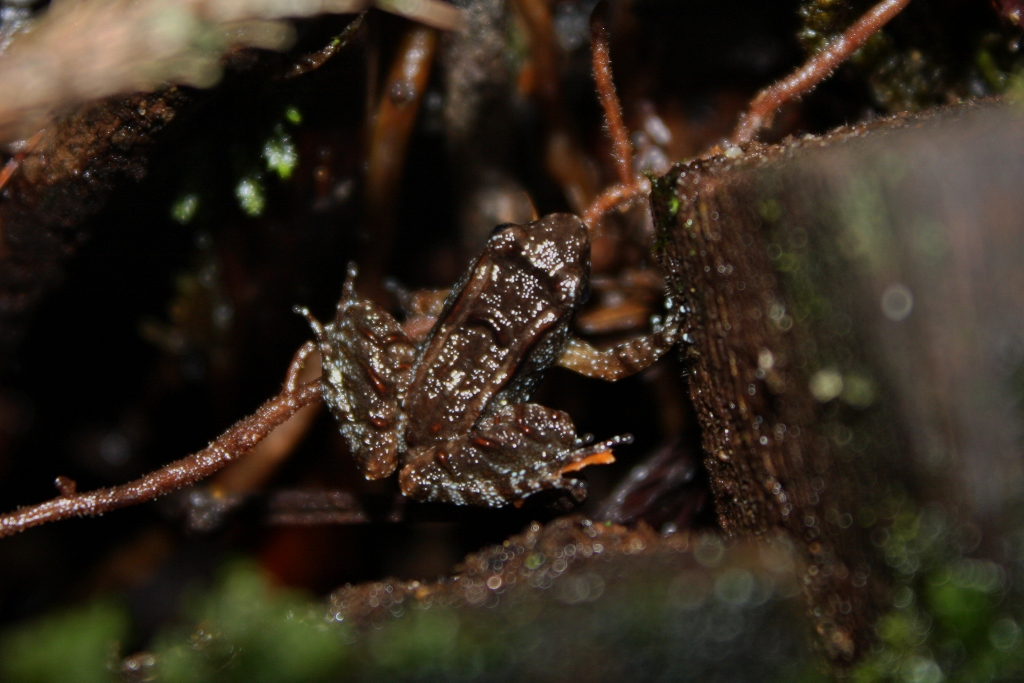
- Limnonectes palavanensis from the Crocker Range, Borneo

Conservation status
- Least Concern (IUCN 3.1)

Scientific classification
- Kingdom: Animalia
- Phylum: Chordata
- Class: Amphibia
- Order: Anura
- Family: Dicroglossidae
- Genus: Limnonectes
- Species: L. palavanensis

Binomial name
- Limnonectes palavanensis (Boulenger, 1894)

Synonyms
- Rana palavanensis Boulenger, 1894

= Limnonectes palavanensis =

Species of frog

Limnonectes palavanensis (common names: smooth guardian frog, Palawan wart frog) is a species of frog in the family Dicroglossidae. It is found in the Palawan Island (the Philippines, its type locality) and in Borneo (Brunei, Indonesia, Malaysia). The species shows paternal care, a relatively rare trait in frogs.

== Description ==
Male Limnonectes palavanensis grow to about 30 mm (1.2 in) and females to about 40 mm (1.6 in) in snout–vent length. There is a V-shaped ridge between the shoulders, and a sharp interorbital band that separates the anterior part of the head from differently colorer back. Juveniles have a medial vertebral stripe that in some populations persists in adults too.

The tadpole is moderately flat (dorsoventrally compressed). The tail is twice the length of the body. The tail fin is low and ends in a pointed tip.

== Reproduction ==
The male of this species guard the tadpoles that hatch from the eggs laid on the ground. The male then carries the tadpoles on its back to water.

== Habitat and conservation ==
Its natural habitats are lower montane and lowland forests. The tadpoles develop in small rain pools and quiet sections of small, slow moving streams.

The habitat of this species is mostly well protected, although it can potentially be impacted by habitat loss. It occurs in the Crocker Range National Park.
