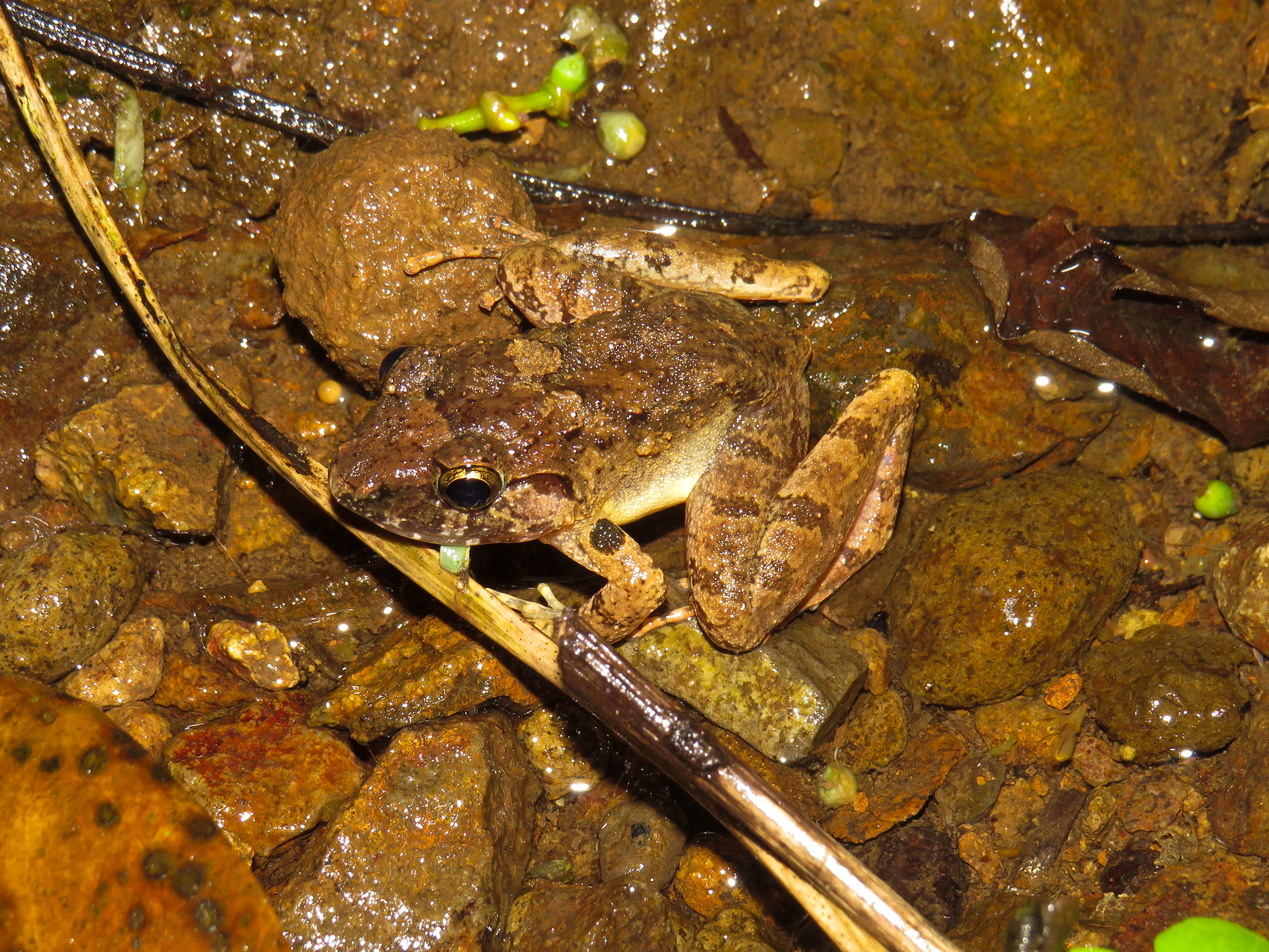

Conservation status
- Least Concern (IUCN 3.1)

Scientific classification
- Kingdom: Animalia
- Phylum: Chordata
- Class: Amphibia
- Order: Anura
- Family: Dicroglossidae
- Genus: Limnonectes
- Species: L. microdiscus

Binomial name
- Limnonectes microdiscus (Boettger, 1892)

= Limnonectes microdiscus =

Species of frog

Limnonectes microdiscus is a species of frog in the family Dicroglossidae. It is endemic to Indonesia and occurs in Java and southern Sumatra.

Its natural habitats are subtropical or tropical moist lowland forest, subtropical or tropical moist montane forest, and rivers. It is not considered threatened by the IUCN.
