= Limnonectes tweediei =

Conservation status
- Least Concern (IUCN 3.1)

Scientific classification
- Kingdom: Animalia
- Phylum: Chordata
- Class: Amphibia
- Order: Anura
- Family: Dicroglossidae
- Genus: Limnonectes
- Species: L. tweediei

Binomial name
- Limnonectes tweediei (Smith, 1935)

Synonyms
- Rana tweediei Smith, 1935; Rana ulukalensis Nakatani, 1969

Species of amphibian

Limnonectes tweediei (common name: Tweedie's wart frog) is a species of frogs in the family Dicroglossidae. It is found in Sumatra (Indonesia) and the Malay Peninsula (Malaysia).

Natural habitat of Limnonectes tweediei are muddy pools in rainforests near small streams and seepages. It makes holes for breeding. It is becoming rare due to pollution and habitat degradation.
