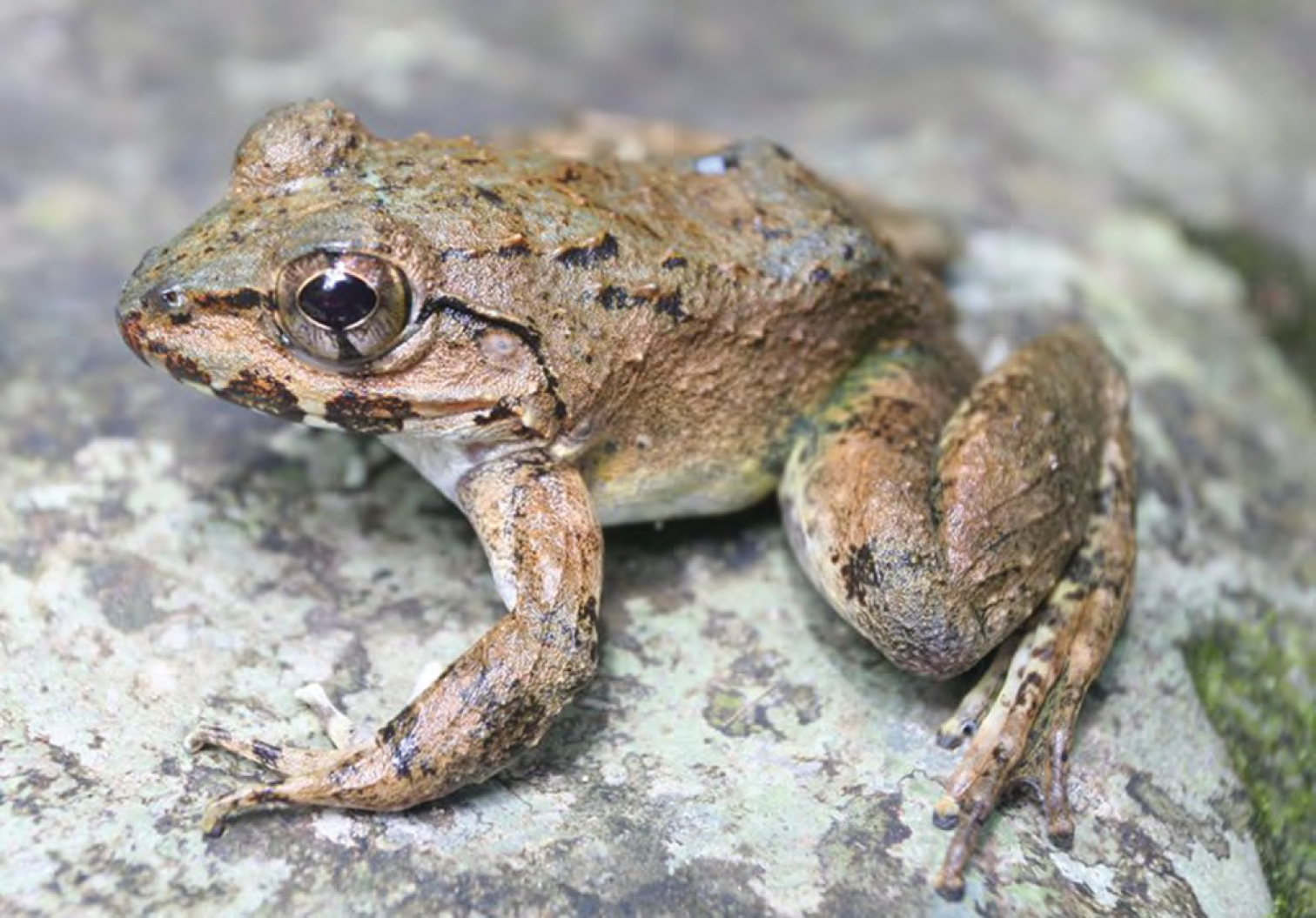
- Limnonectes macrocephalus

Conservation status
- Near Threatened (IUCN 3.1)

Scientific classification
- Kingdom: Animalia
- Phylum: Chordata
- Class: Amphibia
- Order: Anura
- Family: Dicroglossidae
- Genus: Limnonectes
- Species: L. macrocephalus

Binomial name
- Limnonectes macrocephalus (Inger, 1954)

= Luzon fanged frog =

Species of amphibian

The Luzon fanged frog (Limnonectes macrocephalus) is a species of frog in the family Dicroglossidae. It is endemic to the Philippines.

Its natural habitats are subtropical or tropical moist lowland forest, subtropical or tropical moist montane forest, rivers, intermittent rivers, freshwater marshes, intermittent freshwater marshes, coastal freshwater lagoons, arable land, pastureland, and plantations . It is becoming rare due to habitat loss.
