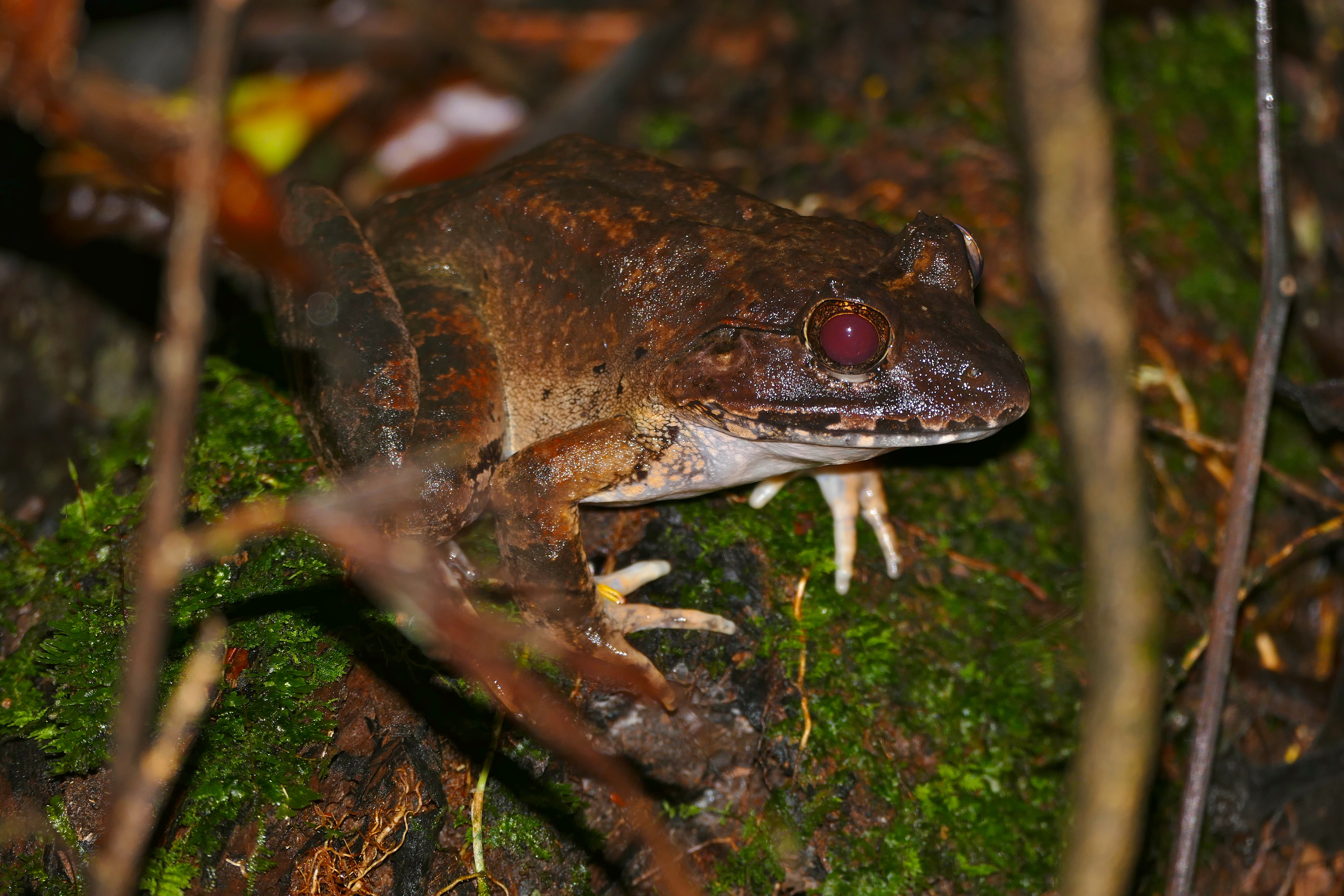
- A giant river frog at the Gunung Mulu National Park, Sarawak.

Conservation status
- Least Concern (IUCN 3.1)

Scientific classification
- Kingdom: Animalia
- Phylum: Chordata
- Class: Amphibia
- Order: Anura
- Family: Dicroglossidae
- Genus: Limnonectes
- Species: L. leporinus

Binomial name
- Limnonectes leporinus Andersson, 1923

= Giant river frog =

Species of amphibian

The giant river frog (Limnonectes leporinus) is a species of frog in the family Dicroglossidae. It is endemic to Borneo, and found in Brunei, Kalimantan (Indonesia), and Sabah and Sarawak (Malaysia).

Giant river frogs inhabit the banks of small to large, rocky streams in hilly lowland rainforests. The tadpoles develop in quiet side pools of streams. It is locally affected by deforestation and over-exploitation, but it is not considered threatened by the IUCN.
