= Limnonectes nitidus =

Conservation status
- Endangered (IUCN 3.1)

Scientific classification
- Kingdom: Animalia
- Phylum: Chordata
- Class: Amphibia
- Order: Anura
- Family: Dicroglossidae
- Genus: Limnonectes
- Species: L. nitidus

Binomial name
- Limnonectes nitidus (Smedley, 1932)

Synonyms
- Rana nitida Smedley, 1932

Species of amphibian

Limnonectes nitidus (common name: Tanah Rata wart frog) is a species of frog in the family Dicroglossidae. It is endemic to Peninsular Malaysia where it is only known from the Cameron Highlands and Fraser's Hill, both in Pahang state.

Limnonectes nitidus inhabits montane rainforests. These frogs congregate and breed in permanently wet seepage areas.

Limnonectes nitidus has a small range, and its habitat is threatened by habitat loss caused by development for agriculture and tourism.
