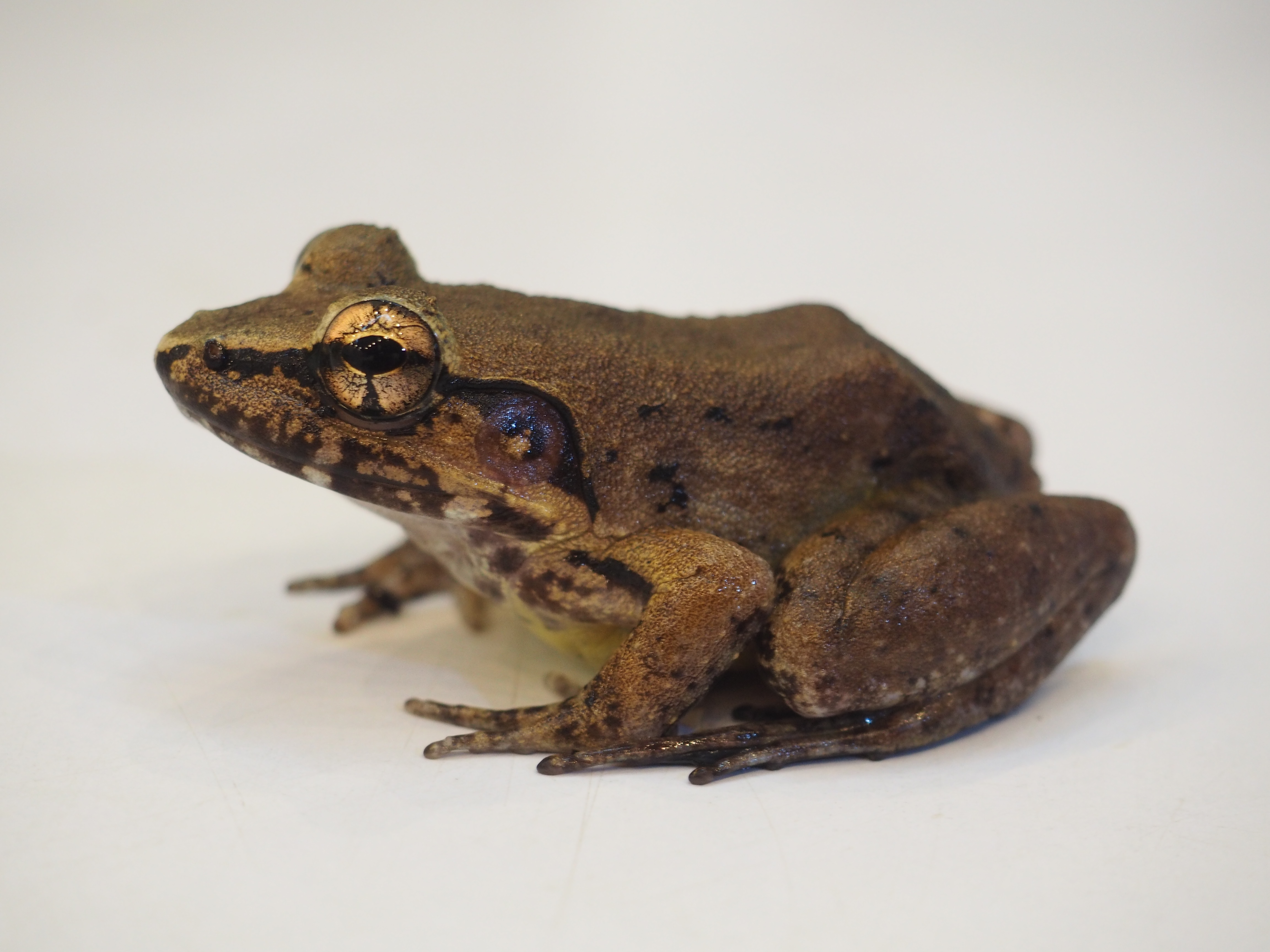

Conservation status
- Least Concern (IUCN 3.1)

Scientific classification
- Kingdom: Animalia
- Phylum: Chordata
- Class: Amphibia
- Order: Anura
- Family: Dicroglossidae
- Genus: Limnonectes
- Species: L. paramacrodon

Binomial name
- Limnonectes paramacrodon (Inger, 1966)

Synonyms
- Rana paramacrodon Inger, 1966

= Limnonectes paramacrodon =

Species of amphibian

Limnonectes paramacrodon (commonly known as the masked swamp frog) is a species of frog in the family Dicroglossidae. It is found in Malay Peninsula (Malaysia, Singapore, and southernmost Thailand), Borneo (Brunei, Indonesia, Malaysia), and Natuna Besar. Its natural habitats are lowland swamp forest areas with small rivers and streams. It is becoming rare due to habitat loss.
