= Limnonectes bannaensis =

Scientific classification
- Kingdom: Animalia
- Phylum: Chordata
- Class: Amphibia
- Order: Anura
- Family: Dicroglossidae
- Genus: Limnonectes
- Species: L. bannaensis

Binomial name
- Limnonectes bannaensis Ye, Fei, Xie & Jiang, 2007

Species of amphibian

Limnonectes bannaensis (vernacular name: Banna large-headed frog) is a species of frogs in the family Dicroglossidae. It is found in southern China (southern and western Yunnan, southwestern and southeastern Guangxi, and western and central Guangdong), Laos, Thailand and Vietnam.

== Description ==
Adult males in the type series measure 68–88 mm (2.7–3.5 in) and adult females 56–67 mm (2.2–2.6 in) in snout–vent length. In a larger series, maximum male and female sizes are respectively 91 and 87 mm (3.6 and 3.4 in). Skin on the dorsum is smooth (wrinkled in Limnonectes kuhlii), with just few fine folds and a few small rounded tubercles scattered posteriorly. The dorsal colouration is brownish or gray brown, with black stripes on areas around the folds. The venter is mottled.

== Habitat ==
Limnonectes bannaensis occurs along streams in mountainous areas at elevations of 320–1,100 m (1,050–3,610 ft) above sea level. The tadpoles develop in the streams.
