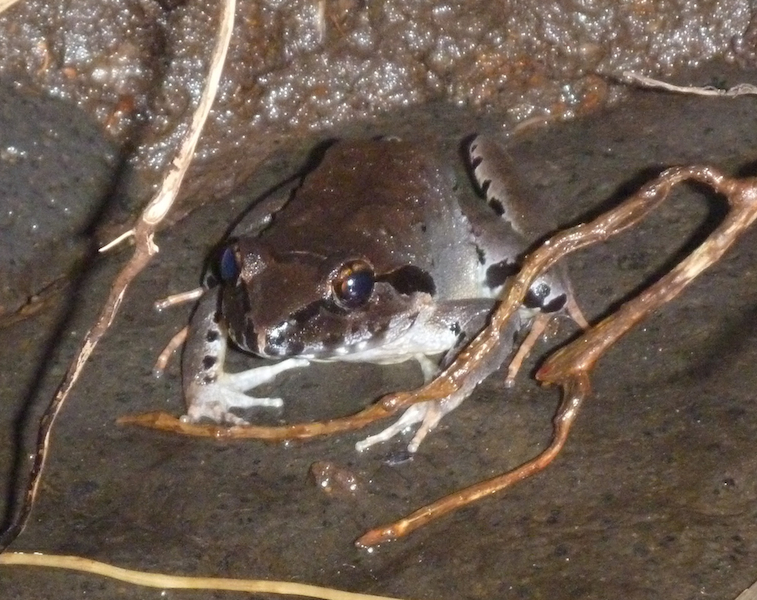

Conservation status
- Least Concern (IUCN 3.1)

Scientific classification
- Kingdom: Animalia
- Phylum: Chordata
- Class: Amphibia
- Order: Anura
- Family: Dicroglossidae
- Genus: Limnonectes
- Species: L. dammermani

Binomial name
- Limnonectes dammermani (Mertens, 1929)

= Limnonectes dammermani =

Species of amphibian

Limnonectes dammermani, Dammerman's wart frog, is a species of frogs in the family Dicroglossidae endemic to the Lesser Sunda Islands of Indonesia, where it can be found on Flores, Sumbawa, and Lombok. It is believed to be a relatively common species that lives near forested streams, as other members of the genus do.
