= Limnonectes grunniens =

Conservation status
- Least Concern (IUCN 3.1)

Scientific classification
- Kingdom: Animalia
- Phylum: Chordata
- Class: Amphibia
- Order: Anura
- Family: Dicroglossidae
- Genus: Limnonectes
- Species: L. grunniens

Binomial name
- Limnonectes grunniens (Latreille, 1801)

Synonyms
- Rana grunniens Latreille in Sonnini de Manoncourt & Latreille, 1801; Rana subsaltans Gravenhorst, 1829; Rana hydromedusa Tschudi, 1838

Species of amphibian

Limnonectes grunniens (common name: Amboina wart frog) is a species of frog in the family Dicroglossidae. It is found in Sulawesi, Molucca Islands, and New Guinea (Indonesia and Papua New Guinea). Frogs from Sulawesi may represent a different, undescribed species.

Limnonectes grunniens is a semi-aquatic frog living and breeding near and in streams, swamps, and pools in tropical rainforest. It can also be found in rural gardens and degraded forests. It is collected for human consumption, which may locally threaten it.
