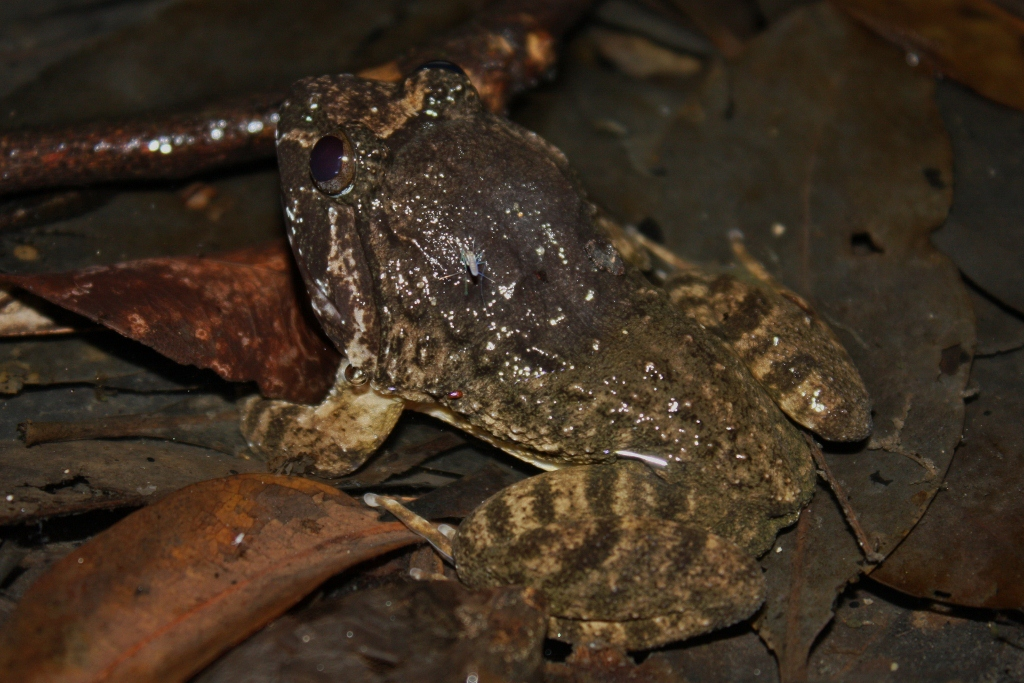

Conservation status
- Least Concern (IUCN 3.1)

Scientific classification
- Kingdom: Animalia
- Phylum: Chordata
- Class: Amphibia
- Order: Anura
- Family: Dicroglossidae
- Genus: Limnonectes
- Species: L. fujianensis

Binomial name
- Limnonectes fujianensis Ye & Fei, 1994

= Limnonectes fujianensis =

Fujian large-headed frog

Species of frog

Fujian large-headed frog (Limnonectes fujianensis) is a species of frog in the family Dicroglossidae. It is most closely related to, and formerly confused with Limnonectes kuhlii. Its name refers to the type locality in Fujian province of China. It is also found in Hunan, Zhejiang, and Jiangxi in China as well as in Taiwan. Other sources give a somewhat broader distribution.

Limnonectes fujianensis is a medium-sized frog, males being 54 mm (2.1 in) and females 48 mm (1.9 in) snout-vent length. Its natural habitats are moist lowland forests, moist montane forest, rivers, intermittent rivers, swamps, freshwater marshes, intermittent freshwater marshes, open excavations, and canals and ditches.
