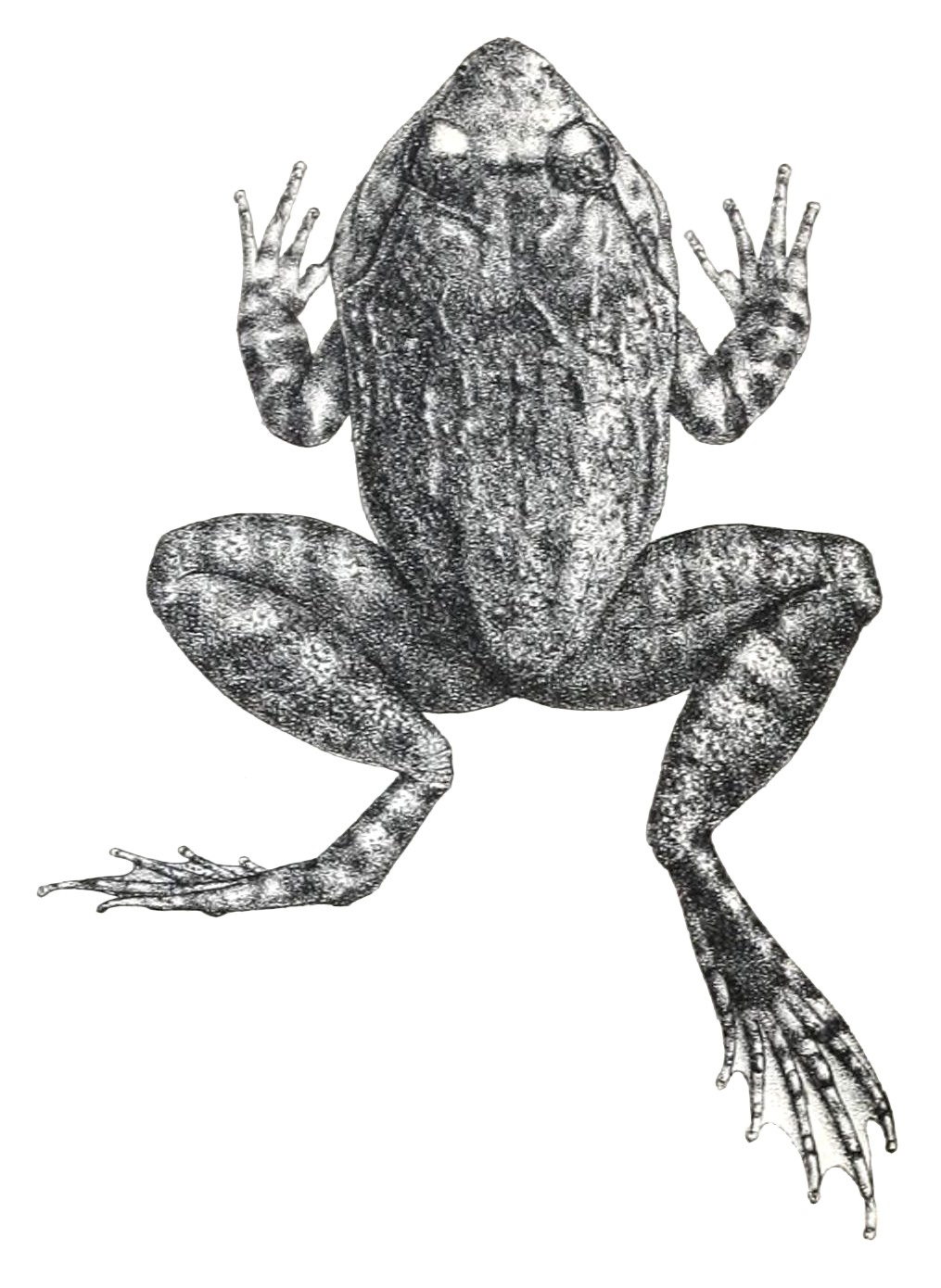

Conservation status
- Least Concern (IUCN 3.1)

Scientific classification
- Kingdom: Animalia
- Phylum: Chordata
- Class: Amphibia
- Order: Anura
- Family: Dicroglossidae
- Genus: Limnonectes
- Species: L. khasianus

Binomial name
- Limnonectes khasianus (Anderson, 1871)

Synonyms
- Limnonectes laticeps (Boulenger, 1882)

= Limnonectes khasianus =

Species of amphibian

Limnonectes khasianus, commonly known as the corrugated frog or rivulet frog, and sometimes called the flat-headed frog, is a species of frog in the family Dicroglossidae. It is found in Brunei, India, Indonesia, Malaysia, Myanmar, Thailand, and also in India, Bangladesh and possibly in Bhutan. Its natural habitats are subtropical or tropical moist lowland forest, subtropical or tropical moist montane forest, rivers, intermittent rivers, freshwater marshes, and intermittent freshwater marshes. It is not considered threatened by the IUCN.
