= Limnonectes fragilis =

Conservation status
- Vulnerable (IUCN 3.1)

Scientific classification
- Kingdom: Animalia
- Phylum: Chordata
- Class: Amphibia
- Order: Anura
- Family: Dicroglossidae
- Genus: Limnonectes
- Species: L. fragilis

Binomial name
- Limnonectes fragilis (Liu & Hu, 1973)

Synonyms
- Rana fragilis Liu & Hu, 1973

Species of amphibian

Limnonectes fragilis (common names: fragile large-headed frog, fragile wart frog) is a species of frog in the family Dicroglossidae. It is endemic to the Hainan Island, China. It is a medium-sized frog, males being 49 mm (1.9 in) and females 52 mm (2.0 in) snout-vent length. Its natural habitats are subtropical or tropical moist lowland forest and rivers. It is threatened by habitat loss.
