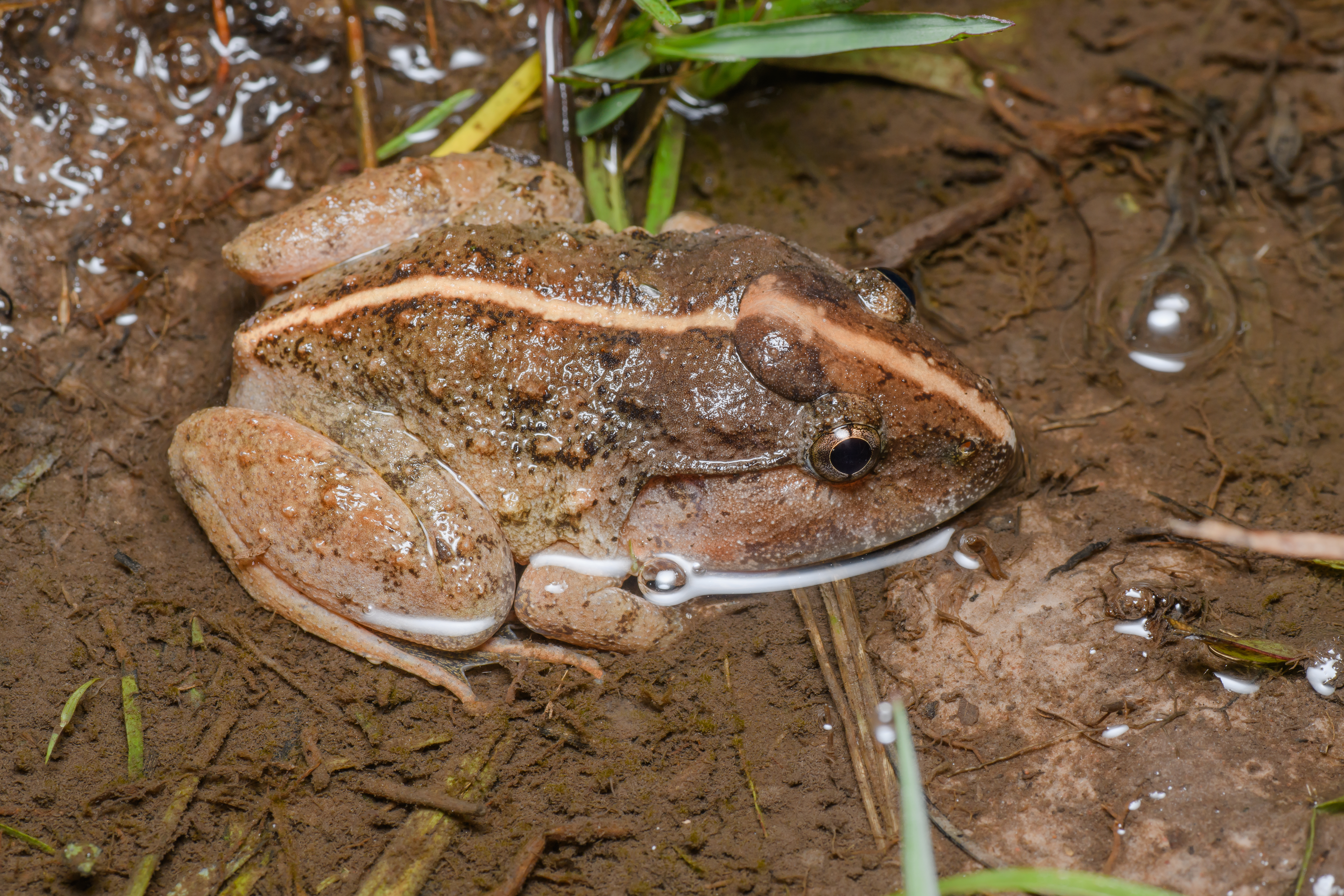
- Limnonectes gyldenstolpei, Phu Kradueng National Park

Conservation status
- Least Concern (IUCN 3.1)

Scientific classification
- Kingdom: Animalia
- Phylum: Chordata
- Class: Amphibia
- Order: Anura
- Family: Dicroglossidae
- Genus: Limnonectes
- Species: L. gyldenstolpei

Binomial name
- Limnonectes gyldenstolpei (Andersson, 1916)

Synonyms
- Elachyglossa gyldenstolpei Andersson, 1916; Rana pileata Boulenger, 1916

= Limnonectes gyldenstolpei =

Species of frog

Limnonectes gyldenstolpei (common name: Gyldenstolpe's frog) is a species of frog in the family Dicroglossidae. It is found in northern Thailand, Laos, and southwestern Cambodia.

== Range and habitat ==
Limnonectes gyldenstolpei has been recorded throughout much of Thailand, northeastern Lao, southwestern Cambodia (including Phnom Samkos Wildlife Sanctuary), and central Vietnam. It has recently also been recorded from the Phong Nha-Kẻ Bàng National Park in central Vietnam.

Its natural habitats are subtropical or tropical moist lowland forest, moist montane forest, rivers, and intermittent rivers. It is not considered threatened by the IUCN.

== Photos ==
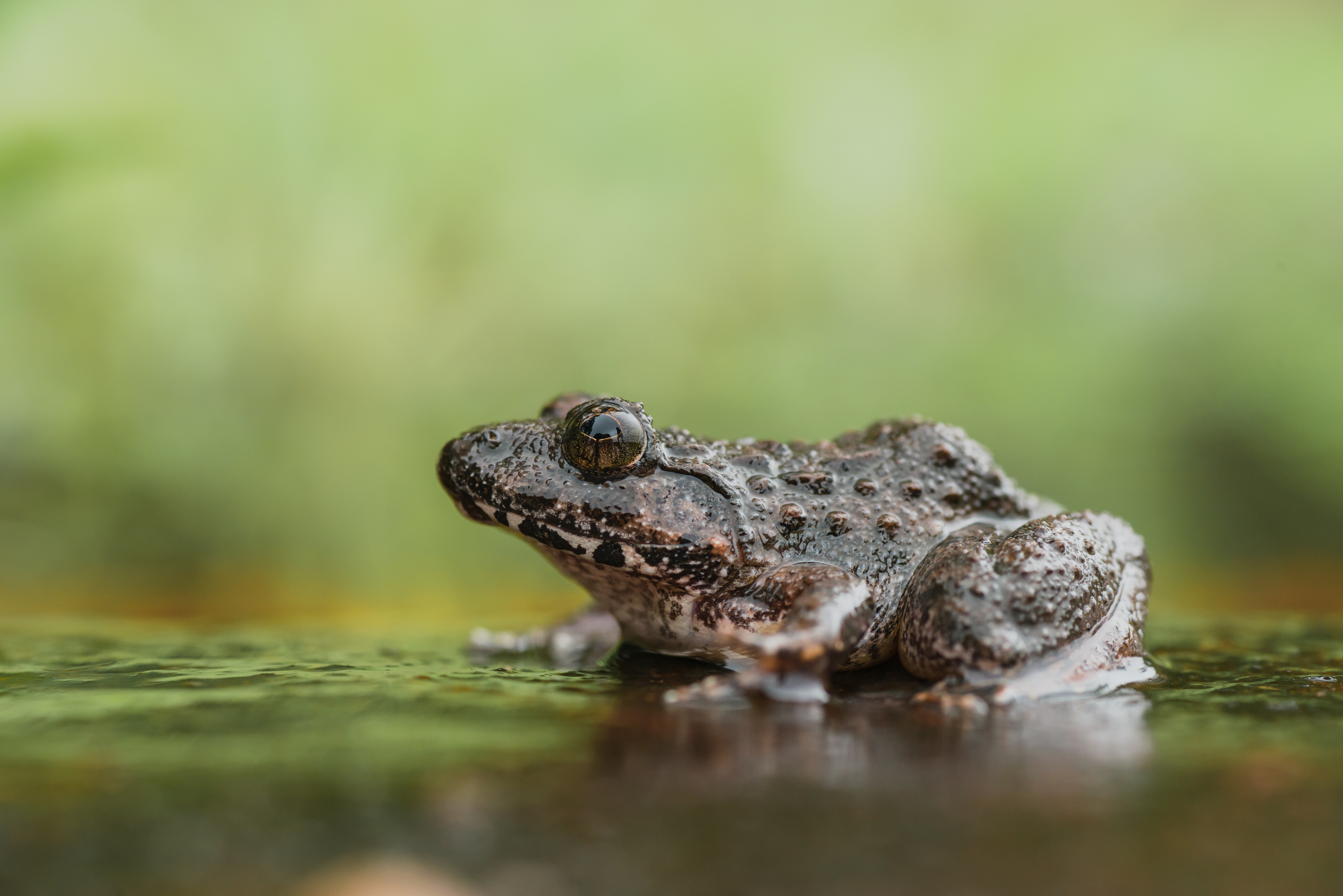
Limnonectes gyldenstolpei (juvenile, female) - Phu Hin Rong Kla National Park

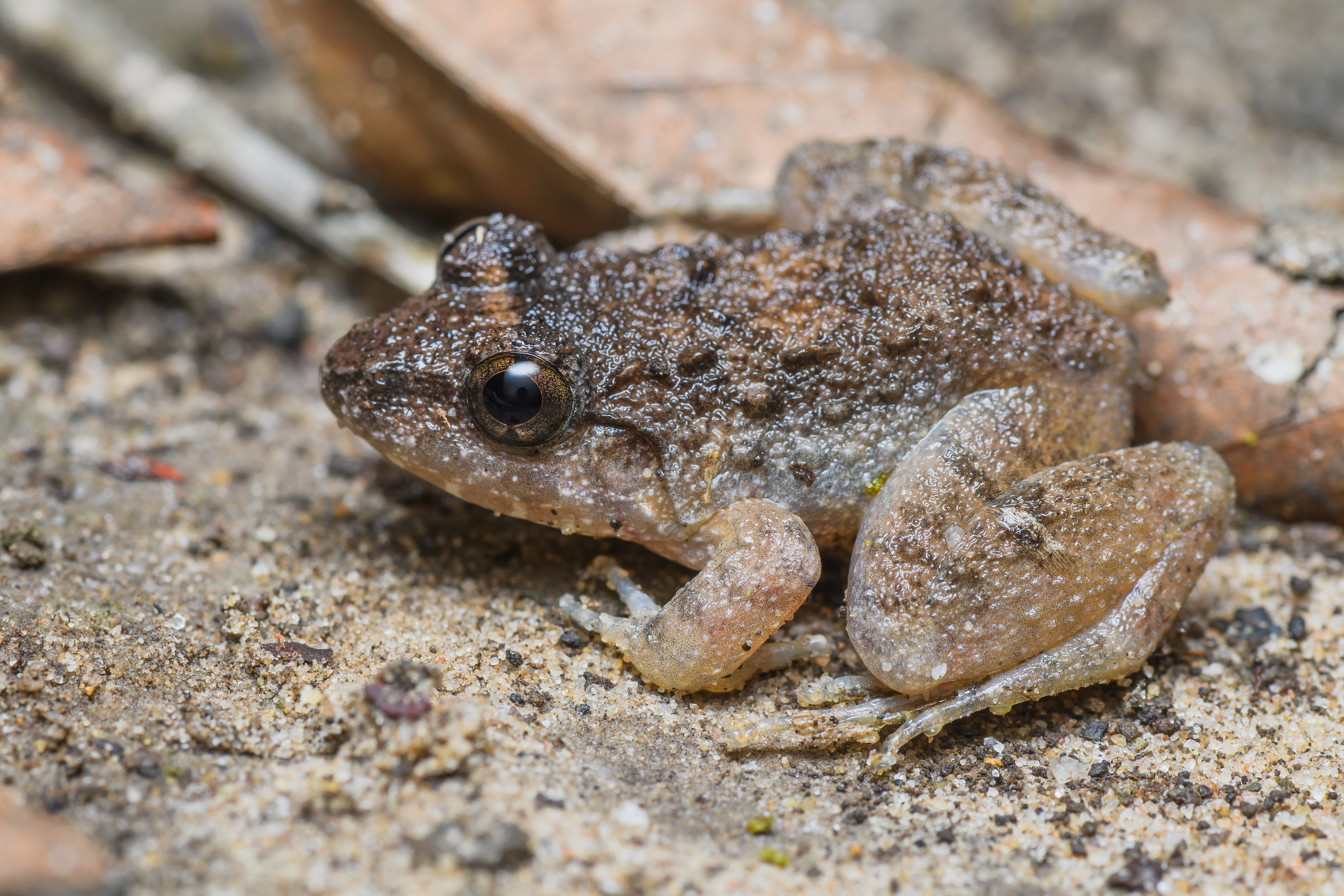
Limnonectes gyldenstolpei (juvenile, female) - Phu Kradueng National Park
