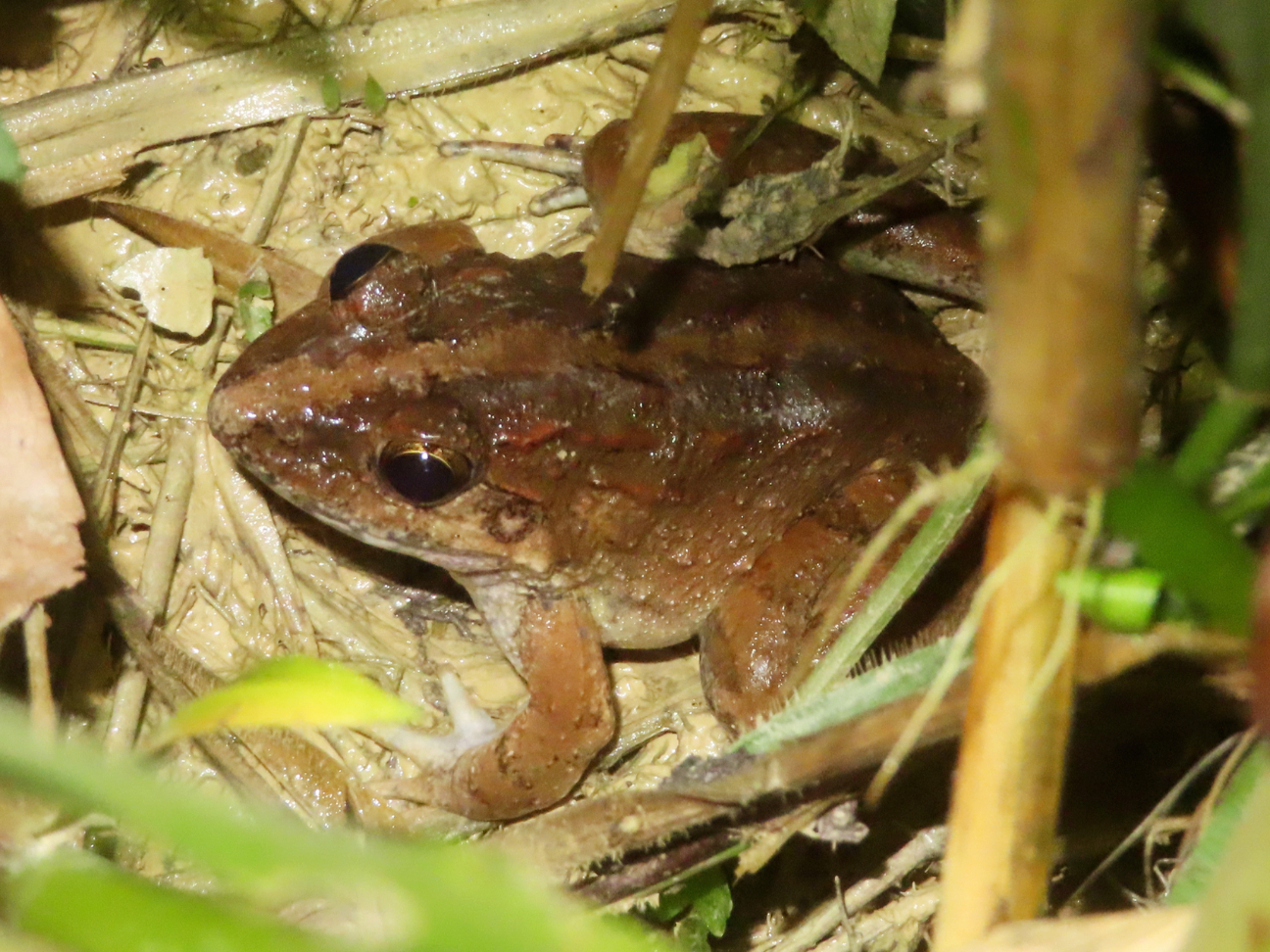

Conservation status
- Near Threatened (IUCN 3.1)

Scientific classification
- Kingdom: Animalia
- Phylum: Chordata
- Class: Amphibia
- Order: Anura
- Family: Dicroglossidae
- Genus: Limnonectes
- Species: L. acanthi

Binomial name
- Limnonectes acanthi (Taylor, 1923)

= Limnonectes acanthi =

Species of frog

Limnonectes acanthi is a species of frog in the family Dicroglossidae. It is endemic to the Philippines. Its natural habitats are subtropical or tropical dry forests, subtropical or tropical moist lowland forests, subtropical or tropical moist montane forests, rivers, intermittent rivers, freshwater marshes, intermittent freshwater marshes, irrigated land, and seasonally flooded agricultural land. It is a common species, but it is threatened by habitat loss. It is also caught for food.
