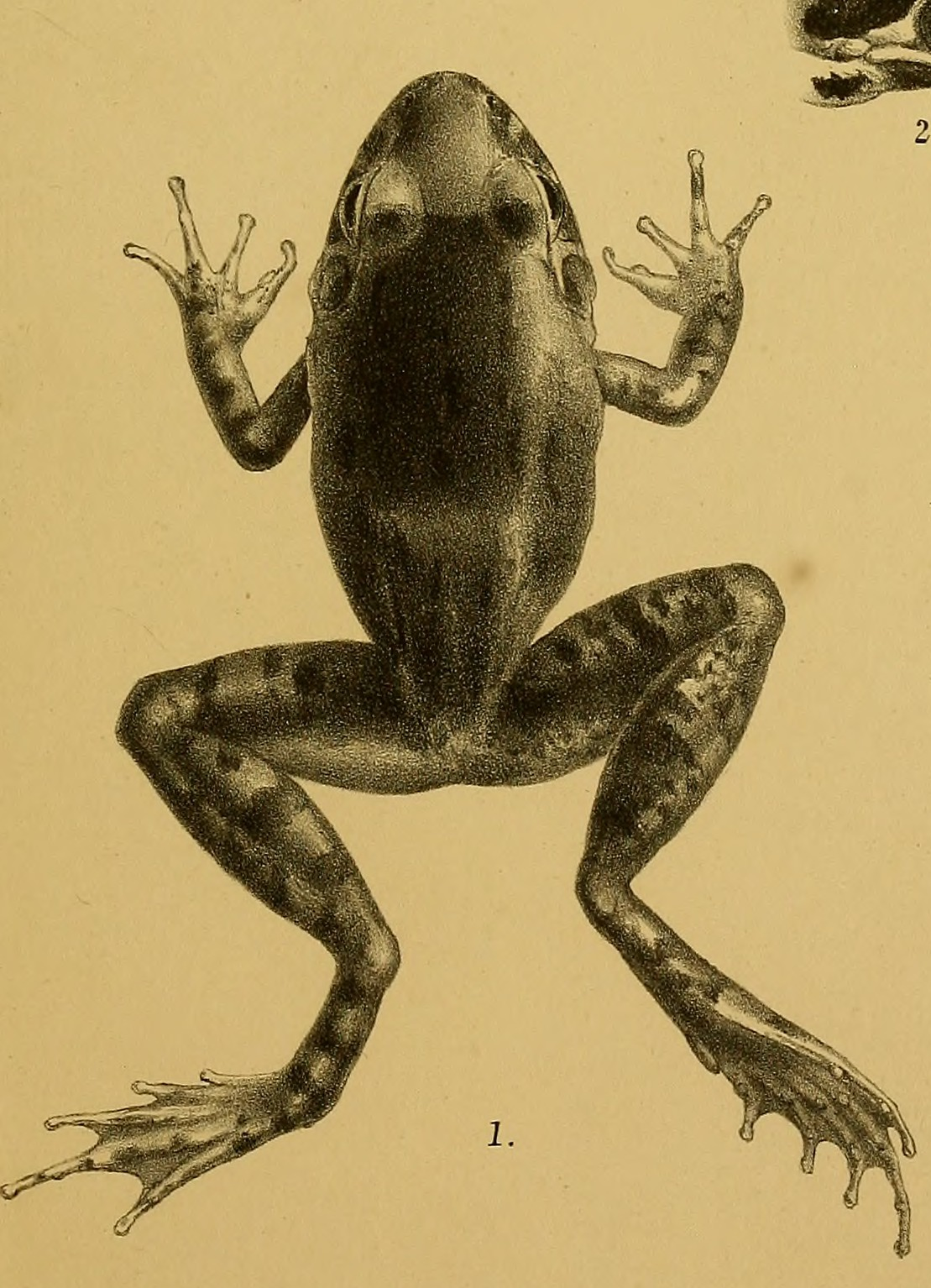

Conservation status
- Least Concern (IUCN 3.1)

Scientific classification
- Kingdom: Animalia
- Phylum: Chordata
- Class: Amphibia
- Order: Anura
- Family: Dicroglossidae
- Genus: Limnonectes
- Species: L. doriae

Binomial name
- Limnonectes doriae (Boulenger, 1887)

Synonyms
- Rana doriae Boulenger, 1887

= Limnonectes doriae =

Species of amphibian

Limnonectes doriae (common name: Burmese wart frog, Doria's frog, or red stream frog) is a species of frog in the family Dicroglossidae found in the Southeast Asia.

== Etymology ==
The specific name doriae commemorates the Italian naturalist Giacomo Doria.

== Distribution and habitat ==
These frogs can be found in Myanmar and western and peninsular Thailand and Peninsular Malaysia, as well as in the Andaman Islands (India). They are terrestrial frogs found in primary tropical forest. Breeding takes place in forest streams where the tadpoles develop. Its conservation status is insufficiently known.
