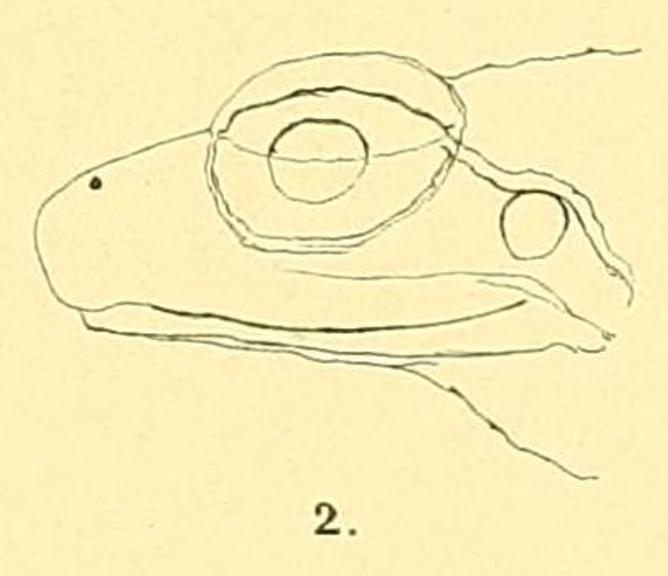

Conservation status
- Endangered (IUCN 3.1)

Scientific classification
- Kingdom: Animalia
- Phylum: Chordata
- Class: Amphibia
- Order: Anura
- Family: Dicroglossidae
- Genus: Limnonectes
- Species: L. microtympanum

Binomial name
- Limnonectes microtympanum (van Kampen, 1907)

Synonyms
- Rana microtympanum Van Kampen, 1907; Rana (Rana) microtympanum Boulenger, 1920; Dicroglossus microtympanum Deckert, 1938; Rana (Eyphlyctis) microtympanm Dubois, 1981 by implication; Euphlyctis microtympanum Poynton and Broadley, 1985 by implication; Limnonectes (Limnonectes) microtympanum Dubois, 1987

= Limnonectes microtympanum =

Species of amphibian

Limnonectes microtympanum (common name: Sulawesi wart frog) is a species of frog in the family Dicroglossidae. It is endemic to Sulawesi, Indonesia, where it is only known from the Moncong Lompobatang mountain at elevations above 1,000 m (3,300 ft).

Limnonectes microtympanum is a common frog within its restricted range. It lives in and around streams in montane forests.
