= Limnonectes finchi =

Conservation status
- Least Concern (IUCN 3.1)

Scientific classification
- Kingdom: Animalia
- Phylum: Chordata
- Class: Amphibia
- Order: Anura
- Family: Dicroglossidae
- Genus: Limnonectes
- Species: L. finchi

Binomial name
- Limnonectes finchi (Inger, 1966)

Synonyms
- Rana microdisca ssp. finchi Inger, 1966

Species of amphibian

Limnonectes finchi, Finch's wart frog, is a species of frog in the family Dicroglossidae endemic to Sabah, Malaysia, but it might well occur in adjacent Kalimantan. Its natural habitats are tropical moist lowland forests. The main potential threat to this species is habitat loss caused by conversion of forests to oil palm plantations. L. finchi shows some parental care: male frogs guard eggs and carry the tadpoles to small rain pools on the forest floor where the rest of larval development occurs.
