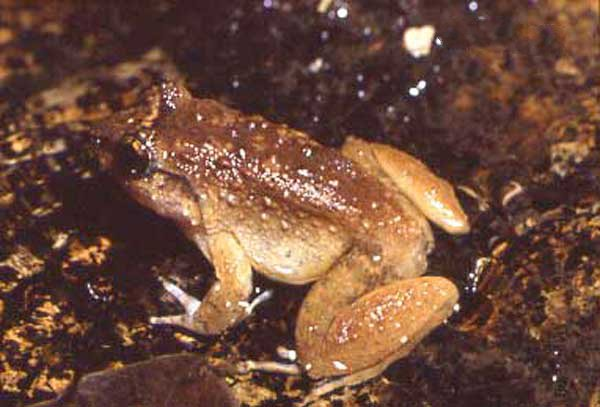

Conservation status
- Least Concern (IUCN 3.1)

Scientific classification
- Kingdom: Animalia
- Phylum: Chordata
- Class: Amphibia
- Order: Anura
- Family: Dicroglossidae
- Genus: Limnonectes
- Species: L. kohchangae

Binomial name
- Limnonectes kohchangae (Smith, 1922)

Synonyms
- Rana kohchangae Smith, 1922

= Koh Chang frog =

Species of amphibian

The Koh Chang frog or Koh Chang wart frog (Limnonectes kohchangae) is a species of frog in the family Dicroglossidae. It is found in east Thailand and southern Cambodia. Records from Laos and Vietnam represent other species.

More recent taxonomic records place the species in southeastern Myanmar, eastern and southern Thailand, southern Cambodia, and southern Vietnam, populations formerly attributed to it in Laos have been reassigned to the distinct species Limnonectes coffeatus.

Limnonectes kohchangae inhabit evergreen hill forests as well as modified habitats such as gardens and plantations. They breed in slow-moving sections of streams but outside the breeding season are found dispersed on the forest floor. There are no major threats to this species; it is not considered threatened by the IUCN.
