= Malesian frog =

Conservation status
- Least Concern (IUCN 3.1)

Scientific classification
- Kingdom: Animalia
- Phylum: Chordata
- Class: Amphibia
- Order: Anura
- Family: Dicroglossidae
- Genus: Limnonectes
- Species: L. malesianus

Binomial name
- Limnonectes malesianus (Kiew, 1984)

Species of amphibian

The Malesian frog, Malaysian river frog, Malaysian peat frog, or peat swamp frog (Limnonectes malesianus) is a species of frog in the family Dicroglossidae. It is found on the Malay Peninsula (including extreme southern peninsular Thailand and Singapore), Sumatra, Java, Borneo (Indonesia, Malaysia and Brunei), and a range of islands on the Sunda Shelf (Pulau Kundur, Palau Gallang, Great Natuna Island, Sinkeo Island). Its natural habitats are shallow, gentle streams and nearby swampy areas including peat swamps, very flat alluvial forests, and overgrown plantations. It is becoming rare due to habitat loss (deforestation), and to a lesser extent, exploitation.
