= Limnonectes ingeri =

Conservation status
- Least Concern (IUCN 3.1)

Scientific classification
- Kingdom: Animalia
- Phylum: Chordata
- Class: Amphibia
- Order: Anura
- Family: Dicroglossidae
- Genus: Limnonectes
- Species: L. ingeri

Binomial name
- Limnonectes ingeri (Kiew, 1978)

Synonyms
- Rana ingeri Kiew, 1978

Species of amphibian

Limnonectes ingeri (common names: Inger's wart frog, greater swamp frog) is a species of frog in the family Dicroglossidae. The species is native to the island of Borneo and associated islets.

== Etymology ==
The specific name, ingeri, is in honor of American herpetologist Robert F. Inger.

== Geographic range ==
On the island of Borneo, L. ingeri is found in Brunei, Indonesia, and Malaysia.

== Habitat ==
The natural habitats of L. ingeri are tropical moist lowland forests, rivers, and swamps.

== Diet ==
Adults of L. ingeri prey upon relatively large animals such as other frogs and small reptiles.

== Conservation status ==
L. ingeri is seriously affected by habitat loss, and locally also by collection for food.
