= Limnonectes dabanus =

Conservation status
- Least Concern (IUCN 3.1)

Scientific classification
- Kingdom: Animalia
- Phylum: Chordata
- Class: Amphibia
- Order: Anura
- Family: Dicroglossidae
- Genus: Limnonectes
- Species: L. dabanus

Binomial name
- Limnonectes dabanus (Smith, 1922)

Synonyms
- Rana macrognathus ssp. dabana Smith, 1922; Rana toumanoffi Bourret, 1941; Limnonectes toumanoffi

Species of amphibian

Limnonectes dabanus (sometimes known as Annam wart frog) is a species of frog in the family Dicroglossidae. It is found in Cambodia and Vietnam. Its natural habitats are tropical moist lowland forests, rivers, and swamps. Its status is insufficiently known.
