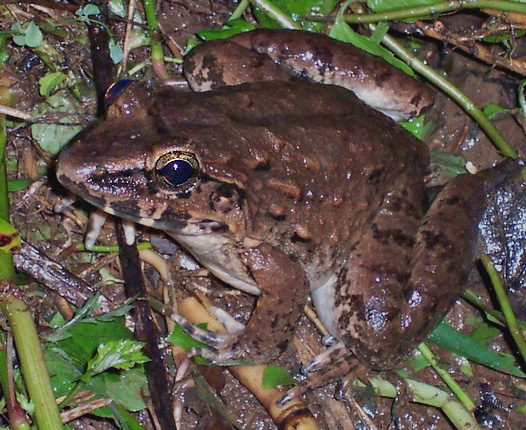

Conservation status
- Least Concern (IUCN 3.1)

Scientific classification
- Kingdom: Animalia
- Phylum: Chordata
- Class: Amphibia
- Order: Anura
- Family: Dicroglossidae
- Genus: Limnonectes
- Species: L. macrodon

Binomial name
- Limnonectes macrodon (Duméril & Bibron, 1841)

= Fanged river frog =

Species of amphibian

The fanged river frog, Javan giant frog, Malaya wart frog, or stone creek frog (Limnonectes macrodon) is a species of frog in the family Dicroglossidae endemic to Sumatra and Java, Indonesia. Records from other regions are probably caused by misidentifying other species such as Limnonectes blythii as this species.

L. macrodon frogs live in forested areas near streams; they breed in streams. Their lowland forest habitat is declining in both the extent and quality, and this once common species is getting uncommon. It is widely collected for human consumption in Java, Indonesia, along with the crab-eating frog (Fejervarya cancrivora).
