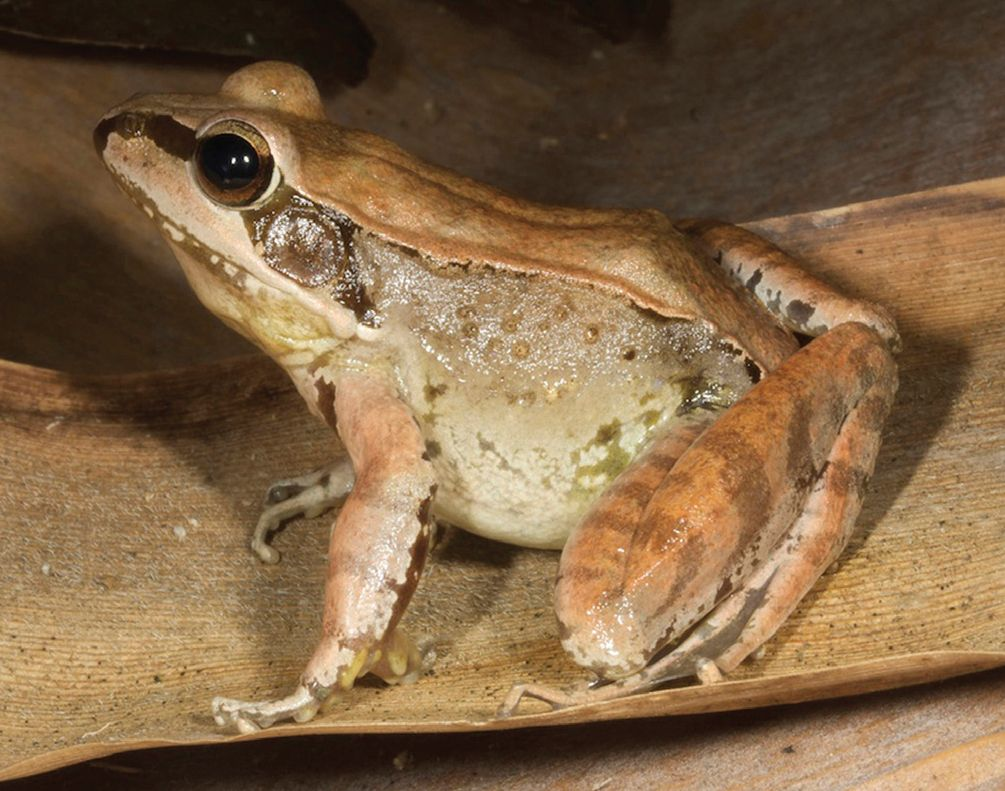
- Female Limnonectes timorensis found near Eraulo, Ermera District, East Timor

Scientific classification
- Domain: Eukaryota
- Kingdom: Animalia
- Phylum: Chordata
- Class: Amphibia
- Order: Anura
- Family: Dicroglossidae
- Genus: Limnonectes
- Species: L. timorensis

Binomial name
- Limnonectes timorensis (Smith, 1927)

Synonyms
- Rana timorensis Smith, 1927

= Limnonectes timorensis =

Species of amphibian

Limnonectes timorensis (common name: Timor river frog and Timor wart frog) is a species of frogs in the family Dicroglossidae. It is endemic to the island of Timor at the eastern end of the Lesser Sunda Islands. In Timor-Leste, it is an infrequent species associated with rivers in tropical montane forests above 1000 m altitude.

== Description ==
This species has a brown band on its head that starts near the tip of its snout, continues along the canthus rostralis, and through the eye, and then completely envelops the tympanum. It has warts on its skin that are normally located in a concentration on the dorsum. The fingertips of this species are somewhat swollen and wide at the tips. However, they do not have a marginal fold outlining the disk pad. The first finger is always longer than the second. There is a dorsolateral fold that starts from just behind the eye, and runs dorsally to the groin. The tympanum is almost equal in size to the eye.
