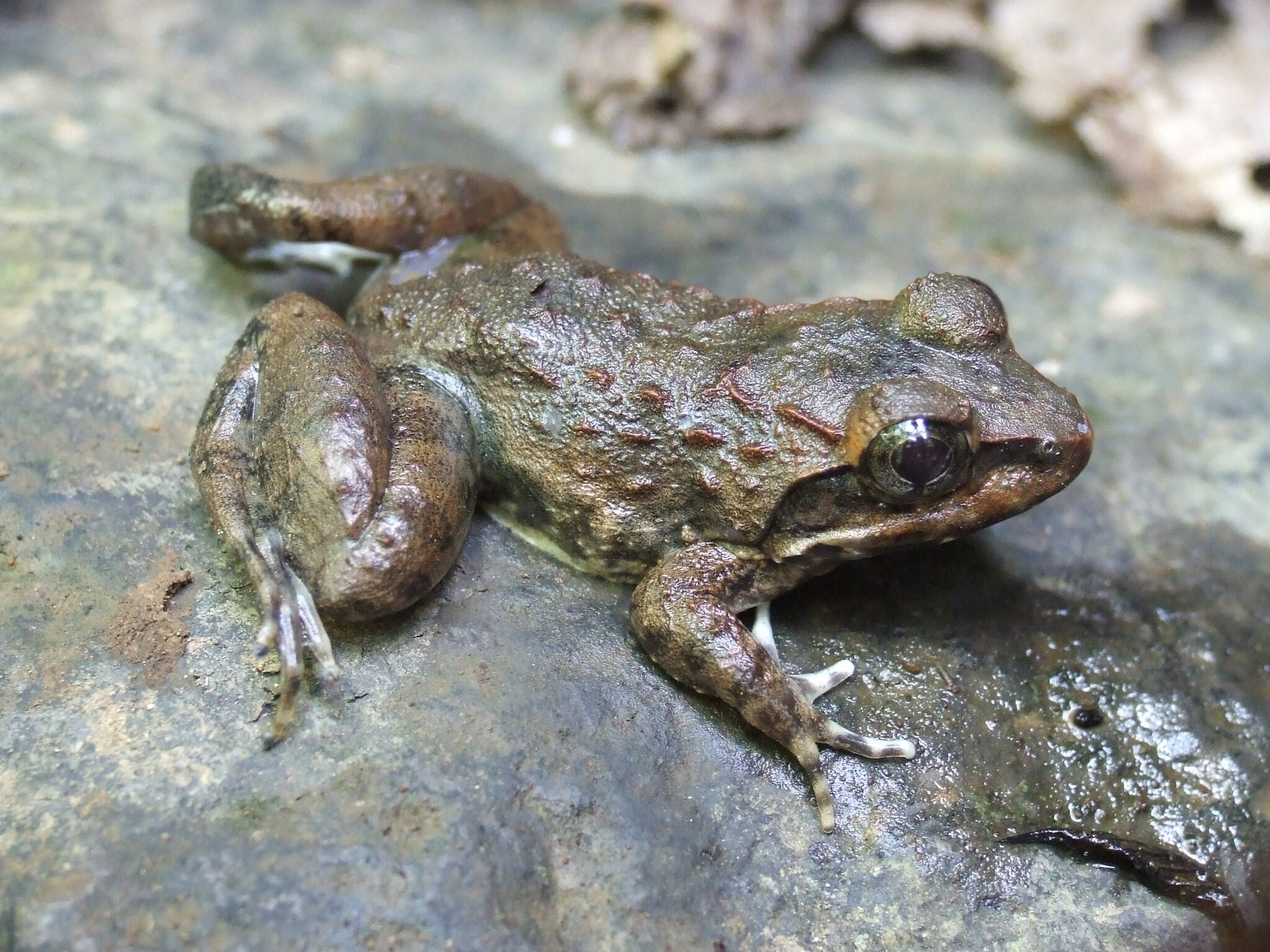

Conservation status
- Vulnerable (IUCN 3.1)

Scientific classification
- Kingdom: Animalia
- Phylum: Chordata
- Class: Amphibia
- Order: Anura
- Family: Dicroglossidae
- Genus: Limnonectes
- Species: L. diuatus

Binomial name
- Limnonectes diuatus (Brown & Alcala, 1977)

Synonyms
- Rana diuta Brown & Alcala, 1977

= Eastern Mindanao frog =

Species of amphibian

The Eastern Mindanao frog or Tagibo wart frog (Limnonectes diuatus) is a species of frog in the family Dicroglossidae. It is endemic to the Philippines, where it occurs in the mountains of Mindanao.

This frog lives in streams and rivers in rainforest habitat. It is common, but it is considered to be vulnerable due to habitat loss and degradation. Agricultural operations lead to deforestation in the area and the waterways are polluted.
