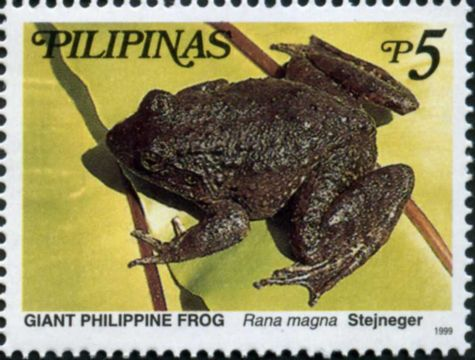

Conservation status
- Near Threatened (IUCN 3.1)

Scientific classification
- Kingdom: Animalia
- Phylum: Chordata
- Class: Amphibia
- Order: Anura
- Family: Dicroglossidae
- Genus: Limnonectes
- Species: L. magnus

Binomial name
- Limnonectes magnus (Stejneger, 1910)

Synonyms
- Rana magna Stejneger, 1910

= Giant Philippine frog =

Species of frog in the family Dicroglossidae endemic to the Philippines

The giant Philippine frog, large swamp frog, or Mindanao fanged frog (Limnonectes magnus) is a species of frog in the family Dicroglossidae. It is endemic to the Philippines. Its natural habitats are tropical moist lowland forests, subtropical or tropical moist montane forests, rivers, intermittent rivers, freshwater marshes, and intermittent freshwater marshes. It is becoming rare due to habitat loss.
