= List of amphibians of Malaysia =

The amphibians of Malaysia are relatively diverse.

== Species ==
- Abavorana luctuosa (mahogany frog)
- Amolops larutensis (Larut sucker frog)
- Ansonia albomaculata (white-lipped slender toad)
- Ansonia endauensis
- Ansonia hanitschi (Kadamaian stream toad)
- Ansonia latidisca (Bornean rainbow toad)
- Ansonia minuta (tiny stream toad)
- Ansonia torrentis (torrent slender toad)
- Chaperina fusca (spiny-heeled froglet)
- Chirixalus nongkhorensis (Nongkhor foam-nest treefrog)
- Duttaphrynus melanostictus (Asian common toad)
- Fejervarya cancrivora (crab-eating frog)
- Fejervarya limnocharis (rice field frog)
- Fejervarya pulla
- Glyphoglossus brooksii (Brooks' squat frog)
- Glyphoglossus flavus (Borneo squat frog)
- Glyphoglossus guttulatus (Burmese squat frog)
- Glyphoglossus volzi (Sumatra squat frog)
- Hoplobatrachus rugulosus (Chinese edible frog)
- Huia cavitympanum (hole-in-the-head frog)
- Humerana miopus (three-striped frog)
- Hylarana erythraea (common green frog)
- Hylarana glandulosa (glandular frog)
- Hylarana macrodactyla (marbled slender frog)
- Ichthyophis asplenius (broad-striped caecilian)
- Ichthyophis atricollaris (Long Bloee caecilian)
- Ichthyophis biangularis (angular caecilian)
- Ichthyophis dulitensis (Mount Dulit caecilian)
- Ichthyophis larutensis (Larut Hills caecilian)
- Ichthyophis monochrous (Western Borneo caecilian)
- Ichthyophis nigroflavus (Kuala Lumpur caecilian)
- Ingerana tenasserimensis (pale-headed frog)
- Ingerophrynus divergens
- Ingerophrynus gollum (Gollum's toad)
- Ingerophrynus kumquat
- Ingerophrynus macrotis
- Ingerophrynus parvus
- Ingerophrynus quadriporcatus (long-glanded toad)
- Kaloula pulchra (banded bullfrog)
- Kurixalus appendiculatus (frilled tree frog)
- Leptobrachella arayai
- Leptobrachella baluensis (Kinabalu dwarf litter frog)
- Leptobrachella brevicrus (Dring's Borneo frog)
- Leptobrachella kajangensis (Kajang slender litter frog)
- Leptobrachella mjobergi (Mjöberg's dwarf litter frog)
- Leptobrachella palmata (palm dwarf litter frog)
- Leptobrachella parva (Gunung Mulu Borneo frog)
- Leptobrachella picta
- Leptobrachella serasanae (Serasan Borneo frog)
- Leptobrachium hendricksoni (spotted litter frog)
- Leptobrachium smithi (Smith's litter frog)
- Leptolalax dringi (Dring's Asian toad)
- Leptolalax gracilis
- Leptolalax hamidi
- Leptolalax heteropus (variable litter frog)
- Leptolalax kecil
- Leptolalax maurus
- Leptomantis angulirostris (masked tree frog)
- Limnonectes blythii (Blyth's river frog)
- Limnonectes doriae (Burmese wart frog)
- Limnonectes finchi (Finch's wart frog)
- Limnonectes hascheanus
- Limnonectes ibanorum
- Limnonectes ingeri (Inger's wart frog)
- Limnonectes kenepaiensis (Kenepai wart frog)
- Limnonectes khasianus (corrugated frog)
- Limnonectes kuhlii (Kuhl's creek frog)
- Limnonectes leporinus (giant river frog)
- Limnonectes malesianus (Malesian frog)
- Limnonectes nitidus (Tanah Rata wart frog)
- Limnonectes tweediei (Tweedie's wart frog)
- Megophrys kobayashii (Kobayashi's horned frog)
- Megophrys nasuta (long-nosed horned frog)
- Meristogenys jerboa (western torrent frog)
- Meristogenys macrophthalmus (large-eyed torrent frog)
- Meristogenys orphnocnemis (dusky-footed torrent frog)
- Meristogenys whiteheadi (Whitehead's torrent frog)
- Microhyla berdmorei (Berdmore's chorus frog)
- Microhyla butleri (painted chorus frog)
- Microhyla fissipes (ornate chorus frog)
- Microhyla heymonsi (dark-sided chorus frog)
- Microhyla mantheyi (Manthey's narrow-mouthed frog)
- Microhyla palmipes (palmated chorus frog)
- Microhyla superciliaris (Batu Cave rice frog)
- Micryletta inornata
- Occidozyga baluensis (seep frog)
- Occidozyga martensii (rough-tongued floating frog)
- Occidozyga lima (green puddle frog)
- Odorrana hosii (Hose's frog)
- Odorrana monjerai
- Pelobatrachus edwardinae
- Pelophryne guentheri
- Philautus amoenus
- Philautus aurantium (Mendolong bubble-nest frog)
- Philautus bunitus
- Philautus disgregus (disparate bubble-nest frog)
- Philautus erythrophthalmus
- Philautus gunungensis
- Philautus petersi
- Philautus saueri
- Phrynoidis asper (Asian giant toad)
- Pulchrana banjarana
- Pulchrana baramica (Baram river frog)
- Pulchrana laterimaculata (side-spotted swamp frog)
- Pulchrana picturata (spotted stream frog)
- Pulchrana siberu (Siberut Island frog)
- Pulchrana signata (variable-backed frog)
- Raorchestes parvulus (tiny bubble-nest frog)
- Rhacophorus baluensis (Balu flying frog)
- Rhacophorus bipunctatus
- Rhacophorus nigropalmatus (Wallace's flying frog)
- Rhacophorus pardalis (harlequin tree frog)
- Staurois latopalmatus (rock skipper)
- Sylvirana nigrovittata (sapgreen stream frog)
- Theloderma asperum (hill garden bug-eyed frog)
- Theloderma leporosum (Malaya bug-eyed frog)
- Xenophrys aceras (Perak horned toad)
- Xenophrys baluensis (Kinabalu horned frog)
- Xenophrys dringi (Dring's horned toad)
- Xenophrys longipes (slender-legged horned frog)
