= Leptobrachella pelodytoides =

Conservation status
- Data Deficient (IUCN 3.1)

Scientific classification
- Kingdom: Animalia
- Phylum: Chordata
- Class: Amphibia
- Order: Anura
- Family: Megophryidae
- Genus: Leptobrachella
- Species: L. pelodytoides

Binomial name
- Leptobrachella pelodytoides (Boulenger, 1893)

Synonyms
- Leptobrachium pelodytoides Boulenger, 1893; Megalophrys pelodytoides Boulenger, 1908; Megophrys pelodytoides Gee & Boring, 1929; Leptobrachium (Leptolalax) pelodytoides Dubois, 1980; Carpophrys pelodytoides Huang, 1990; Leptolalax (Lalax) pelodytoides Delorme, Dubois, Grosjean, and Ohler, 2006; Paramegophrys pelodytoides Fei, Hu, Ye, and Huang, 2009; Leptolalax (Lalos) pelodytoides Dubois, Grosjean, Ohler, Adler, and Zhao, 2010

Species of amphibian

Leptobrachella pelodytoides, with common names including the Thao Asian toad, Myanmar litter toad, and Karin toadfrog, among others, is a frog species in the family Megophryidae. It occurs near its type locality in the Karen Hills region in the Kayah State, eastern Myanmar, as well as the southern Yunnan province of China and in several regions of Thailand.

As Leptobrachella pelodytoides was one of the first megophryid species to be described from the region, later research has shown that many specimens that have been reported as L. pelodytoides represent other species, including Leptobrachella bourreti, Leptobrachella oshanensis, Leptobrachella eos, and Leptobrachella minima.

== Description ==
Leptobrachella pelodytoides is large for its genus: males measure 28–32 mm (1.1–1.3 in) and females 36–38 mm (1.4–1.5 in) in snout-vent length. Their back is brown with indistinct darker outline on warts and foldings and sides are with large dark blackish spots.
