= Leptobrachella aerea =

Conservation status
- Least Concern (IUCN 3.1)

Scientific classification
- Kingdom: Animalia
- Phylum: Chordata
- Class: Amphibia
- Order: Anura
- Family: Megophryidae
- Genus: Leptobrachella
- Species: L. aerea

Binomial name
- Leptobrachella aerea (Rowley, Stuart, Richards, Phimmachak, and Sivongxay, 2010)

Synonyms
- Leptolalax aereus Rowley et al., 2010

Species of amphibian

Leptobrachella aerea is a species of frogs in the family Megophryidae. It is known from Vilabouli District, Savannakhet Province, Laos (where its type locality is) and from Hà Tĩnh, Nghệ An, Thanh Hóa, and Quảng Bình Provinces of Vietnam.

== Description ==
Leptobrachella aerea males measure 25–33 mm (0.98–1.30 in) and females 27–39 mm (1.1–1.5 in) in snout-vent length. It is morphologically most similar to Leptobrachella oshanensis. Male L. aerea have been found to be calling from crevices between boulders, on rocks, and on stream banks in both June and November, suggesting that breeding may occur throughout the year. To the human ear, this call is a high-pitched, rapid chirping.

Specimens collected from Vietnam were slightly different and seem to represent two other lineages.

== Habitat and conservation ==
Leptobrachella aerea inhabits rocky streams and adjacent areas in evergreen and semi-evergreen forest at altitudes of about 200–511 m (656–1,677 ft). It some degree of habitat degradation, but probably requires that some evergreen or semi-evergreen riparian vegetation remains. It is known from several protected areas in Vietnam: Phong Nha-Ke Bang National Park, Pu Huong Nature Reserve, Ky Anh-Ke Go Reserve, and Xuan Lien Nature Reserve.
