= Leptobrachella melica =

Conservation status
- Endangered (IUCN 3.1)

Scientific classification
- Kingdom: Animalia
- Phylum: Chordata
- Class: Amphibia
- Order: Anura
- Family: Megophryidae
- Genus: Leptobrachella
- Species: L. melica

Binomial name
- Leptobrachella melica (Rowley, Stuart, Thy, and Emmett, 2010)

Synonyms
- Leptolalax melicus Rowley et al. 2010

Species of amphibian

Leptobrachella melica (musical leaf-litter toad or Virachey litter toad; Khmer: កង្កែបស្លឹកមេលីកឺស, kangkaep slaek melikeus) is a frog species in the family Megophryidae. It is endemic to Cambodia where it is only known from near its type locality, Virachey National Park, Ratanakiri Province; it is expected to have a wider distribution that may reach Laos and Vietnam. Leptobrachella melica have only been found near rocky streams in evergreen forest between 650–850 m (2,130–2,790 ft) altitude.

== Description ==
L. melica is a small species even among the generally small members of its genus: seven adult males were recorded to measure 20–23 mm (0.79–0.91 in) in snout-vent length. It is morphologically similar to Leptobrachella applebyi. The advertisement call of male L. melica is unique, consisting of a single long introductory note containing 8–50 pulses, followed by 3–11 predominantly single-pulsed notes.
