= Leptobrachella kecil =

Conservation status
- Critically Endangered (IUCN 3.1)

Scientific classification
- Kingdom: Animalia
- Phylum: Chordata
- Class: Amphibia
- Order: Anura
- Family: Megophryidae
- Genus: Leptobrachella
- Species: L. kecil

Binomial name
- Leptobrachella kecil (Matsui, Daicus, Norhayati, and Yong, 2009)

Synonyms
- Leptolalax kecil Matsui, Daicus, Norhayati, and Yong, 2009

Species of amphibian

Leptobrachella kecil is a species of megophryid frogs found in the Cameron Highlands of Peninsular Malaysia. It is only known from its type locality, but it is expected to have a wider distribution in the Cameron Highlands. This species may have been erroneously identified as Leptobrachella gracilis.

== Description ==
Leptobrachella kecil is a small-sized toad, similar in size to L. pluvialis. Males recorded were 19–21 mm (0.75–0.83 in) in snout-vent length and one female was 25 mm (0.98 in). Male L. kecil call at night on the ground near streams. The call differs from those known in other species of its genus: male emits only one short, clearly pulsed call at a time, in contrast to long, successive notes of other species.

== Conservation ==
The species has been assessed as critically endangered by the IUCN due to its single location of occurrence, which has a very small area, (10 km²) being threatened by agricultural development.
