= Leptobrachella bondangensis =

Scientific classification
- Kingdom: Animalia
- Phylum: Chordata
- Class: Amphibia
- Order: Anura
- Family: Megophryidae
- Genus: Leptobrachella
- Species: L. bondangensis

Binomial name
- Leptobrachella bondangensis Eto, Matsui, Hamidy, Munir, and Iskandar, 2018
- Leptobrachella bondangensis is only known from Mount Bondang, Central Kalimantan, Borneo

Species of frog

Leptobrachella bondangensis is a species of frog in the family Megophryidae. It is endemic to Central Kalimantan, in the Indonesian part of Borneo, and is only known from its eponymous type locality, Mount Bondang (local name: Gunung Bondang) in the Murung Raya Regency. Common name Bondang dwarf litter frog has been coined for this species.

== Description ==
The type series consists of two individuals: the holotype is an adult male measuring 18 mm (0.7 in) in snout–vent length—relatively large for its genus—while the paratype is an immature individual, probably a female, measuring 16 mm (0.6 in). The overall appearance is moderately slender. The head is longer than it is wide. The snout is rounded. The eyes are relatively large. The tympanum is distinct but small, nearly ⅓ of the eye diameter; a low supratympanic ridge is present. The forelimbs are slender while the hindlimbs are moderately short. The fingers and toes have sharply-pointed tips; the fingers have no webbing while the toes have basal webbing as well as weak lateral fringes. Skin is ventrally smooth and dorsally nearly so; the flanks are slightly granular with scattered tubercles/glands. The alcohol-preserved specimens are dorsally grayish‐brown to pale-brown. Some darker markings are present, including an inverted W‐shaped mark on the shoulder. The ventral parts are pale gray with dark mottling. The limbs bear dark crossbars dorsally. The holotype male has a bipartite subgular vocal sac.

== Habitat and conservation ==
The type specimens were collected from the bank of a clear, fast flowing rocky stream in a hilly dipterocarp forest at 545 m (1,788 ft) above sea level. The holotype male was calling on a grass near the ground. More than 20 other frog species could be found at this same locality, including the congeneric Leptobrachella cf. juliandringi.

This species is only known from a small number of specimens from a single locality. As of late 2020, it had not yet been assessed for the IUCN Red List of Threatened Species.
