= Leptobrachella kalonensis =

Conservation status
- Endangered (IUCN 3.1)

Scientific classification
- Kingdom: Animalia
- Phylum: Chordata
- Class: Amphibia
- Order: Anura
- Family: Megophryidae
- Genus: Leptobrachella
- Species: L. kalonensis

Binomial name
- Leptobrachella kalonensis (Rowley, Tran, Le, Dau, Peloso, Nguyen, Hoang, Nguyen, and Ziegler, 2016)

Synonyms
- Leptolalax kalonensis Rowley, Tran, Le, Dau, Peloso, Nguyen, Hoang, Nguyen, and Ziegler, 2016

Species of frog

Leptobrachella kalonensis is a species of frog in the family Megophryidae. It is endemic to Vietnam.

== Taxonomy ==
Jodi J. L. Rowley and colleagues described this species in 2016. The holotype was deposited at the Institute of Ecology and Biological Resources (IEBR) in Hanoi. Paratypes were deposited at IEBR as well as the American Museum of Natural History.

== Etymology ==
The specific epithet kalonensis refers to species's type locality, which was near a village formerly called Kalon.

== Distribution ==
As of 2021, this species has only been recorded in the Song Luy Watershed Forest, in Bình Thuận Province, Vietnam. It probably has a wider distribution, however.
