= Leptobrachella botsfordi =

Conservation status
- Critically Endangered (IUCN 3.1)

Scientific classification
- Kingdom: Animalia
- Phylum: Chordata
- Class: Amphibia
- Order: Anura
- Family: Megophryidae
- Genus: Leptobrachella
- Species: L. botsfordi

Binomial name
- Leptobrachella botsfordi (Rowley, Dau, and Nguyen, 2013)

Synonyms
- Leptolalax botsfordi Rowley, Dau, and Nguyen, 2013

Species of frog

Leptobrachella botsfordi, commonly called Botsford's leaf-litter frog or Botsford's litter toad, is a species of frog in the family Megophryidae. It is endemic to Mount Fansipan, in Hoang Lien National Park, northern Vietnam.
