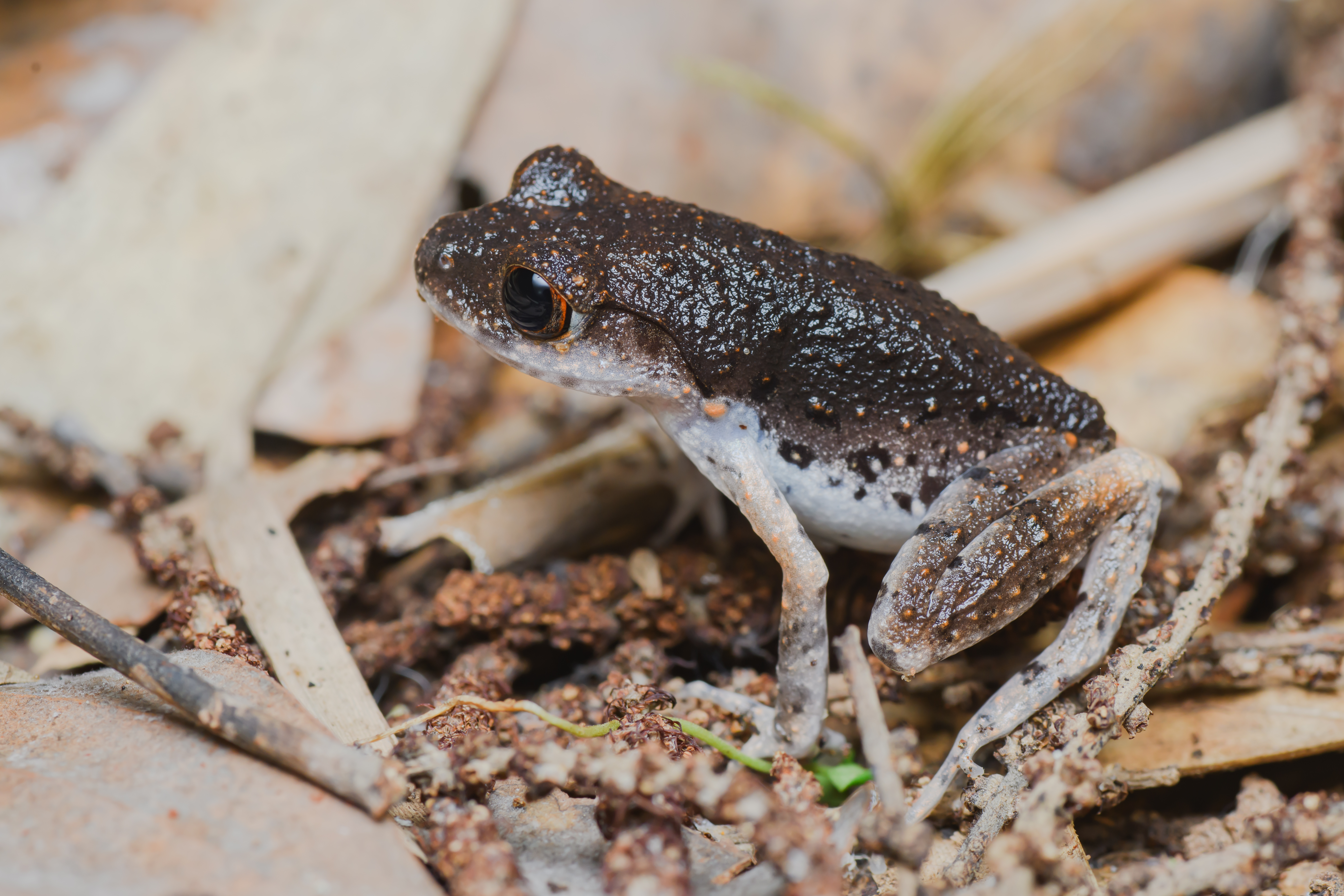

Conservation status
- Least Concern (IUCN 3.1)

Scientific classification
- Kingdom: Animalia
- Phylum: Chordata
- Class: Amphibia
- Order: Anura
- Family: Megophryidae
- Genus: Leptobrachella
- Species: L. fuliginosa

Binomial name
- Leptobrachella fuliginosa (Matsui, 2006)

Synonyms
- Leptolalax fuliginosus Matsui, 2006

= Leptobrachella fuliginosa =

Species of amphibian

Leptobrachella fuliginosa is a frog species in the family Megophryidae. It is endemic to Thailand where it is only known from its type locality, Pa Lao U in Prachuap Khiri Khan Province. Only four specimens were collected, all of them males, measuring 28–30 mm (1.1–1.2 in) in snout-vent length.

This species was moved from the defunct genus Leptolalax to Leptobrachella following phylogenetic analyses in 2021.
