= Leptobrachella pyrrhops =

Conservation status
- Endangered (IUCN 3.1)

Scientific classification
- Kingdom: Animalia
- Phylum: Chordata
- Class: Amphibia
- Order: Anura
- Family: Megophryidae
- Genus: Leptobrachella
- Species: L. pyrrhops

Binomial name
- Leptobrachella pyrrhops (Poyarkov, Rowley, Gogoleva, Vassilieva, Galoyan, and Orlov, 2015)

Synonyms
- Leptolalax pyrrhops Poyarkov, Rowley, Gogoleva, Vassilieva, Galoyan, and Orlov, 2015

Species of amphibian

Leptobrachella pyrrhops, commonly called the orange-eyed litter toad, is a species of frog in the family Megophryidae. The species is endemic to Vietnam, found only in the Loc Bac Forest of Lam Dong.
