= Leptobrachella isos =

Conservation status
- Vulnerable (IUCN 3.1)

Scientific classification
- Kingdom: Animalia
- Phylum: Chordata
- Class: Amphibia
- Order: Anura
- Family: Megophryidae
- Genus: Leptobrachella
- Species: L. isos

Binomial name
- Leptobrachella isos (Rowley, Stuart, Neang, Hoang, Dau, Nguyen, and Emmett, 2015)

Synonyms
- Leptolalax isos Rowley, Stuart, Neang, Hoang, Dau, Nguyen, and Emmett, 2015

Species of amphibian

Leptobrachella isos, commonly called the similar litter toad, is a species of frog in the family Megophryidae. It inhabits forests between 650–1,100 m (2,130–3,610 ft) in elevation on the Kon Tum Plateau of Vietnam and Cambodia. It may also be present in Laos.
