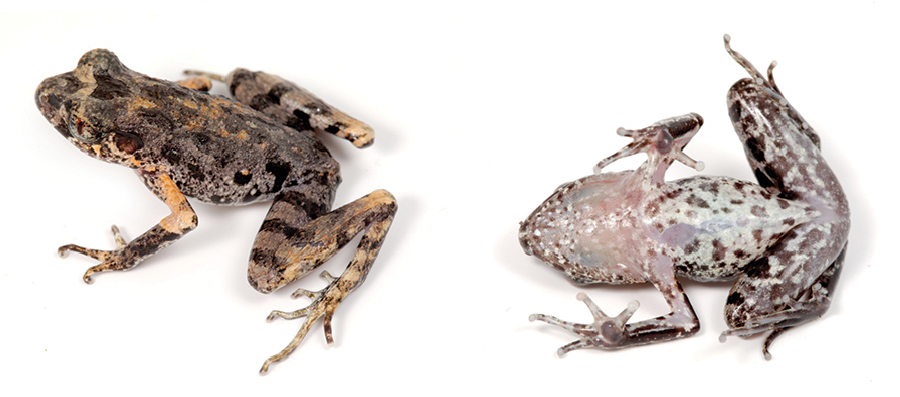

Conservation status
- Data Deficient (IUCN 3.1)

Scientific classification
- Kingdom: Animalia
- Phylum: Chordata
- Class: Amphibia
- Order: Anura
- Family: Megophryidae
- Genus: Leptobrachella
- Species: L. fritinniens

Binomial name
- Leptobrachella fritinniens (Dehling and Matsui, 2013)

Synonyms
- Leptolalax fritinniens Dehling and Matsui, 2013

= Leptobrachella fritinniens =

Species of frog

Leptobrachella fritinniens, commonly called the twittering litter frog, is a species of frog in the family Megophryidae. The species occurs in Brunei and Malaysia.
