= Leptobrachella tadungensis =

Conservation status
- Endangered (IUCN 3.1)

Scientific classification
- Kingdom: Animalia
- Phylum: Chordata
- Class: Amphibia
- Order: Anura
- Family: Megophryidae
- Genus: Leptobrachella
- Species: L. tadungensis

Binomial name
- Leptobrachella tadungensis (Rowley, Tran, Le, Dau, Peloso, Nguyen, Hoang, Nguyen, and Ziegler, 2016)

Synonyms
- Leptolalax tadungensis Rowley et al. 2016

Species of amphibian

Leptobrachella tadungensis, commonly called the Ta Dung litter toad, is a species of frog in the family Megophryidae. It is endemic to Vietnam, occurring only in the Ta Dung Nature Reserve of Dak Nong.
