= Leptobrachella pallida =

Conservation status
- Endangered (IUCN 3.1)

Scientific classification
- Kingdom: Animalia
- Phylum: Chordata
- Class: Amphibia
- Order: Anura
- Family: Megophryidae
- Genus: Leptobrachella
- Species: L. pallida

Binomial name
- Leptobrachella pallida (Rowley, Tran, Le, Dau, Peloso, Nguyen, Hoang, Nguyen, and Ziegler, 2016)

Synonyms
- Leptolalax pallidus Rowley et al., 2016

Species of amphibian

Leptobrachella pallida, commonly called the pale litter toad is a species of frog in the family Megophryidae. It is endemic to Vietnam, occurring only in Bidoup Nui Ba National Park.
