= Leptobrachella marmorata =

Conservation status
- Endangered (IUCN 3.1)

Scientific classification
- Kingdom: Animalia
- Phylum: Chordata
- Class: Amphibia
- Order: Anura
- Family: Megophryidae
- Genus: Leptobrachella
- Species: L. marmorata

Binomial name
- Leptobrachella marmorata (Matsui, Zainudin, and Nishikawa, 2014)

Synonyms
- Leptolalax marmoratus Matsui, Zainudin, and Nishikawa, 2014

Species of amphibian

Leptobrachella marmorata is a species of frog in the family Megophryidae. It occurs near the border of Indonesia and Malaysia on Borneo.
