= Leptobrachella fusca =

Scientific classification
- Kingdom: Animalia
- Phylum: Chordata
- Class: Amphibia
- Order: Anura
- Family: Megophryidae
- Genus: Leptobrachella
- Species: L. fusca

Binomial name
- Leptobrachella fusca Eto, Matsui, Hamidy, Munir, and Iskandar, 2018

Species of toad native to Indonesia

Leptobrachella fusca is a species of toad native to Indonesia in Borneo. A male specimen measured around 16.3 mm (0.64 in) long. It's deep-brown in color with basic toe webbings.
