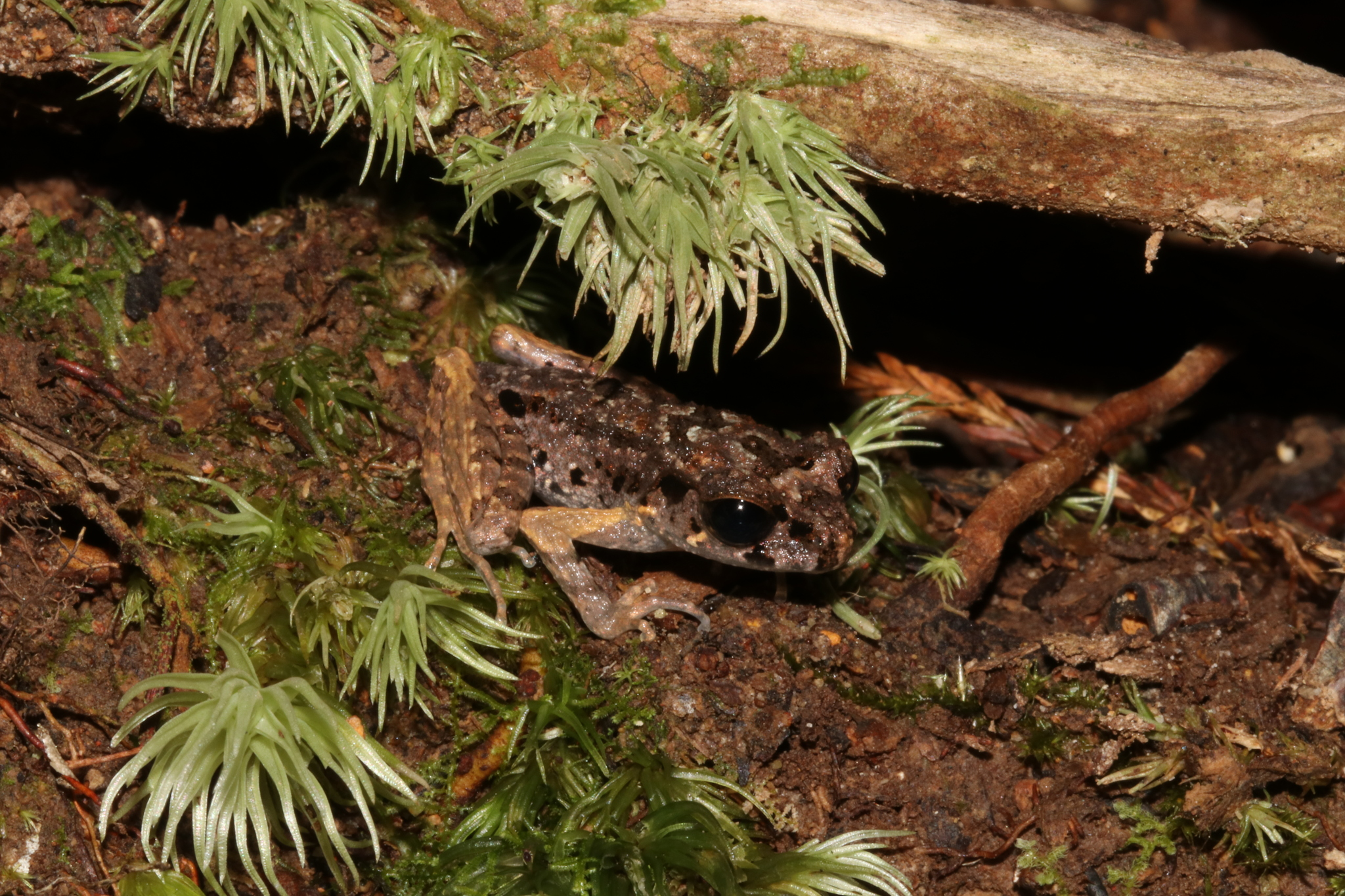

Conservation status
- Endangered (IUCN 3.1)

Scientific classification
- Kingdom: Animalia
- Phylum: Chordata
- Class: Amphibia
- Order: Anura
- Family: Megophryidae
- Genus: Leptobrachella
- Species: L. sabahmontana

Binomial name
- Leptobrachella sabahmontana (Matsui, Nishikawa, and Yambun, 2014)

Synonyms
- Leptolalax sabahmontanus Matsui, Nishikawa, and Imbun, 2014

= Leptobrachella sabahmontana =

Species of amphibian

Leptobrachella sabahmontana is a species of frog in the family Megophryidae. The species is endemic to Malaysia, specifically the Sabah region of Borneo.
