= Leptobrachella bidoupensis =

Conservation status
- Critically Endangered (IUCN 3.1)

Scientific classification
- Kingdom: Animalia
- Phylum: Chordata
- Class: Amphibia
- Order: Anura
- Family: Megophryidae
- Genus: Leptobrachella
- Species: L. bidoupensis

Binomial name
- Leptobrachella bidoupensis (Rowley, Le, Tran, and Hoang, 2011)

Synonyms
- Leptolalax bidoupensis Rowley, Le, Tran, and Hoang, 2011

Species of frog

Leptobrachella bidoupensis, commonly called the Bidoup litter toad, is a species of frog in the family Megophryidae endemic to Vietnam. It is only found within the confines of Bidoup Nui Ba National Park in Lâm Đồng.
