= Leptobrachella firthi =

Conservation status
- Endangered (IUCN 3.1)

Scientific classification
- Kingdom: Animalia
- Phylum: Chordata
- Class: Amphibia
- Order: Anura
- Family: Megophryidae
- Genus: Leptobrachella
- Species: L. firthi

Binomial name
- Leptobrachella firthi (Rowley, Hoang, Dau, Le, and Cao, 2012)

Synonyms
- Leptolalax firthi Rowley et al., 2012

Species of frog

Leptobrachella firthi is a species of frog in the family Megophryidae from Vietnam.
