= Leptobrachella maoershanensis =

Conservation status
- Near Threatened (IUCN 3.1)

Scientific classification
- Kingdom: Animalia
- Phylum: Chordata
- Class: Amphibia
- Order: Anura
- Family: Megophryidae
- Genus: Leptobrachella
- Species: L. maoershanensis

Binomial name
- Leptobrachella maoershanensis (Yuan, Sun, Chen, Rowley, and Che, 2017)

Synonyms
- Leptolalax maoershanensis Yuan, Sun, Chen, Rowley, and Che, 2017

Species of frog

Leptobrachella maoershanensis is a species of frog in the family Megophryidae. Its type locality is Maoershan Nature Reserve (广西猫儿山国家级自然保护区) in Guilin, Guangxi, China.
