= Leptobrachella ardens =

Conservation status
- Endangered (IUCN 3.1)

Scientific classification
- Kingdom: Animalia
- Phylum: Chordata
- Class: Amphibia
- Order: Anura
- Family: Megophryidae
- Genus: Leptobrachella
- Species: L. ardens

Binomial name
- Leptobrachella ardens (Rowley, Tran, Le, Dau, Peloso, Nguyen, Hoang, Nguyen, and Ziegler, 2016)

Synonyms
- Leptolalax ardens Rowley et al., 2016

Species of frog

Leptobrachella ardens, commonly called the Kon Ka Kinh litter toad, is a species of frog in the family Megophryidae. The species is endemic to Vietnam, occurring only in Kon Ka Kinh National Park of Gia Lai.
