= Leptobrachella crocea =

Conservation status
- Data Deficient (IUCN 3.1)

Scientific classification
- Kingdom: Animalia
- Phylum: Chordata
- Class: Amphibia
- Order: Anura
- Family: Megophryidae
- Genus: Leptobrachella
- Species: L. crocea

Binomial name
- Leptobrachella crocea (Rowley, Hoang, Le, Dau, and Cao, 2010)

Synonyms
- Leptolalax croceus Rowley, Hoang, Le, Dau, and Cao, 2010

Species of amphibian

Leptobrachella crocea (orange-bellied leaf-litter toad) is a species of toad in the family Megophryidae. Discovered in the Central Vietnam in 2010, it is endemic to the region as it is only known from its type locality, Ngoc Linh Nature Reserve in Đắk Glei District, Kon Tum Province. However, given the vicinity of the border to Laos it is also likely to be found there. Its belly has light orange color, which is unique among Leptobrachella. It is a medium-sized species within its genus: snout-vent length of 16 males was in the range 22–27 mm (0.87–1.06 in). The species was found from evergreen forest at about 1,300 m (4,300 ft) elevation.
