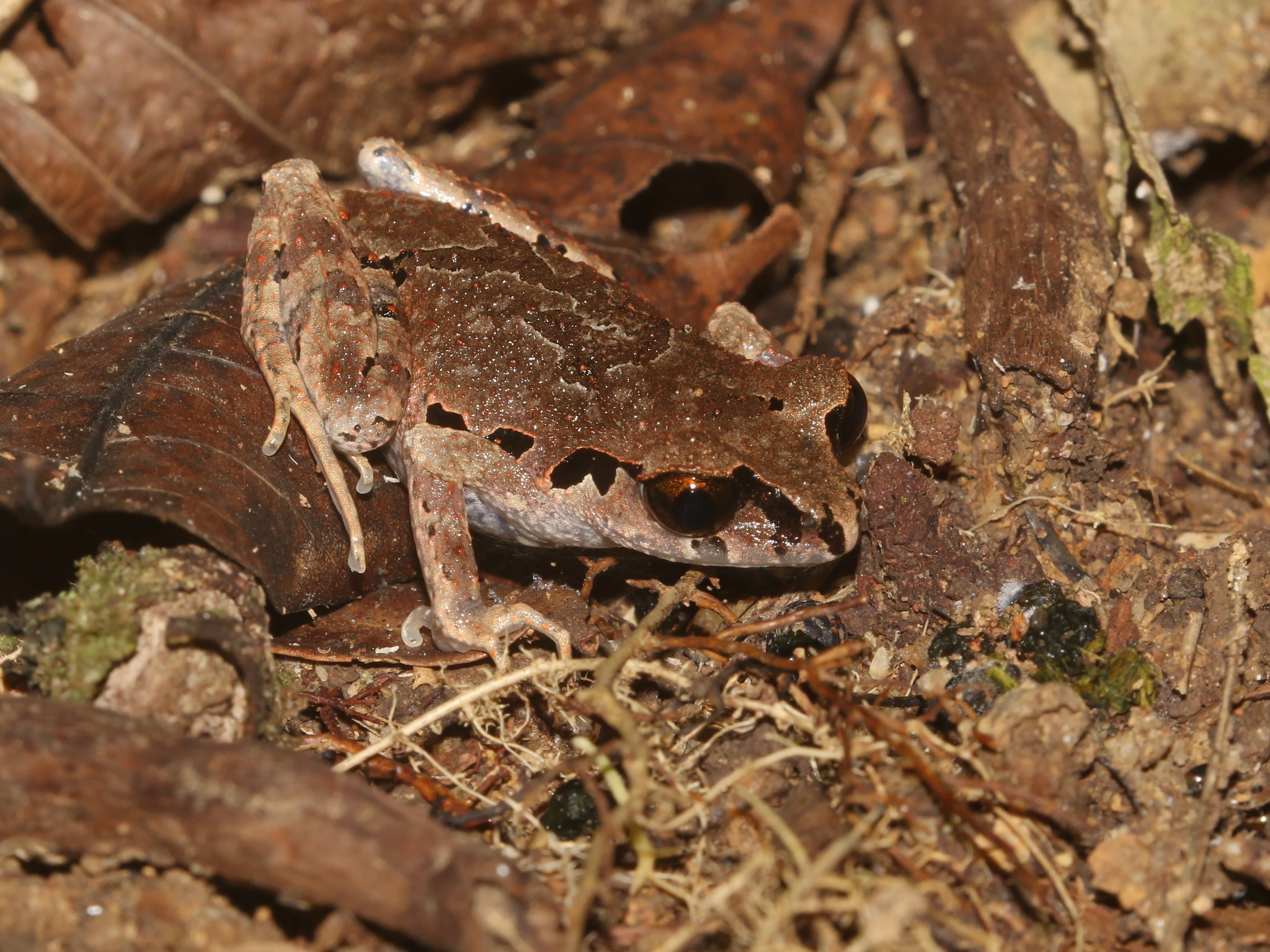

Conservation status
- Least Concern (IUCN 3.1)

Scientific classification
- Kingdom: Animalia
- Phylum: Chordata
- Class: Amphibia
- Order: Anura
- Family: Megophryidae
- Genus: Leptobrachella
- Species: L. sola

Binomial name
- Leptobrachella sola (Matsui, 2006)

Synonyms
- Leptolalax solus Matsui, 2006

= Leptobrachella sola =

Species of amphibian

Leptobrachella sola, commonly called the Hala Bala litter toad, is a frog species in the family Megophryidae. It lives in Thailand, where it was originally known from its type locality, Hala Bala Wildlife Sanctuary in Narathiwat Province near the Malaysian border; its range is now confirmed to also extend across much of Malaysia. The type collection consists of a single adult frog (the holotype), which measured 28 mm (1.1 in) in snout-vent length.
