= Leptobrachella maculosa =

Conservation status
- Endangered (IUCN 3.1)

Scientific classification
- Kingdom: Animalia
- Phylum: Chordata
- Class: Amphibia
- Order: Anura
- Family: Megophryidae
- Genus: Leptobrachella
- Species: L. maculosa

Binomial name
- Leptobrachella maculosa (Rowley, Tran, Le, Dau, Peloso, Nguyen, Hoang, Nguyen, and Ziegler, 2016)

Synonyms
- Leptolalax maculosus Rowley et al., 2016

Species of amphibian

Leptobrachella maculosa, commonly referred to as the spotted litter toad, is a species of frog in the family Megophryidae. It is endemic to Vietnam, where it has only been documented in Phuoc Binh National Park.
