= Leptobrachella itiokai =

Conservation status
- Near Threatened (IUCN 3.1)

Scientific classification
- Kingdom: Animalia
- Phylum: Chordata
- Class: Amphibia
- Order: Anura
- Family: Megophryidae
- Genus: Leptobrachella
- Species: L. itiokai

Binomial name
- Leptobrachella itiokai Eto, Matsui, and Nishikawa, 2016

Species of frog

Leptobrachella itiokai, commonly known as Itioka's dwarf litter frog, is a species of frog in the family Megophryidae. It is endemic to Malaysia, known only from its type locality in Gunung Mulu National Park in Sarawak.
