= Leptobrachella tuberosa =

Conservation status
- Least Concern (IUCN 3.1)

Scientific classification
- Kingdom: Animalia
- Phylum: Chordata
- Class: Amphibia
- Order: Anura
- Family: Megophryidae
- Genus: Leptobrachella
- Species: L. tuberosa

Binomial name
- Leptobrachella tuberosa (Inger, Orlov, and Darevsky, 1999)
- Distribution of Leptobrachella tuberosa

Synonyms
- Leptolalax tuberosus Inger, Orlov, and Darevsky, 1999

Species of frog

Leptobrachella tuberosa, also known as the granular toad, is a species of frog in the family Megophryidae. As currently known, it is endemic to the Central Highlands of Vietnam in Gia Lai, Quảng Nam, and Thừa Thiên–Huế Provinces. Its true range is probably wider as suitable habitat extends further north and east, reaching northeastern Cambodia and southeastern Laos. The specific name tuberosa is derived from the Latin tuberosus, meaning "full of protuberances".

== Description ==
Adult males measure 24–30 mm (0.9–1.2 in) and adult females, based on a single specimen, about 30 mm (1.2 in) in snout–vent length. The overall appearance is stocky. The snout is obtusely pointed, rounded or truncate in profile. The tympanum is obscured by skin. The finger and toe tips are blunt; the toes have basal webbing. Skin is dorsally covered by many small tubercles of various sizes. In preserved specimens, the dorsum is dark grey or black with obscure light speckling that becomes heavier low on the sides. The venter is white with thin black lines. The limbs have darker crossbars.

== Habitat and conservation ==
Leptobrachella tuberosa inhabits montane primary forests at elevations of 850–1,401 m (2,789–4,596 ft) above sea level. It is associated with rocky streams and herbaceous riparian vegetation. One male was observed calling from vegetation one metre above the ground by a cascading stream. This species presumably deposits its eggs in streams where the tadpoles will later develop.

Leptobrachella tuberosa has mostly been observed in undisturbed forest. Habitat loss and degradation is a general threat in the range of this species, and could also affect it. It is present in the Ngọc Linh and Song Thanh Nature Reserves in Vietnam. Its potential range in Laos overlaps with some other protected areas.
