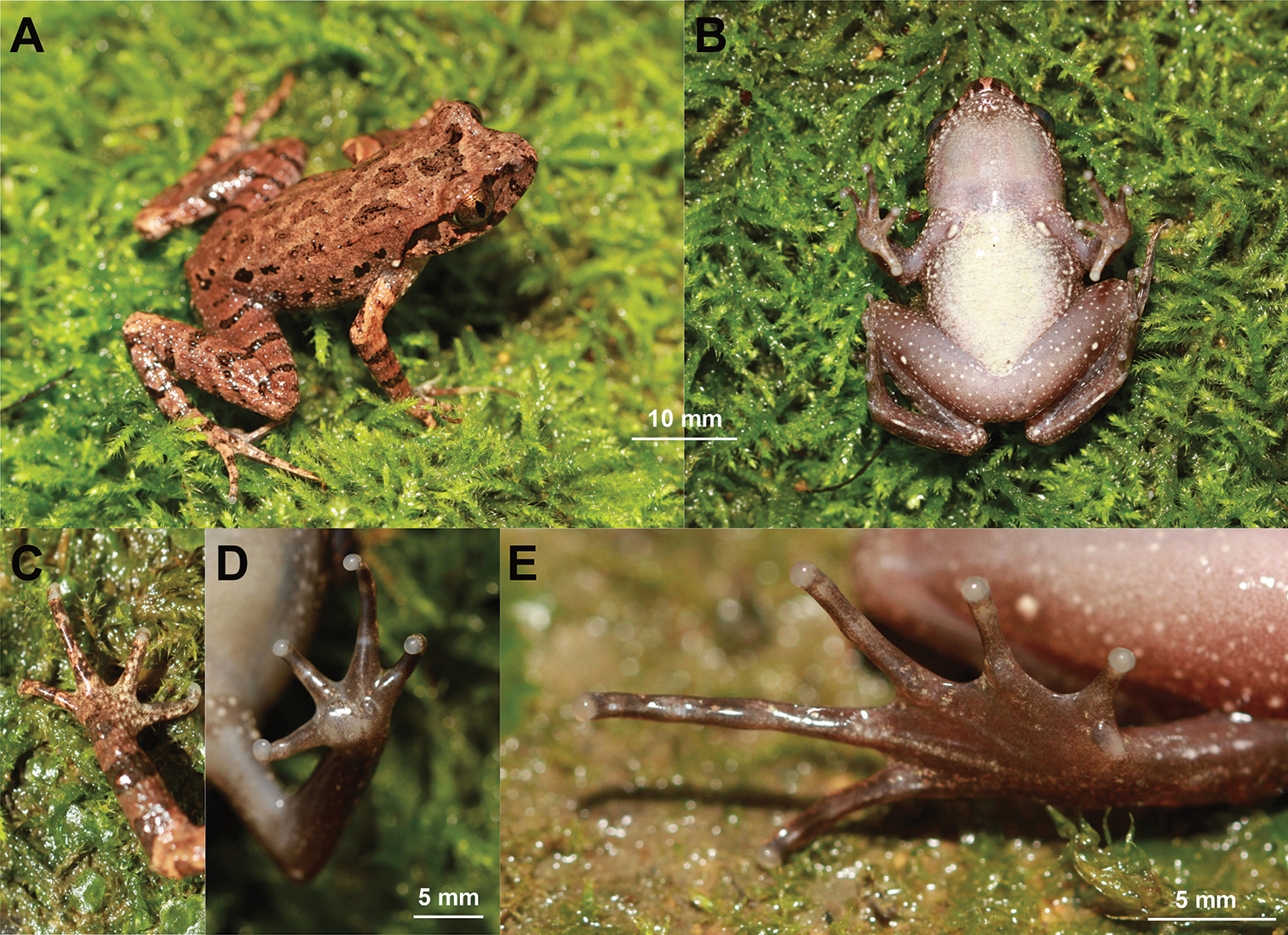

Scientific classification
- Domain: Eukaryota
- Kingdom: Animalia
- Phylum: Chordata
- Class: Amphibia
- Order: Anura
- Family: Megophryidae
- Genus: Leptobrachella
- Species: L. chishuiensis

Binomial name
- Leptobrachella chishuiensis Li, Liu, Wei & Wang, 2020

= Chishui leaf litter toad =

Species of toad originating in Eastern Asia

The Chishui leaf litter toad (Leptobrachella chishuiensis) is a species of frog endemic to Eastern Asia in China. The species was described in 2020.
