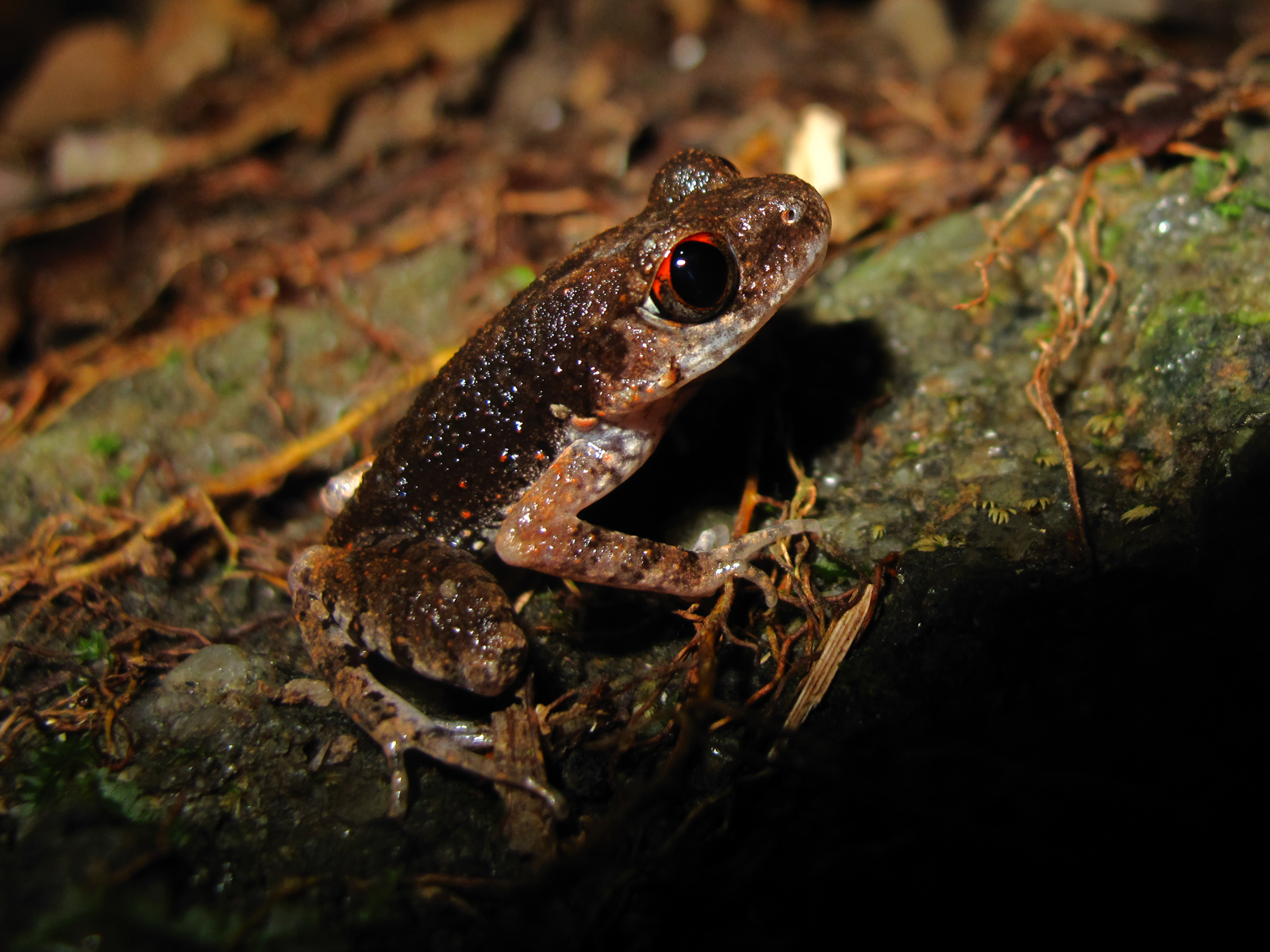

Conservation status
- Least Concern (IUCN 3.1)

Scientific classification
- Kingdom: Animalia
- Phylum: Chordata
- Class: Amphibia
- Order: Anura
- Family: Megophryidae
- Genus: Leptobrachella
- Species: L. melanoleuca

Binomial name
- Leptobrachella melanoleuca (Matsui, 2006)

Synonyms
- Leptolalax melanoleucus Matsui, 2006

= Leptobrachella melanoleuca =

Species of amphibian

Leptobrachella melanoleuca, commonly called the black-and-white litter toad, is a frog species in the family Megophryidae. It is endemic to Thailand, although it has a relatively wide distribution near the Burmese border from the Khlong Saeng Wildlife Sanctuary (the type locality) in the central peninsular Thailand northwards to the vicinity of Pilok in Thong Pha Phum District, southwestern mainland Thailand; it may also be found in Myanmar. The type collection consists of three males measuring 27–29 mm (1.1–1.1 in) in snout-vent length and a single female at 33 mm (1.3 in) SVL. Males can be found calling at night near small streams.
