= Fei's leaf litter toad =

Scientific classification
- Kingdom: Animalia
- Phylum: Chordata
- Class: Amphibia
- Order: Anura
- Family: Megophryidae
- Genus: Leptobrachella
- Species: L. feii

Binomial name
- Leptobrachella feii Chen, Yuan, and Che, 2020

Species of frog found in China

The Fei's leaf litter toad (Leptobrachella feii) is a species of frog in the Leptobrachella genus. It is currently considered to be endemic to China, found in two locations of the Yunnan Province. The species was first described in 2020.
