= Leptobrachella xishuiensis =

Scientific classification
- Domain: Eukaryota
- Kingdom: Animalia
- Phylum: Chordata
- Class: Amphibia
- Order: Anura
- Family: Megophryidae
- Genus: Leptobrachella
- Species: L. xishuiensis

Binomial name
- Leptobrachella xishuiensis Luo, Zhao, Wang, Lan, Xiao, Deng, Xiao, and Zhou, 2025

Species of toad

Leptobrachella xishuiensis, or the Xishui leaf-litter toad, is a species of toad native to southwestern regions of China. It is named after Xishui County, Guizhou, where it was first encountered by researchers.

== Description ==
Leptobrachella xishuiensis possesses rudimentary webbed toes that are absent of lateral fringes. Its ventral surface is greyish-white in color while its limbs, chest, and throat are purplish-grey. It is found in bamboo forests at elevations of 1600 meters.
