= Leptobrachella nyx =

Conservation status
- Data Deficient (IUCN 3.1)

Scientific classification
- Kingdom: Animalia
- Phylum: Chordata
- Class: Amphibia
- Order: Anura
- Family: Megophryidae
- Genus: Leptobrachella
- Species: L. nyx

Binomial name
- Leptobrachella nyx (Ohler, Wollenberg, Grosjean, Hendrix, Vences, Ziegler, and Dubois, 2011)

Synonyms
- Leptolalax (Lalos) nyx Ohler et al. 2011

Species of frog

Leptobrachella nyx, commonly called the midnight litter toad, is a species of frog in the family Megophryidae. It occurs in Ha Giang and Bac Giang in Vietnam, and the Yunnan province of China.
