= Leptobrachella natunae =

Conservation status
- Data Deficient (IUCN 3.1)

Scientific classification
- Kingdom: Animalia
- Phylum: Chordata
- Class: Amphibia
- Order: Anura
- Family: Megophryidae
- Genus: Leptobrachella
- Species: L. natunae

Binomial name
- Leptobrachella natunae (Günther, 1895)

Synonyms
- Leptobrachium natunae Günther, 1895

Species of amphibian

Leptobrachella natunae (sometimes known as the Natuna Borneo frog or Natuna Island frog) is a species of amphibian in the family Megophryidae. It is endemic to Natuna Besar in the Natuna Islands (Indonesia) of South China Sea. It has not been recorded after its description, more than a century ago. Its natural habitats are tropical moist lowland forests and rivers.
