= Leptobrachella lateralis =

Conservation status
- Critically Endangered (IUCN 3.1)

Scientific classification
- Kingdom: Animalia
- Phylum: Chordata
- Class: Amphibia
- Order: Anura
- Family: Megophryidae
- Genus: Leptobrachella
- Species: L. lateralis

Binomial name
- Leptobrachella lateralis (Anderson, 1871)

Synonyms
- Ixalus lateralis Anderson, 1871; Megophrys lateralis — Liu, 1950; Megophrys (Megophrys) lateralis — Dubois, 1980; Panophrys lateralis — Rao & Yang, 1997; Megophrys (Xenophrys) lateralis — Dubois & Ohler, 1998; Xenophrys lateralis — Khonsue & Thirakhupt, 2001; Leptolalax (Lalax) lateralis — Delorme, Dubois, Grosjean, & Ohler, 2006

Species of frog

Leptobrachella lateralis is a species of frog in the family Megophryidae. It was first described by John Anderson (1871), who originally named it Ixalus lateralis. The holotype is lost and its exact origins are uncertain, but it was likely collected "from some portion of the surrounding region [of Bhamò]", Myanmar. It is only known with confidence from the region of its type locality and from Nagaland in Northeast India. Its range might extend into Yunnan, China. It is sometimes called Nagaland Asian toad or Nagaland leaf litter toad.

== Description ==
Adult males measure 27–28 mm (1.1–1.1 in) and adult females about 37 mm (1.5 in) in snout–vent length. The dorsum has one triangular or some irregular dark spots. The venter is pale yellowish marbled with brown. The flanks have few small dark spots. There is a whitish lateroventral glandular ridge, which is alluded to in the specific name lateralis. The toes have rudimentary webbing only.
