= Leptobrachella applebyi =

Conservation status
- Endangered (IUCN 3.1)

Scientific classification
- Kingdom: Animalia
- Phylum: Chordata
- Class: Amphibia
- Order: Anura
- Family: Megophryidae
- Genus: Leptobrachella
- Species: L. applebyi

Binomial name
- Leptobrachella applebyi (Rowley and Cao, 2009)

Synonyms
- Leptolalax applebyi Rowley and Cao, 2009

Species of amphibian

Leptobrachella applebyi, commonly called Appleby's leaf-litter toad, is a species of frog in the family Megophryidae. It is endemic to Vietnam where it is only known from near its type locality, Song Thanh Nature Reserve, Phước Sơn District in Quảng Nam Province of central Vietnam.

Leptobrachella applebyi is a montane species found near streams. It is a small species even among generally small Leptobrachella: five adult males were recorded to measure 20–21 mm (0.79–0.83 in) in snout-vent length and a single female 22 mm (0.87 in) SVL.
