= Leptobrachella bashaensis =

Scientific classification
- Kingdom: Animalia
- Phylum: Chordata
- Class: Amphibia
- Order: Anura
- Family: Megophryidae
- Genus: Leptobrachella
- Species: L. bashaensis

Binomial name
- Leptobrachella bashaensis Lyu, Dai, Wei, He, Yuan, Shi, Zhou, Ran, Kuang, Guo, Wei & Yuan, 2020

Species of frog

Leptobrachella bashaensis is a species of frog endemic to southern Asia. The species was scientifically described in 2020. More specifically, it was discovered in Guizhou, China. The species measure around 22.9 to 27.1 mm (0.90 to 1.07 in), with females being larger than males. It has spots under the body.
