= Leptobrachella flaviglandulosa =

Scientific classification
- Kingdom: Animalia
- Phylum: Chordata
- Class: Amphibia
- Order: Anura
- Family: Megophryidae
- Genus: Leptobrachella
- Species: L. flaviglandulosa

Binomial name
- Leptobrachella flaviglandulosa Chen, Wang, and Che, 2020

Species of toad

Leptobrachella flaviglandulosa, the yellow-gland leaf litter toad, is a toad species of the Leptobrachella genus. Its native range is in China and its scientific description took place in 2020.
