= Leptobrachella khasiorum =

Conservation status
- Critically Endangered (IUCN 3.1)

Scientific classification
- Kingdom: Animalia
- Phylum: Chordata
- Class: Amphibia
- Order: Anura
- Family: Megophryidae
- Genus: Leptobrachella
- Species: L. khasiorum

Binomial name
- Leptobrachella khasiorum (Das, Tron, Rangad, and Hooroo, 2010)

Synonyms
- Leptolalax khasiorum Das, Tron, Rangad, and Hooroo, 2010

Species of amphibian

Leptobrachella khasiorum, commonly called the Khasi slender-armed frog, is a species of frog belonging to the genus Leptobrachella. It is so far reported only from the type locality, from the subtropical wet forests of Mawphlang in Khasi Hills, Meghalaya, India. It is a small amphibian; the male measuring 25.6 mm, and female 32.5 mm. The species is diagnosed with unique features such as eyelids with tubercles, distinct tympanum and supratympanic folds, undilated toe tips with dermal fringes, dorsum with dark blotches, flanks with large dark blotches, dark tympanic mask, limbs with dark cross-bars, and distinct color patches.
