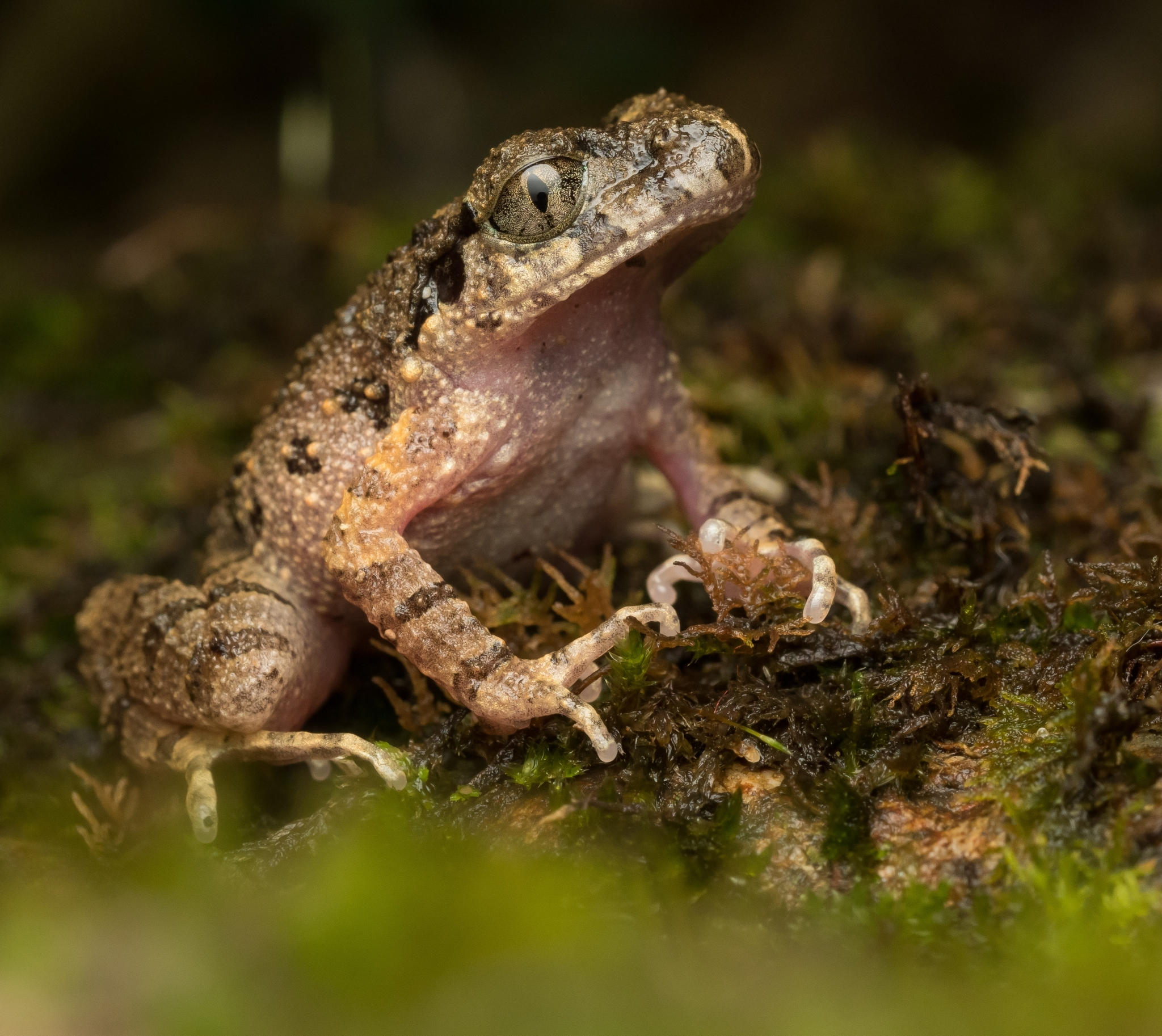

Conservation status
- Vulnerable (IUCN 3.1)

Scientific classification
- Kingdom: Animalia
- Phylum: Chordata
- Class: Amphibia
- Order: Anura
- Family: Megophryidae
- Genus: Leptobrachella
- Species: L. laui

Binomial name
- Leptobrachella laui (Sung, Yang, and Wang, 2014)

Synonyms
- Leptolalax (Lalos) laui Sung, Yang, and Wang, 2014

= Leptobrachella laui =

Species of amphibian

Leptobrachella laui, commonly called Lau's little leaf toad is a species of frog in the family Megophryidae.

== Range ==
It has been recorded from Tai Mo Shan, Tai Po Kau, Shing Mun, Ho Chung, Kadoorie Farm and Botanic Garden, Sunset Peak, and Lantau Peak, in Hong Kong, as well as Wutongshan National Forest Park, Shenzhen City, Guangdong Province, China.
