= Leptobrachella zhangyapingi =

Scientific classification
- Kingdom: Animalia
- Phylum: Chordata
- Class: Amphibia
- Order: Anura
- Family: Megophryidae
- Genus: Leptobrachella
- Species: L. zhangyapingi

Binomial name
- Leptobrachella zhangyapingi (Jiang, Yan, Suwannapoom, Chomdej, and Che, 2013)

Synonyms
- Leptolalax zhangyapingi Jiang, Yan, Suwannapoom, Chomdej, and Che, 2013

Species of frog

Leptobrachella zhangyapingi, commonly called Ya-Ping's litter toad, is a species of frog in the family Megophryidae from northern Thailand. Its type locality is Phang Num Poo, in Thep Sadet subdistrict, Doi Saket district, Chiang Mai Province, Thailand.
