= Leptobrachella rowleyae =

Conservation status
- Critically Endangered (IUCN 3.1)

Scientific classification
- Kingdom: Animalia
- Phylum: Chordata
- Class: Amphibia
- Order: Anura
- Family: Megophryidae
- Genus: Leptobrachella
- Species: L. rowleyae

Binomial name
- Leptobrachella rowleyae (Nguyen, Poyarkov, Le, Vo, Ninh, Duong, Murphy, and Sang, 2018)

Synonyms
- Leptolalax rowleyae Nguyen et al., 2018

Species of amphibian

Leptobrachella rowleyae, commonly called Rowley's litter toad, is a species of frog in the family Megophryidae. It is endemic to the Son Tra Peninsula in Da Nang, Vietnam.
