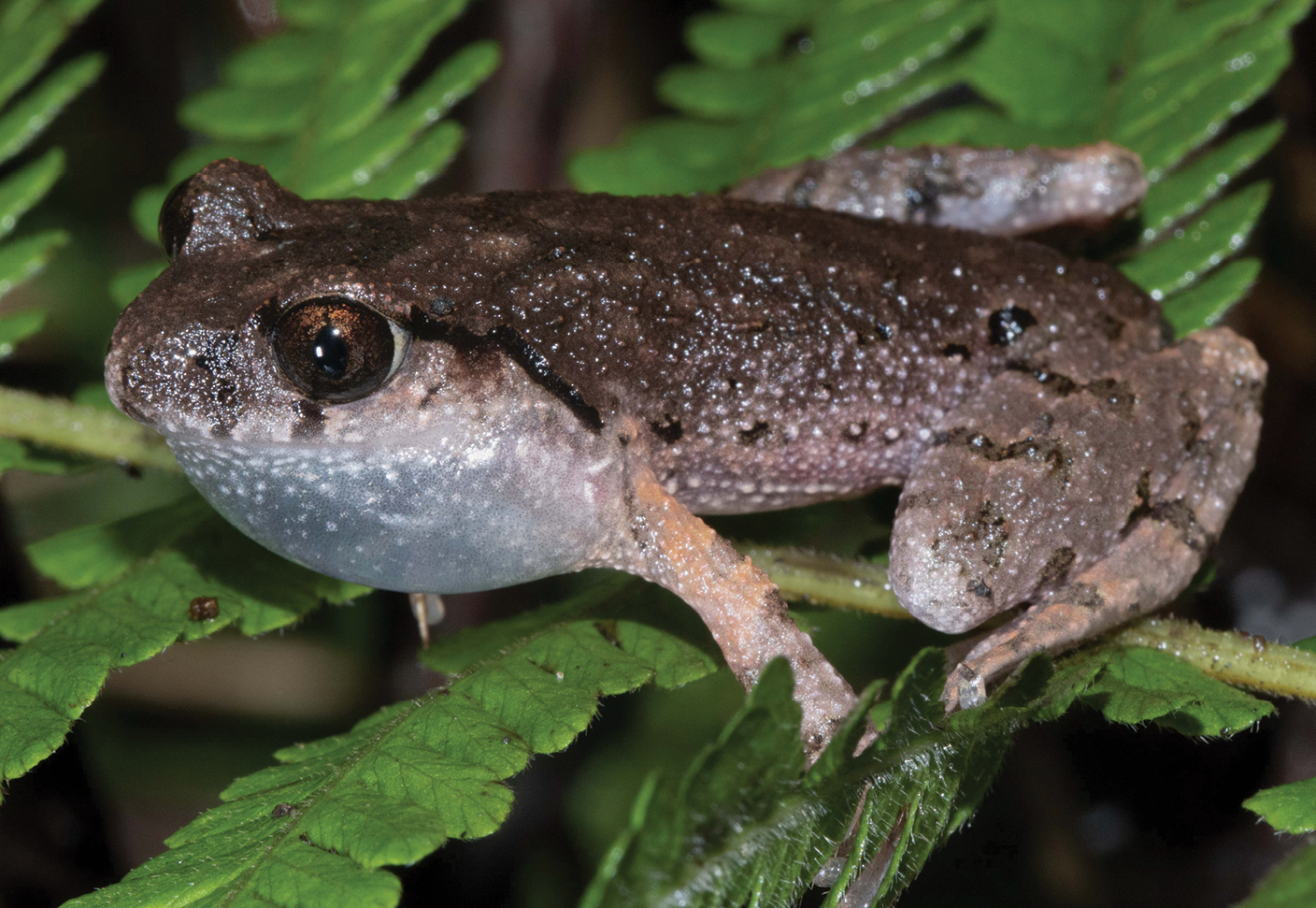

Conservation status
- Data Deficient (IUCN 3.1)

Scientific classification
- Kingdom: Animalia
- Phylum: Chordata
- Class: Amphibia
- Order: Anura
- Family: Megophryidae
- Genus: Leptobrachella
- Species: L. bijie

Binomial name
- Leptobrachella bijie Wang, Li, Li, Chen & Wang, 2019

= Bijie leaf litter toad =

Species of toad native to China

The Bijie leaf litter toad (Leptobrachella bijie) is a species of frog from the genus Leptobrachella. It's endemic to China and was scientifically described in 2019. It occurs in an elevation range of 1,670 to 1,750 m (5,480 to 5,740 ft) in wetlands and forests.

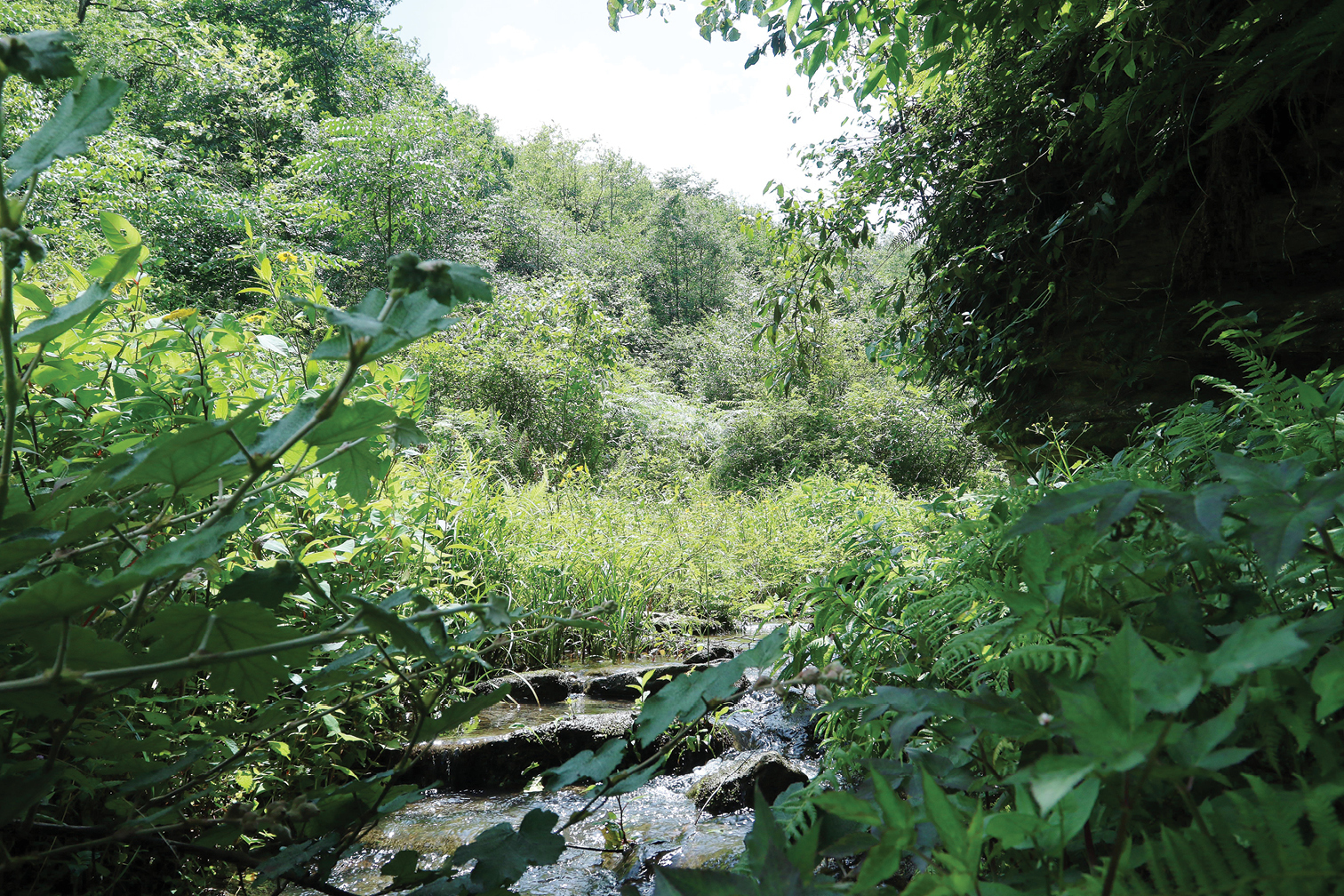
Habitat of Leptobrachella bijie
