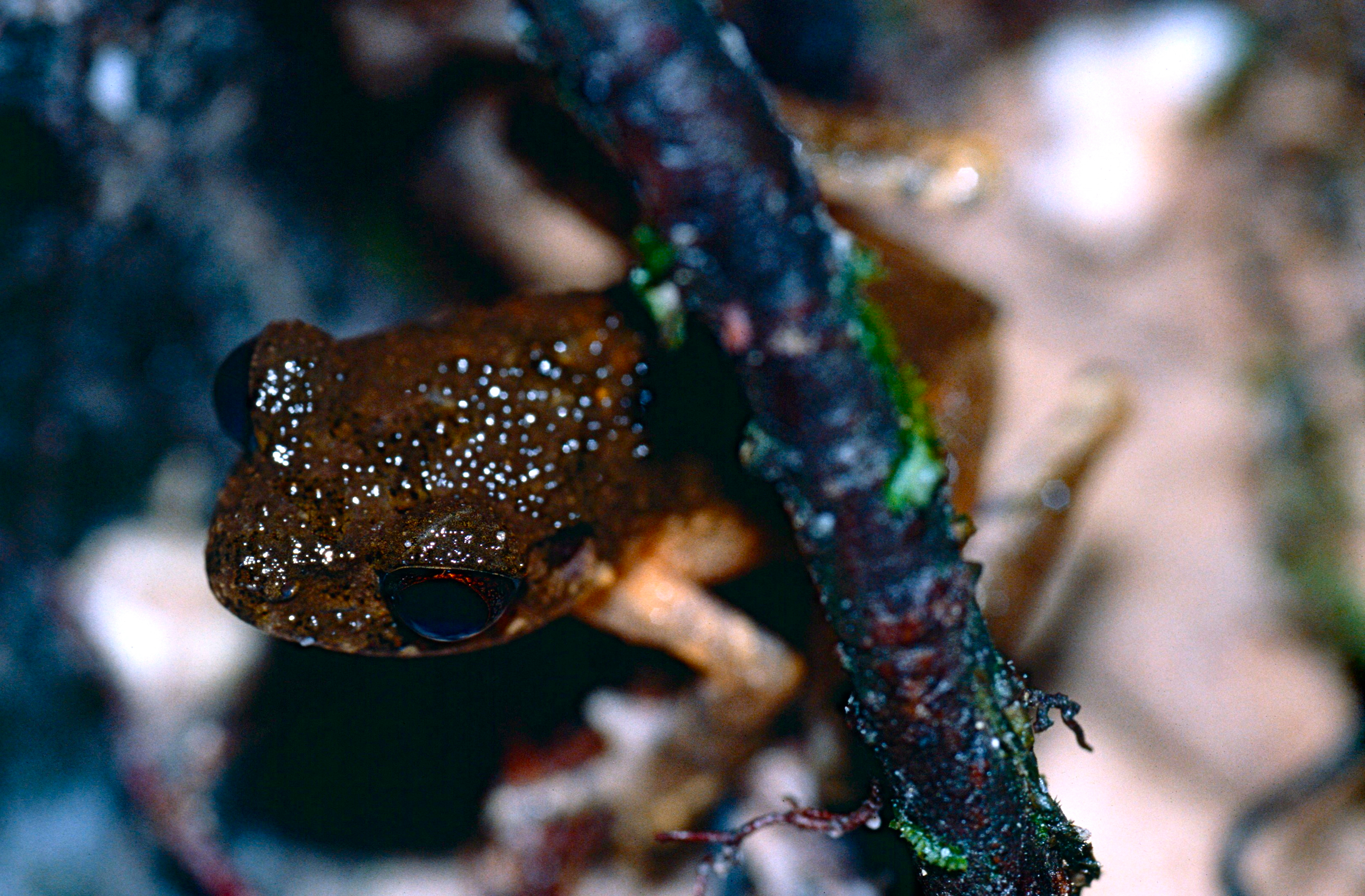

Conservation status
- Least Concern (IUCN 3.1)

Scientific classification
- Kingdom: Animalia
- Phylum: Chordata
- Class: Amphibia
- Order: Anura
- Family: Megophryidae
- Genus: Leptobrachella
- Species: L. gracilis

Binomial name
- Leptobrachella gracilis (Günther, 1872)

Synonyms
- Leptobrachium gracile Günther, 1872; Megalophrys gracilis Boulenger, 1908; Megophrys gracilis Smith, 1930; Leptobrachium gracilis Berry and Hendrickson, 1963; Leptolalax gracilis Dubois, 1980

= Leptobrachella gracilis =

Species of amphibian

Leptobrachella gracilis, commonly called the slender litter frog, is a frog species in the family Megophryidae. It is endemic to northern Borneo: Brunei, Kalimantan (Indonesia), and Sarawak (Malaysia). Earlier records from the Malay Peninsula and Thailand refer to other species (at least Leptobrachella platycephala, an unnamed species, and possibly Leptobrachella melanoleuca). Its natural habitats are tropical moist lowland forests, moist montane forests, and rivers. It is becoming rare due to habitat loss.
