= Leptobrachella hamidi =

Conservation status
- Least Concern (IUCN 3.1)

Scientific classification
- Kingdom: Animalia
- Phylum: Chordata
- Class: Amphibia
- Order: Anura
- Family: Megophryidae
- Genus: Leptobrachella
- Species: L. hamidi

Binomial name
- Leptobrachella hamidi (Matsui, 1997)

Synonyms
- Leptolalax hamidi Matsui, 1997

Species of amphibian

Leptobrachella hamidi, commonly called the white-bellied slender litter frog, is a frog species in the family Megophryidae. It is endemic to Borneo, where it can be found both in western Sarawak, Malaysia, and Kalimantan, Indonesia. Its natural habitats are tropical moist lowland hilly rainforests and rocky streams. It is threatened by habitat loss from clear-cutting for oil palm plantations.

== Description ==
Among Leptobrachella, this species is among the larger members: males measure 28–31 mm (1.1–1.2 in) in snout-vent length and females 36–43 mm (1.4–1.7 in) in SVL. It has a slender head and body. Its back, including on top of snout, is clearly marked with discrete blotches; chest and abdomen are without large dark markings.
