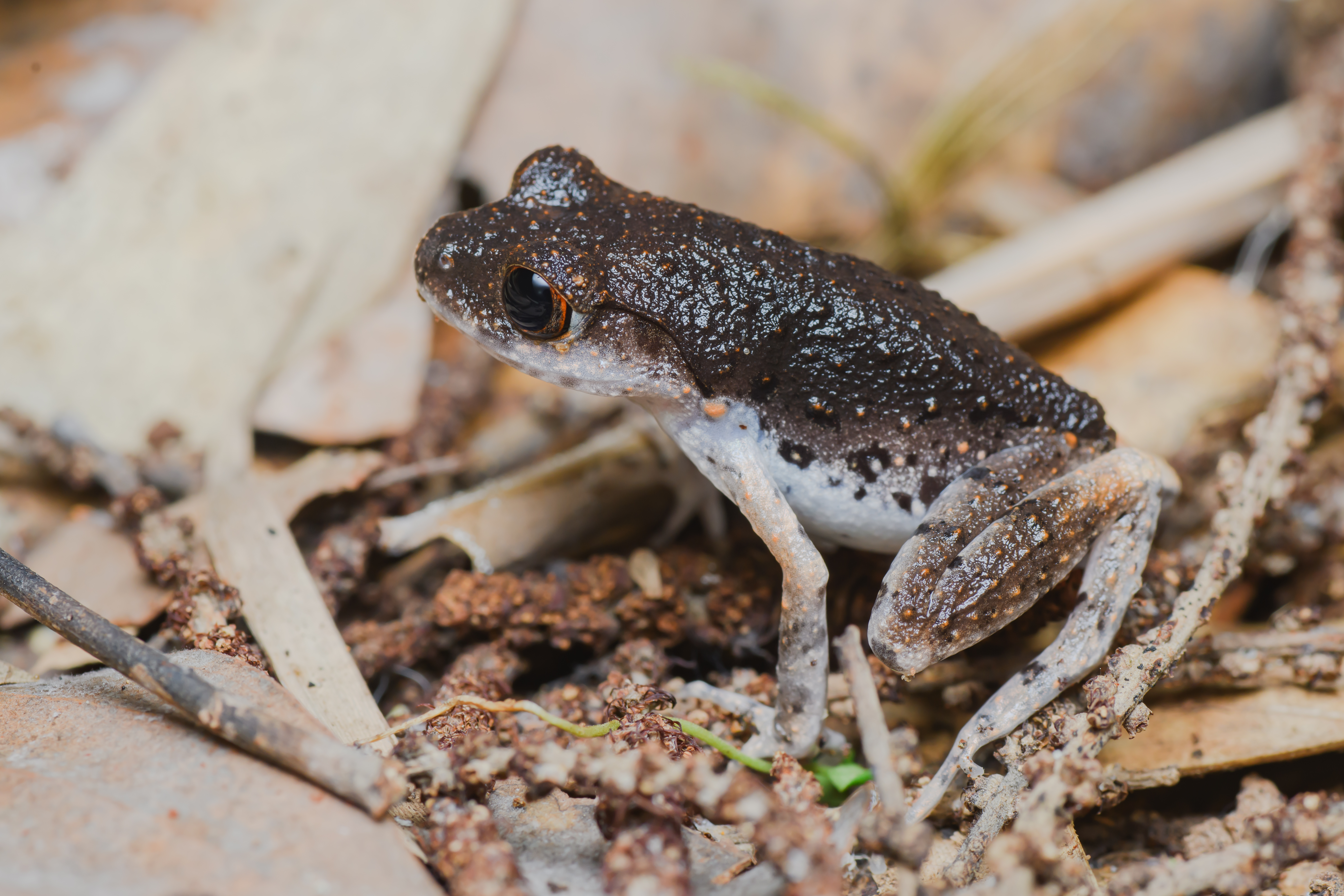
- Leptobrachella fuliginosa

Scientific classification
- Kingdom: Animalia
- Phylum: Chordata
- Class: Amphibia
- Order: Anura
- Family: Megophryidae
- Genus: Leptobrachella; Smith, 1925

Type species
- Leptobrachella mjöbergi Smith, 1925

Synonyms
- Nesobia Kampen, 1923; Paramegophrys Liu, 1964; Carpophrys Sichuan Biological Research Institute, 1977; Leptolalax Dubois, 1983; Lalax Delorme, Dubois, Grosjean, & Ohler, 2006; Lalos Dubois, Grosjean, Ohler, Adler, & Zhao, 2010

= Leptobrachella =

Genus of amphibians

Leptobrachella is a genus of frogs in the family Megophryidae. Members of Leptobrachella are found throughout Asia including on Borneo and the Natuna Islands. They are sometimes referred to as Borneo frogs, slender-armed frogs, or dwarf litter frogs. The genus contains over 120 currently described species.

== Description ==
Leptobrachella are small frogs that are not easily seen as they are well camouflaged on the ground. However, their advertisement call is loud, and they can be abundant along streams.

The tadpoles of Leptobrachella are unusual in their vermiform or eel-like appearance. The transition from the narrow, cylindrical trunk into the strong tail is nearly seamless, and the tail fin is very low. This body shape is interpreted as an adaptation to a fossorial life style: Leptobrachella tadpoles live in the gravel beds of small streams. In Leptobrachella mjobergi where more detailed observations have been made, tadpoles have unusually mobile head and trunk, partly because the notochord is not connected to the skull. While smaller tadpoles seem to use existing interstitial spaces, larger ones can actively push their way through gravel. The hyobranchial apparatus, a skeletal complex in the throat which supports the mouth, gills, and feeding muscles, is highly reduced.

== Taxonomy ==
Following phylogenetic analysis of Leptobrachella and its (at the time) sister taxon Leptolalax, the latter was determined to be paraphyletic. Following these findings, all Leptolalax species were subsumed into Leptobrachella.

== Diet and reproduction ==
Leptobrachella are carnivorous amphibians, consuming about any insect, such as mosquitoes, spiders, grasshoppers, and butterflies. They lay their eggs in the water, such as ponds. Their tadpoles have tails and internal gills

== Distribution ==
Leptobrachella are usually found in the forests of Southeast Asia; however they can be found in southwestern Cambodia and adjacent to Thailand.

== Species ==
The following 121 species are recognised in the genus Leptobrachella:

- Leptobrachella aerea (Rowley, Stuart, Richards, Phimmachak, and Sivongxay, 2010)
- Leptobrachella albomarginata Wu, Yu, Kilunda, Murphy, and Che, 2025
- Leptobrachella alpina (Fei, Ye, and Li, 1990)
- Leptobrachella applebyi (Rowley and Cao, 2009)
- Leptobrachella arayai (Matsui, 1997)
- Leptobrachella ardens (Rowley et al., 2016)
- Leptobrachella aspera Wang, Lyu, Qi, and Wang, 2020
- Leptobrachella aurantirosea Ninh, Nguyen, Le, Nguyen, Quoc, Orlov, Bezman-Moseyko, Le, Nguyen, and Ziegler, 2024
- Leptobrachella baluensis Smith, 1931
- Leptobrachella bashaensis Lyu, Dai, Wei, He, Yuan, Shi, Zhou, Ran, Kuang, Guo, Wei, and Yuan, 2020
- Leptobrachella batxatensis Hoang, Pham, Phan, Do, Wang, Jiang, and Nguyen, 2025
- Leptobrachella bidoupensis (Rowley, Le, Tran, and Hoang, 2011)
- Leptobrachella bijie Wang, Li, Li, Chen, and Wang, 2019
- Leptobrachella bondangensis Eto, Matsui, Hamidy, Munir, and Iskandar, 2018
- Leptobrachella botsfordi (Rowley, Dau, and Nguyen, 2013)
- Leptobrachella bourreti (Dubois, 1983)
- Leptobrachella brevicrus Dring, 1983
- Leptobrachella cathaya Huang, Zeng, Wang, Lyu, Huang, Liu, Wang, and Mo, 2026
- Leptobrachella chishuiensis Li, Liu, Wei, and Wang, 2020
- Leptobrachella crocea (Rowley, Hoang, Le, Dau, and Cao, 2010)
- Leptobrachella damingshanensis Chen, Yu, Cheng, Meng, Wei, Zhou, and Lu, 2021
- Leptobrachella darongshanensis Chen, Bei, and Li, 2025
- Leptobrachella dayaoshanensis Chen, Yu, Meng, and Qin, 2024
- Leptobrachella deocaensis Do, Nguyen, Hoang, Ziegler, and Pham, 2026
- Leptobrachella dong Liu, Shi, Li, Zhang, Xiang, Wei, and Wang, 2023
- Leptobrachella dorsospina Wang, Lyu, Qi, and Wang, 2020
- Leptobrachella dringi (Dubois, 1987)
- Leptobrachella dushanensis Li, Li, Cheng, Liu, Wei, Wang, 2024
- Leptobrachella duyenae Hoang, Pham, Phan, Do, Wang, Jiang, and Nguyen, 2025
- Leptobrachella eos (Ohler et al., 2011)
- Leptobrachella feii Chen, Yuan, and Che, 2020
- Leptobrachella firthi (Rowley, Hoang, Dau, Le, and Cao, 2012)
- Leptobrachella flaviglandulosa Chen, Wang, and Che, 2020
- Leptobrachella fritinniens (Dehling and Matsui, 2013)
- Leptobrachella fuliginosa (Matsui, 2006)
- Leptobrachella fusca Eto, Matsui, Hamidy, Munir, and Iskandar, 2018
- Leptobrachella gracilis (Günther, 1872)
- Leptobrachella graminicola Nguyen, Tapley, Nguyen, Luong, and Rowley, 2021
- Leptobrachella guinanensis Chen, Li, Peng, and Liu, 2024
- Leptobrachella hamidi (Matsui, 1997)
- Leptobrachella heteropus (Boulenger, 1900)
- Leptobrachella huynhi Hoang, Luong, Nguyen, Nguyen, Ninh, Le, Ziegler, and Pham, 2024
- Leptobrachella isos (Rowley, Stuart, Neang, Hoang, Dau, Nguyen, and Emmett, 2015)
- Leptobrachella itiokai Eto, Matsui, and Nishikawa, 2016
- Leptobrachella jinshaensis Cheng, Shi, Li, Liu, Li, and Wang, 2021
- Leptobrachella jinyunensis Shi, Shen, Wang, Jiang, and Wang, 2023
- Leptobrachella juliandringi Eto, Matsui, and Nishikawa, 2015
- Leptobrachella kajangensis (Grismer, Grismer, and Youmans, 2004)
- Leptobrachella kalonensis (Rowley, Tran, Le, Dau, Peloso, Nguyen, Hoang, Nguyen, and Ziegler, 2016)
- Leptobrachella kecil (Matsui, Belabut, Ahmad, and Yong, 2009)
- Leptobrachella khasiorum (Das, Tron, Rangad, and Hooroo, 2010
- Leptobrachella korifi Matsui, Panha, and Eto, 2023
- Leptobrachella kungfu Zhang, Lin, Li, Su, Chen, Zhang, Zeng, and Wang, 2025
- Leptobrachella lateralis (Anderson, 1871)
- Leptobrachella laui (Sung, Yang, and Wang, 2014)
- Leptobrachella liui Fei and Ye, 1990
- Leptobrachella macrops (Duong, Do, Ngo, Nguyen, and Poyarkov, 2018)
- Leptobrachella maculosa (Rowley, Tran, Le, Dau, Peloso, Nguyen, Hoang, Nguyen, and Ziegler, 2016)
- Leptobrachella mangshanensis (Hou, Zhang, Hu, Li, Shi, Chen, Mo, and Wang, 2018)
- Leptobrachella maoershanensis (Yuan, Sun, Chen, Rowley, and Che, 2017)
- Leptobrachella marmorata (Matsui, Zainudin, and Nishikawa, 2014)
- Leptobrachella maura (Inger, Lakim, Biun, and Yambun, 1997)
- Leptobrachella melanoleuca (Matsui, 2006)
- Leptobrachella melica (Rowley, Stuart, Neang, and Emmett, 2010)
- Leptobrachella minima (Taylor, 1962)
- Leptobrachella mjobergi Smith, 1925
- Leptobrachella murphyi Chen, Suwannapoom, Wu, Poyarkov, Xu, Pawangkhanant, and Che, 2021
- Leptobrachella nahangensis (Lathrop, Murphy, Orlov, and Ho, 1998)
- Leptobrachella namdongensis Hoang, Nguyen, Luu, Nguyen, and Jiang, 2019
- Leptobrachella natunae (Günther, 1895)
- Leptobrachella neangi Stuart and Rowley, 2020
- Leptobrachella niveimontis Chen, Poyarkov, Yuan, and Che, 2020
- Leptobrachella nokrekensis (Mathew and Sen, 2010)
- Leptobrachella nyx (Ohler, Wollenberg, Grosjean, Hendrix, Vences, Ziegler, and Dubois, 2011)
- Leptobrachella oshanensis (Liu, 1950)
- Leptobrachella pallida (Rowley, Tran, Le, Dau, Peloso, Nguyen, Hoang, Nguyen, and Ziegler, 2016)
- Leptobrachella palmata Inger and Stuebing, 1992
- Leptobrachella parva Dring, 1983
- Leptobrachella pelodytoides (Boulenger, 1893)
- Leptobrachella petrops (Rowley, Dau, Hoang, Le, Cutajar, and Nguyen, 2017)
- Leptobrachella phiadenensis Luong, Hoang, Pham, Ziegler, and Nguyen, 2023
- Leptobrachella phiaoacensis Luong, Hoang, Pham, Ziegler, and Nguyen, 2023
- Leptobrachella picta (Malkmus, 1992)
- Leptobrachella pingbianensis (Rao, Hui, Zhu, and Ma, 2022 "2020")
- Leptobrachella platycephala (Dehling, 2012)
- Leptobrachella pluvialis (Ohler, Marquis, Swan, and Grosjean, 2000)
- Leptobrachella puhoatensis (Rowley, Dau, and Cao, 2017)
- Leptobrachella purpuraventra Wang, Li, Li, Chen, and Wang, 2019
- Leptobrachella purpurus (Yang, Zeng, and Wang, 2018)
- Leptobrachella pyrrhops (Poyarkov, Rowley, Gogoleva, Vassilieva, Galoyan, and Orlov, 2015)
- Leptobrachella rowleyae (Nguyen, Poyarkov, Le, Vo, Ninh, Duong, Murphy, and Sang, 2018)
- Leptobrachella rubromammata Poyarkov, Nguyen, Duong, Le, and Orlov, 2025
- Leptobrachella sabahmontana (Matsui, Nishikawa, and Yambun, 2014)
- Leptobrachella sarawakensis Matsui, Nishikawa, and Eto, 2025
- Leptobrachella serasanae Dring, 1983
- Leptobrachella shangsiensis Chen, Liao, Zhou, and Mo, 2019
- Leptobrachella shimentaina Wang, Lyu, and Wang, 2022
- Leptobrachella shiwandashanensis Chen, Peng, Pan, Liao, Liu, and Huang, 2021
- Leptobrachella sinorensis Matsui, Panha, and Eto, 2023
- Leptobrachella sola (Matsui, 2006)
- Leptobrachella suiyangensis Luo, Xiao, Gao, and Zhou, 2020
- Leptobrachella sungi (Lathrop, Murphy, Orlov, and Ho, 1998)
- Leptobrachella tadungensis (Rowley, Tran, Le, Dau, Peloso, Nguyen, Hoang, Nguyen, and Ziegler, 2016)
- Leptobrachella tamdil (Sengupta, Sailo, Lalremsanga, Das, and Das, 2010)
- Leptobrachella tengchongensis (Yang, Wang, Chen, and Rao, 2016)
- Leptobrachella tuberosa (Inger, Orlov, and Darevsky, 1999)
- Leptobrachella ventripunctata (Fei, Ye, and Li, 1990)
- Leptobrachella verrucosa Wang, Zeng, Lin, and Li, 2022
- Leptobrachella weixinensis Liu, Chen, Xu, and Wu, 2025
- Leptobrachella wuhuangmontis Wang, Yang, and Wang, 2018
- Leptobrachella wulingensis Qian, Xiao, Cao, Xiao, and Yang, 2020
- Leptobrachella wumingensis Chen, Peng, Li, and Yu, 2023
- Leptobrachella xinshaoensis Jiang et al., 2026
- Leptobrachella xishuiensis Luo, Zhao, Wang, Lan, Xiao, Deng, Xiao, and Zhou, 2025
- Leptobrachella yachangensis Huang, Zeng, Wang, Wang, Deng, Dong, Liao, and Mo, 2025
- Leptobrachella yeae Shi, Hou, Song, Jiang, and Wang, 2021
- Leptobrachella yingjiangensis (Yang, Zeng, and Wang, 2018)
- Leptobrachella yongshunensis Huang, Wu, Jiang, and Zhang, 2025
- Leptobrachella yunkaiensis Wang, Li, Lyu, and Wang, 2018
- Leptobrachella yunyangensis Luo, Deng, and Zhou, 2022
- Leptobrachella zhangyapingi (Jiang, Yan, Suwannapoom, Chomdej, and Che, 2013)
