= Leptobrachella nokrekensis =

Conservation status
- Data Deficient (IUCN 3.1)

Scientific classification
- Kingdom: Animalia
- Phylum: Chordata
- Class: Amphibia
- Order: Anura
- Family: Megophryidae
- Genus: Leptobrachella
- Species: L. nokrekensis

Binomial name
- Leptobrachella nokrekensis (Mathew and Sen, 2010)
- Leptobrachella nokrekensis is only known from the Nokrek Biosphere Reserve in Meghalaya, India

Synonyms
- Leptobrachium nokrekensis Mathew and Sen, 2010 "2009"; Leptolalax nokrekensis (Mathew and Sen, 2010)

Species of frog

Leptobrachella nokrekensis is a species of frog in the family Megophryidae. It is endemic to Northeast India and known only from the Nokrek Biosphere Reserve in East Garo Hills district, Meghalaya. Common names Nokrek megophryid frog and Nokrek's spadefoot toad have been proposed for it.

== Description ==
Males measure 26–33 mm (1.0–1.3 in) and females, based on two specimens, 34–35 mm (1.3–1.4 in) in snout–vent length. The head is broader than it is long but narrower than the body. The tympanum is sunk and vertically oval; the supratympanic fold is distinct. The eyes are bulging. The dorsum has tubercles and a few longitudinal folds. A prominent skin fold overhangs the vent. The forelimbs are slender and moderate in length. The fingers are free of webbing and have rounded tips that are slightly swollen but not disc-like. The hind limbs are relatively long. The toes have basal webbing. The dorsum is brownish with dark irregular markings all over, powdered with white. There is a triangular mark between the eyes, followed by an inverted Y-shaped mark. The belly is creamy and laterally bordered with blackish spots and a line of white glandular tubercles. A pair of reddish warts are located below and above the vent. The forelimbs have cross-bands, and the hind limbs have black bands. The iris has a fine dark network or reticulation.

== Habitat and conservation ==
The type series was collected from a river/stream inside the reserve forest at elevations between 964 and 1,054 m (3,163 and 3,458 ft) above sea level. As of May 2020, Leptolalax nokrekensis had not been assessed for the IUCN Red List of Threatened Species, while the India Biodiversity Portal lists it as "data deficient".
