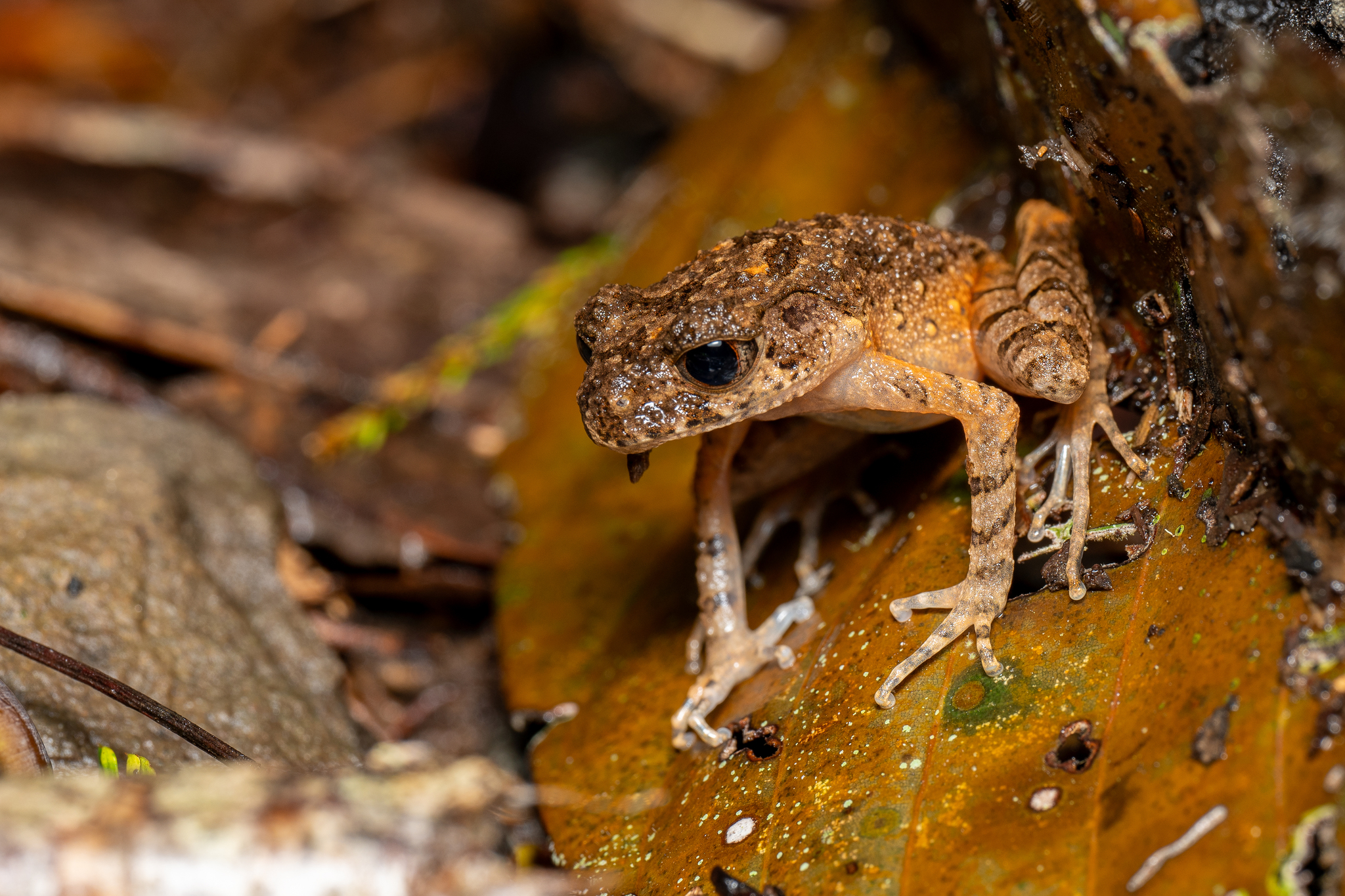

Conservation status
- Near Threatened (IUCN 3.1)

Scientific classification
- Kingdom: Animalia
- Phylum: Chordata
- Class: Amphibia
- Order: Anura
- Family: Megophryidae
- Genus: Leptobrachella
- Species: L. arayai

Binomial name
- Leptobrachella arayai (Matsui, 1997)

Synonyms
- Leptolalax arayai Matsui, 1997

= Leptobrachella arayai =

Species of frog

Leptobrachella arayai is a species of frog in the family Megophryidae. It is endemic to Sabah, Malaysia. In addition to its type locality, Mount Kinabalu, it is known from Mount Trusmadi, Crocker Range, and Mendolog. Its natural habitats are tropical moist lowland forests, moist montane forests, and rivers. It is threatened by habitat loss.
