= Leptobrachella baluensis =

Conservation status
- Least Concern (IUCN 3.1)

Scientific classification
- Kingdom: Animalia
- Phylum: Chordata
- Class: Amphibia
- Order: Anura
- Family: Megophryidae
- Genus: Leptobrachella
- Species: L. baluensis

Binomial name
- Leptobrachella baluensis Smith, 1931

Species of amphibian

Leptobrachella baluensis (Kamborangah Borneo frog or Kinabalu dwarf litter frog) is a species of amphibian in the family Megophryidae. It is endemic to montane northern Borneo in Sabah and Sarawak (Malaysia) and northern Kalimantan (Indonesia). It has been in synonymy with Leptobrachella mjobergi, but is now treated as a valid species.

== Description ==
Both males and females grow to about 20 mm (0.79 in) in snout–vent length. They are grey above with dark markings with light-colored borders. Supratympanic fold is black, forming a sharp border towards the dorsum. There is no webbing in the feet. Males have a very loud, high-pitched buzzing call.

Tadpoles are very slender with long tails and move in a characteristic, undulating fashion.

== Habitat and conservation ==
Its natural habitats are sub-montane forests (oak-chestnut and mossy forests) at elevations of 750–1,800 m (2,460–5,910 ft) asl (range 900–2200 m is given for Sabah and Sarawak). Tadpoles develop in streams with coarse gravel beds, hiding in the interstitial space.

Leptobrachella baluensis is threatened by habitat loss, but it occurs in several protected areas.
