= Jinsha leaf litter toad =

Scientific classification
- Domain: Eukaryota
- Kingdom: Animalia
- Phylum: Chordata
- Class: Amphibia
- Order: Anura
- Family: Megophryidae
- Genus: Leptobrachella
- Species: L. jinshaensis

Binomial name
- Leptobrachella jinshaensis Cheng, Shi, Li, Liu, Li & Wang, 2021

Species of toad endemic to Eastern Asia

The Jinsha leaf litter toad (Leptobrachella jinshaensis) is a toad species that is endemic to Eastern Asia in China. Within the country, it is found in Guizhou and a couple of male specimens measured 29.7 to 31.2 mm (1.17 to 1.23 in).
