= Leptobrachella juliandringi =

Conservation status
- Least Concern (IUCN 3.1)

Scientific classification
- Kingdom: Animalia
- Phylum: Chordata
- Class: Amphibia
- Order: Anura
- Family: Megophryidae
- Genus: Leptobrachella
- Species: L. juliandringi

Binomial name
- Leptobrachella juliandringi Eto, Matsui, and Nishikawa, 2015

Species of amphibian

Leptobrachella juliandringi, commonly called Dring's dwarf litter frog, is a species of frogs in the family Megophryidae. It is endemic to Borneo, occurring in both Malaysia and Indonesia.
