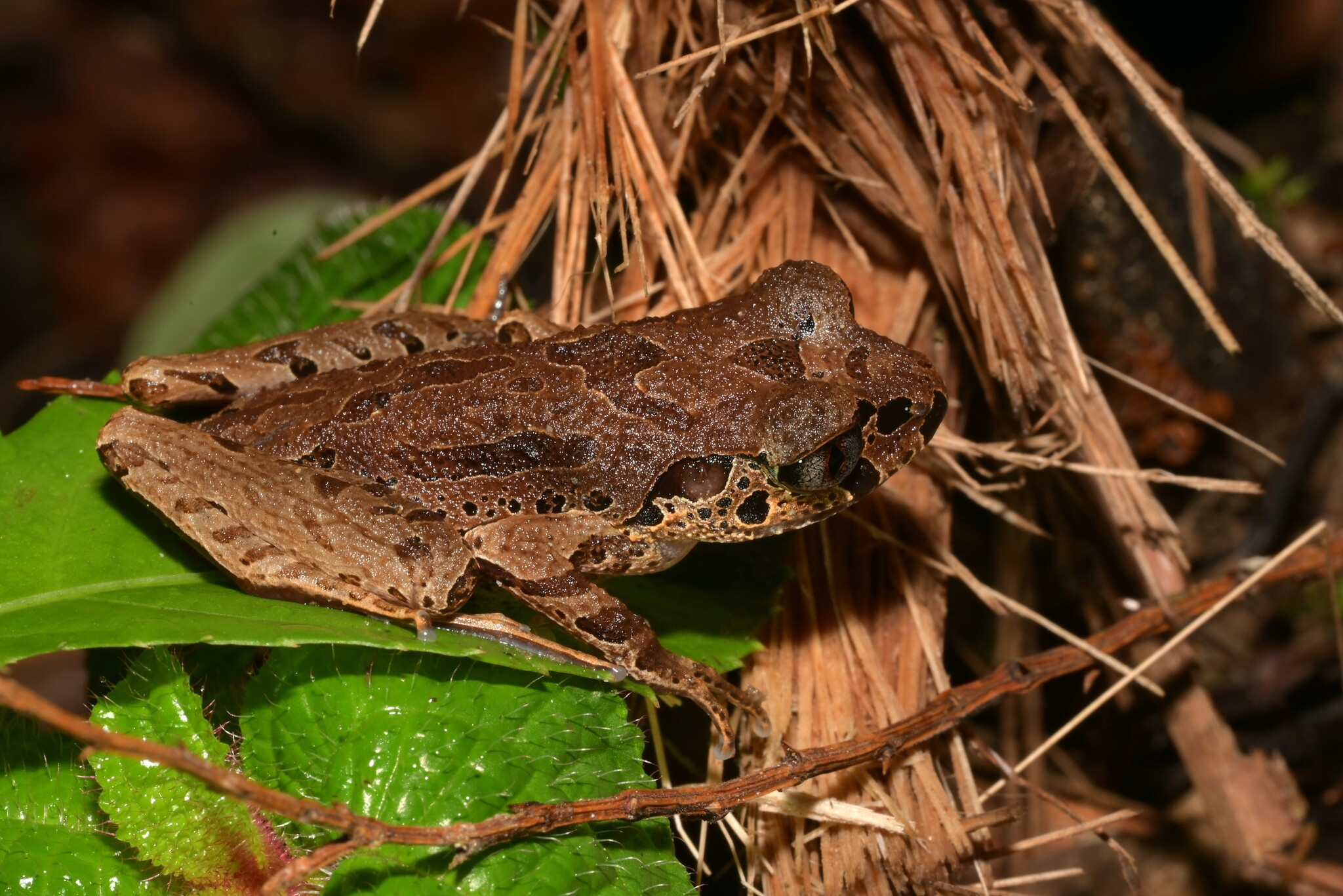

Conservation status
- Least Concern (IUCN 3.1)

Scientific classification
- Kingdom: Animalia
- Phylum: Chordata
- Class: Amphibia
- Order: Anura
- Family: Megophryidae
- Genus: Leptobrachella
- Species: L. picta

Binomial name
- Leptobrachella picta (Malkmus, 1992)

Synonyms
- Leptolalax pictus Malkmus, 1992

= Leptobrachella picta =

Species of frog

Leptobrachella picta is a species of frog in the family Megophryidae. It is found in northern Borneo: Crocker Range, Sabah and eastern Sarawak Malaysia, as well as adjacent north-eastern Kalimantan, Indonesia. Its type locality is Mount Kinabalu. Its natural habitats are tropical moist lowland forests, moist montane forests, and rivers. It is threatened by habitat loss.
