= Leptobrachella bourreti =

Conservation status
- Vulnerable (IUCN 3.1)

Scientific classification
- Kingdom: Animalia
- Phylum: Chordata
- Class: Amphibia
- Order: Anura
- Family: Megophryidae
- Genus: Leptobrachella
- Species: L. bourreti

Binomial name
- Leptobrachella bourreti (Dubois, 1983)
- Distribution of L. bourreti

Synonyms
- Leptolalax bourreti Dubois, 1983; Leptolalax (Lalax) bourreti Delorme, Dubois, Grosjean, & Ohler, 2006; Leptolalax (Lalos) bourreti Dubois, Grosjean, Ohler, Adler, & Zhao, 2010

Species of amphibian

Leptobrachella bourreti (Bourret's Asian toad or Bourret litter frog) is a frog species in the family Megophryidae. It is known with certainty only from the vicinity of its type locality in Sa Pa in northern Vietnam. Earlier records from Laos refer to Leptobrachella eos (described in 2011) and those from Thailand probably to an unnamed species. Its natural habitats are subtropical moist lowland forests, moist montane forests, and rivers. It is currently classified as vulnerable by the IUCN.

== Description ==
Leptobrachella bourreti is large for its genus: males measure 28–36 mm (1.1–1.4 in) and females 42–45 mm (1.7–1.8 in) in snout-vent length. Their back is reddish, greenish, or brown with dark spots, with moderate dark spots on the sides. The colouration of irises is variable, clearer above, and coppery, green, or brownish.
