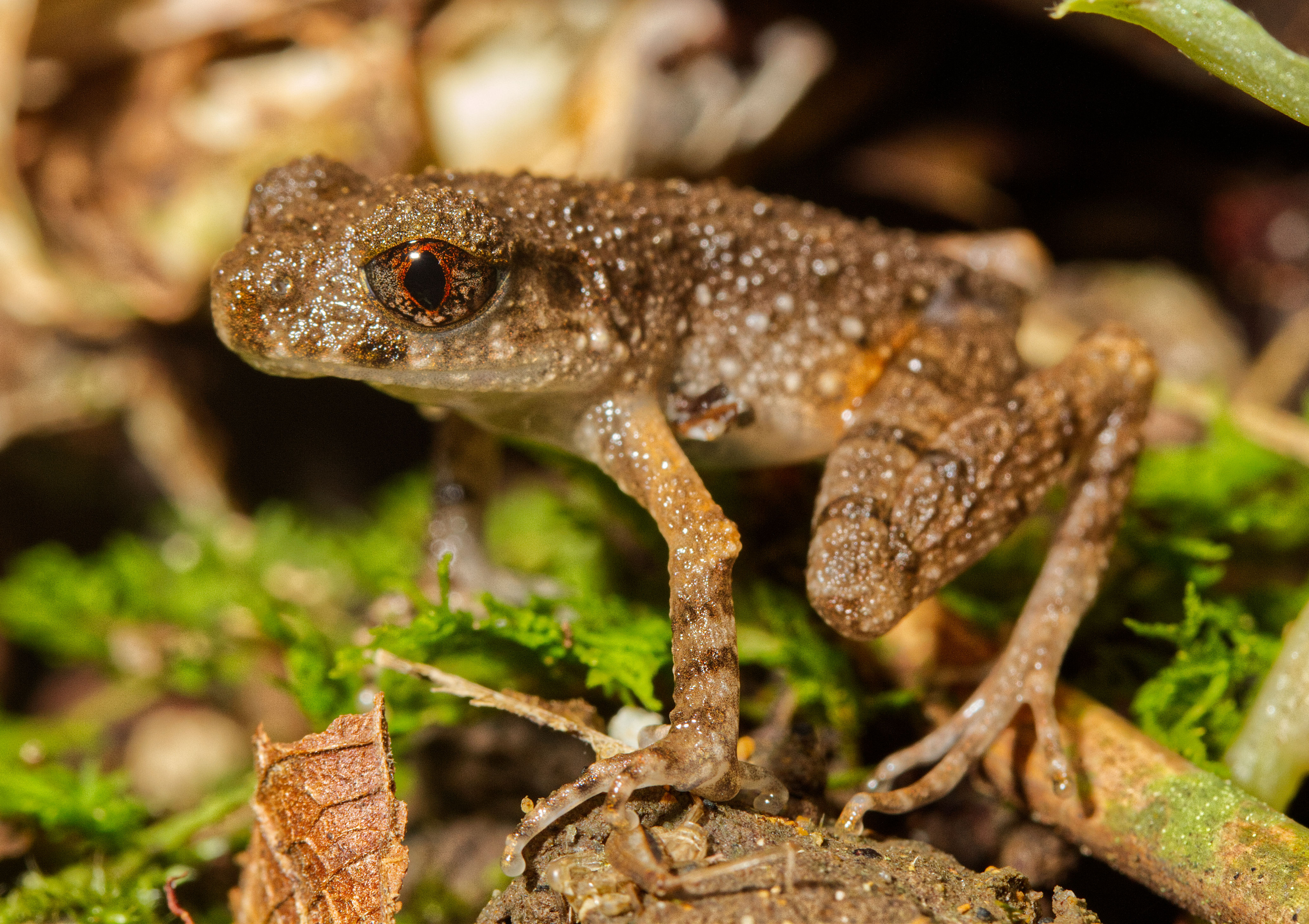
- in Kinabalu Park

Conservation status
- Least Concern (IUCN 3.1)

Scientific classification
- Kingdom: Animalia
- Phylum: Chordata
- Class: Amphibia
- Order: Anura
- Family: Megophryidae
- Genus: Leptobrachella
- Species: L. dringi

Binomial name
- Leptobrachella dringi (Dubois, 1987)

Synonyms
- Leptolalax dringi Dubois, 1987

= Leptobrachella dringi =

Species of amphibian

Leptobrachella dringi (Dring's Asian toad) is a frog species in the family Megophryidae. It is endemic to Borneo and found in Kalimantan (Indonesia) and in Sarawak and Sabah (Malaysia). Its type locality is Mount Mulu in Gunung Mulu National Park. Its natural habitats are tropical moist lowland forests, moist montane forests, and rivers. It is becoming rare due to habitat loss.
