= Leptobrachella maura =

Conservation status
- Near Threatened (IUCN 3.1)

Scientific classification
- Kingdom: Animalia
- Phylum: Chordata
- Class: Amphibia
- Order: Anura
- Family: Megophryidae
- Genus: Leptobrachella
- Species: L. maura

Binomial name
- Leptobrachella maura (Inger, Lakim, Biun & Yambun, 1997)

Synonyms
- Leptolalax maurus Inger, Lakim, Biun, and Imbun, 1997

Species of amphibian

Leptobrachella maura is a frog species in the family Megophryidae. It is endemic to Borneo where it is only known from its type locality, Mount Kinabalu in Sabah, Malaysia. Its natural habitats are tropical moist montane forests and rivers. It is primarily threatened by natural disasters (i.e., earthquakes).
