= Leptobrachella pluvialis =

Conservation status
- Endangered (IUCN 3.1)

Scientific classification
- Kingdom: Animalia
- Phylum: Chordata
- Class: Amphibia
- Order: Anura
- Family: Megophryidae
- Genus: Leptobrachella
- Species: L. pluvialis

Binomial name
- Leptobrachella pluvialis (Ohler, Marquis, Swan & Grosjean, 2000)
- Distribution of L. pluvialis

Synonyms
- Leptolalax pluvialis Ohler et al. 2000

Species of amphibian

Leptobrachella pluvialis (sometimes referred to as the rainy litter toad) is a frog species in the family Megophryidae. It is only known from its type locality, Fansipan mountain range in northern Vietnam, although it is expected to be found also in adjacent Yunnan, China. Its natural habitats are subtropical moist montane forests and rivers. Its status is insufficiently known.

== Description ==
Leptobrachella pluvialis is a small frog: males measure 22–23 mm (0.87–0.91 in) in snout-vent length. Its back is greyish brown with dark pattern with few black spots on its sides. It has dark golden irises.
