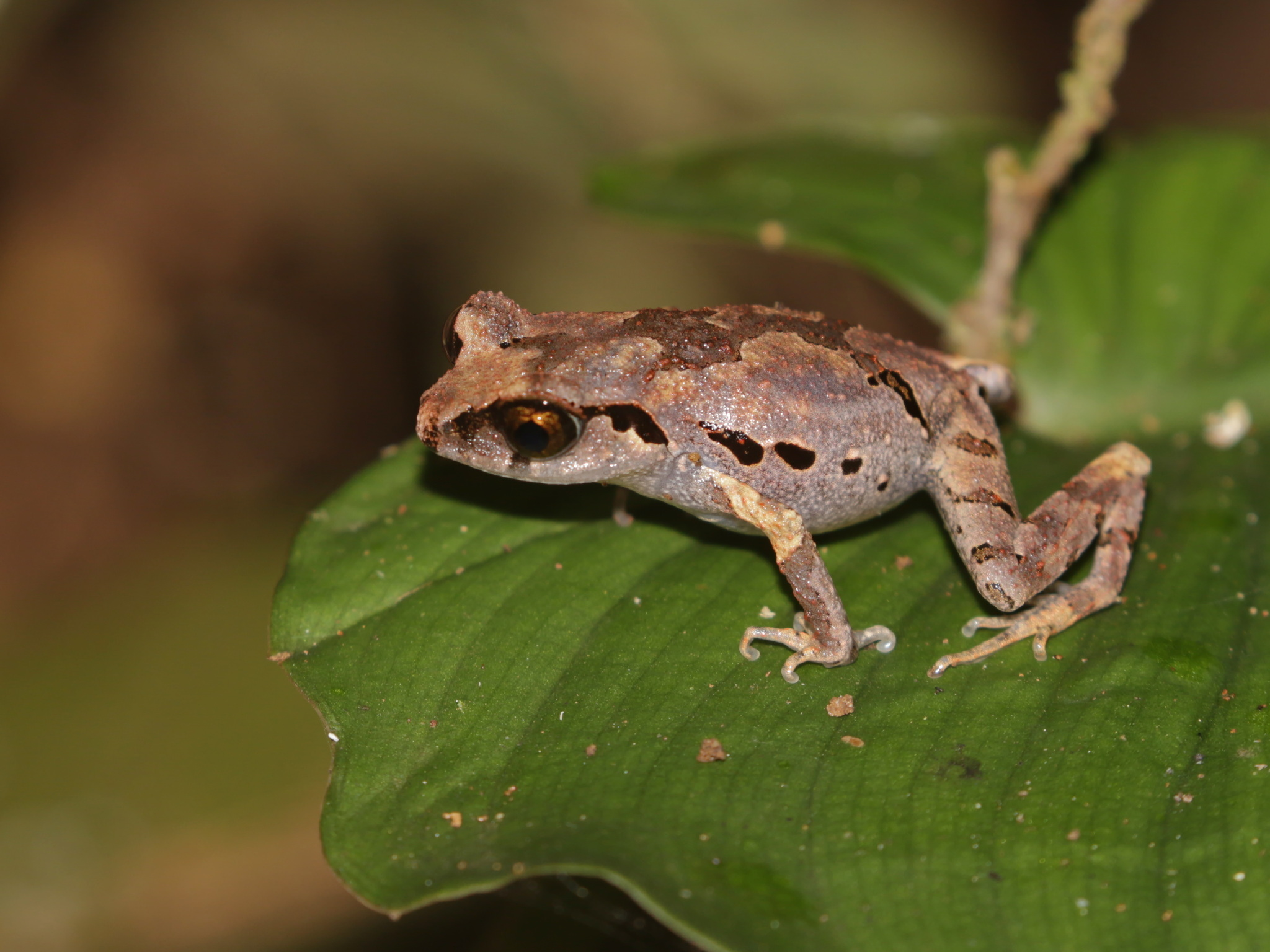

Conservation status
- Least Concern (IUCN 3.1)

Scientific classification
- Kingdom: Animalia
- Phylum: Chordata
- Class: Amphibia
- Order: Anura
- Family: Megophryidae
- Genus: Leptobrachella
- Species: L. heteropus

Binomial name
- Leptobrachella heteropus (Boulenger, 1900)

Synonyms
- Leptobrachium heteropus Boulenger, 1900; Megalophrys heteropus Boulenger, 1908; Megophrys heteropus Smith, 1930; Leptolalax heteropus Dubois, 1983

= Leptobrachella heteropus =

Species of amphibian

Leptobrachella heteropus (Malaysian Asian toad or variable litter frog) is a frog species in the family Megophryidae. It is found in the Malay Peninsula, both in Malaysia and southern Thailand. The type locality is Maxwell Hill in Taiping, Perak, Malaysia. Its natural habitats are tropical moist lowland forests, moist montane forests, and rivers. It is not considered threatened by the IUCN.

Male Leptobrachella heteropus grow to snout-vent length of 24–29 mm (0.94–1.14 in) and females to 32–36 mm (1.3–1.4 in). These frogs are usually encountered while perched on the leaves of small plants close to the ground. The call of male L. heteropus is short and consists of a short series of 3–6 notes, the first note being longer in duration and higher in dominant frequency than subsequent ones. The call characteristics are among the features that separate this species from superficially similar Leptobrachella solus. Indeed, frogs reported from Thailand as Leptobrachella heteropus might actually be the relatively recently (2006) described L. solus.
