= Leptobrachella serasanae =

Conservation status
- Near Threatened (IUCN 3.1)

Scientific classification
- Kingdom: Animalia
- Phylum: Chordata
- Class: Amphibia
- Order: Anura
- Family: Megophryidae
- Genus: Leptobrachella
- Species: L. serasanae

Binomial name
- Leptobrachella serasanae Dring, 1983

Species of amphibian

Leptobrachella serasanae (sometimes known as the Serasan Borneo frog) is a species of amphibian in the family Megophryidae. It is found in Pulau Serasan (the type locality; South Natuna, Indonesia) and central Sarawak, Borneo, (Malaysia). Its natural habitats are tropical moist lowland forests and rivers. It is threatened by habitat loss.
