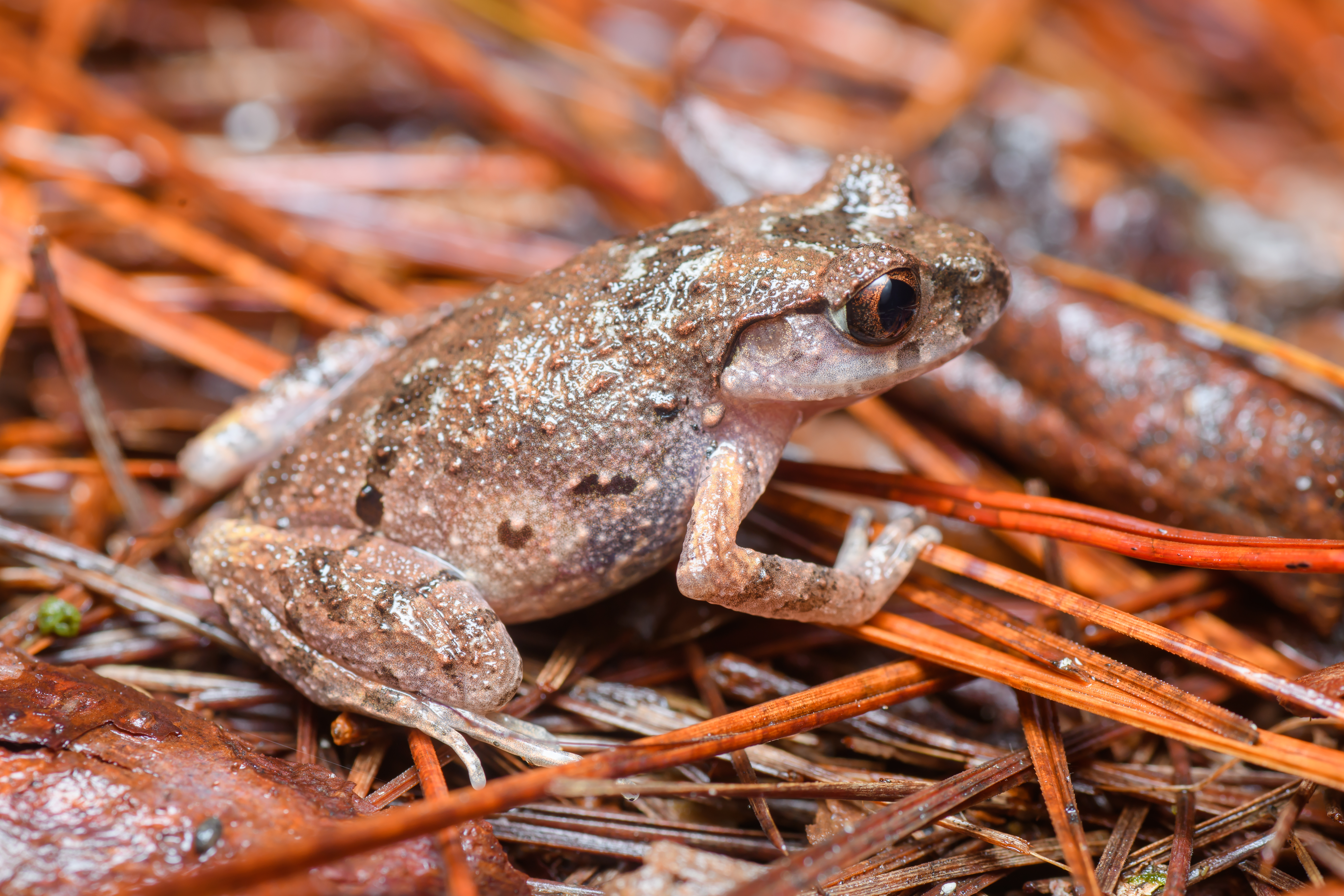
- Phu Kradueng National Park

Conservation status
- Least Concern (IUCN 3.1)

Scientific classification
- Kingdom: Animalia
- Phylum: Chordata
- Class: Amphibia
- Order: Anura
- Family: Megophryidae
- Genus: Leptobrachella
- Species: L. minima

Binomial name
- Leptobrachella minima (Taylor, 1962)

Synonyms
- Leptobrachium minimum Taylor, 1962; Leptolalax minimus (Taylor, 1962)

= Leptobrachella minima =

Species of frog

Leptobrachella minima is a species of frog in the family Megophryidae. It occurs in northern Thailand, northern Laos, and northern–central Vietnam.

Leptobrachella minima occurs in association with small to moderate streams in hilly evergreen forest at elevations of 131–1,390 m (430–4,560 ft) above sea level. It is locally threatened by habitat loss caused by deforestation driven by agricultural expansion. It occurs in many protected areas.

== Photos ==
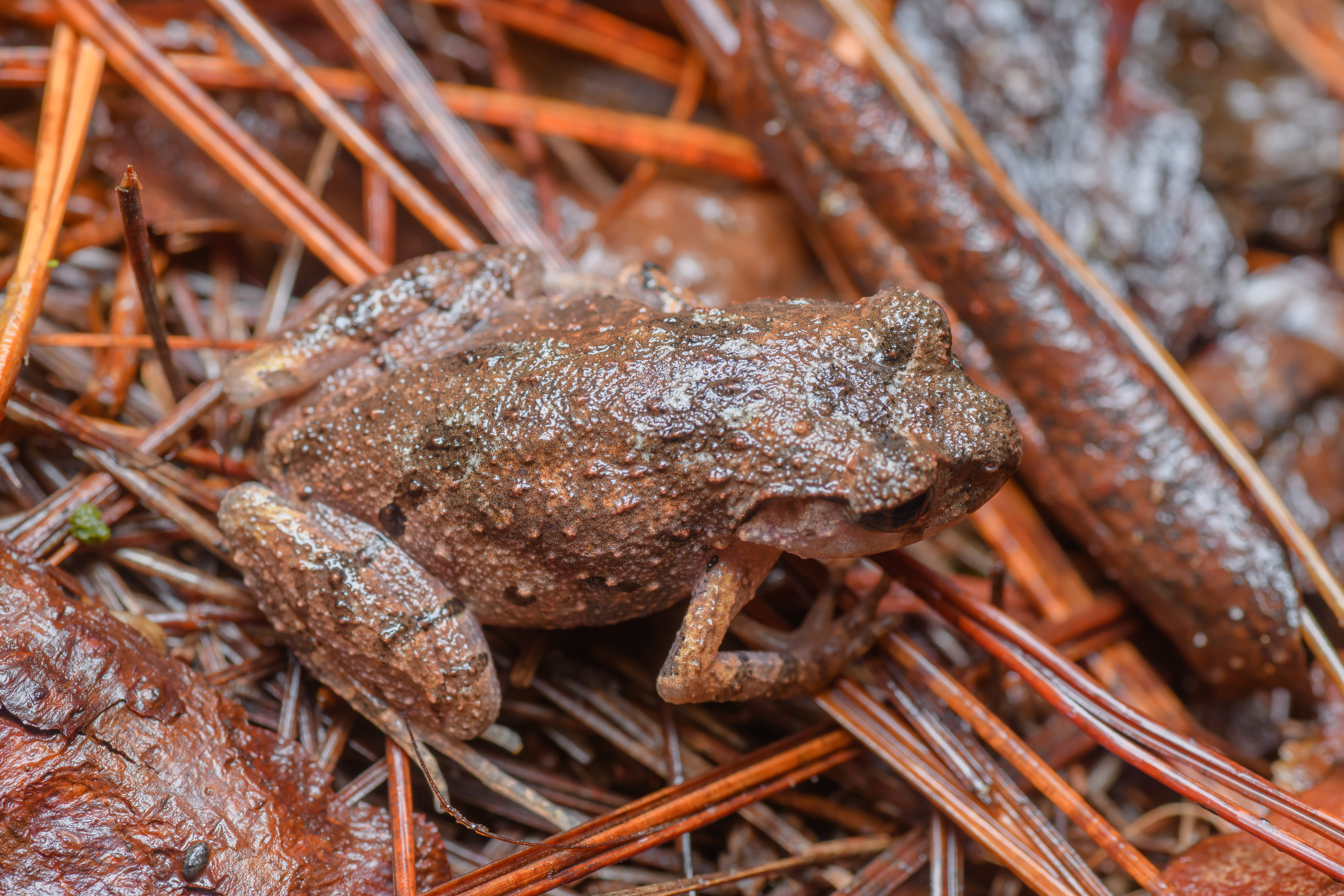
Phu Kradueng National Park
