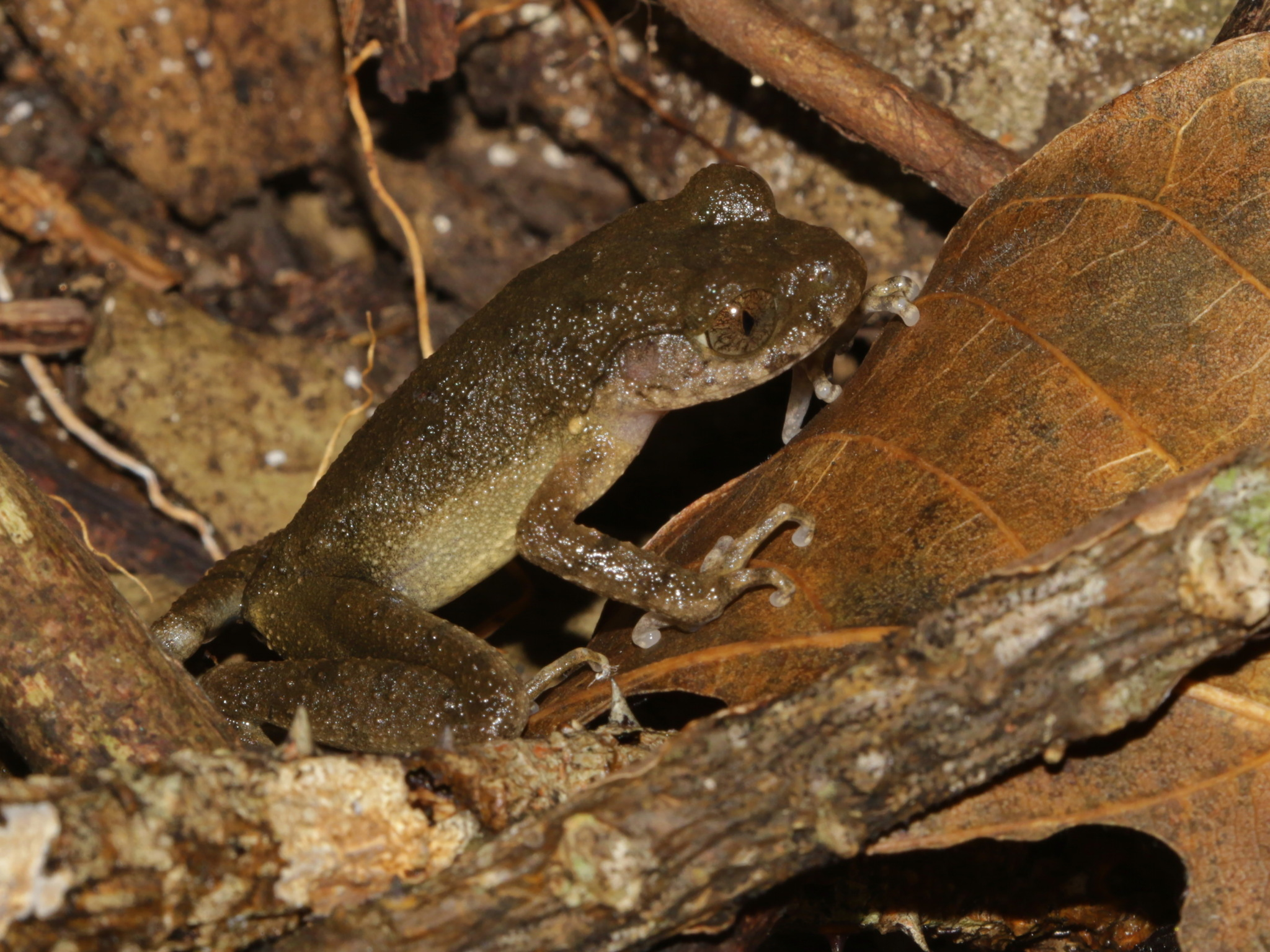

Conservation status
- Least Concern (IUCN 3.1)

Scientific classification
- Kingdom: Animalia
- Phylum: Chordata
- Class: Amphibia
- Order: Anura
- Family: Megophryidae
- Genus: Leptobrachella
- Species: L. eos

Binomial name
- Leptobrachella eos (Ohler, Wollenberg, Grosjean, Hendrix, Vences, Ziegler, and Dubois, 2011)

Synonyms
- Leptolalax (Lalos) eos Ohler, Wollenberg, Grosjean, Hendrix, Vences, Ziegler, and Dubois, 2011

= Leptobrachella eos =

Species of frog

Leptobrachella eos, also known as the rosy litter frog, is a species of frog in the family Megophryidae. It is known in Bo Kluea District in northern Thailand; Phongsaly, Bolikhamxay, Oudomxai and Xaisomboun Provinces in Laos; Dien Bien, Thanh Hoa and Son La Provinces in northwestern Vietnam, and Yunnan, China. It was previously confused with Leptobrachella bourreti.
