= Leptobrachella kajangensis =

Conservation status
- Least Concern (IUCN 3.1)

Scientific classification
- Kingdom: Animalia
- Phylum: Chordata
- Class: Amphibia
- Order: Anura
- Family: Megophryidae
- Genus: Leptobrachella
- Species: L. kajangensis

Binomial name
- Leptobrachella kajangensis (Grismer, Grismer, and Youmans, 2004)
- Leptobrachella kajangensis is only known from Tioman Island, Malaysia

Synonyms
- Leptolalax kajangensis Grismer, Grismer, and Youmans, 2004

Species of amphibian

Leptobrachella kajangensis, also known as the Kajang slender litter frog, is a species of amphibian in the family Megophryidae. Its natural habitats are rivers and caves. The species is endemic to Malaysia and only known from its type locality, a small cave near the top of Gunung Kajang (=Mount Kajang), on Tioman Island, a small island located 32 km off the east coast of Peninsular Malaysia.

== Description ==
The type series consists of two adult males measuring 35–36 mm (1.4–1.4 in) in snout–vent length—a relatively large size for the genus Leptolalax (now Leptobrachella). The type locality is a cave, and the type specimens were observed calling near the edge of a pond in the cave. Some tadpoles were collected from the same pond and assumed to represent the same species. There is also an earlier collection of tadpoles from a lower altitude on the same mountain that are morphologically similar to the ones at the type locality but that differ in colouration; they might represent another species.

== Biogeography ==
Tioman Island was connected with Peninsular Malaysia as late as the Pleistocene. However, Grismer et al. considered it unlikely that Leptolalax kajangensis could have dispersed over flat, low-lying landscape to Gunung Kajang; instead, they suggest that the presence of this species on Tioman Island represents much older vicariance, that is, the species (or its ancestors) would have reached Tioman Island when it was still part of a larger mountainous landscape.
