= Leptobrachella parva =

Conservation status
- Least Concern (IUCN 3.1)

Scientific classification
- Kingdom: Animalia
- Phylum: Chordata
- Class: Amphibia
- Order: Anura
- Family: Megophryidae
- Genus: Leptobrachella
- Species: L. parva

Binomial name
- Leptobrachella parva Dring, 1983

Species of amphibian

Leptobrachella parva (sometimes known as the Gunung Mulu Borneo frog) is a species of amphibians in the family Megophryidae. It is endemic to Borneo and found in Sarawak and Sabah, Malaysia. Its natural habitats are tropical moist lowland forests and rivers. It is locally abundant but threatened by habitat loss.
