= Leptobrachella brevicrus =

Conservation status
- Near Threatened (IUCN 3.1)

Scientific classification
- Kingdom: Animalia
- Phylum: Chordata
- Class: Amphibia
- Order: Anura
- Family: Megophryidae
- Genus: Leptobrachella
- Species: L. brevicrus

Binomial name
- Leptobrachella brevicrus Dring, 1983

Species of amphibian

Leptobrachella brevicrus (sometimes known as the Dring's Borneo frog) Leptobrachella brevicrus is a species of frog in the family Megophryidae, native to Southeast Asia. It was first described by Matsui in 1997 and is known for its relatively short limbs (hence "brevicrus," meaning "short legs"), distinguishing it from other species within the genus Leptobrachellascription and Habitat This small frog, measuring about 20-30 mm, has smooth skin with a brownish-green coloration for camouflage in its forest environment. L. brevicrus inhabits moist montane forests, particularly near fast-flowing streams, where it can find ample food and suitable conditions for reproduction. Its natural habitat are stream sides in tropical moist montane forests.
