= Leptobrachella platycephala =

Conservation status
- Data Deficient (IUCN 3.1)

Scientific classification
- Kingdom: Animalia
- Phylum: Chordata
- Class: Amphibia
- Order: Anura
- Family: Megophryidae
- Genus: Leptobrachella
- Species: L. platycephala

Binomial name
- Leptobrachella platycephala (Dehling, 2012)

Synonyms
- Leptolalax platycephalus Dehling, 2012

Species of amphibian

Leptobrachella platycephala is a species of frogs in the family Megophryidae. It is endemic to Peninsular Malaysia and known only from its type locality, Mount Benum in Pahang.
