= Leptobrachella oshanensis =

Conservation status
- Least Concern (IUCN 3.1)

Scientific classification
- Kingdom: Animalia
- Phylum: Chordata
- Class: Amphibia
- Order: Anura
- Family: Megophryidae
- Genus: Leptobrachella
- Species: L. oshanensis

Binomial name
- Leptobrachella oshanensis (Liu, 1950)

Synonyms
- Megophrys oshanensis Liu, 1950 Paramegophrys oshanensis (Liu, 1950) Leptolalax oshanensis (Liu, 1950)

Species of amphibian

Leptobrachella oshanensis, also known as the Oshan metacarpal-tubercled toad or pigmy crawl frog, is a frog species in the family Megophryidae. It is endemic to southern–central China (Guizhou, Hubei, Gansu, and Sichuan provinces as well as the municipality of Chongqing). Its type locality is Mount Emei (Chinese: 峨嵋山; pinyin: Éméi Shān; Wade–Giles: O^{2}-mei^{2} Shan^{1}). The same mountain has given the species its name. (Note: This connection is now obscured because "Oshan" is a contraction of the transliteration that is no longer widely used, Omeishan.) It has also been reported from Thailand and Laos, but these are now considered to represent Leptobrachella minimus.

Leptobrachella oshanensis occurs in hill streams as well as the surrounding broadleaf and mixed forests at elevations of 600–1,800 m (2,000–5,900 ft) above sea level. It is not considered threatened by the IUCN.

Leptobrachella oshanensis is a small frog: males grow to a snout–vent length of about 28 mm (1.1 in) and females to 32 mm (1.3 in).
