= Leptobrachella mjobergi =

Conservation status
- Data Deficient (IUCN 3.1)

Scientific classification
- Kingdom: Animalia
- Phylum: Chordata
- Class: Amphibia
- Order: Anura
- Family: Megophryidae
- Genus: Leptobrachella
- Species: L. mjobergi

Binomial name
- Leptobrachella mjobergi Smith, 1925

Species of amphibian

Leptobrachella mjobergi (sometimes known as the Mount Gadin Borneo frog or Mjöberg's dwarf litter frog) is a species of frogs in the family Megophryidae. It is endemic to Borneo where it is found in Kalimantan (Indonesia), Brunei, and Sarawak (Malaysia).

== Description ==
Both males and females grow to about 20 mm (0.79 in) in snout–vent length. They are brown above with dark markings between eyes, on the shoulder, and thighs. The supratympanic fold is not distinct in colouration. The flanks have white glands that can fuse to form a longitudinal ridge. Tips of toes and fingers are pointed. Foot webbing is absent.

=== Tadpoles ===
The tadpoles of Leptobrachella mjobergi are relatively small (total length up to 27 mm (1.1 in)) and have a vermiform or eel-like appearance. The transition from the narrow, cylindrical trunk into the strong tail is nearly seamless, and the tail fin is very low. They have unusually mobile head and trunk. While smaller tadpoles seem to use existing interstitial spaces, larger ones can actively push their way through gravel. They seem to be restricted to gravel habitats in small streams.

== Habitat and conservation ==
Its natural habitats are lowland rainforests. Adults are found on the forest floor, but move to clear, rocky streams to breed. It is threatened by habitat loss (deforestation, and siltation of streams).
