= Masafumi Matsui =

- 松井 正文
- Born: 1950 (age 75–76); Ueda, Nagano, Japan
- Education: Shinshu University, Kyoto University
- Known for: Research on amphibians
- Awards: Zoological Society of Japan Prize (2000)
- Scientific career
- Fields: Zoology, Herpetology, Amphibian biology
- Workplaces: Kyoto University

Masafumi Matsui (松井 正文; born 1950) is a Japanese zoologist and herpetologist, and a professor emeritus at Kyoto University. He is a leading researcher in amphibian studies and a recipient of the Zoological Society of Japan Prize. He also served as president of the Herpetological Society of Japan.

== Biography ==
Matsui was born in Ueda, Nagano, Japan. He graduated from Nagano Prefectural Ueda High School and obtained a degree from the Faculty of Textile Science and Technology, Shinshu University in 1972.

He left the doctoral program at the Graduate School of Science, Kyoto University in 1975 and became an assistant at the Faculty of Liberal Arts, Kyoto University. He earned a Doctor of Science degree in 1984 and became an associate professor at the same faculty in 1987.

In 1991, he was appointed associate professor at the Graduate School of Human and Environmental Studies, Kyoto University, and in 1998 became a full professor there. Matsui received the Zoological Society of Japan Prize in 2000 and was named professor emeritus of Kyoto University in 2015.

He is recognized as one of Japan’s foremost experts in amphibian research and has served as president of the Herpetological Society of Japan.

== Selected works ==
- Maeda, N. & Matsui, M. (1989). Field Guide to the Frogs of Japan. Bunichi Sogo Shuppan, Tokyo. ISBN 4-8299-3022-5 JPNO 000002022868 doi:10.11501/13664161
- Matsui, M. (1996). Evolution of Amphibians. University of Tokyo Press, Tokyo. ISBN 4-13-060163-6 JPNO 000002490706 doi:10.11501/14219987
- Matsui, M. (2002). Frogs: Neighbors of the Waterside. Chuko Shinsho.
- Koike, Y. & Matsui, M. (eds.) (2003). Conservation Genetics. University of Tokyo Press, Tokyo. ISBN 4-13-060213-6 JPNO 000004166397
- Matsui, M. (supervising editor), Seki, S. (text and photographs) (2004). The Great Encyclopedia of Frogs of the World and Japan: 156 Species of World Frogs, 43 Species of Japanese Frogs. ISBN 4-569-68485-8
- Matsui, M. (ed.) (2005). Future Herpetology. Shokabo, Tokyo. ISBN 4-7853-5839-4 JPNO 000007886842
- Matsui, M. (commentary), Seki, S. (photos) (2008). Handbook of Tadpoles, Frogs, Salamanders, and Newts. Bunichi Sogo Shuppan, Tokyo. ISBN 978-4-8299-0132-8
- Mathieson, C. (author), Matsui, M. (Japanese edition supervisor and translator) (2008). World Frog Encyclopedia: 300 Species — Endangered Amphibians and Their Unique Ecology. Neko Publishing. ISBN 978-4-7770-5227-1
- Matsui, M. (2009). Invasive Species Crisis: Even the Moats of the Imperial Palace Are Full of Bullfrogs. Shogakukan 101 Shinsho. ISBN 978-4-09-825061-5
- Matsui, M. (2016). The Frogs of Japan: Taxonomy and Life History – Ecology, Eggs, and Tadpoles of All Species. Seibundo Shinkosha.
- Matsui, M. (2016). Future Herpetology. Shokabo. ISBN 978-4-7853-5867-9
- Matsui, M. (commentary), Maeda, N. (photographs) (2018). Comprehensive Illustrated Guide to the Frogs of Japan. ISBN 978-4-8299-8843-5 JPNO 029120004
- The Herpetological Society of Japan; Matsui, M. & Mori, S. (eds.) (2021). New Illustrated Guide to the Amphibians and Reptiles of Japan. Sunrise Publishing, Shiga. ISBN 978-4-88325-734-8 JPNO 031642635 Revised edition of: Nakamura, K. & Ueno, S. (1963). Coloured Illustrations of the Amphibians and Reptiles of Japan. Hoikusha, Osaka. JPNO 000001044047, doi:10.11501/1384347
- Matsui, M. (author), Seki, S. (photographs) (2025). Illustrated Guide to the Salamanders of Japan. Gijutsu-Hyoronsha, Tokyo. ISBN 978-4-297-14834-8
