= Jodi Rowley =

Australian Herpetologist

Jodi J. L. Rowley
- Education: James Cook University
- Scientific career
- Fields: Herpetology, Conservation biology
- Workplaces: Australian Museum
- Thesis: Why does Chytridiomycosis drive some frog populations to extinction and not others?: the effects of interspecific variation in host behaviour (2006)
- Doctoral advisor: Ross Alford and Lin Schwarzkopf

Jodi J. L. Rowley is an Australian herpetologist and conservationist.

== Life and research ==
Rowley received her bachelor's degree in environmental science at University of New South Wales in Sydney, Australia, and her PhD from James Cook University. Her doctoral thesis was on the topic of amphibian decline caused by chytridiomycosis. After finishing her PhD, in 2006 she moved to Cambodia to work for Conservation International as a wildlife biologist. She returned to Australia in 2008, and began working at the Australian Museum. In 2016, she was appointed curator of Amphibian & Reptile Conservation Biology at the Australian Museum. Her current work concerns a mixture of taxonomy and conservation biology. One of her on-going projects is to search for the Peppered tree frog. She has run numerous research expeditions in Australia and South-East Asia.

Rowley is a member of the New-South Wales Threatened Species Scientific Committee, the IUCN Amphibian Red List Authority, and the Steering Committee of AmphibiaWeb. She is also chair of the Mainland Southeast Asia, IUCN Species Survival Commission Amphibian Specialist Group.

Rowley was one of the co-founders of the FrogID app and is its chief scientist. The app uses citizen science to gather data on the distribution and activity of Australian frogs, to inform both research and conservation.

Rowley is an editor for Amphibia for Zootaxa.

== Matronyms ==
Rowley has had three species named in her honour, one Vietnamese snake, Cylindrophis jodiae, named in 2015; and two Vietnamese frogs, Leptorachella rowleyae named in 2018, and Zhangixalus jodiae named in 2020.
