= White-lipped frog =

White-lipped frog may refer to:

Genera:

- Amnirana, a genus of frogs found in tropical Africa and Asia
- Leptodactylus, a genus of frogs found in the Americas

Species, Asia and Africa:

- Amnirana albolabris
- Chalcorana chalconota
- Chalcorana labialis
- Chalcorana rufipes

Species, Americas:

- Leptodactylus fragilis
- Leptodactylus mystacinus

Numerous other species are contain "white-lipped frog" in their name, including but not restricted to the following:

- Feijo white-lipped frog, a frog found in Brazil and possibly Bolivia and Peru
- White-lipped bright-eyed frog, a frog endemic to Madagascar

== See also ==
- White-lipped tree frog (disambiguation)
