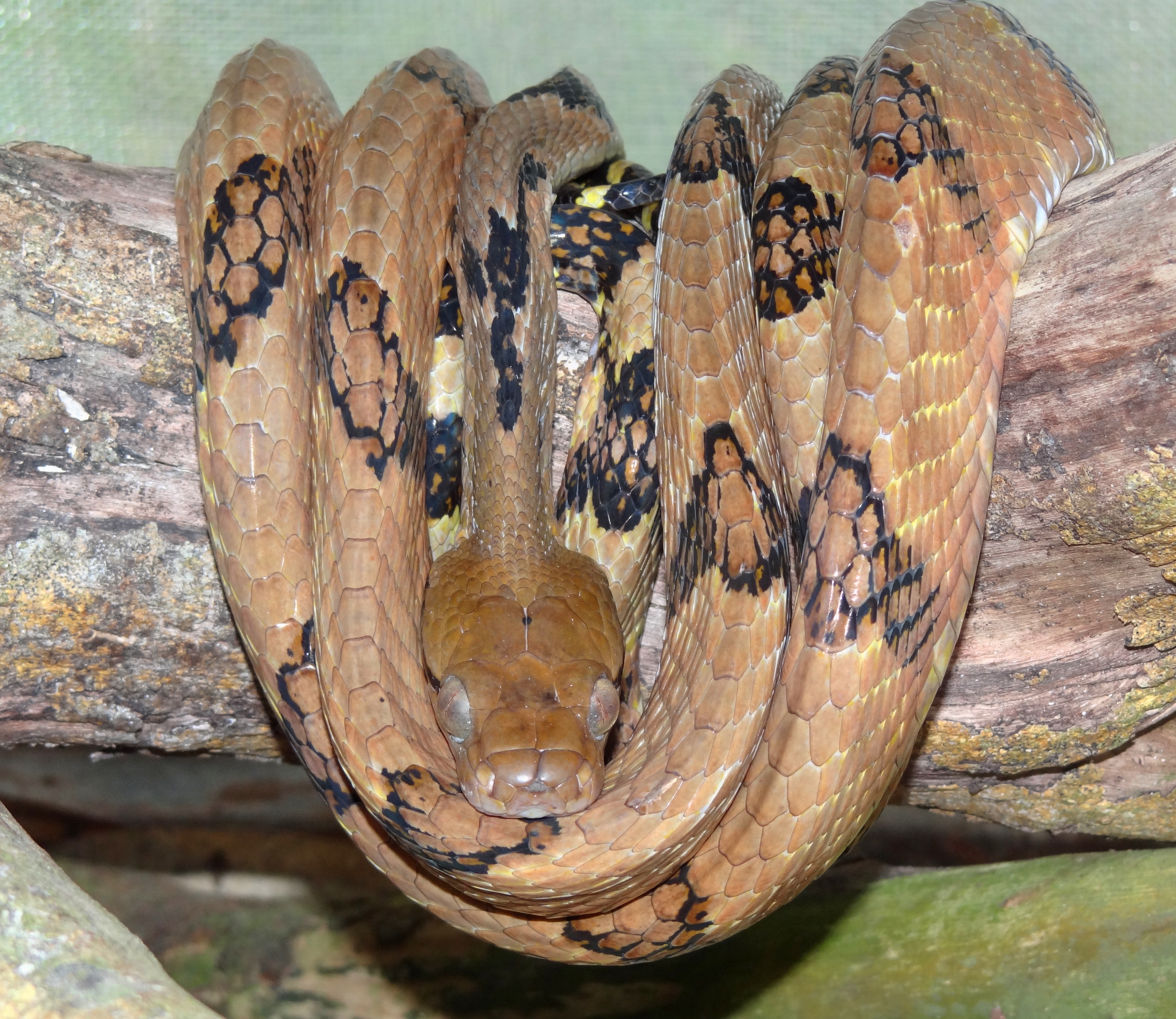

Conservation status
- Least Concern (IUCN 3.1)

Scientific classification
- Kingdom: Animalia
- Phylum: Chordata
- Class: Reptilia
- Order: Squamata
- Suborder: Serpentes
- Family: Colubridae
- Genus: Boiga
- Species: B. cynodon

Binomial name
- Boiga cynodon (F. Boie, 1827)
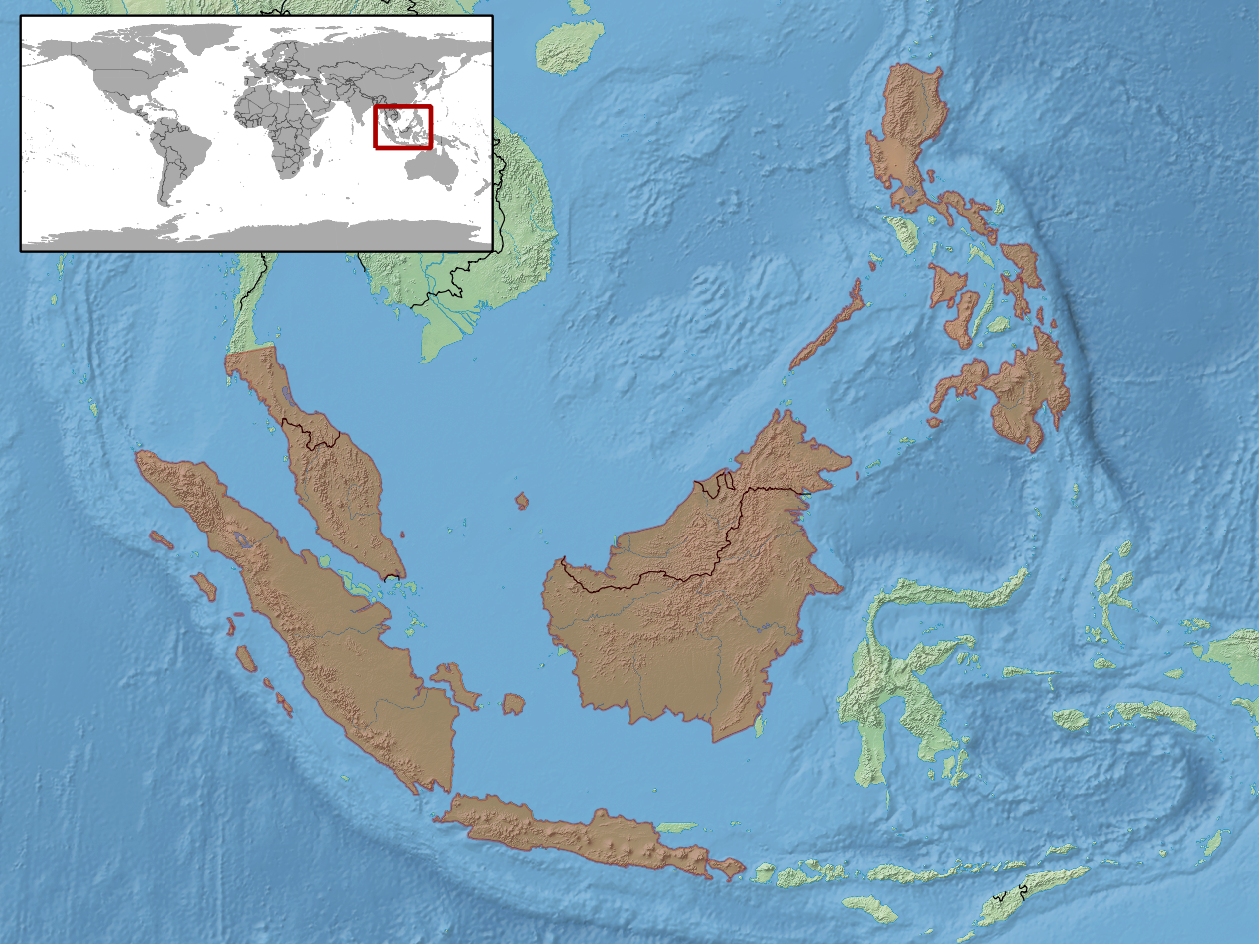

Synonyms
- Dipsas cynodon F. Boie, 1827; Opetiodon cynodon A.M.C. Duméril & Bibron, 1854; Eudipsas cynodon Günther, 1858; Dipsadomorphus cynodon Boulenger, 1896; Boiga cynodon Barbour, 1912

= Boiga cynodon =

Species of snake

Boiga cynodon, commonly known as the dog-toothed cat snake, is a nocturnal species of rear-fanged colubrid snake endemic to Asia.

== Description ==
It is a large snake, reaching more than 2 m (6 1/2 ft) in total length. The front teeth of the upper jaw and the lower jaw are strongly enlarged. The anterior palatine teeth are significantly enlarged, while the posterior chin shields are larger than the anterior ones.

The dorsal scales are smooth and arranged in 23 or 33 rows at midbody, with the scales in the vertebral row being notably enlarged. The species has 248 to 290 ventral scales and 114 to 165 subcaudal scales.

Boiga cynodon can be distinguished from other similar species by several key characteristics. It is slender and laterally compressed. Notably, it has a post-ocular stripe that is distinctly wavy or irregular, unlike the more even or nearly even upper and lower lines found in other similar species. Although coloration can vary, B. cynodon typically features a yellowish or pale reddish-brown dorsal coloration with dark brown or black transverse spots or crossbars. It also has a dark postocular streak of irregular thickness on each side of the head, and its belly is yellowish, sometimes uniformly colored or marbled with brown.

A black color variation has been reported to be found in Indonesian populations.

This species may possess a potent neurotoxic venom; however, the effects have shown to be reversible with neostigmine, suggesting that envenomation from this species is treatable with anticholinesterase therapy.

== Diet ==
It feeds mainly upon small vertebrates such as birds and bird eggs but may also take lizards and small bats.

It has been noted that the dog-toothed cat snake hunts by pursuing and overpowering prey, using both the jaws and tail to immobilize.

== Reproduction ==
Boiga cynodon is an oviparous species, with sexually mature females laying eggs, 6-12 per clutch. Mean egg length is reported as 52mm, while mean width is reported as 24.6mm. Eggs within a clutch often adhere to each other, and offspring have been observed to create a slit from the inside of the egg one day before emerging.

In this species, it is suspected that improper incubation temperature and/or humidity can result in the death of embryos or the emergence of young with spinal deformities.

== Habitat ==
The dog-toothed cat snake is found in a wide range of habitats, from primary and secondary forest to cultivated areas, rural gardens and urban areas. It is often found in coconut plantations. In forested areas, it is known to live in the canopy.

On the island of Bali, Indonesia, the snake is relatively abundant in secondary forests and gardens, especially in locations where trees and bushes grow over rivers and streams. The presence of juveniles in these habitats suggests successful breeding in disturbed areas, though it is also possible that the snakes are taking refuge in the remaining patches of relatively undisturbed riverine habitats that border cultivated land.

The dog-toothed cat snake has been reported to be predated on by the black spitting cobra (Naja sumatrana).

Boiga cynodon is occasionally killed by vehicles, as evidenced by reports of roadkill incidents. It has also been recorded being sold in some online groups in the Philippines.

== Geographic range ==
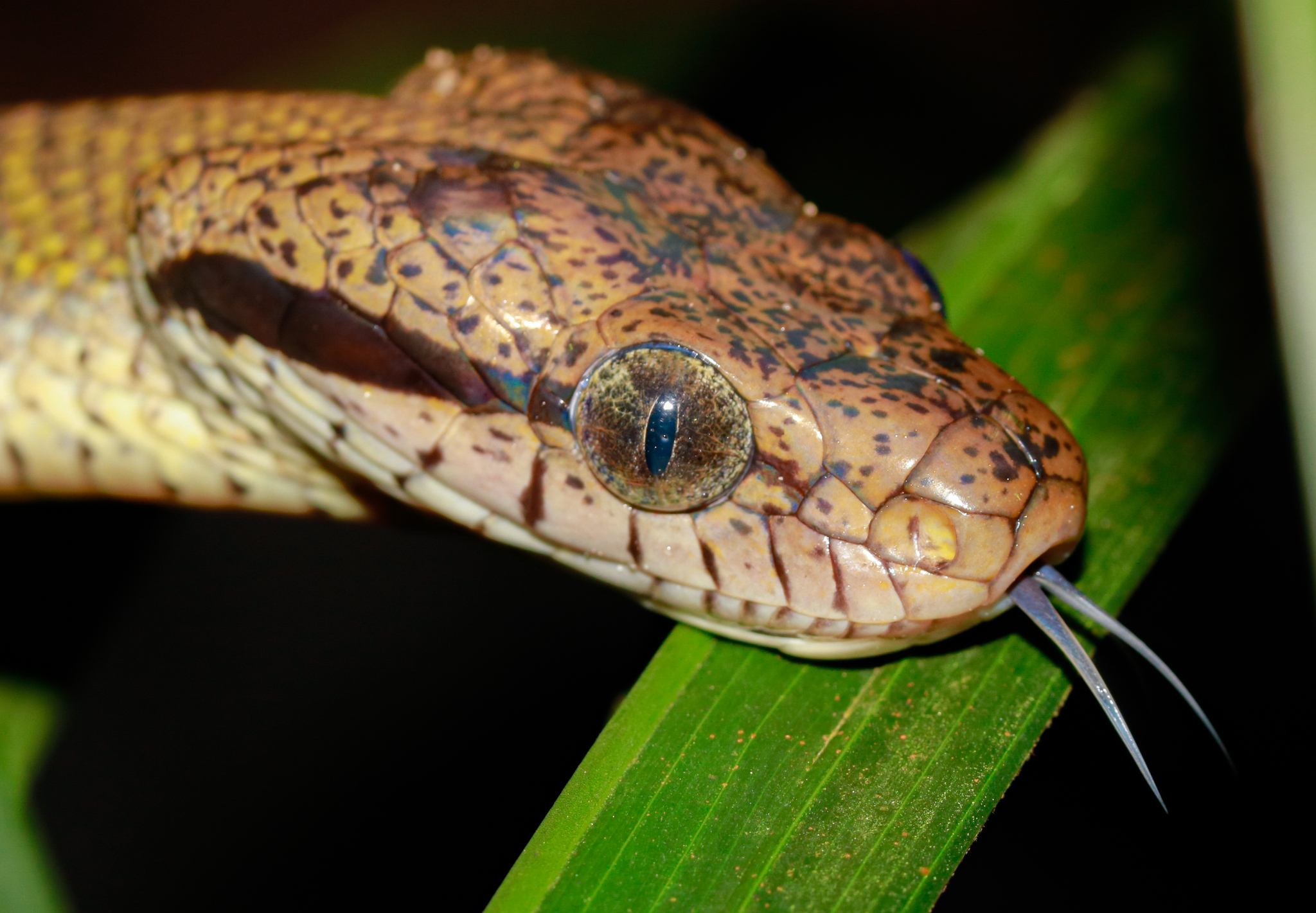
A dog-toothed cat snake in Thailand.

Boiga cynodon is a widespread species in Southeast Asia, ranging from southern Thailand into Peninsular Malaysia (including Pulau Tioman) and Singapore, extending south into Indonesia as far as Bali (including the Mentawai Archipelago, Sumatra, Nias, the Riau Archipelago, and Java). It is also found on Borneo (Brunei, Kalimantan, Sabah, and Sarawak) and throughout the Philippines, including the islands of Basilan, Culion, Dinagat, Leyte, Luzon, Mindanao, Palawan, Polillo, Sibutu, Panay, Samar, and the Sulu Archipelago. Records from the Lesser Sundas east of Bali, including Sumbawa and Flores, refer to the closely related Boiga hoeseli. It is typically found from near sea level up to around 600m in the Philippines. The presence of this species in Myanmar is uncertain.

This species was assessed by IUCN on the 30th of August 2011 and listed as least concern. This is due to the fact it has a wide range, presumably large population, presence in a number of protected areas, tolerance for habitat modification, and appears to have a stable population with no known major threats.

Available data suggests the ex-situ population of the species consists of 3 males, 6 females, and 1 unsexed individual, bringing the total to 10. These individuals are held across 2 institutions that are members of Species360, located in 2 different countries. Captive individuals have been reported by Cobra Show Thailand (Surat Thani, Thailand), the Moscow Zoo breeding nursery (Sychovo, Russia) and Tula Exotarium (Tula, Russia).
