= Chalcorana parvaccola =

Conservation status
- Least Concern (IUCN 3.1)

Scientific classification
- Kingdom: Animalia
- Phylum: Chordata
- Class: Amphibia
- Order: Anura
- Family: Ranidae
- Genus: Chalcorana
- Species: C. parvaccola

Binomial name
- Chalcorana parvaccola (Inger, Stuart, and Iskandar, 2009)

Synonyms
- Rana parvaccola Inger, Stuart, and Iskandar, 2009; Hylarana parvaccola (Inger, Stuart, and Iskandar, 2009)

Species of amphibian

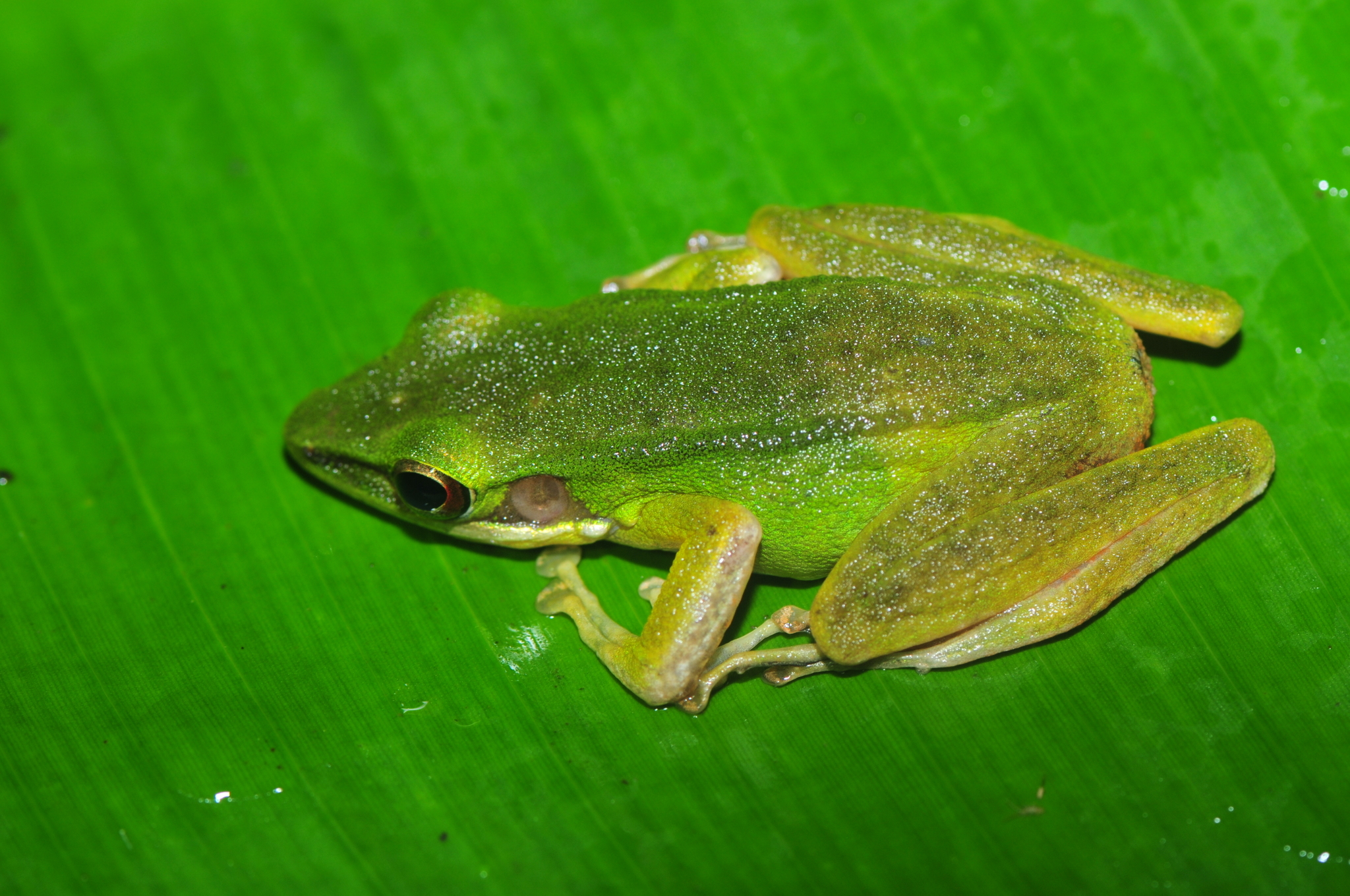

Chalcorana parvaccola is a species of "true frog" in the family Ranidae. It is endemic to Sumatra, Indonesia. It was split off from Chalcorana chalconota by Robert Inger and colleagues in 2009, along with a number of other species. The specific name parvaccola is derived from Latin parvus meaning small and accola meaning neighbor, and refers to this species being smaller than its "neighbor", the related Sumatran species Chalcorana rufipes.

== Description ==
Chalcorana parvaccola are relatively small frogs: adult males measure 28–38 mm (1.1–1.5 in) and females 38–43 mm (1.5–1.7 in) in snout–vent length. Body is slender and legs are long. The snout is narrowly rounded. The tympanum is distinct, larger in males than in females. The outer fingers have large discs; no webbing is present. The toe tips have discs that are smaller than the fingers ones. The webbing between the toes is extensive. Preserved specimens are brown dorsally and on the sides. The sides of the head are darker. The upper lip is lighter but is dusted with melanophores. There are small black spots on the dorsal surfaces. The venter is whitish and lightly dusted with melanophores. Most individuals lack dark crossbars on the hind limbs. The webbing between the toes is ventrally black.

== Habitat and conservation ==
Chalcorana parvaccola is found in both pristine and disturbed rainforests as well as in gardens and artificial ponds near villages at elevations of 31–1,539 m (102–5,049 ft) above sea level. Breeding presumably takes place in water. It is a widespread and locally common frog. It could be threatened by pollution from human settlements and by expanding oil palm plantations and human settlements. It is present in several protected areas.
