= Fauna of Borneo =

Native animals of Borneo

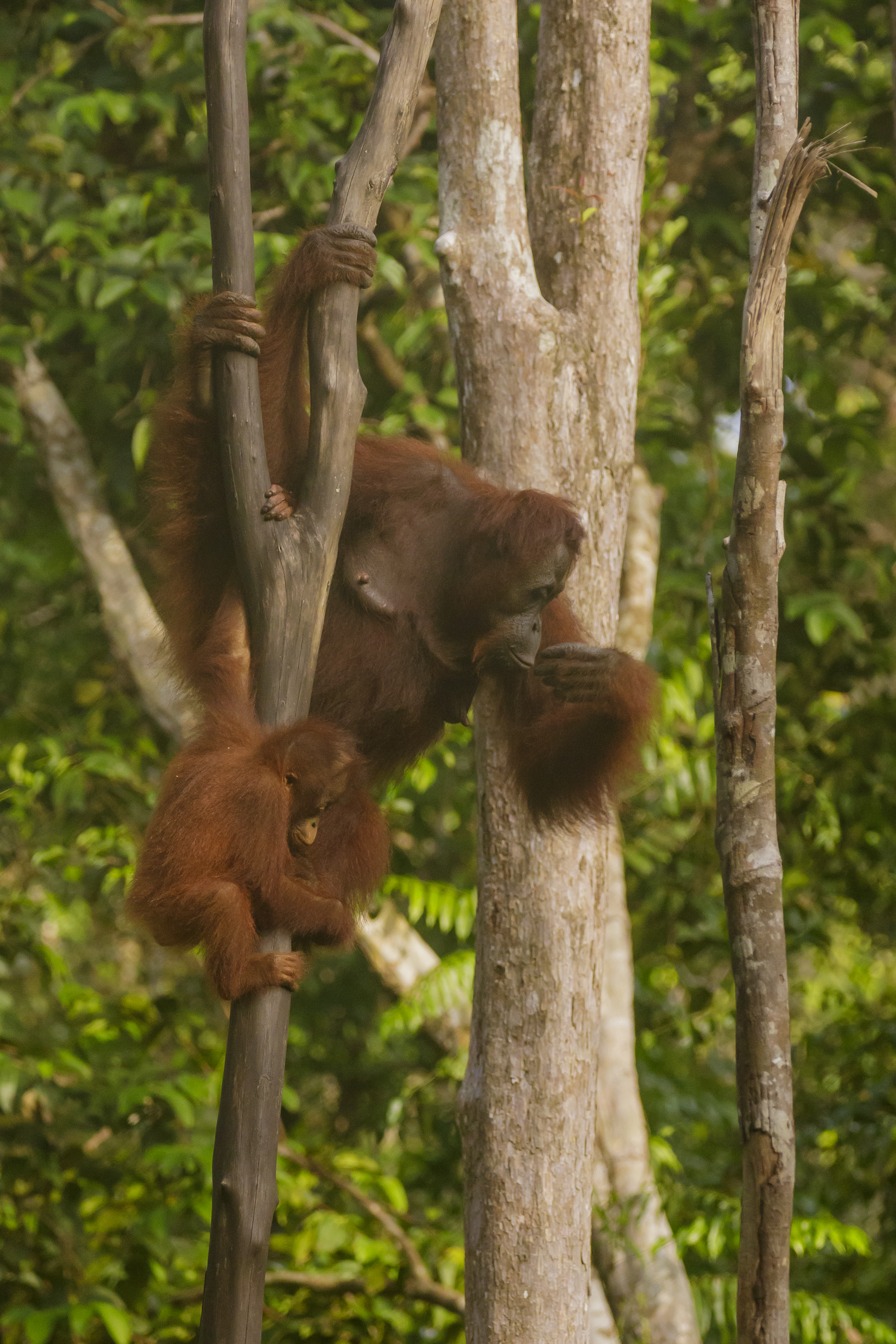
Orangutan (Pongo pygmaeus) is among the most iconic animals of Borneo and the flagship of rainforest conservation in South-East Asia.

Borneo is the third largest island in the world. In prehistoric times it was connected to the Asian mainland due to geological and climate changes. During the recent ice ages of the Pleistocene and the Holocene separation from the mainland caused extinctions and speciation of fauna on the island.

The high complexity of the Bornean tropical rain forest has created many niches that accommodate a rich diversity of fauna. Some fauna are specialised and some coexisted by having niche separation to avoid inter- and intra-specific competition within the same habitat. Ecological separation can be in the form of different feeding guilds, niche separation by stratification and different utilisation strategies by being diurnal or nocturnal. For example, vertebrate fauna (birds and mammals) can be defined into six communities based on vertical stratification of the rainforest. First, the small mammals and birds use the forest ground floor and underground. Second, the large herbivores and carnivorous animals range the ground floor of the forest searching for food, shelter and breed. Third, omnivorous and carnivorous mammals range up and down tree trunk from forest floor to the canopy level. Fourth, are mainly volant mammals such as bats and birds using the middle canopy. Fifth, are top canopy birds and mammals that feed on leaves, fruits, nectar and insects. Sixth, are the fast flying birds and bats using the above canopy area.

== Invertebrates ==
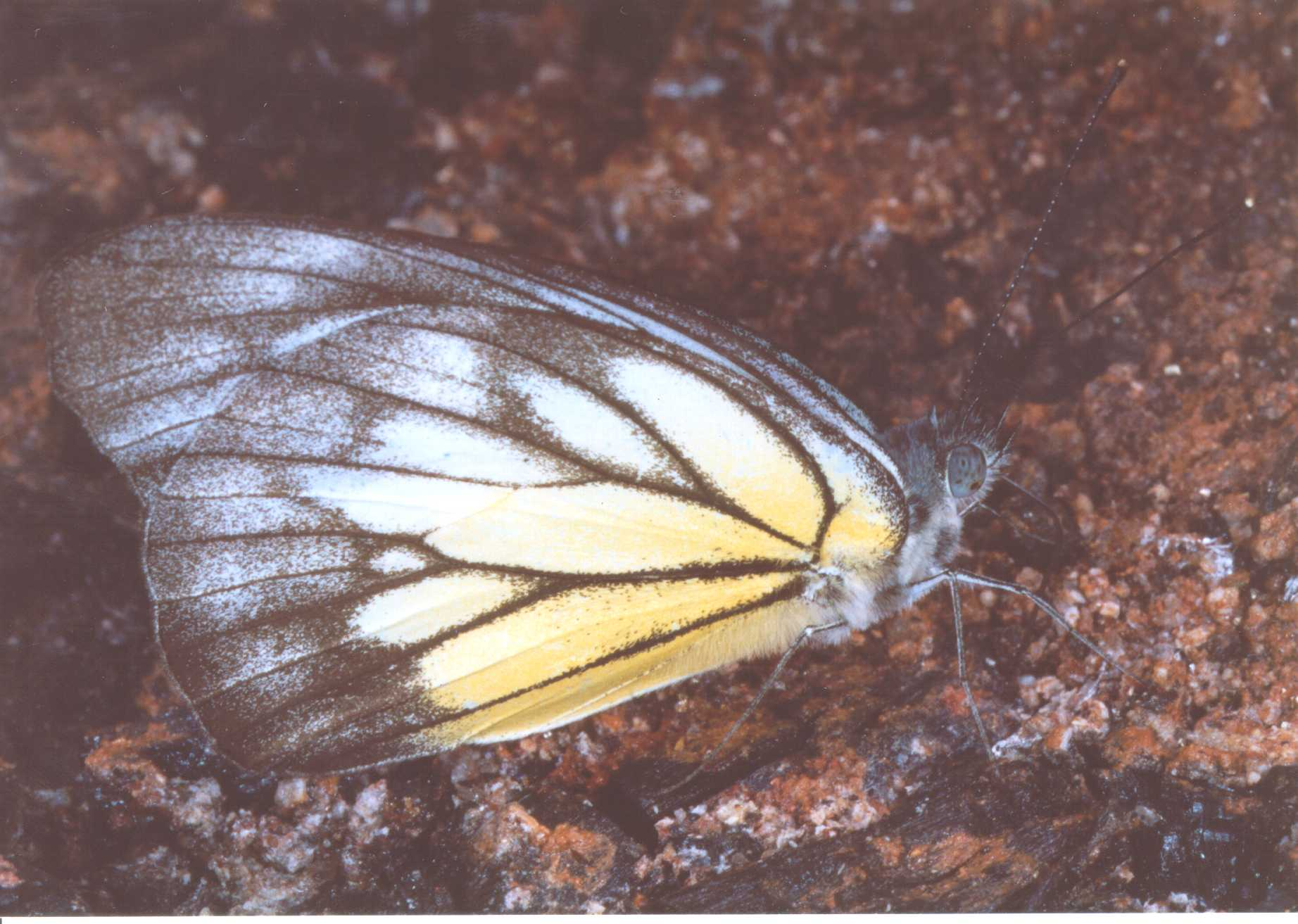
Butterfly

There are 639 species of ants, 81 genera and 8 subfamilies of the Formicidae in Poring Sabah.

== Vertebrates ==
=== Fish ===
There are 274 species of freshwater fish and 149 are endemic to Borneo.

=== Amphibians ===
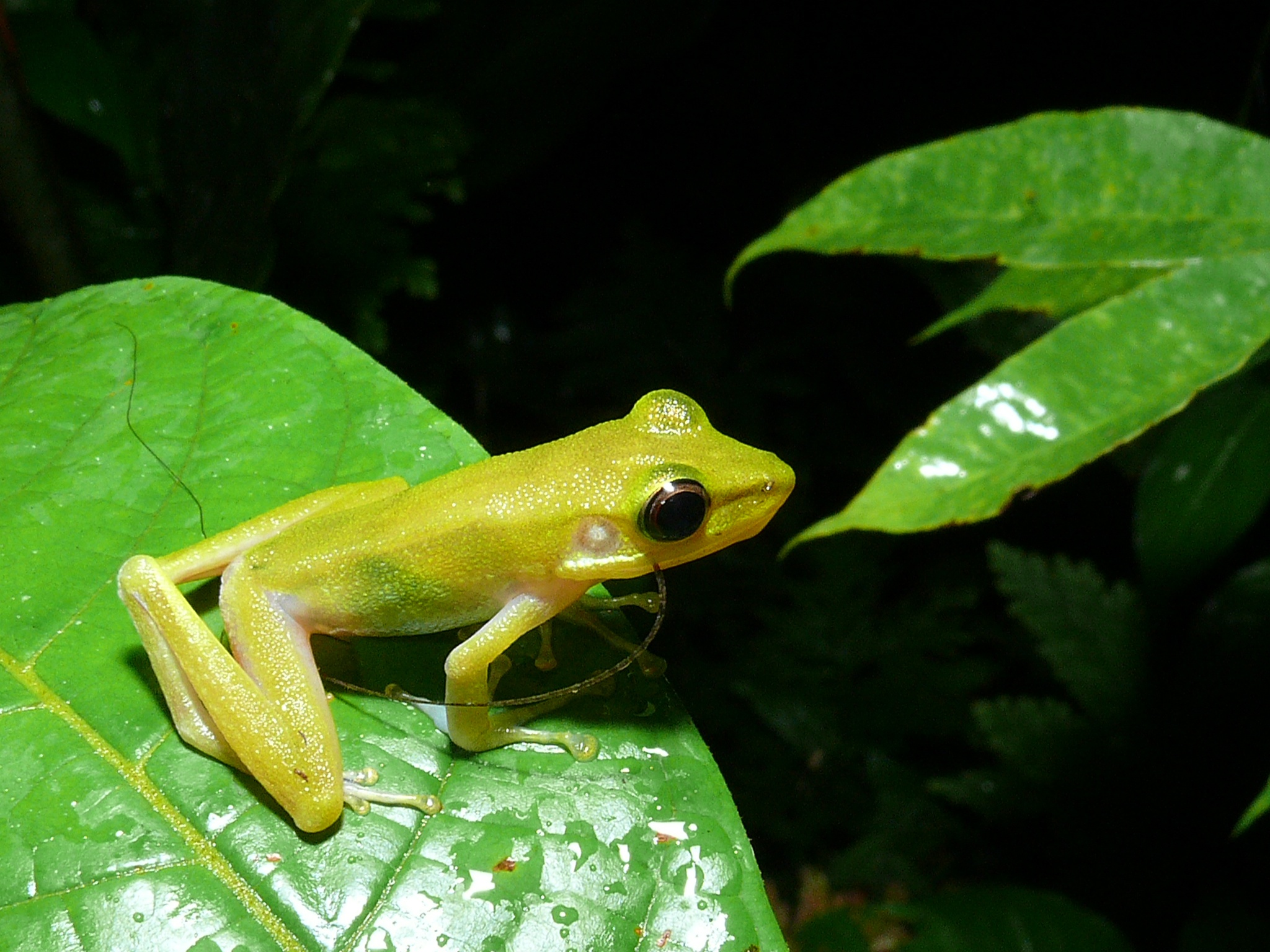
Hylarana raniceps

There are at least 180 species of amphibians.

One notable species is the Bornean flat-headed frog, Barbourula kalimantanensis. This frog, found in cold, fast-flowing mountain streams, was previously though to be the lungless, but subsequent examination revealed this was not the case.

=== Reptiles ===
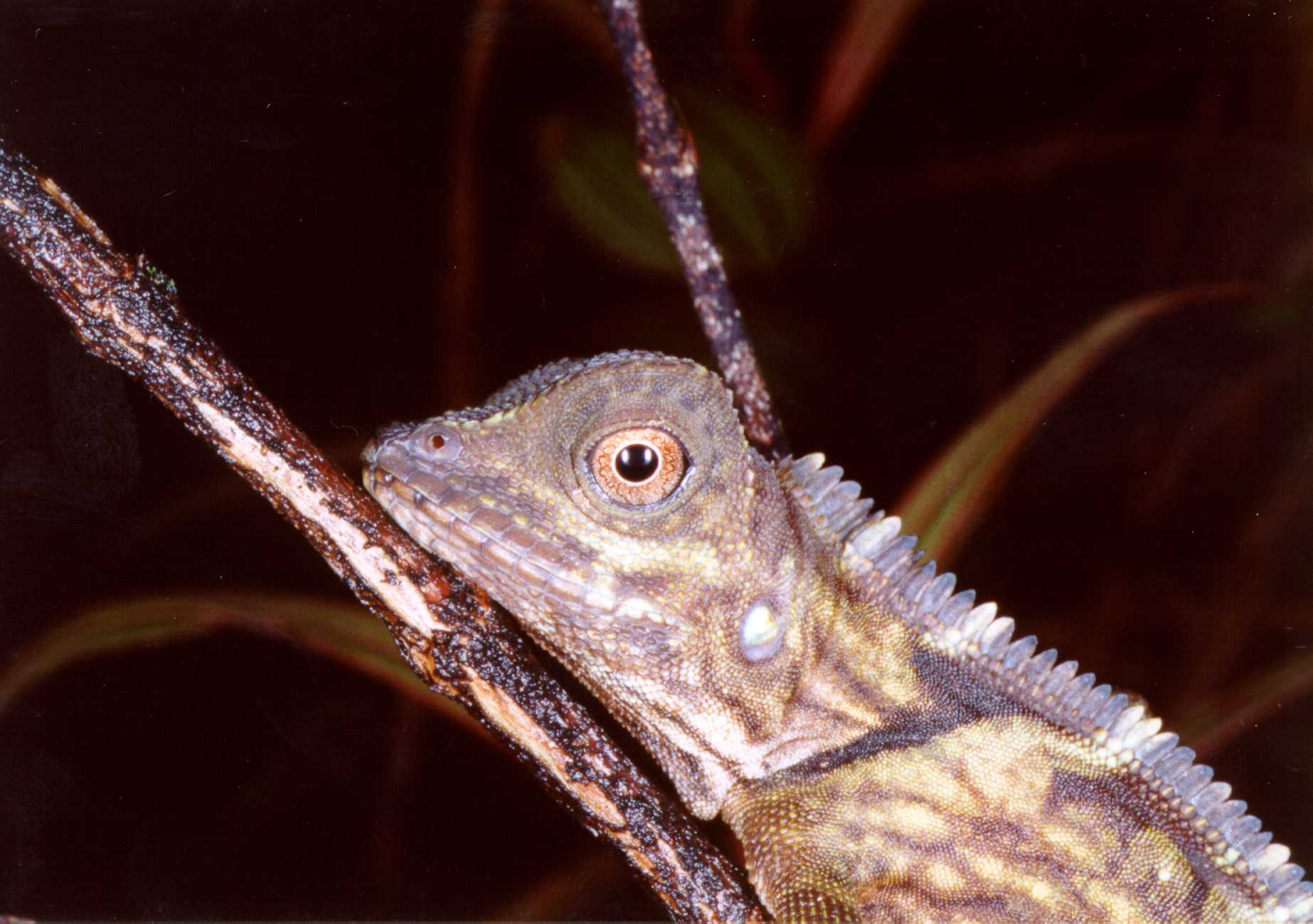
Lizard

105 species of lizards, in 35 genera from 9 families, are now known from Borneo. The reticulated python is the largest python in the world, and the longest snake in the world. This reptile can have a size of 6 metres (20 ft) or more. The longer snakes have a size of 10 metres (33 ft).

=== Birds ===
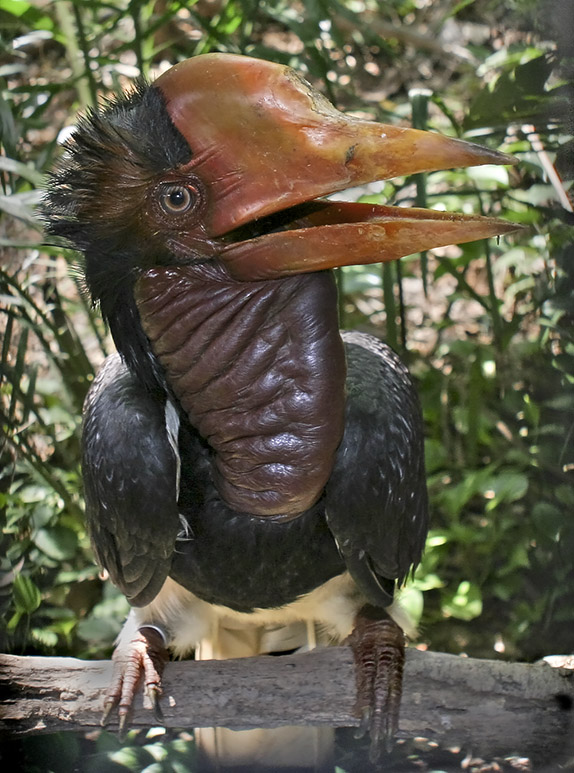
Helmeted Hornbill

Borneo has own a wide variety of bird species. The geological history of Borneo is a major factor: long isolation of the island, broken during the last Ice age, when Borneo was connected to the continent of Asia, led to a combination of Asian and native species. There are about 420 species of birds and 37 are endemic to Borneo

=== Mammals ===
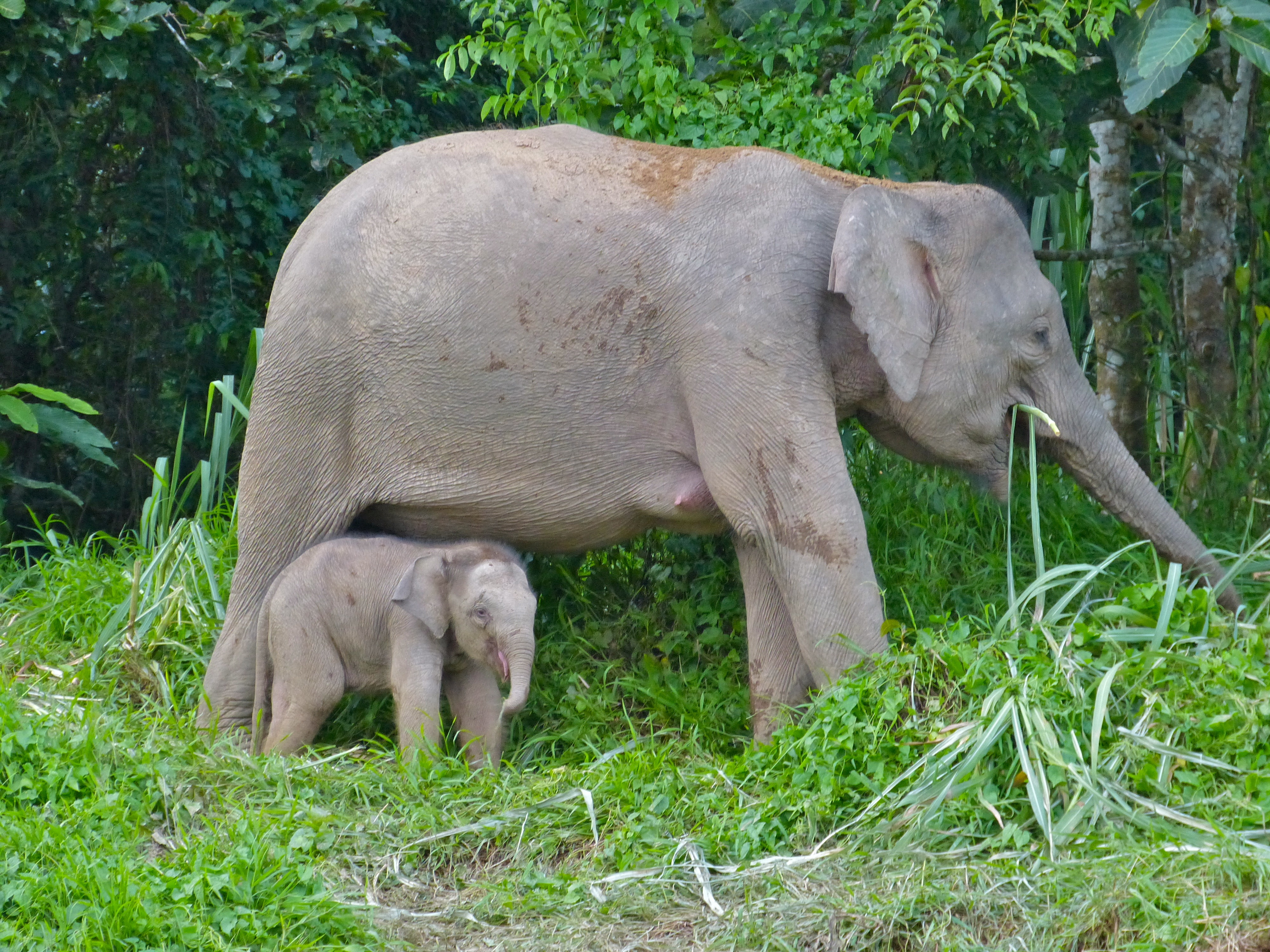
Borneo elephant is endemic for the island

The historical records of European association with Borneo and its fauna were compiled by Lord Medway that was published in 1977 by the Malaysian Branch of the Royal Asiatic Society. There are 288 species of terrestrial mammals in Borneo which is dominated by the chiroptera (102 species of bats) and rodentia (61 species of rats and mice), and 44 species are endemic to the island. There have also been 91 species of marine mammals recorded within the territorial boundaries of Malaysia, Indonesia and Brunei.

== Impact of deforestation on fauna ==
With the rapid and massive deforestation in Borneo and resulting destruction of habitats many species are endangered, such as the Bornean orangutan, or critically endangered, such as the Borneo elephant, such as the many species of birds and mammals, which are endemic for the island.

== See also ==
- Bornean tiger
- Borneo elephant
- Biodiversity of Borneo
- Flora of Borneo
- Category:Endemic fauna of Borneo
