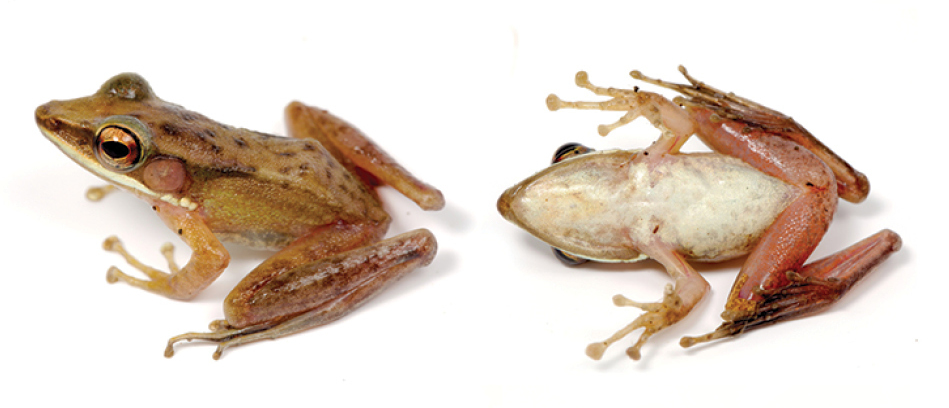

Conservation status
- Least Concern (IUCN 3.1)

Scientific classification
- Kingdom: Animalia
- Phylum: Chordata
- Class: Amphibia
- Order: Anura
- Family: Ranidae
- Genus: Chalcorana
- Species: C. megalonesa

Binomial name
- Chalcorana megalonesa (Inger, Stuart, and Iskandar, 2009)

Synonyms
- Rana megalonesa Inger, Stuart, and Iskandar, 2009; Hylarana megalonesa (Inger, Stuart, and Iskandar, 2009)

= Chalcorana megalonesa =

Species of amphibian

Chalcorana megalonesa is a species of true frog in the family Ranidae, the "true frogs". It is endemic to Borneo and is known from both Malaysia (Sarawak, Sabah) and Indonesia (Kalimantan). It was split off from Rana chalconota (now Chalcorana chalconota) in 2009 by Robert Inger and colleagues, along with a number of other species. Common name large white-lipped frog has been coined for it.

== Description ==
Chalcorana megalonesa are moderately large-sized frogs: adult males measure 33–48 mm (1.3–1.9 in) and females 45–66 mm (1.8–2.6 in) in snout–vent length. Body is moderately slender and legs are long. Dorsum is weakly granular. Colouration is mostly green. The snout is long and pointed. Finger and toe tips have adhesive disks. It is very similar to Chalcorana raniceps in colouration and general body shape but is clearly bigger in size.

== Habitat ==
Chalcorana megalonesa occurs in tropical moist lowland and swamp forest at elevations of 20–600 m (66–1,969 ft) above sea level. Breeding takes place in small, permanent ponds (usually >30 cm deep). It can also be found in oil palm and forest concessions and appears to tolerate habitat disturbance. However, the use of pesticides and herbicides on palm oil plantations is a threat to it. It occurs in a number of protected areas.
