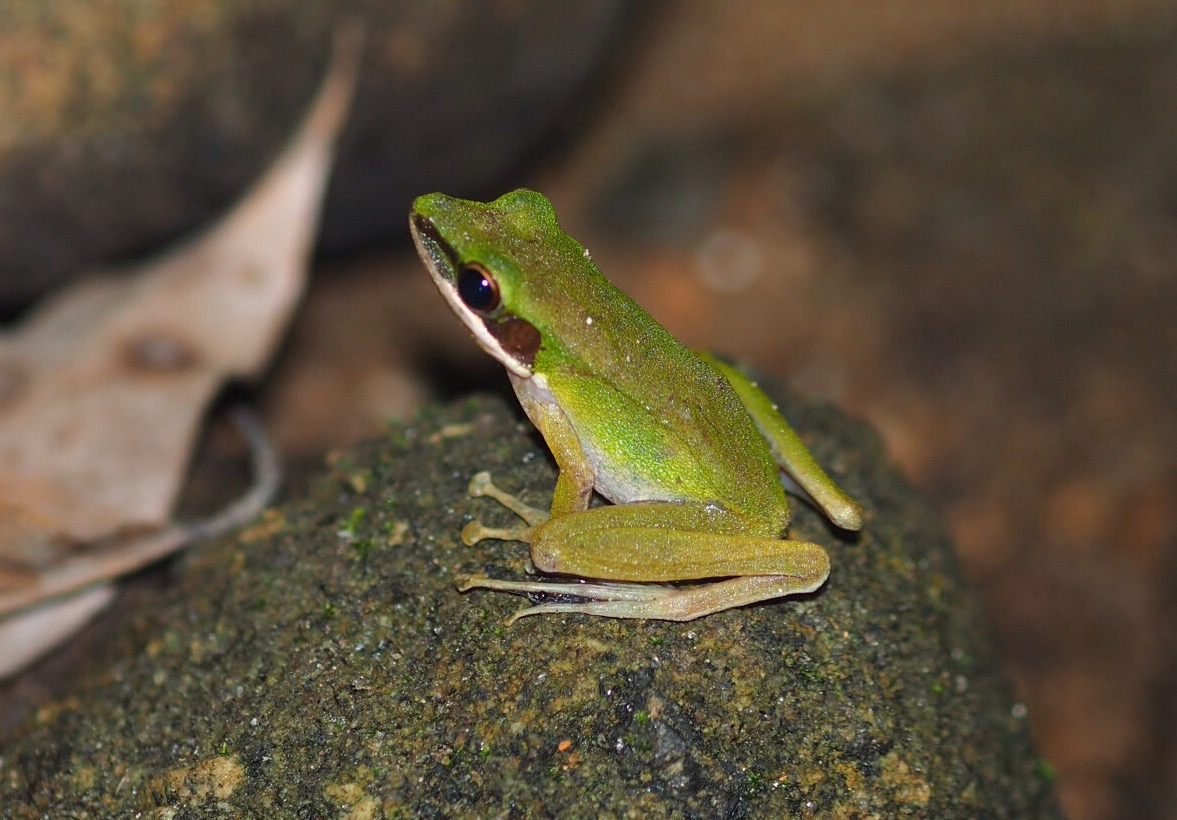

Scientific classification
- Kingdom: Animalia
- Phylum: Chordata
- Class: Amphibia
- Order: Anura
- Family: Ranidae
- Genus: Chalcorana
- Species: C. eschatia

Binomial name
- Chalcorana eschatia (Inger, Stuart, and Iskandar, 2009)

Synonyms
- Rana eschatia Inger, Stuart, and Iskandar, 2009; Hylarana eschatia (Inger, Stuart, and Iskandar, 2009)

= Chalcorana eschatia =

Species of amphibian

Chalcorana eschatia is a species of "true frog" in the family Ranidae. It is known from southern Thailand, but is likely to be more widespread. It was split off from Chalcorana chalconota (then Rana chalconota) by Robert Inger and colleagues in 2009, along with a number of other species in so-called "Rana chalconota group". The specific name eschatia, derived from the Greek word for "outskirt", refers to distribution of this species being at the edge of the geographical range of the group.

== Description ==
Chalcorana eschatia are moderate-sized frogs: adult males measure 31–40 mm (1.2–1.6 in) and females 43–57 mm (1.7–2.2 in) in snout–vent length. Body is slender and legs are long. The snout is obtusely pointed, but rounded in profile. The tympanum is distinct, slightly larger in males than in females. The outer fingers have large discs; no webbing is present but the middle fingers have sin folds. The toe tips have discs that are smaller than the fingers ones. The webbing between the toes is extensive. Dorsal skin is granular. Preserved specimens are dark brown dorsally and on the sides; no black spots are present. The venter is whitish or cream-colored, sometimes with round dark spots on the throat. Crossbars on the hind limbs are lacking.

== Habitat and conservation ==
No specific ecological information accompanied the species description, but it was noted that this species (along other related species) appears to be restricted to perhumid forests.

As of early 2019, this species has not been assessed for the IUCN Red List of Threatened Species. The entire type series was collected in a number of national parks: Ngao Falls National Park (the type locality), Khao Luang National Park, Khao Phanom Bencha National Park, Khao Sok National Park, and Kaeng Krung National Park.
