= Chalcorana mocquardi =

Conservation status
- Least Concern (IUCN 3.1)

Scientific classification
- Kingdom: Animalia
- Phylum: Chordata
- Class: Amphibia
- Order: Anura
- Family: Ranidae
- Genus: Chalcorana
- Species: C. mocquardi

Binomial name
- Chalcorana mocquardi (Werner, 1901)

Synonyms
- Rana Mocquardii Werner, 1901; Hylarana macquardii (Werner, 1901)

Species of amphibian

Chalcorana mocquardi is a species of "true frogs" in the family Ranidae. It is endemic to Sulawesi, Indonesia, including some offshore islands. It is probably similar in its ecological requirements to Chalcorana chalconota and is associated with small lowland forest streams. It occurs in both primary and degraded forests, provided that a reasonably closed canopy remains. Adults disperse more widely in the forest, whereas the tadpoles live in side pools and slow-flowing, deeper sections of the streams. No significant threats to this species are known.
