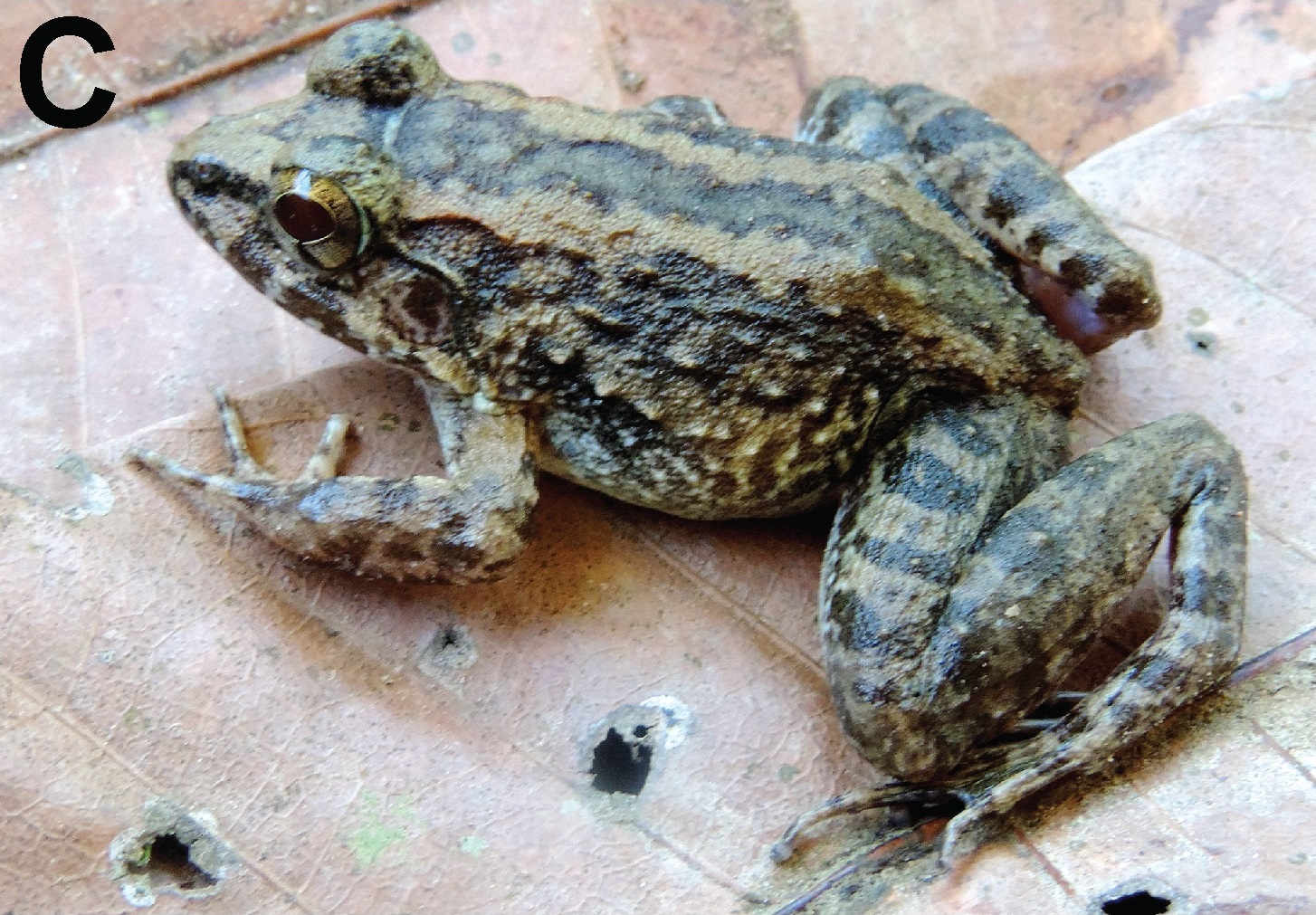

Scientific classification
- Kingdom: Animalia
- Phylum: Chordata
- Class: Amphibia
- Order: Anura
- Family: Dicroglossidae
- Genus: Limnonectes
- Species: L. larvaepartus

Binomial name
- Limnonectes larvaepartus Iskandar, Evans, and McGuire, 2014

Synonyms
- Limnonectes larviparus Inger & Voris, 2001; Limnonectes "ovovivipar" Iskandar & Tjan, 1996

= Limnonectes larvaepartus =

Species of amphibian

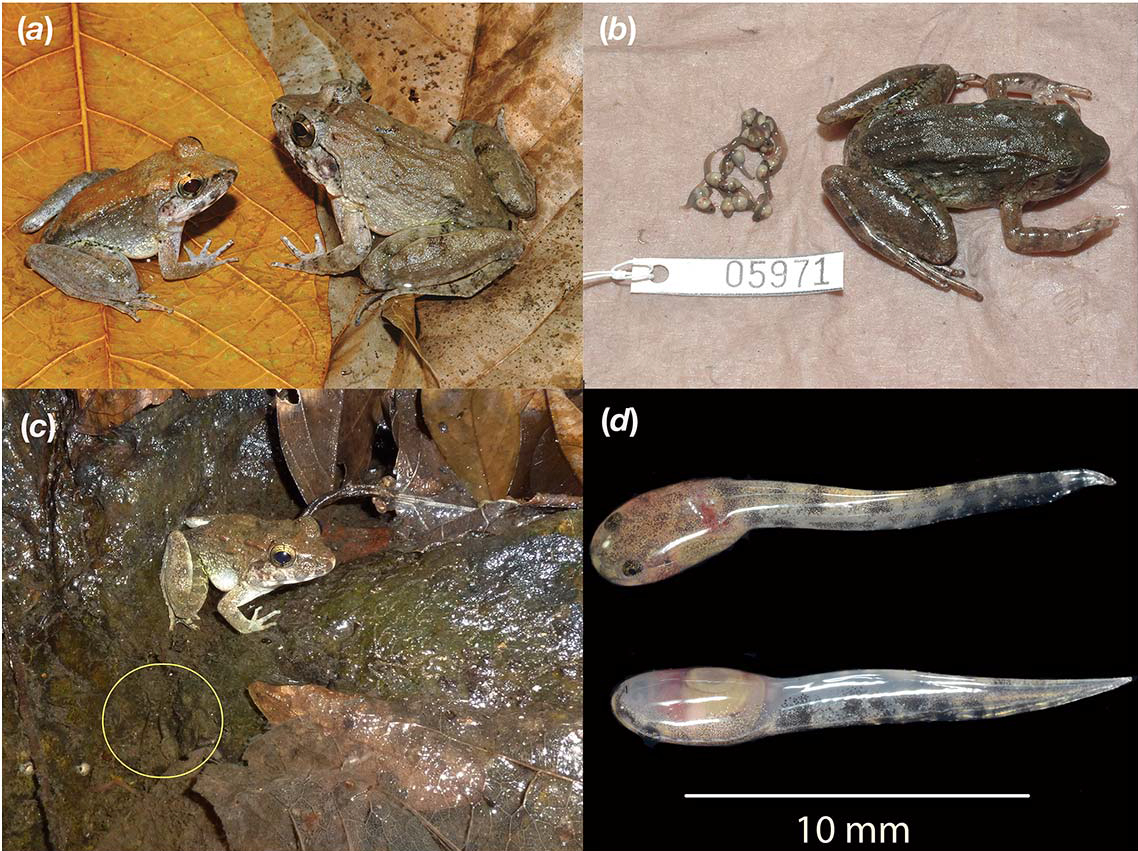
(a) Male (left) and female from Sulawesi; (b) Female with tadpoles removed from the oviduct. (c) Adult male calling by a stream; two tadpoles visible within the circle; (d) dorsal and ventral views of tadpoles released by a female at the moment of capture

Limnonectes larvaepartus is a species of fanged frog in the family Dicroglossidae endemic to northern and western Sulawesi, Indonesia. It is unique in that it has internal fertilization and gives live birth to tadpoles. Other frog species that have live birth produce froglets.

== Discovery ==
The frog was first mentioned in 1994 under the nomen nudum "Limnonectes ovovivipar", which refers to ovovivipary, whereby the tadpoles hatch from their eggs while still inside their mother. In 2014, it was formally named and described by Djoko Iskandar, Ben Evans, and Jim McGuire. Its specific name is derived from larvae + Latin partus (give birth). The authors collected over 100 specimens for their study and witnessed either direct birth of tadpoles or tadpoles in the oviducts on 19 occasions. They also observed free-living tadpoles in stream-side puddles.

In 2015, the International Institute for Species Exploration names it as one of the "Top 10 New Species" for new species discovered in 2014.

== Characteristics ==
The average male size (from tip of snout to cloaca) is 37.4 millimetres (1 15/32 inches), while the average female size is 40.2 mm (1 19/32 in). Within Sulawesi, it has been found in the Northern Peninsula and on the western edge of the central core. The dorsum is typically brownish-grey, but can also be reddish-brown or golden-tan. The underside may be yellowish or cream, with a dark spot often marking the upper end of the tibia.

Females produce approximately 100 eggs, which hatch as tadpoles in the oviducts and are probably retained there until exhausting their supply of yolk. Apart from yolk, the oviductal tadpoles may also feed on feces and dead siblings. The tadpoles are born into slow-moving streams. They feature well-developed tails, mouthparts and pigmentation at birth. After birth, tadpoles likely self-feed even before metamorphosis into froglets. The oviducts have no obvious specializations to accommodate the tadpoles, raising the possibility that the unique breeding mode is the result of a simple behavioral change in fertilization method. It is not known how internal fertilization occurs, as the male frog has no obvious intromittent organ.
