= Limnonectes sisikdagu =

Scientific classification
- Kingdom: Animalia
- Phylum: Chordata
- Class: Amphibia
- Order: Anura
- Family: Dicroglossidae
- Genus: Limnonectes
- Species: L. sisikdagu

Binomial name
- Limnonectes sisikdagu McLeod, Horner, Husted, Barley & Iskandar, 2011

Species of amphibian

Limnonectes sisikdagu is a species of fanged frogs in the family Dicroglossidae. It is endemic to West Sumatra, Indonesia, where its holotype was found near Solok. It is part of the Limnonectes kuhlii species complex.
