= Biodiversity of Borneo =

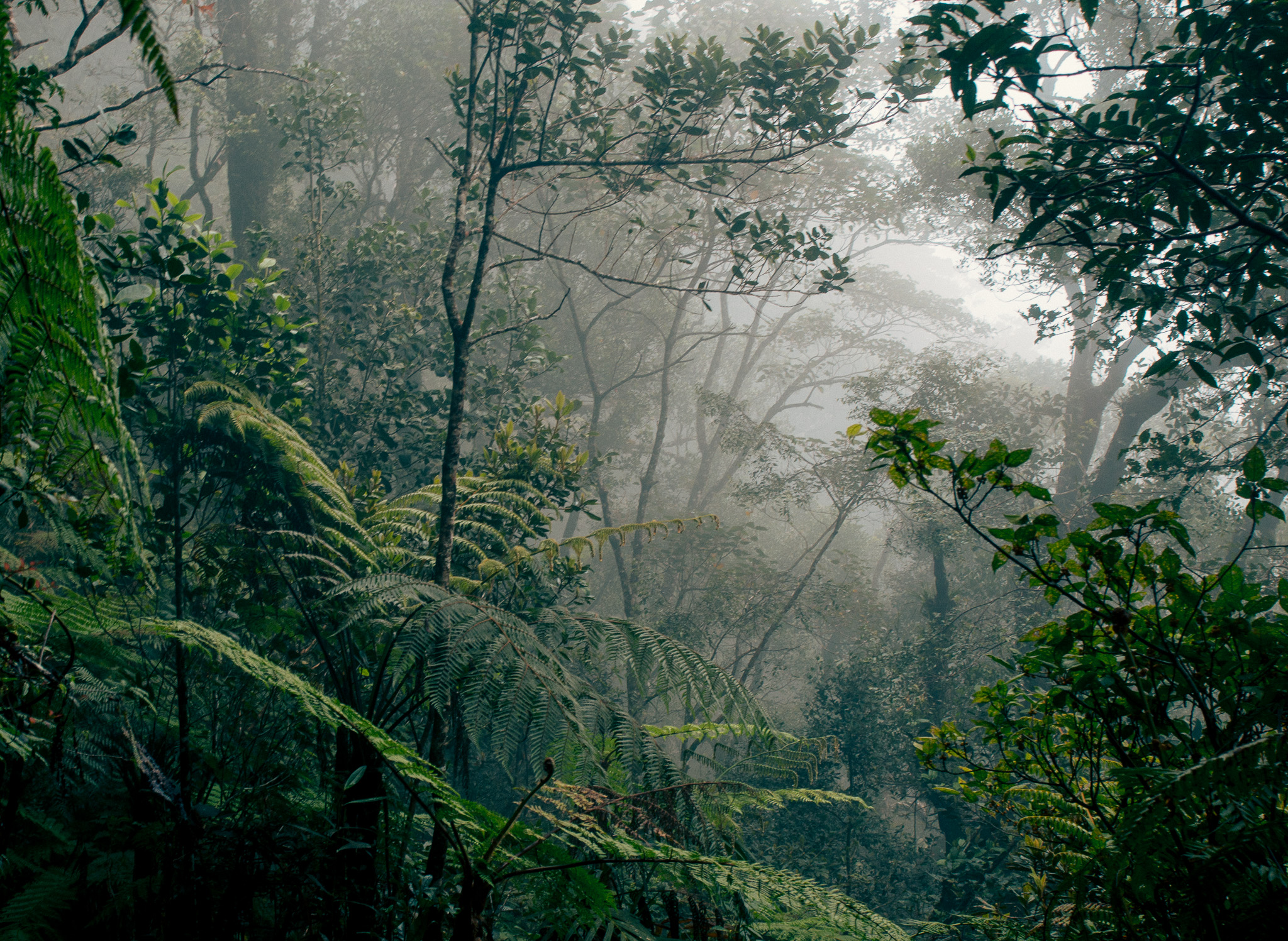
Rainforest in Kinabalu Park, Borneo. The biodiversity on the island of Borneo consists of 15,000 plant species, with more than 1,400 amphibians, birds, fish, mammals, reptiles and insects.

The island of Borneo is located on the Sunda Shelf, which is an extensive region in Southeast Asia of immense importance in terms of biodiversity, biogeography and phylogeography of fauna and flora that had attracted Alfred Russel Wallace and other biologists from all over the world.

The previous climatic oscillation and sea level changes leading to contraction and expansion of the tropical rain contributed to the extinction and genetic divergence of species in the region. Harrison (1958) was the first to discover intermittent human habitation about 49,000 years ago in the Niah Cave National Park. Baker et al.(2007) unravelled the complexities of the late Pleistocene to Holocene habitation of the Niah Cave.

Flenley (1998) and Bird et al. (2005) suggested of a continuous savanna habitat with from the Asian mainland into Borneo and interrupted by a network of ancient Sunda River system. Dodson et al. (1995) postulated that the biogeographical history of Southeast Asia contributed to extensive admixture during Pleistocene low sea levels of genetic groups of an obligate freshwater fish (the river catfish, Hemibagrus nemurus) isolated during periods of high sea levels. During Pleistocene glacial maxima, the sea level was lower than at present and the islands of the Sunda shelf (Sumatra, Borneo and Java) and the Asian mainland were connected by lowlands traversed by rivers. Thus, the fish from Baram, Endau and Mekong rivers were genetically related.

Piper et al. (2008) identified 27 mammal, 11 bird and eight reptile taxa recovered from the Terminal Pleistocene deposits at Niah Cave. Some of these animals are extinct and extent in distribution in Borneo. Other biologists suggested Pleistocene refugia found in Borneo to explain for the gene flow and genetic divergent of certain species.

== Biodiversity factors in Borneo and extinction ==
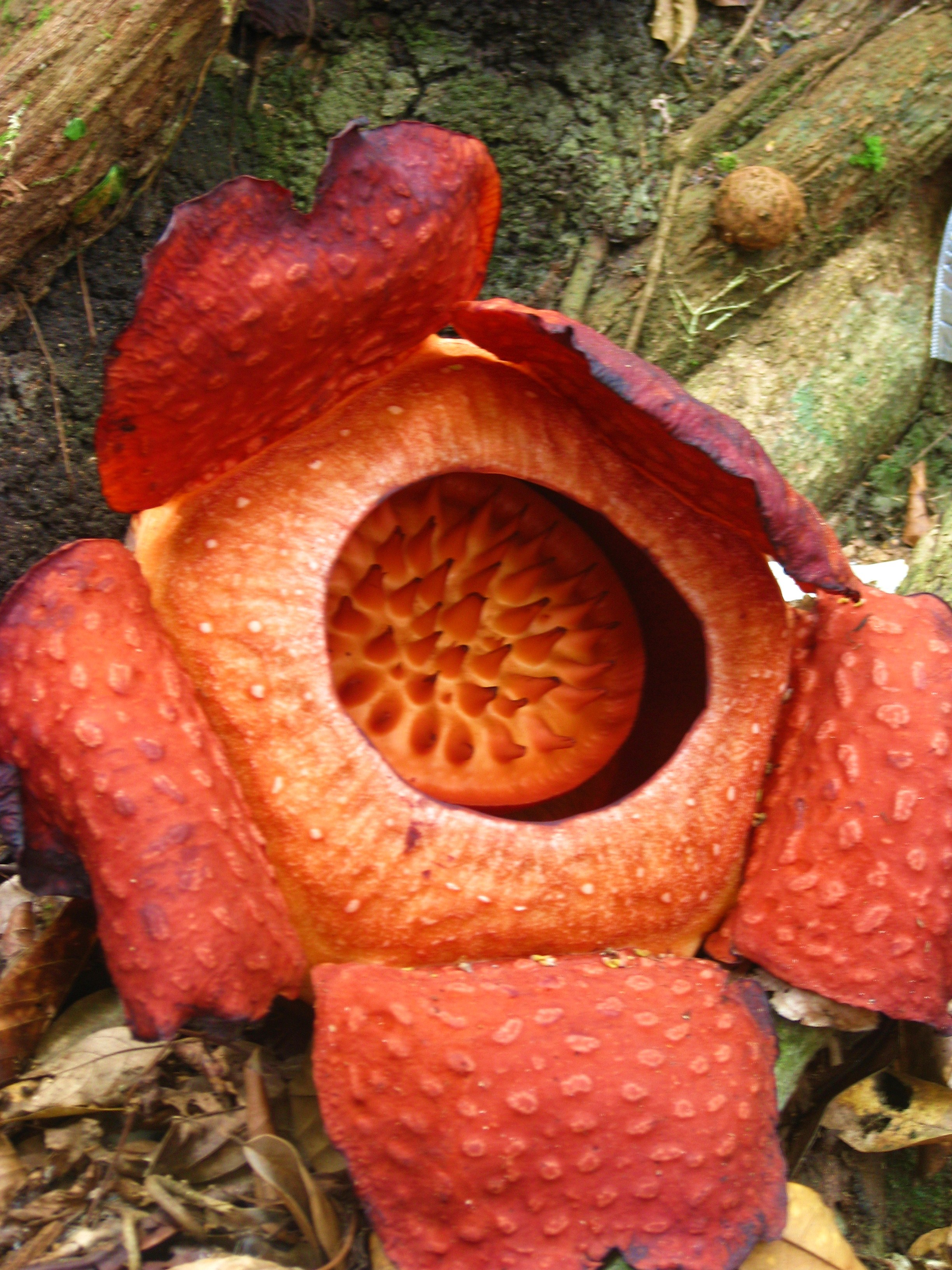
Rafflesia, largest flower in the world is endemic to Borneo

Borneo, made up of three countries - Malaysia (Sabah and Sarawak), Brunei (Sultanate) and Indonesia (Kalimantan), is the third largest island in the world. Borneo is a region that is rich in biodiversity. It is home to approximately 15,000 plant species, and more than 1,400 amphibians, birds, fish, mammals, reptiles and insects. The largest flower in the world, the Rafflesia, can be found in Borneo. The island covers an area of 743,330 square kilometres (287,000 sq mi) and has a wide range of biomes. A biome refers to a major ecological community characterized by dominant vegetation and organisms adapted to a particular environment. Borneo forests are some of the most biodiverse ecosystems on the planet due to their ideal tropical climate. Some of the forests in Borneo are tropical rainforests, mangrove swamp forests, peat swamp forests, montane forests, heath forests and dipterocarp forests. These physically diverse habitats provide different conditions for different organisms to live. Therefore, the biodiversity is increasing as the organisms have found their own favorite habitat to live. For example, the Orangutan exists naturally only on the islands of Borneo and Sumatra because it depends heavily on forest ecosystems for food and shelter.

High biodiversity is more likely to develop under relatively stable environmental conditions with moderate levels of disturbance. Stable conditions allow species to reproduce and adapt successfully. Although major natural disasters can cause widespread extinction, small or moderate disturbances may sometimes increase biodiversity by creating new ecological niches. For instance, small-scale forest clearing by farmers for plantations can alter habitats and encourage the growth of different plant and animal communities.

Evidence of past glacial activity has also been found on Mount Kinabalu, suggesting that snow and ice once existed even in this equatorial region during the Last Glacial Maximum (LGM). During this period, global temperatures were estimated to be 4–7°C lower than they are today. The cooler climate caused ice and snow to accumulate on mountains, disrupting the hydrological cycle and lowering sea levels by approximately 120 metres. As sea levels dropped, shallow seabeds became exposed, forming land bridges that connected Peninsular Malaysia, Borneo, Sumatra, Java, and Bali into a single large landmass. These geological changes altered wind patterns, sea currents, and the distribution of species, isolating populations in forest refuges and contributing further to the evolution and diversification of species in the region.

It is unknown if the Bornean tiger became extinct in recent times or prehistoric times.

== See also ==
- Fauna of Borneo
- Flora of Borneo
- Category:Endemic fauna of Borneo
- Category:Endemic flora of Borneo

== Bibliography ==
- Glacial phenomena on Mount Kinabalu, Sabah. BN Koopmans, PH Stauffer - Borneo Region, Malaysia Geological Survey Bulletin, 1968.
- Elevational diversity patterns of small mammals on Mount Kinabalu, Sabah, Malaysia. SMD Nor - Global Ecology and Biogeography, 2001
- Riverine effects on mitochondrial structure of Bornean orang-utans (Pongo pygmaeus) at two spatial scales. MF Jalil, J Cable, J Sinyor, I Lackman- … - Molecular
- Late Quaternary glaciation and periglacial phenomena in Australia and New GuineaRW Galloway, GS Hope, E Löffler, JA Peterson - Palaeoecology of Africa and of the …, 1973
- The Birds of Mt Kinabalu and their Zoogeographical Relationships. BE Smythies - Proceedings of the Royal Society of London. Series B, …, 1964
- The effect of climatic change on southeast Asian geomorphology. HT Verstappen - Journal of Quaternary Science, 1997.
- Interstadial records of the last glacial period at Pantai Remis, Malaysia. B Kamaludin, BY Azmi - Journal of Quaternary Science, 1997 - interscience.wiley.com
- An altitudinal transect study of the vegetation on Mount Kinabalu, Borneo by Kitayama
- Kishen Bunya (presenter), Titol Peter Malim, Wahap Marni, Huzal Irwan Hussin, Khairul Nizam Kamaruddin, Mohd Nizam Mat Saad, M.T. Abdullah. 2011. A Brief Survey of Mammals in Imbak Canyon Conservation Area, Sabah. Seminar on Imbak Canyon Scientific Expedition 14–15 March 2011 Promenade Hotel, Kota Kinabalu, Sabah.
- Abdullah, M.T., Wong, S.F, and Besar Ketol. 2010. Catalogue of mammals of UNIMAS Zoological Museum, Universiti Malaysia Sarawak Publication, Kota Samarahan.
- Abdullah MT, NH Hasan, FAA Khan, JJ Rovie-Ryan, JV Kumaran, Y Esa, IV Paul, and LS Hall. 2009. Review on the molecular phylogeny of selected Malaysian Bats. pp28–33. In G Ainsworth and S Garnett (eds). RIMBA: Sustainable forest livelihoods in Malaysia and Australia, Universiti Kebangsaan Malaysia, Universiti Malaysia Sarawak and Charles Darwin University.
- CBD. http://www.cbd.int/convention/text/
- www.cbd.int/incentives/doc/biodiv-economic-value-en.pdf
- CIA Fact 2011.
- Clements, R., Rayan, D.M., Abdul Wahab Ahmad Zafir, Venkataraman, A., Alfred, R, Payne, J., Ambu, L., Sharm, D.S.K. 2010. Trio under threat: can we secure the future of rhinos, elephants and tigers in Malaysia? Biodiversity Conservation. DOI 10.1007/s10531-009-9775-3. On-line Springer.
- Costanza, R. d’Arge, R. de Groot, S. Farberk, M. Grasso, B. Hannon, K. Limburg, S. Naeem, R. V. O’Neill, J. Paruelo, R. G. Raskin, P. Suttonkk and M. van den Belt. 1997. The value of the world’s ecosystem services and natural capital. Nature, 387: 253-260.
- Dasmann, R. F. 1968. A Different Kind of Country. MacMillan Company, New York. ISBN 0-02-072810-7.
- Erwin TL. 1983. Tropical forest canopies, the last biotic frontier. Bulletin of the Entomological Society of America 29: 14–19.
- Khan, M.K.M, Abdullah, M.T, Rahman, M.A., Nor, B.M. 1992. IS TRANSLOCATION A MANAGEMENT TOOL? Gajah 9: 15-18.
- Koh, L.P., Ghazoul, J., Butler, R.A., Laurance, W.F., Sodhi, N.S., Mateo-Vega, J., Bradshaw, C.J.A. 2010. Wash and spin cycle threats to tropical biodiversity. Biotropica 42(1): 67-71.
- Latiff, A., A. H. Zakri. 2000. Protection of Traditional Knowledge, Innovations and Practices: The Malaysian Experience. UNCTAD Expert Meeting on Systems and National Experiences for Protecting Traditional Knowledge, Innovations and Practices.
