= Draco iskandari =

Conservation status
- Least Concern (IUCN 3.1)

Scientific classification
- Kingdom: Animalia
- Phylum: Chordata
- Class: Reptilia
- Order: Squamata
- Suborder: Iguania
- Family: Agamidae
- Genus: Draco
- Species: D. iskandari

Binomial name
- Draco iskandari McGuire, Brown, Mumpuni, Riyanto & Andayani, 2007
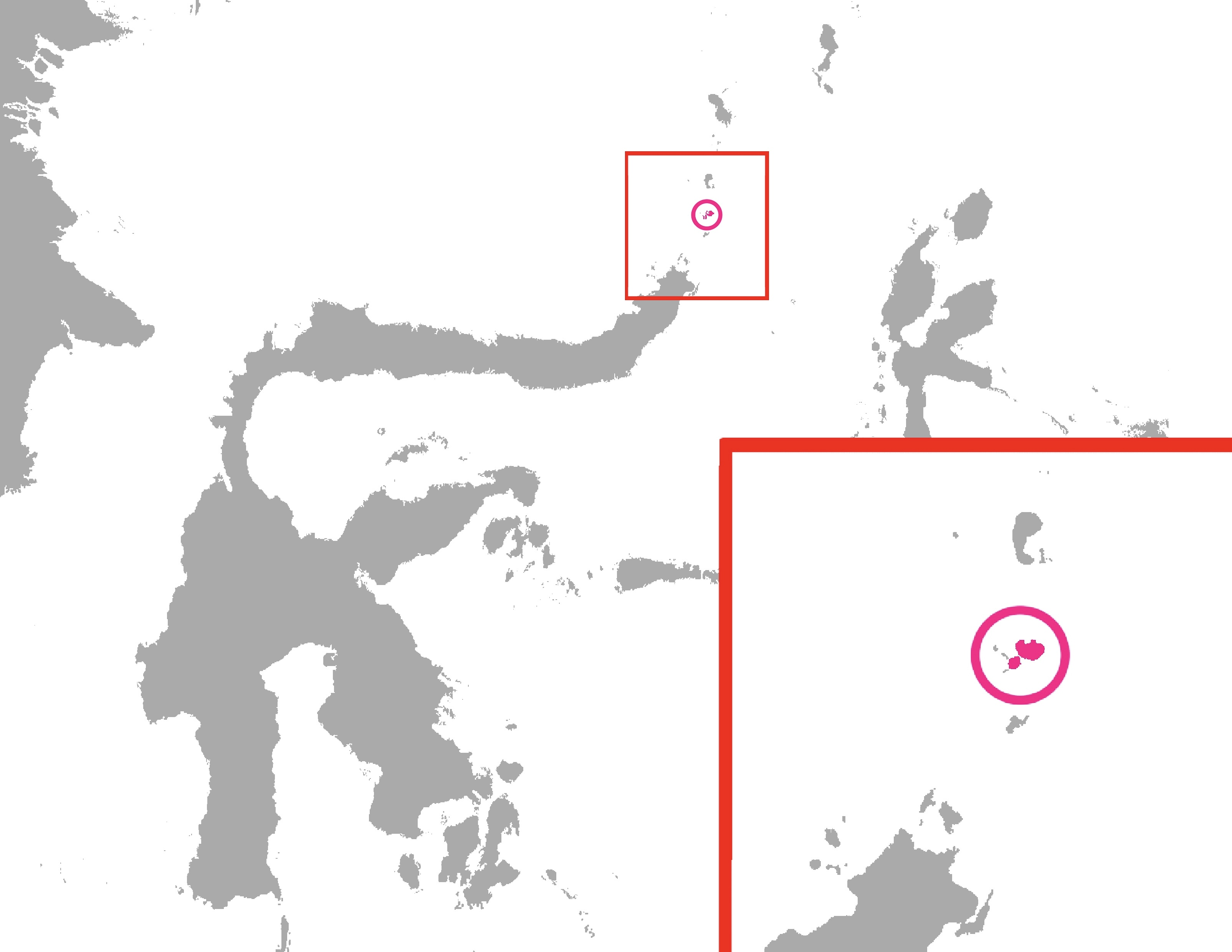

Species of lizard

Draco iskandari is a species of lizard in the family Agamidae. The species is endemic to Indonesia.

== Etymology ==
The specific name, iskandari, is in honor of Indonesian herpetologist Djoko Tjahono Iskandar.

== Geographic range ==
D. iskandari is found on the island of Tagulandang, one of the Sangihe Islands off the northern tip of Sulawesi, Indonesia.

== Habitat ==
The preferred natural habitat of D. iskandari is forest, but it has also been found in artificial habitats such orchards and plantations.

== Behavior ==
D. iskandari is arboreal and diurnal.

== Reproduction ==
D. iskandari is oviparous.
