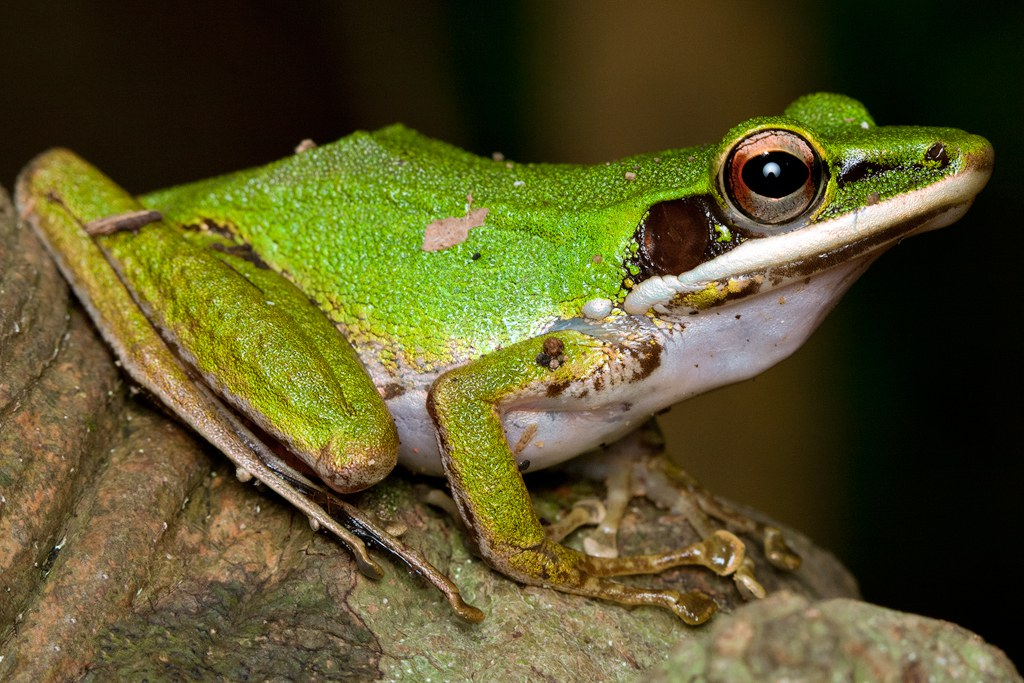
- Chalcorana raniceps

Scientific classification
- Kingdom: Animalia
- Phylum: Chordata
- Class: Amphibia
- Order: Anura
- Family: Ranidae
- Genus: Chalcorana; Dubois, 1992

Type species
- Hyla chalconota Schlegel, 1837

Species
- 10 species (see text)

= Chalcorana =

Genus of amphibians

Chalcorana is a genus of frogs in the family Ranidae, "true frogs". They are found in Southeast Asia, from Thailand to Malay Peninsula and the Sunda Islands.

== Taxonomy ==
Chalcorana was originally introduced as a subgenus of Rana. It was often included in the then-diverse genus Hylarana, until Oliver and colleagues revised the genus in 2015, delimiting Hylarana more narrowly and elevating Chalcorana to genus rank.

== Description ==
Chalcorana are small to medium-sized frogs with a long head and bullet-shaped body. The upper lip is usually white. The limbs and the body are gracile. There are many accessory body glands. The dorsum is shagreened and with fine mottling. There may be small, round glands which may be tipped with spicules. The dorsolateral folds are thin or consist of a line of warts. The diagnostic characters of Chalcorana are the first finger being no longer than the second one, large finger discs (at least twice the finger width), and humeral gland that is 1/3–1/2 of the length of the upper arm.

== Species ==
There are 10 species:

- Chalcorana chalconota (Schlegel, 1837)
- Chalcorana eschatia (Inger, Stuart, and Iskandar, 2009)
- Chalcorana labialis (Boulenger, 1887)
- Chalcorana macrops (Boulenger, 1897)
- Chalcorana megalonesa (Inger, Stuart, and Iskandar, 2009)
- Chalcorana mocquardi (Werner, 1901)
- Chalcorana parvaccola (Inger, Stuart, and Iskandar, 2009)
- Chalcorana raniceps (Peters, 1871)
- Chalcorana rufipes (Inger, Stuart, and Iskandar, 2009)
- Chalcorana scutigera (Andersson, 1916)

The AmphibiaWeb lists also Chalcorana kampeni, which the Amphibian Species of the World considers a synonym of Sumaterana crassiovis.
