= Batik bent-toed gecko =

Scientific classification
- Kingdom: Animalia
- Phylum: Chordata
- Class: Reptilia
- Order: Squamata
- Suborder: Gekkota
- Family: Gekkonidae
- Genus: Cyrtodactylus
- Species: C. batik

Binomial name
- Cyrtodactylus batik Iskandar, Rachmansah & Umilaela, 2011

Species of lizard

The Batik bent-toed gecko (Cyrtodactylus batik) is a species of gecko endemic to Sulawesi.
