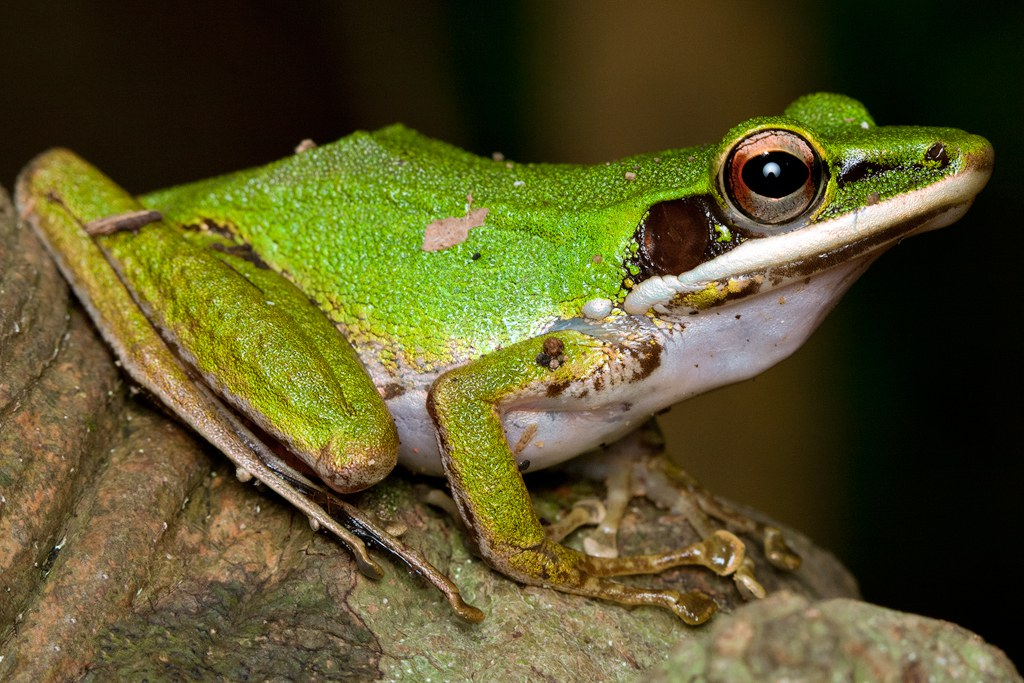

Conservation status
- Least Concern (IUCN 3.1)

Scientific classification
- Kingdom: Animalia
- Phylum: Chordata
- Class: Amphibia
- Order: Anura
- Family: Ranidae
- Genus: Chalcorana
- Species: C. raniceps

Binomial name
- Chalcorana raniceps (Peters, 1871)

Synonyms
- Polypedates raniceps Peters, 1871; Rana raniceps (Peters, 1871); Hylarana raniceps (Peters, 1871)

= Chalcorana raniceps =

Species of amphibian

Chalcorana raniceps, also known as the copper-cheeked frog, white-lipped frog, or Peters' Malaysian frog, is a species of "true frog" in the family Ranidae. It is endemic to Borneo, including Brunei Darussalam, Kalimantan (Indonesia), Sabah and Sarawak (Malaysia), although it is likely to occur more widely. Previously mixed with Chalcorana chalconota (treated as a junior synonym or a subspecies) and believed to have much wider distribution, its range was delimited to Borneo in the revision of "Rana chalconota" complex by Robert Inger and colleagues in 2009.

== Description ==
Chalcorana raniceps are relatively small frogs: adult males measure 28–34 mm (1.1–1.3 in) and females 33–42 mm (1.3–1.7 in) in snout–vent length. Colouration is mostly green, sometimes with brown back. The snout is long and pointed. Finger and toe tips have adhesive disks. The thighs may be reddish undersides. It resembles Chalcorana megalonesa but is much smaller. Tadpoles are conspicuous with dark markings and red gills on light brown to yellow background; presumably, they are poisonous.

== Habitat ==
Chalcorana raniceps inhabits a broad range of lowland primary and secondary rainforest habitats. It breeds in ponds, intermittent streams, and quiet side pools of streams. Males call in small groups from twigs and vegetation 0.5–1.5 m above the ground.
