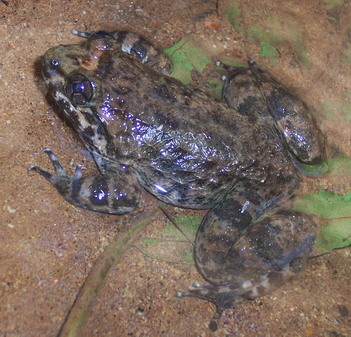

Conservation status
- Least Concern (IUCN 3.1)

Scientific classification
- Kingdom: Animalia
- Phylum: Chordata
- Class: Amphibia
- Order: Anura
- Family: Dicroglossidae
- Genus: Limnonectes
- Species: L. kuhlii

Binomial name
- Limnonectes kuhlii (Tschudi, 1838)

Synonyms
- Rana kuhlii Tschudi, 1838

= Kuhl's creek frog =

Species of amphibian

Kuhl's creek frog or large-headed frog (Limnonectes kuhlii) is a species of frog in the family Dicroglossidae.

== Species complex ==
L. kuhlii was once believed to have a broad distribution in Northeast India (Assam) and Southeast Asia, but a phylogenetic analysis in 2010 demonstrated that there were at least 16 morphologically similar, but genetically distinct evolutionary lineages subsumed under the name.

Already, several populations that were previously identified as L. kuhlii have been formally described as new species: L. fujianensis and L. bannaensis of China, L. nguyenorum and L. quangninhensis of Vietnam, L. jarujini, L. taylori, L. isanensis, and L. megastomias of Thailand, and L. sisikdagu from Indonesia. The original specimen of L. kuhlii was found in Java, and that is the only area where the "true" species occurs with certainty.

== Phylogeny ==
Below is a phylogeny of species within the L. kuhlii species complex (McLeod, et al. 2015).

- - - Limnonectes kuhlii (Java)
    - Limnonectes sisikdagu
  - Limnonectes fragilis
  - - - Limnonectes bannaensis
      - - Limnonectes namiyei
        - Limnonectes fujianensis
    - - Limnonectes jarujini
      - - Limnonectes nguyenorum
        - - Limnonectes isanensis
          - Limnonectes taylori
          - Limnonectes megastomias
