= Flora of Borneo =

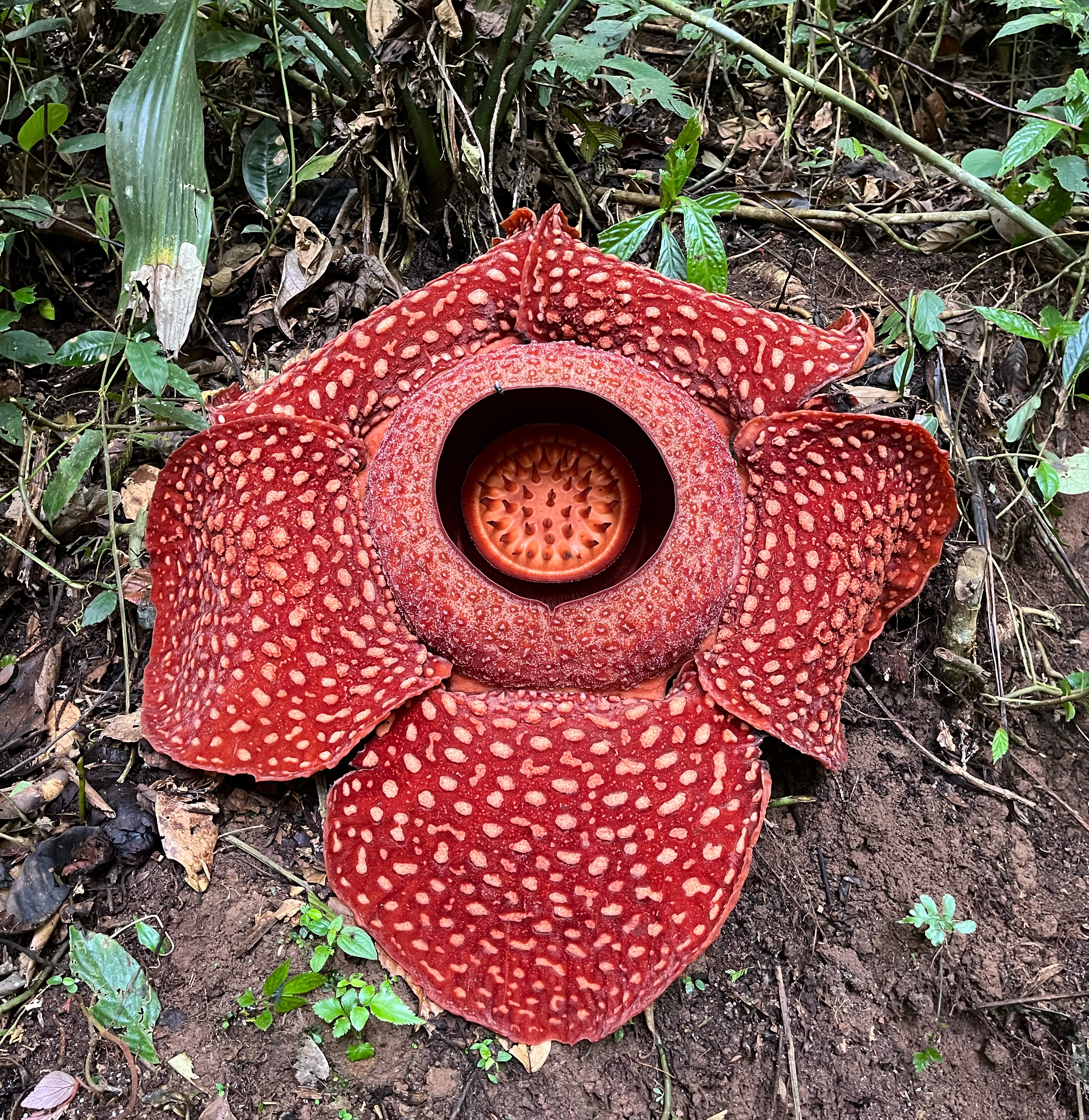
The Rafflesia arnoldii is typical plant for Borneo

The flora of Borneo include 15 species of dicot tree, 37 species of non-tree dicot and 49 species of monocot endemic to the rich forest of Brunei Darussalam. Borneo is also home to the world's largest flower, the "corpse flower" (Rafflesia arnoldii), which can reach nearly 3 feet (0.91 meters) in diameter and up to 15 pounds (6.8 kg) in weight. Borneo is the third largest island in the world and is divided between three countries: Brunei in the north, the Malaysian constituent states of Sarawak and Sabah, and the 5 Kalimantan provinces of Indonesia (note that in Indonesian, "Kalimantan" refers to the entire island of Borneo).

The tallest tropical trees of the world are in Borneo. They are in the family Dipterocarpaceae.

== See also ==
- Biodiversity of Borneo
- Fauna of Borneo
