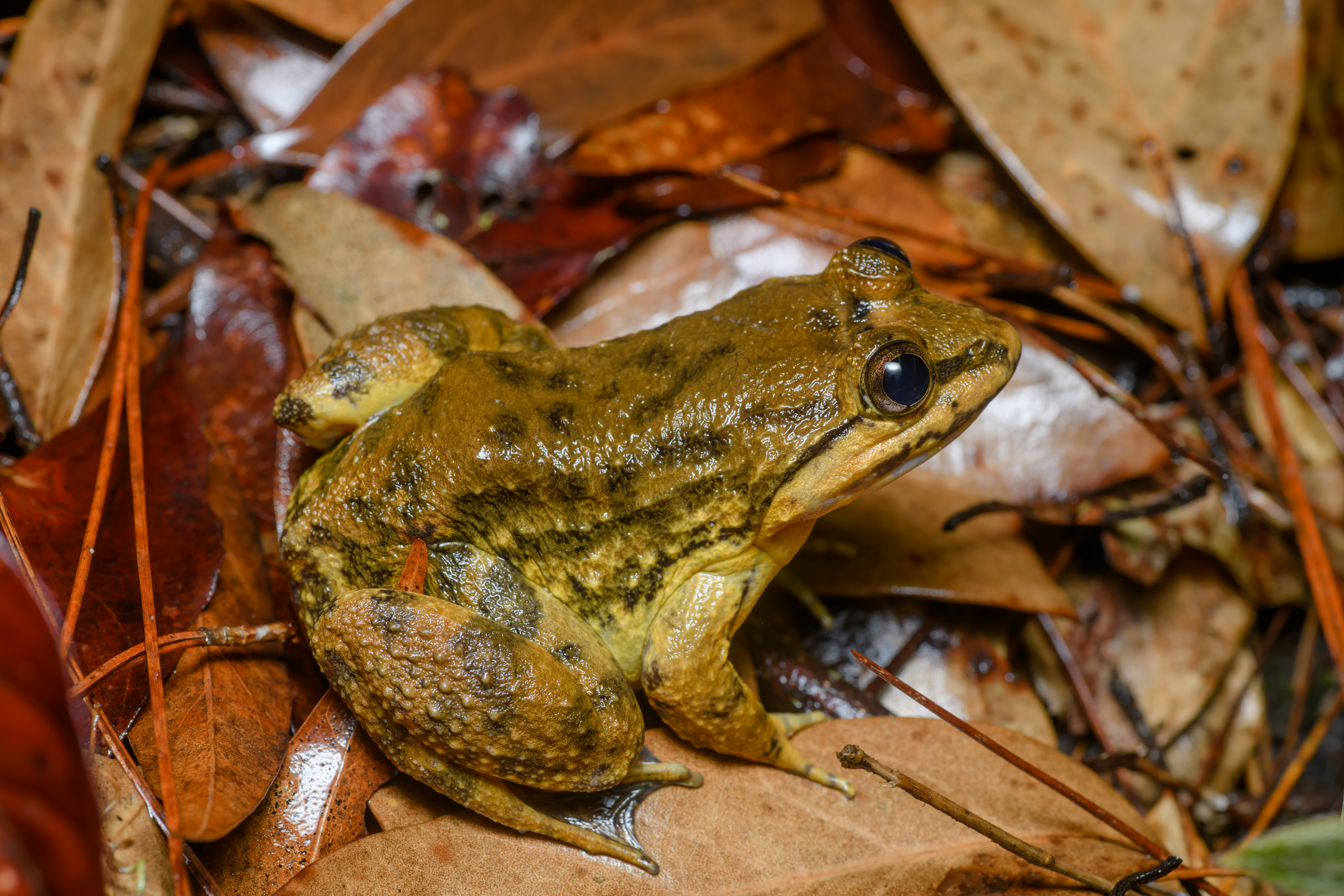
- Limnonectes isanensis - Phu Kradueng National Park

Conservation status
- Vulnerable (IUCN 3.1)

Scientific classification
- Kingdom: Animalia
- Phylum: Chordata
- Class: Amphibia
- Order: Anura
- Family: Dicroglossidae
- Genus: Limnonectes
- Species: L. isanensis

Binomial name
- Limnonectes isanensis McLeod, Kelly, and Barley, 2012

= Limnonectes isanensis =

Species of amphibian

Limnonectes isanensis is a species of fanged frogs in the family Dicroglossidae. It was discovered in Phu Luang Wildlife Sanctuary, Loei Province, Thailand in 2012. It belongs to the Limnonectes kuhlii species complex.

== Photos ==
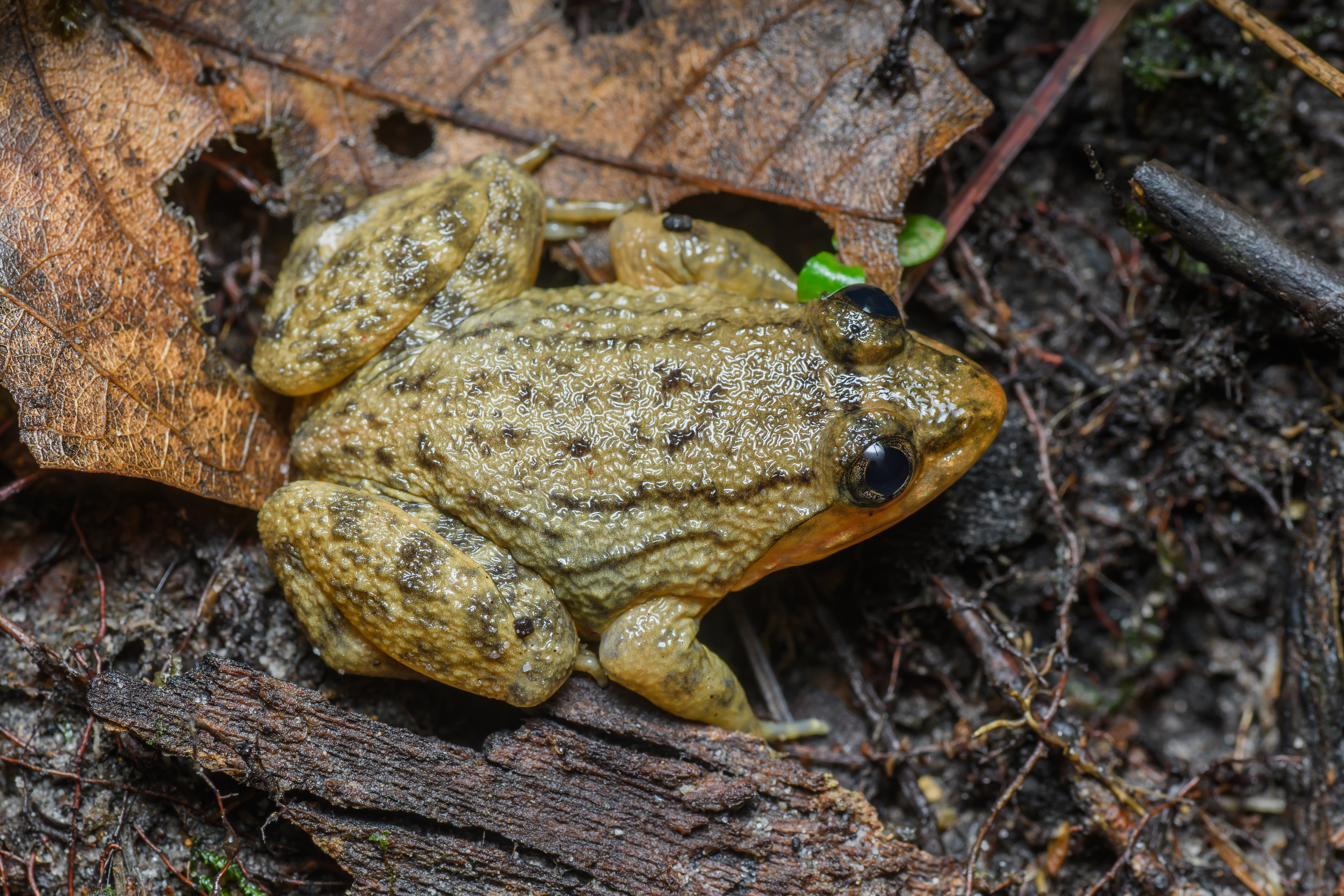
Limnonectes isanensis - Phu Kradueng National Park

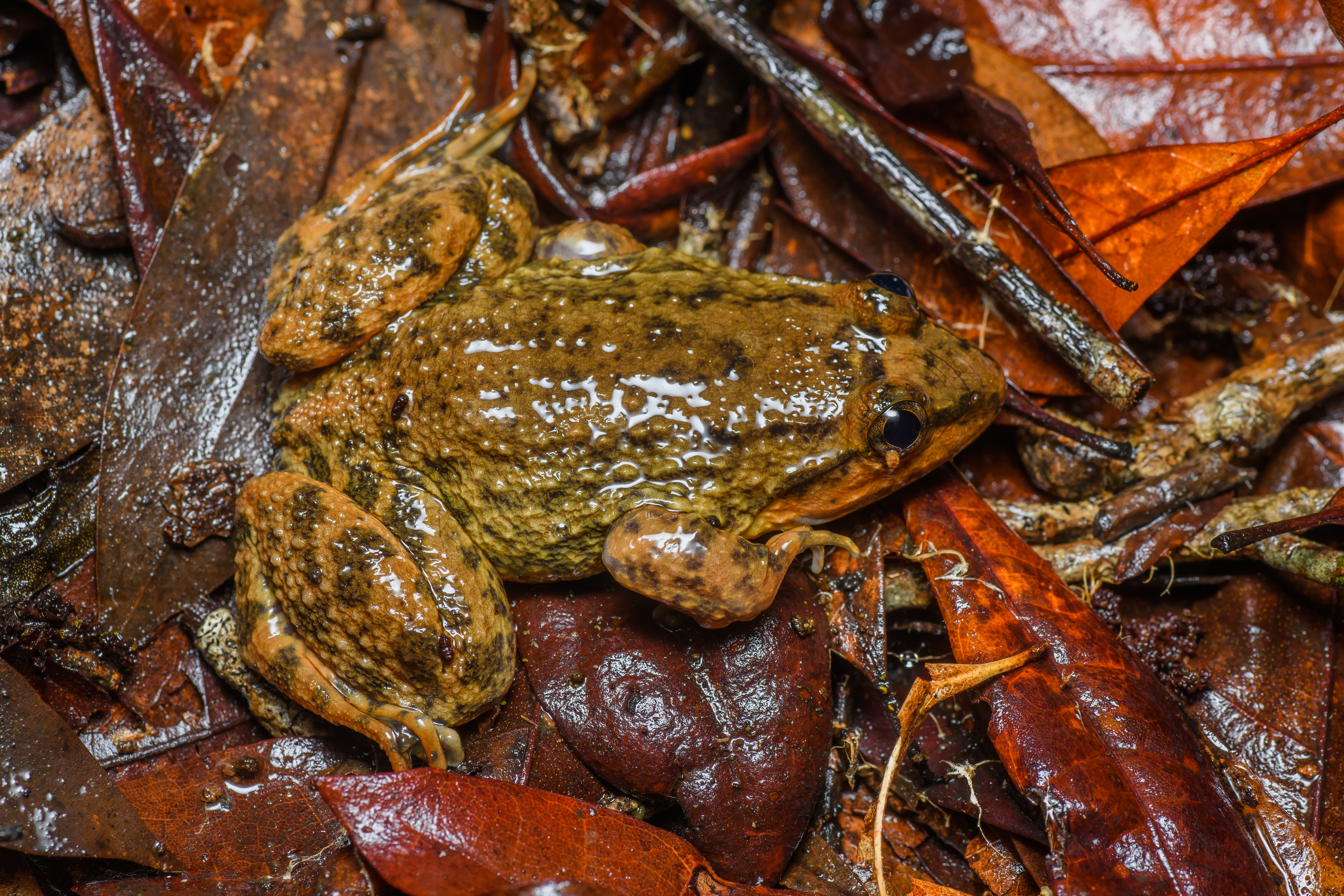
Limnonectes isanensis - Phu Kradueng National Park

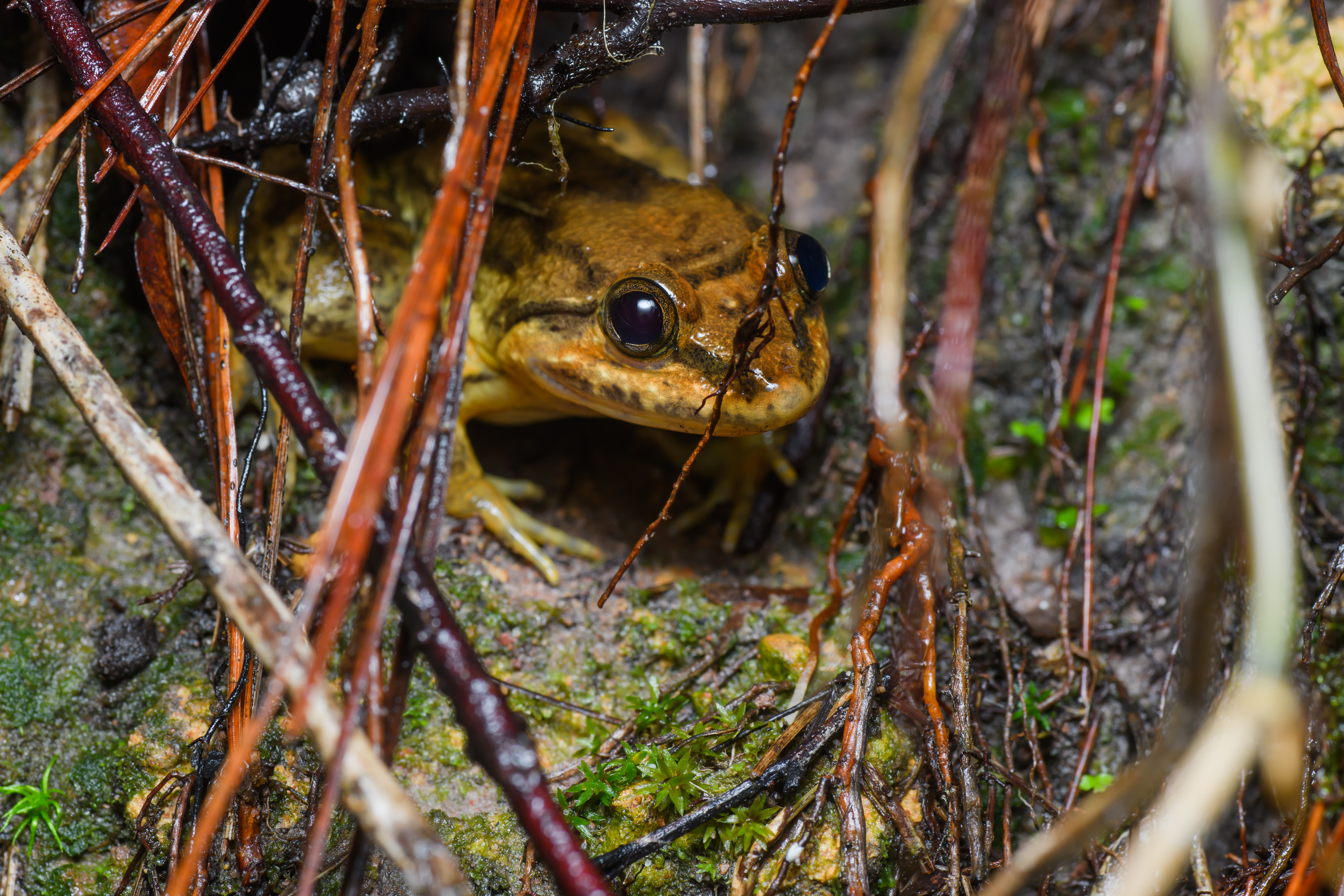
Limnonectes isanensis - Phu Kradueng National Park
