= Cyrtodactylus wallacei =

Scientific classification
- Kingdom: Animalia
- Phylum: Chordata
- Class: Reptilia
- Order: Squamata
- Suborder: Gekkota
- Family: Gekkonidae
- Genus: Cyrtodactylus
- Species: C. wallacei

Binomial name
- Cyrtodactylus wallacei Hayden, R. Brown, Gillespie, Setiadi, Linkem, Iskandar, Umilaela, Bickford, Riyanto, Mumpuni & McGuire, 2008

Species of gecko

Cyrtodactylus wallacei is a species of gecko, a lizard in the family Gekkonidae. The species is endemic to Sulawesi.

== Etymology ==
The specific name, wallacei, is in honor of British naturalist Alfred Russel Wallace.

== Description ==
Large for its genus, C. wallacei may attain a snout-to-vent length (SVL) of 11 cm (4.3 in).

== Reproduction ==
C. wallacei is oviparous.
