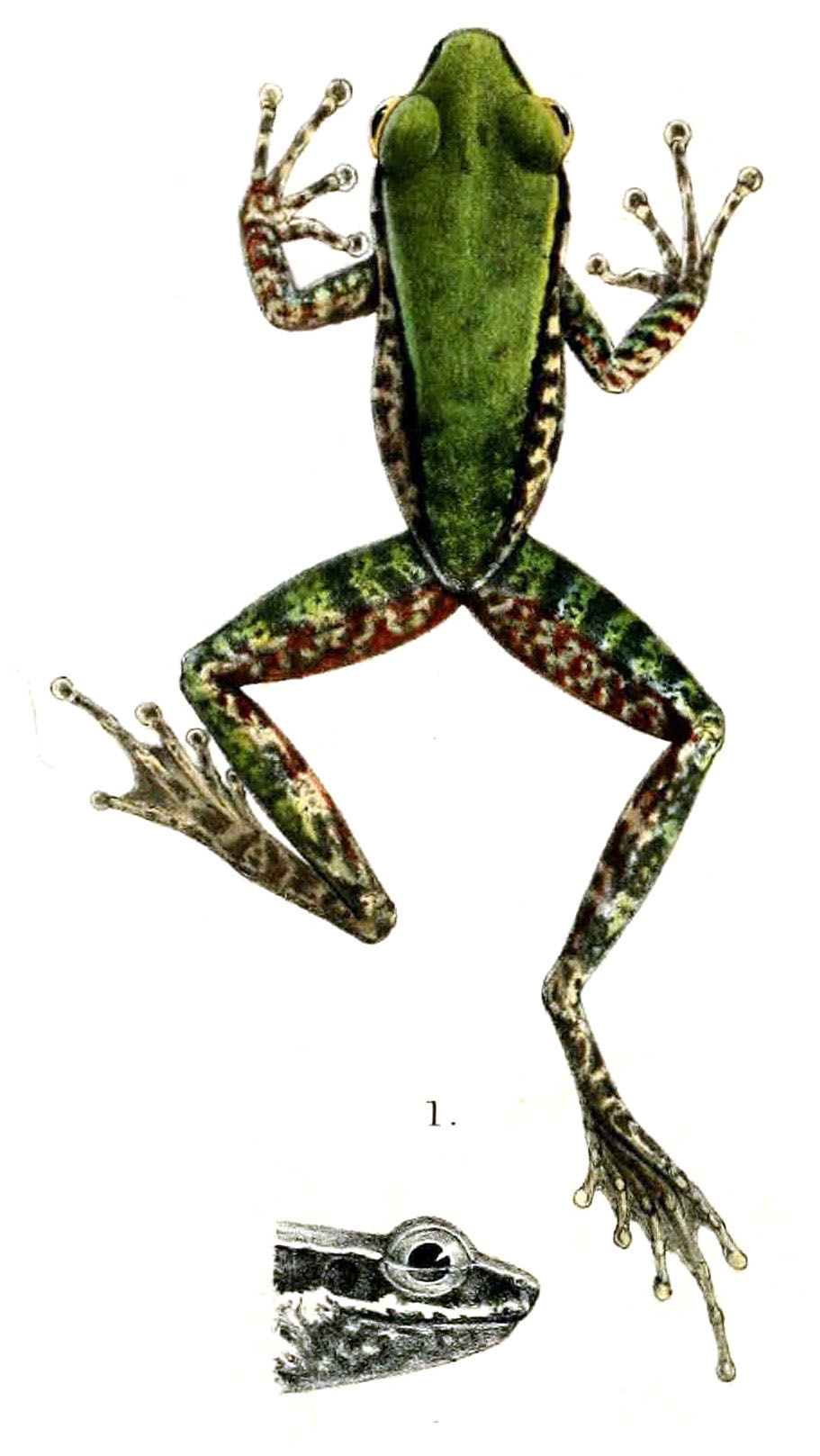

Conservation status
- Vulnerable (IUCN 3.1)

Scientific classification
- Kingdom: Animalia
- Phylum: Chordata
- Class: Amphibia
- Order: Anura
- Family: Ranidae
- Genus: Chalcorana
- Species: C. macrops

Binomial name
- Chalcorana macrops (Boulenger, 1897)

Synonyms
- Rana macrops Boulenger, 1897; Hydrophylax macrops (Boulenger, 1897); Hylarana macrops (Boulenger, 1897)

= Chalcorana macrops =

Species of amphibian

Chalcorana macrops is a species of "true frog" in the family Ranidae. It is endemic to Sulawesi, Indonesia. Common name Masarang frog has been coined for it. The specific name macrops refers to the large eyes of this frog.

== Description ==
Chalcorana macrops grows to at least 45 mm (1.8 in) in snout–vent length. The eyes are very large. The head is rather large with a rounded snout. The tympanum is distinct. The fingers are rather and long slender and have well-developed discs. The toes are two-thirds webbed and have discs that are somewhat smaller than the finger discs. Skin is smooth or with a few small warts dorsally. Dorsal colouration is olive-brown. The sides are greyish and marbled with dark brown. Males have an internal vocal sac.

== Habitat and conservation ==
Chalcorana macrops occurs along canopy-covered streams—its presumed breeding habitat—in primary and secondary lowland forests at elevations of 300–1,000 m (980–3,280 ft) above sea level. It is threatened by habitat loss caused by smallholder farming. Also water pollution from agriculture is a threat. Some of its habitat is protected by the Lore Lindu National Park.
