= Djoko Iskandar =

Indonesian herpetologist

Djoko Tjahjono Iskandar (born 1950) is an Indonesian herpetologist who studies the amphibians of Southeast Asia and Australasia. He is a professor of biosystematics and ecology at Bandung Institute of Technology in West Java, Indonesia.

Iskandar has been the first to describe many species of amphibian, including the Bornean flat-headed frog (Barbourula kalimantanensis) in 1978, and, in 2014, Limnonectes larvaepartus, the only known frog that directly births tadpoles. He is the author of The Amphibians of Java and Bali. The monotypic banded watersnake genus Djokoiskandarus is named in his honour, as are several species of lizard and frog.

== Taxa named in his honour ==
- Djokoiskandarus annulatus (2011)
- Polypedates iskandari (2011)
- Draco iskandari (2007)
- Gekko iskandari (2000)
- Fejervarya iskandari (2001)

== Species described ==
- Ansonia glandulosa Iskandar & Mumpuni, 2004
- Barbourula kalimantanensis Iskandar, 1978
- Boiga hoeseli Ramadhan, Iskandar & Subasri, 2010
- Calamaria banggaiensis Koch, Arida, Mcguire, Iskandar & Böhme, 2009
- Cyrtodactylus batik Iskandar, Rachmansah & Umilaela, 2011
- Cyrtodactylus nuaulu Oliver, Edgar, Mumpuni, Iskandar & Lilley, 2009
- Cyrtodactylus wallacei Hayden, et al., 2008
- Eutropis grandis Howard, Gillespie, Riyanto, Iskandar, 2007
- Hemiphyllodactylus engganoensis Grismer, Riyanto, Iskandar & McGuire, 2014
- Hylarana eschatia (Inger, Stuart, & Iskandar, 2009)
- Hylarana megalonesa (Inger, Stuart & Iskandar, 2009)
- Hylarana parvacola (Inger, Stuart & Iskandar, 2009)
- Hylarana rufipes (Inger, Stuart & Iskandar, 2009)
- Ingerana rajae Iskandar, Bickford, Arifin, 2011
- Kalophrynus minusculus Iskandar, 1998
- Limnonectes kadarsani Iskandar, Boeadi & Sancoyo, 1996
- Limnonectes larvaepartus Iskandar, Evans & McGuire, 2014
- Limnonectes sisikdagu McLeod, Horner, Husted, Barley & Iskandar, 2011
- Litoria megalops (Richards & Iskandar, 2006)
- Litoria purpureolata Oliver, Richards, Tjaturadi & Iskandar, 2007
- Litoria wapogaensis Richards & Iskandar, 2001
- Occidozyga tompotika Iskandar, Arifin & Rachmansah, 2011
- Oreophryne atrigularis Günther, Richards & Iskandar, 2001
- Oreophryne furu Günther, Richards, Tjaturadi, and Iskandar, 2009
- Oreophryne minuta Richards & Iskandar, 2000
- Oreophryne wapoga Günther, Richards & Iskandar, 2001
- Xenophrys parallela (Inger & Iskandar, 2005)
