= Pulau Enggano dwarf gecko =

Scientific classification
- Kingdom: Animalia
- Phylum: Chordata
- Class: Reptilia
- Order: Squamata
- Suborder: Gekkota
- Family: Gekkonidae
- Genus: Hemiphyllodactylus
- Species: H. engganoensis

Binomial name
- Hemiphyllodactylus engganoensis Grismer, Riyanto, Iskandar, & McGuire, 2014

Species of lizard

The Pulau Enggano dwarf gecko (Hemiphyllodactylus engganoensis) is a species of gecko. It is endemic to Enggano Island, Indonesia.
