= White-lipped tree frog (disambiguation) =

The white-lipped tree frog is the world's largest tree frog.

White-lipped tree frog may also refer to:

- Asian white-lipped tree frog, a frog found in Asia
- Wandolleck's white-lipped tree frog, a frog endemic to Papua New Guinea
