= Bornean flat-headed frog =

Conservation status
- Endangered (IUCN 3.1)

Scientific classification
- Kingdom: Animalia
- Phylum: Chordata
- Class: Amphibia
- Order: Anura
- Family: Bombinatoridae
- Genus: Barbourula
- Species: B. kalimantanensis

Binomial name
- Barbourula kalimantanensis Iskandar, 1978
- Map of Borneo depicting range of Bornean flat-headed frog

Species of amphibian

The Bornean flat-headed frog (Barbourula kalimantanensis) is a species of frog in the family Bombinatoridae. For many years, it was thought to be the only frog with no lungs. However, micro CT scanning revealed that, like all other known frog species, the Bornean flat-headed frog has lungs, though they are tiny.

Djoko Iskandar, an Indonesian zoologist, first described the Bornean flat-headed frog based on a single specimen. However, he did not think the frog was lungless until he was in the field with David Bickford's expedition. Bickford et al. dissected some of the specimens and were unable to see the lungs, leading them to incorrectly conclude that no lungs were present.

== Description ==
This frog grows to a snout-to-vent length of 77 mm (3.0 in) for females and males are slightly smaller. It has a dorsoventrally flattened body with a broad head with a rounded snout. The limbs are robust and both hands and feet are fully webbed. The dorsal skin is smooth with small tubercles on the posterior end and the hind legs and the ventral skin is smooth. Its general colour is brown with black mottling.

== Distribution and habitat ==
This aquatic frog lives in cold, clear, and fast rivers in remote areas of the rain forests of Kalimantan, the Indonesian part of the island of Borneo. It is known from only two localities, both in the Kapuas River basin.

== Status ==
The Bornean flat-headed frog is listed as Endangered by the IUCN. It is threatened by habitat loss from severe degradation of the river habitats because of increased turbidity and toxic metals used in mining and other negative consequences of development on the island.

== See also ==
- Lungless salamander
