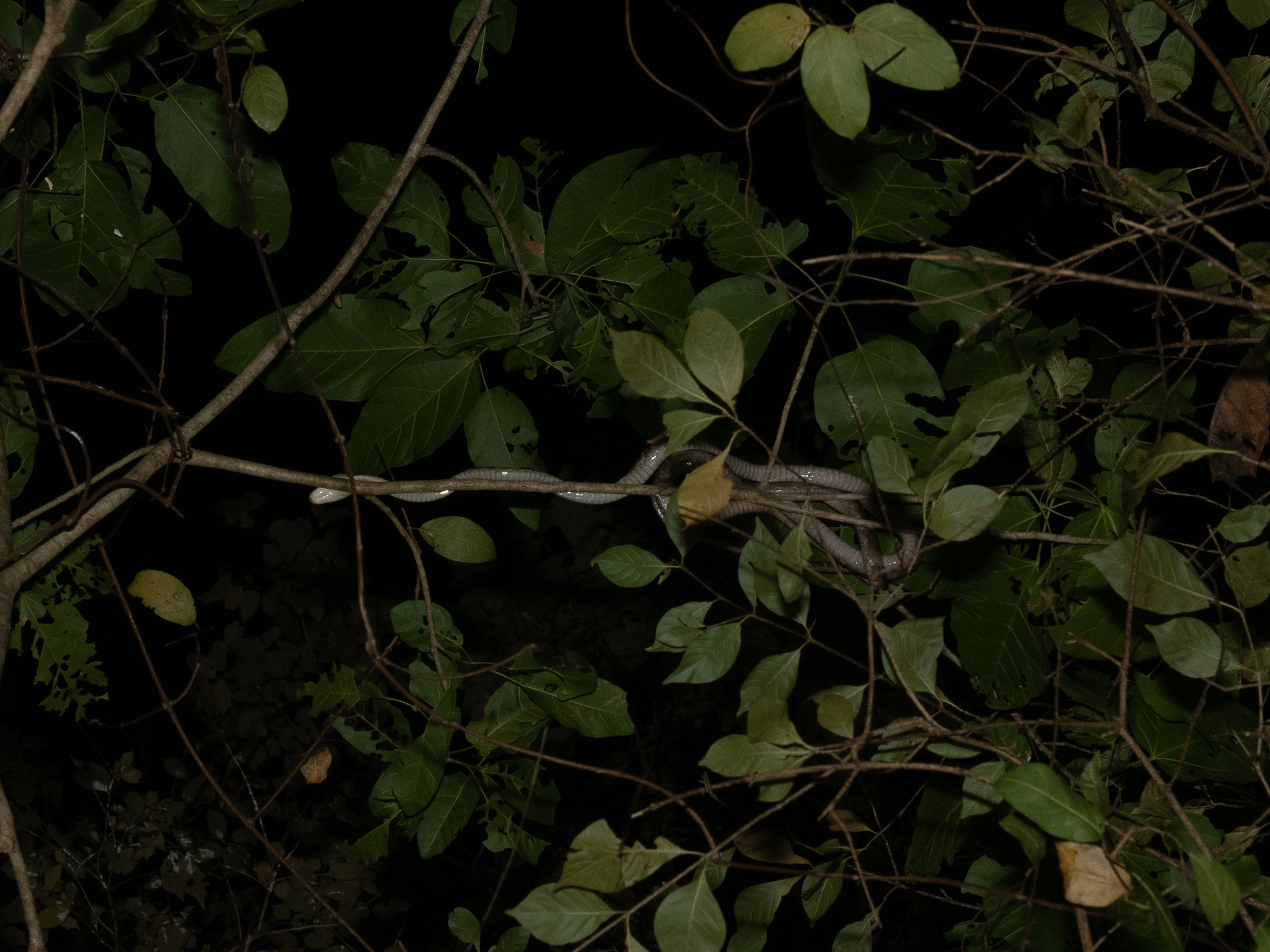

Conservation status
- Data Deficient (IUCN 3.1)

Scientific classification
- Kingdom: Animalia
- Phylum: Chordata
- Class: Reptilia
- Order: Squamata
- Suborder: Serpentes
- Family: Colubridae
- Genus: Boiga
- Species: B. hoeseli

Binomial name
- Boiga hoeseli Ramadhan, Iskandar & Subasri, 2010

= Boiga hoeseli =

Species of snake

Boiga hoeseli, also known as the Lesser Sundas cat snake, is a species of snake of the family Colubridae.

== Geographic range ==
The snake is found in the Lesser Sunda Islands of Indonesia.
