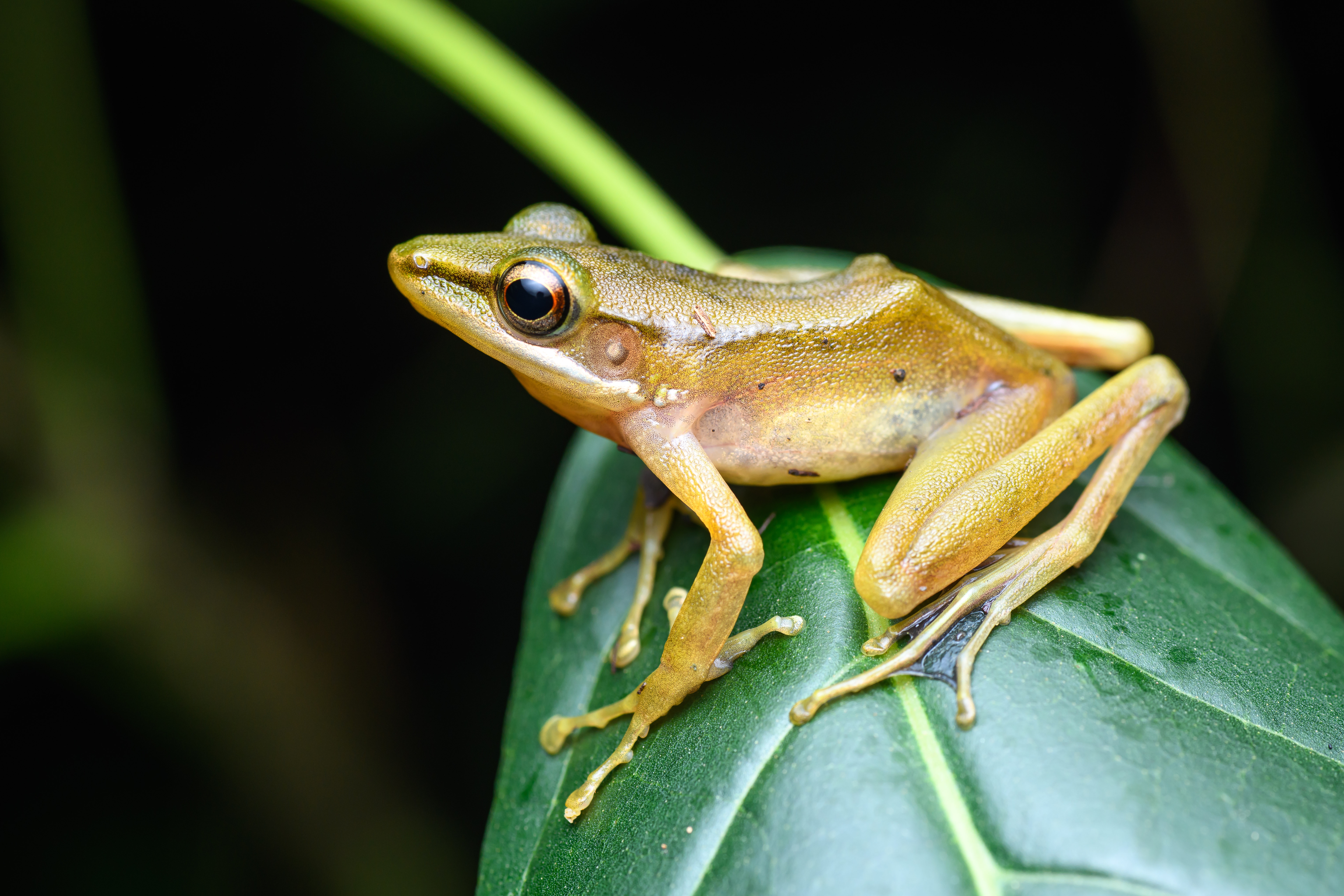

Scientific classification
- Kingdom: Animalia
- Phylum: Chordata
- Class: Amphibia
- Order: Anura
- Family: Ranidae
- Genus: Chalcorana
- Species: C. labialis

Binomial name
- Chalcorana labialis (Boulenger, 1887)

Synonyms
- Rana labialis Boulenger, 1887; Hydrophylax labialis (Boulenger, 1887); Hylarana labialis (Boulenger, 1887)

= Chalcorana labialis =

Species of amphibian

Chalcorana labialis, also known as the white-lipped frog, is a species of "true frog" in the family Ranidae. As currently known, it is endemic to Peninsular Malaysia, although it might also occur in Singapore. Molecular data suggest presence of three distinct lineages in the same area, one of which is not closely related to Chalcorana labialis and which could represent an unnamed species.

== Description ==
Adult males measure 37–48 mm (1.5–1.9 in) and adult females 44–71 mm (1.7–2.8 in) in snout–vent length. The tympanum is distinct. The fingers have well-developed discs but no webbing. The toe discs are somewhat smaller; the toes have extensive webbing. The dorsum varies from dark green to pale yellow, with or without brown spots on the back. The upper lip is creamy yellow or white. The ventral surfaces are cream-coloured. The hind limbs may have dark cross-bars.

== Habitat and conservation ==
Chalcorana labialis occurs on vegetation by forest streams and swamps. It is common. As of April 2019, this species has not been assessed for the IUCN Red List of Threatened Species.
