= Tula Exotarium =

Coordinates: 54.2087°N 37.6196°E

- Interactive map of Tula Exotarium
- Date opened: September 27, 1987
- Land area: 640 m²
- No. of animals: 3475
- Memberships: EARAZA
- Website: www.tulazoo.ru

Tula Regional Exotarium is the State organization of culture of the Tula Region, the Basic Laboratory of the Zoological Institute of the Russian Academy of Sciences, it is a cultural, educational, scientific and conservation center. The Exotarium was opened on September 27, 1987.

== History ==
In 1987 the first Zoo called Tula Exotarium was opened in Tula. At the time its collection consisted of 120 species of animals (fish, amphibians, reptiles, etc.). In 1996 in connection with a difficult financial situation the Exotarium was put from self-financing to the regional budget financing. But it did not solve the main problem, which is the state of the old building. During these years many problems concerning construction of a new building have been solved.

== Scientific research ==
Successes in breeding of hundreds of species of reptiles from all the continents permitted to receive offspring from dozens of species of reptiles.

== Public exhibition ==
Only the tenth part of the collection (namely 55 species) is shown at the public exhibition.

== Work with visitors ==
Except for the public exhibition on their own or a review excursion, thematic excursions are offered to visitors; studies based on the contact with animals, competitions; festivals; temporal thematic exhibitions; events, devoted to the International campaigns, and also different programs and services for various categories of visitors are carried out.

== Festivals, exhibitions and other events ==
Regularly exhibitions are organized at Exotarium, where it is possible to see very rare animals that are kept and bred in the closed scientific laboratories of the Exotarium.
