= Chalcorana rufipes =

Conservation status
- Least Concern (IUCN 3.1)

Scientific classification
- Kingdom: Animalia
- Phylum: Chordata
- Class: Amphibia
- Order: Anura
- Family: Ranidae
- Genus: Chalcorana
- Species: C. rufipes

Binomial name
- Chalcorana rufipes (Inger, Stuart, and Iskandar, 2009)

Synonyms
- Rana rufipes Inger, Stuart, and Iskandar, 2009; Hylarana rufipes (Inger, Stuart, and Iskandar, 2009)

Species of amphibian

Chalcorana rufipes is a species of "true frog" in the family Ranidae. It is endemic to Sumatra, Indonesia. It was split off from Chalcorana chalconota by Robert Inger and colleagues in 2009, along with a number of other species. The specific name rufipes is derived from Latin rufus meaning reddish and pes meaning foot, in reference to the reddish tinge on the underside of the pedal webbing in life.

== Description ==
Chalcorana rufipes are moderately large frogs: adult males measure 44–48 mm (1.7–1.9 in) and females 54–64 mm (2.1–2.5 in) in snout–vent length. Body is slender and the legs are long. The snout is obtusely pointed. The tympanum is distinct but comparatively small. The outer fingers have large discs; no webbing is present. The toe tips have discs that are smaller than the fingers ones. The webbing between the toes is extensive. Preserved specimens are medium brown dorsally and on the sides. The sides of the head are dark brown. The upper lip is white. There are small dark spots on the dorsal surfaces. The venter is whitish without markings, Some individuals have dark crossbars on the hind limbs. The webbing between the toes is ventrally reddish but fades under preservation.

== Habitat and conservation ==
Chalcorana rufipes is found in pristine and disturbed forests as well as in more open areas and in between forests and fields (e.g., near villages) at elevations of 255–500 m (837–1,640 ft) above sea level. It is semi-aquatic and semi-arboreal species that is active by day and night. It is a locally common frog where suitable habitat exists. However, it is threatened by clear-cutting of lowland tropical rainforest for oil palm plantations, small holder agriculture, and wood extraction. Use of insecticides might also be a threat. Its range overlaps with some protected areas.
