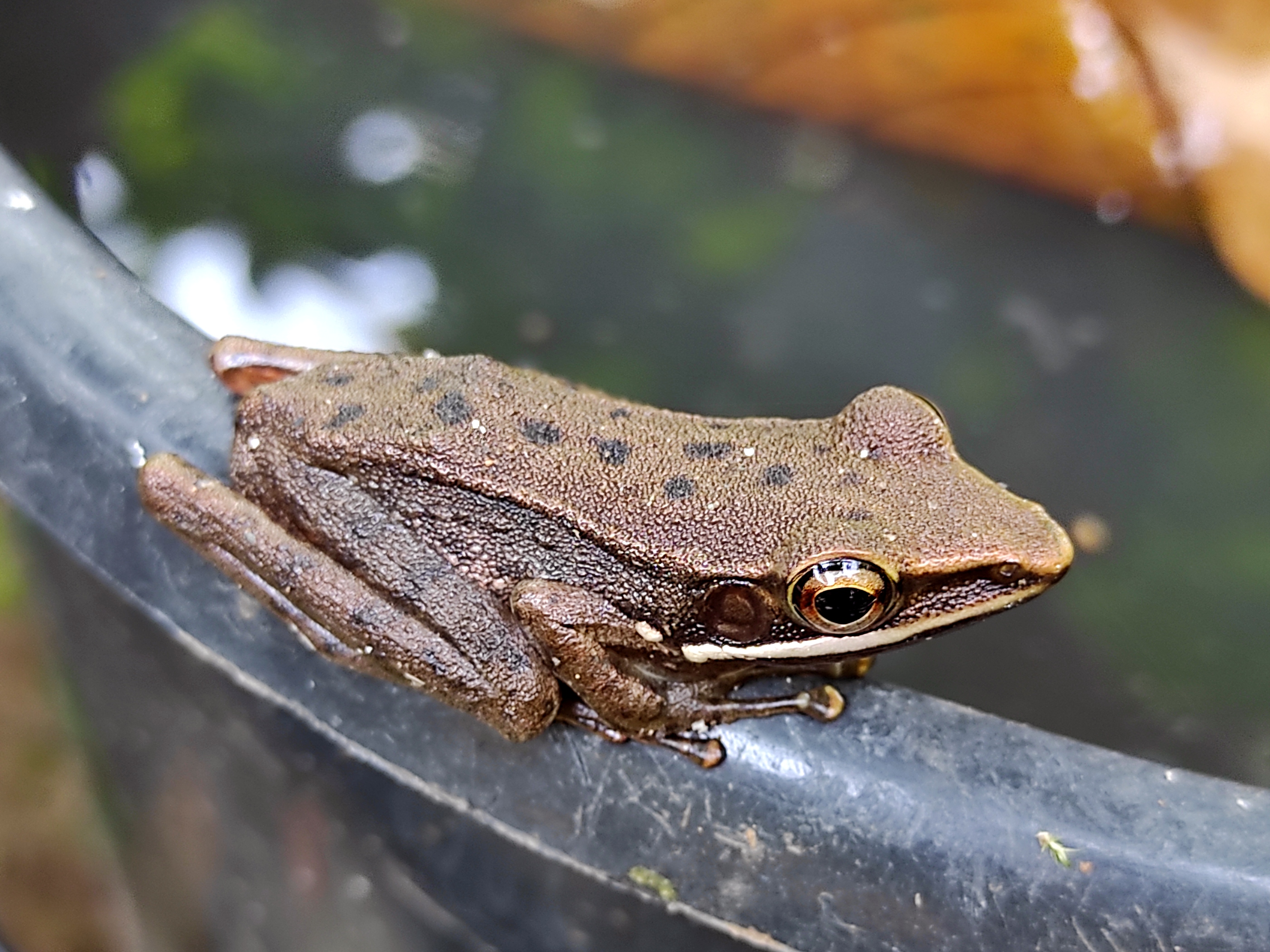

Conservation status
- Least Concern (IUCN 3.1)

Scientific classification
- Kingdom: Animalia
- Phylum: Chordata
- Class: Amphibia
- Order: Anura
- Family: Ranidae
- Genus: Chalcorana
- Species: C. chalconota

Binomial name
- Chalcorana chalconota (Schlegel, 1837)

Synonyms
- Hyla chalconotus Schlegel, 1837; Polypedates chalconotus (Schlegel, 1837); Rana chalconota (Schlegel, 1837); Hydrophylax chalconotus Schlegel, 1837; Hylarana chalconota (Schlegel, 1837); Polypedates junghunii Bleeker, 1856

= Chalcorana chalconota =

Species of amphibian

Chalcorana chalconota is a species of "true frog", family Ranidae. It is endemic to Indonesia and occurs in southern Sumatra, Java, Bali, and a few smaller islands. Populations previously assigned to this species now belong to a number of other Chalcorana species, leading to the current delineation of Chalcorana chalconota with a much narrower range. This species is also known as the Schlegel's frog, brown stream frog, copper-cheeked frog, or, among with many other species, white-lipped frog.

== Description ==
Chalcorana chalconota are relatively large frogs: adult males measure 34–50 mm (1.3–2.0 in) and females 49–73 mm (1.9–2.9 in) in snout–vent length. The legs are relatively short. The snout is slightly projecting. The tympanum is visible, slightly depressed. The finger tips are much enlarged. Coloration is green; the back may have black spots. Hind limbs may have crossbars. Dorsal skin is granular in females and has many fine spinules in males. Males also have conspicuously protruding humeral glands.

== Habitat and conservation ==
Chalcorana chalconota can be found along small lowland forest streams, but also away from streams in forest and in highland areas at elevations up to 1,571 m (5,154 ft) above sea level. It occurs in both primary and degraded forests, and it can be found in human settlements, plantations, and rubbish-filled ponds. Breeding takes place in a range of aquatic habitats: quiet side pools of forest streams, temporary forest edge ponds, irrigation channels, and ditches in paddy fields. There are no major threats to this common species. It occurs in several protected areas.
