= List of amphibians of Thailand =

The following is a list of amphibians of Thailand. There are more than 160 species recorded.

== Species list ==
The following table is a checklist of amphibians of Thailand, with geographic ranges, citations, and Thai names included.

Scientific name	Family	Common name	Thai name	Geographical range	Citation
Tylototriton uyenoi	Salamandridae	-	กระท่าง, จักกิ้มน้ำ, จักก่าน้ำ	North (Chiang Mai)	Nishikawa et al., 2013
Tylototriton panhai	Salamandridae	-	กระท่าง, จักกิ้มน้ำ, จักก่าน้ำ	Northeast (Phitsanulok and Loei)	Nishikawa et al., 2013
Caudacaecilia asplenia	Ichthyophiidae	Malayan Caecilian	ขียดงูมลายู	South (Yala)	(Taylor, 1965)
Caudacaecilia larutensis	Ichthyophiidae	Larut Hill Caecilian	เขียดงูบาลา	South (Narathiwat)	(Taylor, 1960)
Ichthyophis acuminatus	Ichthyophiidae	Pointed-snouted Caecilian	เขียดงูหัวแหลม	North (Lampang)	Taylor, 1960
Ichthyophis kohtaoensis	Ichthyophiidae	Ko Tao Caecilian	เขียดงูเกาะเต่า	Southeast, southwest and south	Taylor, 1960
Ichthyophis supachaii	Ichthyophiidae	Supachai's Caecilian	เขียดงูศุภชัย	South (Nakhon Sri Thammarat)	Taylor, 1960
Ichthyophis youngorum	Ichthyophiidae	Doi Suthep Caecilian	เขียดงูดอยสุเทพ	North (Chang Mai)	Taylor, 1960
Amolops larutensis	Ranidae	Larut Torrent Frog	ปาดลายหินเมืองใต้	South	(Boulenger, 1899)
Amolops marmoratus	Ranidae	Northern Cascade Frog	ปาดคลายหินเมืองเหนือ	Northwest	(Blyth, 1855)
Amolops archotaphus	Ranidae	Doi Inthanon Rock Frog	กบชะง่อนหินอินทนนท์	North (Chiang Mai and Chiang Rai)	Inger and Chanard, 1997
Amolops panhai	Ranidae	Tenasserim Cascade Frog		Burma border from Ranong to Mae Wong National Park	Matsui and Nabhitabhata 2006
Huia melasma	Ranidae	Siamese Cascade Frog		North and west	Stuart, FL and Chan-ard, T, 2005
Alcalus tasanae	Ranidae	Tasan Frog	กบท่าสาน	Central peninsula	(Smith, 1921)
Nanorana aenea	Dicroglossidae	Doi Chang Frog	กบดอยช้าง	North	(Smith, 1922)
Hoplobatrachus rugulosus	Dicroglossidae	Rugose Frog	กบนา, กบเนื้อ	widespread	(Wiegmann, 1835)
Ingerana tenasserimensis	Dicroglossidae	Tenasserim Frog	กบตะนาวศรี	Southwest and south	(Sclater, 1892)
Fejervarya chiangmaiensis	Dicroglossidae	-		North (Chiang Mai)	Suwannapoom et al., 2016
Fejervarya cancrivora	Dicroglossidae	Mangrove Frog		widespread except north	(Gravenhorst, 1829)
Fejervarya limnocharis	Dicroglossidae	Field Frog	กบหนอง, เขียดอีโม่, เขียดบักโม่	widespread	(Boie, 1835)
Fejervarya raja	Dicroglossidae	Rajah Frog	กบราชา	South	(Smith, 1930)
Fejervarya triora	Dicroglossidae	Sandstone Frog		Northeast (Ubon Ratchathani)	Stuart, BL, Chuaynkern, Y, Chan-ard, T and Inger, RF, 2006
Limnonectes blythii	Dicroglossidae	Blyth's Giant Frog	กบทูด, เขียวแลว	North, southwest and south	(Boulenger, 1920)
Limnonectes malesianus	Dicroglossidae	Malaysian Peat Frog	กบทูดมลายู	Extreme south	(Kiew, 1984)
Limnonectes paramacrodon	Dicroglossidae	Peat Swamp Frog	กบป่าพรุ	South (Narathiwat)	(Inger, 1966)
Limnonectes taylori	Dicroglossidae	Taylor's Frog		Northwest	Matsui et al. (2010)
Limnonectes jarujini	Dicroglossidae	Jarujin's Frog		West	Matsui M, Panha S, Khonsue W and Kuraishi N 2010
Limnonectes megastomias	Dicroglossidae	Korat Big-mouthed Frog		Northeast	McLeod DS, 2008
Limnonectes isanensis	Dicroglossidae	Isan Big-headed Frog		Northeast (Loei)	McLeod DS, Kelly JK and Barley A, 2012
Limnonectes limborgi	Dicroglossidae	Limborg's Frog	กบกา	West	(Sclater, 1892)
Limnonectes laticeps	Dicroglossidae	Rivulet Frog		Extreme south	Frost, D.R. 2013
Limnonectes doriae	Dicroglossidae	Doria's Frog	กบดอร์เรีย	North, southwest and south	(Boulenger, 1887)
Limnonectes kohchangae	Dicroglossidae	Ko Chang Frog	กบเกาะช้าง	Southeast	(Smith, 1922)
Limnonectes macrognathus	Dicroglossidae	Large-headed Frog	กบหัวโต	Peninsula, Phuket and maybe north	(Boulenger, 1917)
Limnonectes gyldenstolpei	Dicroglossidae	Capped Frog	กบหงอน, กบหัวโล่, กบหอน	widespread	(Boulenger, 1916)
Limnonectes plicatellus	Dicroglossidae	Rhinoceros Frog	กบแรด, กบหงอนมลายู	South	(Stoliczka, 1873)
Limnonectes lauhachindai	Dicroglossidae	Lauhachinda's Fanged Frog		Northeast (Ubon Ratchathani)	Aowphol, A, Rujirawan, A, Taksintum, W, Chuaynkern, Y and Stuart, BL, 2015
Limnonectes hascheanus	Dicroglossidae	Stoliczka's Frog	กบป่าไผ่	Southwest and south	(Stoliczka, 1870)
Occidozyga laevis	Dicroglossidae	Spotted Puddle Frog	เขียดลื่น	Extreme south	(Günther, 1859)
Occidozyga lima	Dicroglossidae	Common Puddle Frog	เขียดจะนา, เขียดจ่านา	South	(Gravenhorst, 1829)
Occidozyga magnapustulosus	Dicroglossidae	Pearl-tipped Pustuled Puddle Frog		North and northeast	(Taylor and Elbel, 1958)
Occidozyga martensii	Dicroglossidae	Martens's Puddle Frog	เขียดทราย, เขียดหลังปุ่ม	widespread	(Peters, 1867)
Quasipaa bourreti	Dicroglossidae	Bourret's Frog	กบเวียดนาม	Northwest	(Dubois, 1987)
Quasipaa fasciculispina	Dicroglossidae	Spiny-breasted Frog	กบอกหนาม, กบแรด	Southeast	(Inger, 1970)
Clinotarsus penelope	Ranidae	Hill Frog	กบเขาสูง	Southwest and south	Boulenger, 1882
Amnirana nicobariensis	Ranidae	Nicobar Cricket Frog	กบนิโคบาร์	South	(Stoliczka, 1870)
Odorrana hosii	Ranidae	Hose's Frog	กบชะง่อนหินภาคใต้	South	Boulenger, 1891
Odorrana chloronota	Ranidae	Chloronate Huia Frog		West, central and northeast	(Günther, 1875)
Odorrana schmackeri	Ranidae	Schmaker's Frog	กบดอยอินทนนท์	North (Chiang Mai)	Boettger, 1892
Odorrana andersonii	Ranidae	Anderson's Frog	กบแอนเดอสัน	North (Chiang Mai)	Boulenger, 1882
Odorrana aureola	Ranidae	Phu Luang Rock Frog		Northeast (Loei)	Stuart, BL, Chuaynkern, Y, Chan-ard, T and Inger, RF, 2006
Odorrana indeprensa	Ranidae	Khao Yai Rock Frog		Northeast (Nakhon Ratchasima)	(Bain and Stuart, 2006)
Odorrana nasica	Ranidae	Vietnamese Frog		North and west	(Boulenger, 1903)
Chalcorana eschatia	Ranidae	-		Peninsula and Phuket	Inger RF, Stuart BL and Iskandar DT, 2009
Chalcorana scutigera	Ranidae	-		South	(Andersson, 1916)
Abavorana luctuosa	Ranidae	Mahogany Frog	กบเขาท้องลาย	South	(Peters, 1871)
Indosylvirana milleti	Ranidae	Millet's Frog	กบเขาใหญ่	Central, east and southeast	Smith, 1921
Hylarana faber	Ranidae	Chanthaburi Stream Frog	กบเขาสอยดาว	Southeast (Chanthaburi)	Smith, 1921
Hylarana erythraea	Ranidae	Green-backed Frog	กบบัว, เขียดจิก	widespread	(Schlegel, 1837)
Hylarana macrodactyla	Ranidae	Stripe-backed Frog	กบหลังขีด	widespread	(Günther, 1859)
Hylarana taipehensis	Ranidae	Taiwanese Frog	กบไต้หวัน	North, northeast and east	Van Denburgh, 1909
Hydrophylax leptoglossa	Ranidae	Cope's Frog	กบสังขละ	West	(Cope, 1868)
Rana johnsi	Ranidae	Johns's Frog	กบสีชมพู	Northeast (Loei)	Smith, 1921
Pelophylax lateralis	Ranidae	Yellow Frog	กบหลังไพล, เขียดเหลือง, กบเหลือง	widespread except south	Boulenger, 1887
Pulchrana glandulosa	Ranidae	Rough-sided Frog	กบว๊ากใหญ่, หมาน้ำ	South	Boulenger, 1882
Pulchrana banjarana	Ranidae	Banjaran Frog		South (Yala)	Leong and Lim 2003
Pulchrana laterimaculata	Ranidae	Masked Rough-sided Frog		South (Narathiwat)	Leong, TM, Matsui, M, Yong, HS and Hamid, AA, 2003
Pulchrana signata	Ranidae	Spotted Stream Frog		South	(Günther, 1872)
Sylvirana nigrovittata	Ranidae	Dark-sided Frog	กบอ่อง, เขียดอ่อง, เขียดโงด, เขียดโง่	widespread	(Blyth, 1856)
Sylvirana cubitalis	Ranidae	Dark-eared Frog	กบหูดำ	widespread	Smith, 1917
Sylvirana mortenseni	Ranidae	Mortensen's Frog		Southeast (Khao Yai to Ko Chang)	Chen, Murphy, Lathrop, Ngo, Orlov, Ho, and Somorjai. 2005
Humerana miopus	Ranidae	Three-striped Frog	กบหลังลายเฉียง	South	Boulenger, 1918
Babina chapaensis	Ranidae	Glandular-sided Frog		Northeast	
Brachytarsophrys carinensis	Megophryidae	Burmese Horned Frog	อึ่งกรายข้างแถบ	North, southwest and south	(Boulenger, 1889)
Brachytarsophrys feae	Megophryidae	Fae's Horned Frog	อึ่งกรายพม่า	North (Chiang Mai)	(Boulenger, 1887)
Leptobrachium chapaense	Megophryidae	White-eyed Litter Frog	อึ่งกรายตาขาว	North (Chiang Mai)	(Bourret, 1937)
Leptobrachium hendricksoni	Megophryidae	Spotted Litter Frog	อึ่งกรายลายจุด	South	Taylor, 1962
Leptobrachium smithi	Megophryidae	Smith's Litter Frog	อึ่งกรายลายเลอะ	widespread	Matsui, Nabhitabhata and Panha, 1999
Leptolalax bourreti	Megophryidae	Bourret's Litter Frog		North (Chiang Mai)	(Boulenger, 1893)
Leptolalax gracilis	Megophryidae	Gracile Litter Frog	อึ่งกรายทองผาภูมิ	West (Kanchanaburi)	(Gunther, 1872)
Leptolalax heteropus	Megophryidae	Variable Litter Frog	อึ่งกรายหลากสี	Extreme south	(Boulenger, 1893)
Leptolalax pelodytoides	Megophryidae	Mud Litter Frog		North and west	(Boulenger, 1893)
Leptolalax melanoleucus	Megophryidae	-		South (Surat Thani)	Matsui, 2006
Leptolalax fuliginosus	Megophryidae	-		Peninsula (Prachuap Khiri Khan)	Matsui, 2006
Leptolalax solus	Megophryidae	-		South (Yala and Nakhon Sri Thammarat)	Matsui, 2006
Leptolalax minimus	Megophryidae	-		North (Chiang Mai)	Taylor, 1962
Megophrys nasuta	Megophryidae	Long-nosed Horned Frog	อึ่งกรายหัวแหลม	South	(Schlegel, 1858)
Megophrys aceras	Megophryidae	Malayan Horned Frog	อึ่งกรายหัวมน	South	(Boulenger, 1903)
Megophrys longipes	Megophryidae	Slender-legged Horned Frog	อึ่งกรายขายาว	South	(Boulenger, 1886)
Megophrys major	Megophryidae	Greater Stream Horned Frog		North, northeast and southwest	Boulenger, 1908
Megophrys minor	Megophryidae	Dwarf Horned Frog	อึ่งกรายแคระ	North (Chiang Mai)	Stejneger, 1926
Megophrys parva	Megophryidae	Lesser Stream Horned Frog	อึ่งกรายหัวยเล็ก	North and southwest	(Boulenger, 1893)
Megophrys lekaguli	Megophryidae	Chanthaburi Horned Frog		Southeast	Stuart BL, Chuaynkern Y, Chan-ard T and Inger RF, 2006
Megophrys sp. nov.	Megophryidae	-		South (Surat Thani)	
Megophrys takensis	Megophryidae	Tak Horned Frog		West	Mahony, S, 2011
Ophryophryne microstoma	Megophryidae	Narrow-mouthed Horned Frog	อึ่งกรายปากแคบ	North (Nan)	Boulenger, 1903
Ansonia inthanon	Bufonidae	Inthanon Stream Toad	คางคกหัวยอินทนนท์	North (Chiang Mai)	Matsui, Nabhitabhata and Panha, 1998
Ansonia kraensis	Bufonidae	Kra Stream Toad		Isthmus of Kra	Matsui M, Khonsue W, Nabhitabhata J. 2005
Ansonia malayana	Bufonidae	Malayan Stream Toad	คางคกห้วยมลายู	Extreme south	Inger, 1960
Ansonia siamensis	Bufonidae	Siamese Stream Toad	คางคกห้วยไทย	South (Trang)	Kiew, 1985, 1884
Ansonia khaochangensis	Bufonidae	Khao Chang Stream Toad		South (Phang Nga)	
Ansonia sp. nov.	Bufonidae	-		South (Phuket)	
Phrynoidis aspera	Bufonidae	River Toad	จงโคร่ง, หมาน้ำ, กะทาหอง, กง	widespread	Gravenhorst, 1829
Ingerophrynus macrotis	Bufonidae	Flat-headed Toad	คางตกหัวราบ, คางคกเหลือง	widespread	Boulenger, 1887
Ingerophrynus parvus	Bufonidae	Indochinese Dwarf Toad	คางคกแคระ, คางคกไฟ	widespread	Boulenger, 1887
Duttaphrynus melanostictus	Bufonidae	Black-spined Toad	คางคกบ้าน, ขี้คางคาก, คางคาก	widespread	(Schneider, 1799)
Leptophryne borbonica	Bufonidae	Slender-legged Stream Toad	คางคกขายาว	South	(Tschudi, 1838)
Rentapia hosii	Bufonidae	Malayan Brown Toad	คางคกต้นไม้	Extreme south	(Boulenger, 1892)
Hyla annectans	Hylidae	Indian Leaf Frog	ปาดเมืองจีน	North (Mae Hong Son)	(Jerdon, 1870)
Chiromantis doriae	Rhacophoridae	Doria's Bush Frog	ปาดจิ๋วหลังขีด	North	Boulenger, 1893
Chiromantis nongkhorensis	Rhacophoridae	Nong Khor Bush Frog	ปาดจิ๋วลายแต้ม	East, southeast and southwest	(Cochran, 1927)
Chiromantis sp. nov.	Rhacophoridae	-		South (Chumphon)	
Feihyla vittata	Rhacophoridae	Burmese Bush Frog	ปาดจิ๋วพม่า	widespread	(Boulenger, 1887)
Feihyla hansenae	Rhacophoridae	Hansen's Bush Frog	ปาดจิ๋วป่าตะวันออก	North, northeast and east	(Cochran, 1927)
Gracixalus carinensis	Rhacophoridae	Karin Hills Bush Frog	ปาดแคระหลังขีด	North (Chiang Mai)	(Boulenger, 1893)
Gracixalus gracilipes	Rhacophoridae	Slender-legged Bush Frog	ปาดแคระขาเรียว	North (Chiang Mai)	Bourret, 1937
Gracixalus seesom	Rhacophoridae	-		West	Delorme, Dubois, Grosjean & Ohler, 2005
Kurixalus bisacculus	Rhacophoridae	Taylor's Tree Frog	ปาดลายเลอะอีสาน	East and southwest	Taylor, 1962
Kurixalus verrucosus	Rhacophoridae	Boulenger's Tree Frog	ปาดลายเลอะเหนือ	Northeast and west southward to Phang Nga	(Günther, 1859)
Kurixalus appendiculatus	Rhacophoridae	Frilled Tree Frog		South (south of Phang Nga)	
Raorchestes parvulus	Rhacophoridae	Dwarf Bush Frog	ปาดแคระป่า	Northeast and southeast	(Boulenger, 1893)
Philautus petersi	Rhacophoridae	Peters's Bush Frog		Extreme south	(Boulenger, 1900)
Philautus vermiculatus	Rhacophoridae	Vermiculate Bush Frog	ปาดแคระท้องลาย	South (Yala)	(Boulenger, 1900)
Polypedates colletti	Rhacophoridae	Collett's Tree Frog	ปาดนิ้วแยกมลายู	South	(Boulenger, 1890)
Polypedates discantus	Rhacophoridae	Malayan Slender Tree Frog		South	Rujirawan A, Stuart BL and Aowphol A, 2013
Polypedates leucomystax	Rhacophoridae	Four-lined Tree Frog	ปาดบ้าน	West and south (south of Prachuap Khiri Khan)	(Gravenhorst, 1829)
Polypedates macrotis	Rhacophoridae	Dark-eared Tree Frog	ปาดหูดำ	South	(Boulenger, 1891)
Polypedates megacephalus	Rhacophoridae	White-lipped Tree Frog		North of Prachuap Khiri Khan	(Smith, 1940)
Rhacophorus bipunctatus	Rhacophoridae	Twin-spotted Tree Frog	ปาดตีนเหลือง	West and south	(Peters, 1867)
Rhacophorus rhodopus	Rhacophoridae	Red-Webbed Tree Frog		East	Bordoli S, Bortamuli T and Ohler, A, 2007
Rhacophorus cyanopunctatus	Rhacophoridae	Blue-spotted Tree Frog	ปาดจุดฟ้า	South	Manthey and Steiof, 1998
Rhacophorus orlovi	Rhacophoridae	Orlov's Tree Frog	ปาดตีนเหลืองอีสาน	East (Amnat Charoen)	Zeigler and Kohler, 2001
Rhacophorus feae	Rhacophoridae	Fae's Tree Frog	ปาดดอยอินทนนท์	North and northeast	(Boulenger, 1893)
Rhacophorus maximus	Rhacophoridae	Giant Tree Frog	ปาดยักษ์	Southwest	Günther, 1859, 1858)
Rhacophorus nigropalmatus	Rhacophoridae	Wallace's Tree Frog	ปาดเขียวตีนดำ	South	Boulenger, 1895
Rhacophorus norhayatii	Rhacophoridae	Norhayati's Tree Frog		Northwest and extreme south	Onn, CK and Grismer, LL, 2010
Rhacophorus pardalis	Rhacophoridae	Harlequin Tree Frog	ปาดตีนแดง	South (Yala)	Gunther, 1858
Rhacophorus prominanus	Rhacophoridae	Jade Tree Frog	ปาดเขียวตีนแดง	South	Smith, 1924
Rhacophorus reinwardtii	Rhacophoridae	Reinwardt's Tree Frog	ปาดเขียวตีนลาย	Southwest and south	(Schlegel, 1837)
Rhacophorus robinsonii	Rhacophoridae	Robinson's Tree Frog	ปาดขาลาย	South	Boulenger, 1903
Rhacophorus jarujini	Rhacophoridae	Jarujin's Tree Frog		Northeast	Matsui and Panha, 2006
Rhacophorus kio	Rhacophoridae	Black-webbed Tree Frog		Northwest	Ohler, A and Delorme, M, 2006
Theloderma albopunctatum	Rhacophoridae	Northern Pied Warted Tree Frog		widespread except south	
Theloderma asperum	Rhacophoridae	Southern Pied Warted Tree Frog	ปาดตะปุ่มเล็ก	Extreme south	(Boulenger, 1886)
Theloderma gordoni	Rhacophoridae	Large Warted Tree Frog	ปาดตะปุ่มใหญ่	North (Chiang Mai)	Taylor, 1962
Theloderma horridum	Rhacophoridae	Malayan Warted Tree Frog	ปาดตะปุ่มมลายู	Extreme south	(Boulenger, 1903)
Theloderma stellatum	Rhacophoridae	Chanthaburi Warted Tree Frog	ปาดตะปุ่มจันทบุรี	North, east and southeast	Taylor, 1962
Theloderma pictum	Rhacophoridae	Cinnamon Tree Frog		South	Poyarkov, Orlov, Moiseeva, Pawangkhanant, Ruangsuwan, Vassilieva, Galoyan, Nguyen and Gogoleva, 2015
Theloderma licin	Rhacophoridae	Smooth Frog		South	McLeod, DS and Ahmad, N, 2007.
Chaperina fusca	Microhylidae	Spiny-heeled Froglet	อึ่งส้นหนาม	Peninsula (Surat Thani)	(Blyth, 1856)
Calluella guttulata	Microhylidae	Striped Spadefoot Frog	อึ่งลาย	widespread	(Blyth, 1856)
Calluella sp. nov.	Microhylidae	-		South (Krabi)	
Glyphoglossus molossus	Microhylidae	Truncate-snouted Burrowing Frog	อึ่งเพ้า, อึ่งปากขวด	widespread except south	Günther, 1869
Kalophrynus interlineatus	Microhylidae	Striped Sticky Frog	อึ่งปุ่มหลังลาย	North, northeast and southeast	Blyth, 1855
Kalophrynus pleurostigma	Microhylidae	Red-sided Sticky Frog	อึ่งปุ่มมลายู	South	Tschudi, 1838
Kaloula latidisca	Microhylidae	Wide-disked Narrow-mouthed Frog		Southwest and south	
Kaloula mediolineata	Microhylidae	Median-striped Bullfrog	อึ่งอ่างก้นขีด	widespread	Smith, 1917
Kaloula pulchra	Microhylidae	Banded Bullfrog	อึ่งอ่างบ้าน	widespread	Gray, 1831
Kaloula aureata	Microhylidae	Golden Bullfrog		South (Surat Thani and Nakhon Si Thammarat)	Pauwels, OSG and Cherot, F, 2006
Phrynella pulchra	Microhylidae	Red-bellied Frog	อึ่งท้องแดง	Extreme south	Boulenger, 1887
Microhyla annamensis	Microhylidae	Annam Chorus Frog	อึ่งอันนัม	Southeast (Chanthaburi)	Smith, 1923
Microhyla annectens	Microhylidae	Boulenger's Chorus Frog	อึ่งน้ำเต้ามลายู	South (Chumphon)	Boulenger, 1900
Microhyla berdmorei	Microhylidae	Berdmore's Chorus Frog	อึ่งแม่หนาว	widespread	(Blyth, 1856)
Microhyla butleri	Microhylidae	Noisy Chorus Frog	อึ่งลายแต้ม	widespread	Boulenger, 1900
Microhyla heymonsi	Microhylidae	Dark-sided Chorus Frog	อึ่งข้างดำ	widespread	Vogt, 1911
Microhyla mukhlesuri	Microhylidae	Mukhlesur's Chorus Frog		widespread	
Microhyla pulchra	Microhylidae	Painted Chorus Frog	อึ่งขาคำ, เขียดขาคำ	widespread	(Hallowell, 1861)
Micryletta inornata	Microhylidae	Inornate Chorus Frog	อึ่งหลังจุด, อึ่งหลังขีด	widespread	(Boulenger, 1890)

== Common species ==
Amphibian species commonly found in anthropogenically modified environments include:

Family Bufonidae (True toads)

- Duttaphrynus melanostictus

Family Microhylidae (Narrow-mouthed frogs)

- Kaloula pulchra
- Microhyla butleri
- Microhyla fissipes (formerly classified as Microhyla ornata)
- Microhyla heymonsi
- Microhyla pulchra

Family Dicroglossidae (Fork-tongued frogs)

- Fejervarya limnocharis
- Hoplobatrachus rugulosus
- Occidozyga lima
- Occidozyga martensii

Family Ranidae (True frogs)

- Hylarana erythraea
- Hylarana macrodactyla

Family Rhacophoridae (Afro-Asian tree frogs)

- Polypedates leucomystax

== See also ==
- List of reptiles of Thailand
- List of birds of Thailand
- List of mammals of Thailand
- List of butterflies of Thailand
- List of non-marine molluscs of Thailand
- List of species native to Thailand
