= Malaya frog =

Malaya frog may refer to:

- Malaya bug-eyed frog (Theloderma leporosum), a frog in the family Rhacophoridae found in Peninsular Malaysia and Sumatra
- Malaya wart frog (Limnonectes macrodon), a frog in the family Dicroglossidae endemic to Sumatra and Java, Indonesia
