= Theloderma phrynoderma =

Conservation status
- Least Concern (IUCN 3.1)

Scientific classification
- Kingdom: Animalia
- Phylum: Chordata
- Class: Amphibia
- Order: Anura
- Family: Rhacophoridae
- Genus: Theloderma
- Species: T. phrynoderma

Binomial name
- Theloderma phrynoderma (Ahl, 1927)

Synonyms
- Phrynoderma asperum Boulenger, 1893 – secondary homonym of Ixalus asper Boulenger, 1886; Rhacophorus phrynoderma Ahl, 1927 – replacement name

Species of amphibian

Theloderma phrynoderma is a species of frog in the family Rhacophoridae. It is endemic to Myanmar and known from two widely separated localities: Thao, its type locality in the Karen Hills in south-central Myanmar where it was collected by Leonardo Fea in 1888, and the Tanintharyi Nature Reserve in southern Myanmar near the Thai border where it was collected in 2009–2010. The common names Burmese bug-eyed frog, Burmese warted tree frog, and Tenasserim warty tree frog have been coined for it.

== Description ==
The holotype, an adult female, measures 45 mm (1.8 in) in snout–vent length, whereas three adult males all measure about 41 mm (1.6 in). The head is flat and triangular, shorter than it is wide. The tympanum is distinct and round. The fingers are long, with tips expanded into discs, and partially webbed (basal webbing between fingers I–II, increasing to nearly half-webbed between fingers III–IV). The toes are fully webbed and have discs that are slightly smaller than the finger discs. Dorsal skin is covered with calcified, white-tipped asperities, forming cluster especially near the tympana and along the dorsolateral region. Skin is cream colored and has brown blotches in the mid-dorsum. There is a dark brown bar between the eyes and a dark brown chevron between the shoulders. The flanks have cream-brown marbled pattern continuing onto the dorsum.

== Habitat and conservation ==
Theloderma phrynoderma occurs in both lowland and montane wet evergreen forest as well as evergreen mixed deciduous and bamboo forest at elevations of 59–2,400 m (194–7,874 ft) above sea level. Reproductive behaviour is unknown, but presumably this species deposits its eggs in small bodies of standing water, such as water-filled tree holes or rock depressions.

This species is known from few specimens, but it is not clear whether it is genuinely rare or simply difficult to detect. In general, its distribution area suffers from ongoing forest loss. The recently collected specimens are from a protected area (Tanintharyi Nature Reserve).
