= Theloderma lacustrinum =

Conservation status
- Data Deficient (IUCN 3.1)

Scientific classification
- Kingdom: Animalia
- Phylum: Chordata
- Class: Amphibia
- Order: Anura
- Family: Rhacophoridae
- Genus: Theloderma
- Species: T. lacustrinum

Binomial name
- Theloderma lacustrinum Sivongxay, Davankham, Phimmachak, Phoumixay, and Stuart, 2016

Species of frog

Theloderma lacustrinum, the lake bug-eyed frog, is a frog in the family Rhacophoridae. It is endemic to Laos. Scientists know it exclusively from the type locality: Ban Naxang Village near the Nam Lik Reservoir.

== Appearance ==
The adult male frog measures 17.0–20.6 mm in snout-vent length. The skin of the dorsum is light brown in color with brown and black marks. The frog's belly is gray. The iris of the eye is bronze in color. DNA analysis has indicated that this frog is related to Theloderma lateriticum.

== Habitat ==
This frog lives in mixed evergreen forests, near streams. It has been observed 292 and 361 meters above sea level. People have seen it perched on plants 30–80 cm above the ground. Scientists believe that during the drier, cooler part of the year, it spends more time in the lower canopy, where human observers are more likely to spot it.

== Life cycle ==
Scientists believe this frog breeds through larval development, like its congeners.

== Threats ==
The IUCN classifies this frog as data deficient. It does face some danger from deforestation associated with agriculture, logging, mining, and road construction. The creation of hydroelectric dams has altered the hydrology of the area. While frogs in Theloderma have been found in disturbed areas, scientists think this one is at least somewhat forest dependent.
