= Theloderma bicolor =

Conservation status
- Least Concern (IUCN 3.1)

Scientific classification
- Kingdom: Animalia
- Phylum: Chordata
- Class: Amphibia
- Order: Anura
- Family: Rhacophoridae
- Genus: Theloderma
- Species: T. bicolor

Binomial name
- Theloderma bicolor (Bourret, 1937)

Synonyms
- Rhacophorus leprosus bicolor Bourret, 1937; Rhacophorus bicolor — Inger, 1985

Species of frog

Theloderma bicolor is a species of frog in the family Rhacophoridae, sometimes known with common name Chapa bug-eyed frog. It is found in northwestern Vietnam from the Quang Tri Province northwards and in central and southeastern Yunnan (China). This frog has been observed between 1,400 and 1,800 meters (4,600 and 5,900 ft) above sea level.

This frog lives in evergreen forests with small to medium-sized trees and in mossy rainforests. They have also been observed in karst gorges, perched on plants next to streams.

This frog breeds in phytotelms, laying eggs above the waterline.

The IUCN classifies this frog as at least concern of extinction. What threat it faces comes from habitat loss associated with agriculture, logging, and hydroelectric dams. There is some issue with people capturing this frog to sell on the international pet trade, but they are also bred at the IEBR and WAZA Amphibian and Reptile Breeding Station.
