= Theloderma palliatum =

Cloaked moss frog

Conservation status
- Endangered (IUCN 3.1)

Scientific classification
- Kingdom: Animalia
- Phylum: Chordata
- Class: Amphibia
- Order: Anura
- Family: Rhacophoridae
- Genus: Theloderma
- Species: T. palliatum

Binomial name
- Theloderma palliatum Rowley, Le, Hoang, Dau, and Cao, 2011

Synonyms
- Theloderma chuyangsinense Orlov, Poyarkov, Vassilieva, Ananjeva, Nguyen, Sang, and Geissler, 2012

Species of frog

Theloderma palliatum (common name: cloaked moss frog) is a species of frog in the family Rhacophoridae. It is endemic to Vietnam and so far only known from the Bidoup Núi Bà and Chư Yang Sin National Parks. This species, together with Theloderma nebulosum, was first found by Australian and Vietnamese scientists in Tay Nguyen in 2011.

== Description ==
Adult males measure about 26 mm (1.0 in) in snout–vent length. An adult female, first described as a distinct species, Theloderma chuyangsinense, measures 28 mm (1.1 in) in snout–vent length. The body is relatively slender. The head is slightly longer than it is wide. The snout is bluntly truncate in dorsal view and truncate in profile. The tympanum is distinct. Both finger and toe discs are well-developed, but the finger discs are larger than the toes discs . The fingers are unwebbed whereas the toes have basal webbing. The dorsum is weakly rugose with sparsely scattered minute, pearly asperities. The ventral surface of thighs and belly are coarsely granular, while the chest and throat are smooth. In specimens from the Bidoup Núi Bà National Park, the dorsum is pale coppery brown with distinct dark warm brown markings, which are more distinct at night. The specimen from Chư Yang Sin National Park had pale-yellow to light straw-brown dorsum, with dark-brown blotches and spots of various sizes and shapes.

== Nomenclature ==
Scientists named this frog palliatus for the Latin word for "cloaked" or "in disguise," a reference to the frog's cryptic appearance.

== Habitat ==
Theloderma palliatum is known from montane evergreen forests at elevations of 1,500–2,000 m (4,900–6,600 ft) above sea level. Specimens have been recorded sitting on leaves 1–2 metres above ground and on the ground. Some specimens were collected near streams while others were found further away. It is rare in the Bidoup Núi Bà National Park, with only three specimens collected during 20 surveys conducted over a three-year period. However, the apparent rarity of the species could simply be caused by poor detectability associated with its small size and arboreal habits.

== Conservation ==
Habitat loss and modification, caused by aquaculture, agriculture (coffee), infrastructure, and harvest of forest products, are occurring inside the Bidoup Núi Bà National Park. As a consequence, this species is believed to be declining.

Scientists speculate that people might harvest this frog for the international pet trade, but it is so difficult to see with the naked eye that this may not be an issue.
