= Theloderma rhododiscus =

Conservation status
- Least Concern (IUCN 3.1)

Scientific classification
- Kingdom: Animalia
- Phylum: Chordata
- Class: Amphibia
- Order: Anura
- Family: Rhacophoridae
- Genus: Theloderma
- Species: T. rhododiscus

Binomial name
- Theloderma rhododiscus (Liu and Hu, 1962)

Synonyms
- Philautus rhododiscus

Species of frog

Theloderma rhododiscus is a species of frog in the family Rhacophoridae. It is found in China and Vietnam.

This frog lives in evergreen forests and appears to be forest-dependent. It lays eggs in ponds, pools, and water-filled holes in trees or bamboo. This frog has been observed 830 and 1711 meters above sea level.

The IUCN classifies this frog as least concern of extinction. What threat it faces is associated with agriculture and logging. The frog's range includes many well-managed protected parks.
