= Theloderma pyaukkya =

Conservation status
- Least Concern (IUCN 3.1)

Scientific classification
- Kingdom: Animalia
- Phylum: Chordata
- Class: Amphibia
- Order: Anura
- Family: Rhacophoridae
- Genus: Theloderma
- Species: T. pyaukkya

Binomial name
- Theloderma pyaukkya Dever, 2017

Species of frog

Theloderma pyaukkya, the Burmese camouflaged tree frog, Burmese warty tree frog or Burmese bug-eyed frog, is a species of frog in the family Rhacophoridae. It is native to China and western Myanmar.

== Appearance ==
The adult male frog measures about 28.0 to 31.5 mm in snout-vent length. The skin of the frog's dorsum is creamy or white in color. There are dark brown marks near its eyes. The toes of the front feet are red in color with tiny gold marks.

== Etymology ==
Scientists named this frog pyaukkya after the Burmese language word for "camouflage" because of the frog's cryptic coloration.

== Habitat and threats ==
This frog lives in montane and submontane forests. Scientists do not know its breeding habits but assume it probably lays eggs in water-filled holes in trees like other frogs in Theloderma do. This frog has been observed between 266 and 1338 meters above sea level.

The IUCN classifies this species as least concern of extinction. What threat it faces comes from deforestation, usually associated with agriculture.

The frog's range contains many protected parks, such as Indawgyi Wildlife Sanctuary.

== Original description ==
- Dever JA (2017). "A new cryptic species of the Theloderma asperum Complex (Anura: Rhacophoridae) from Myanmar". Journal of Herpetology. 51: 425–436.
