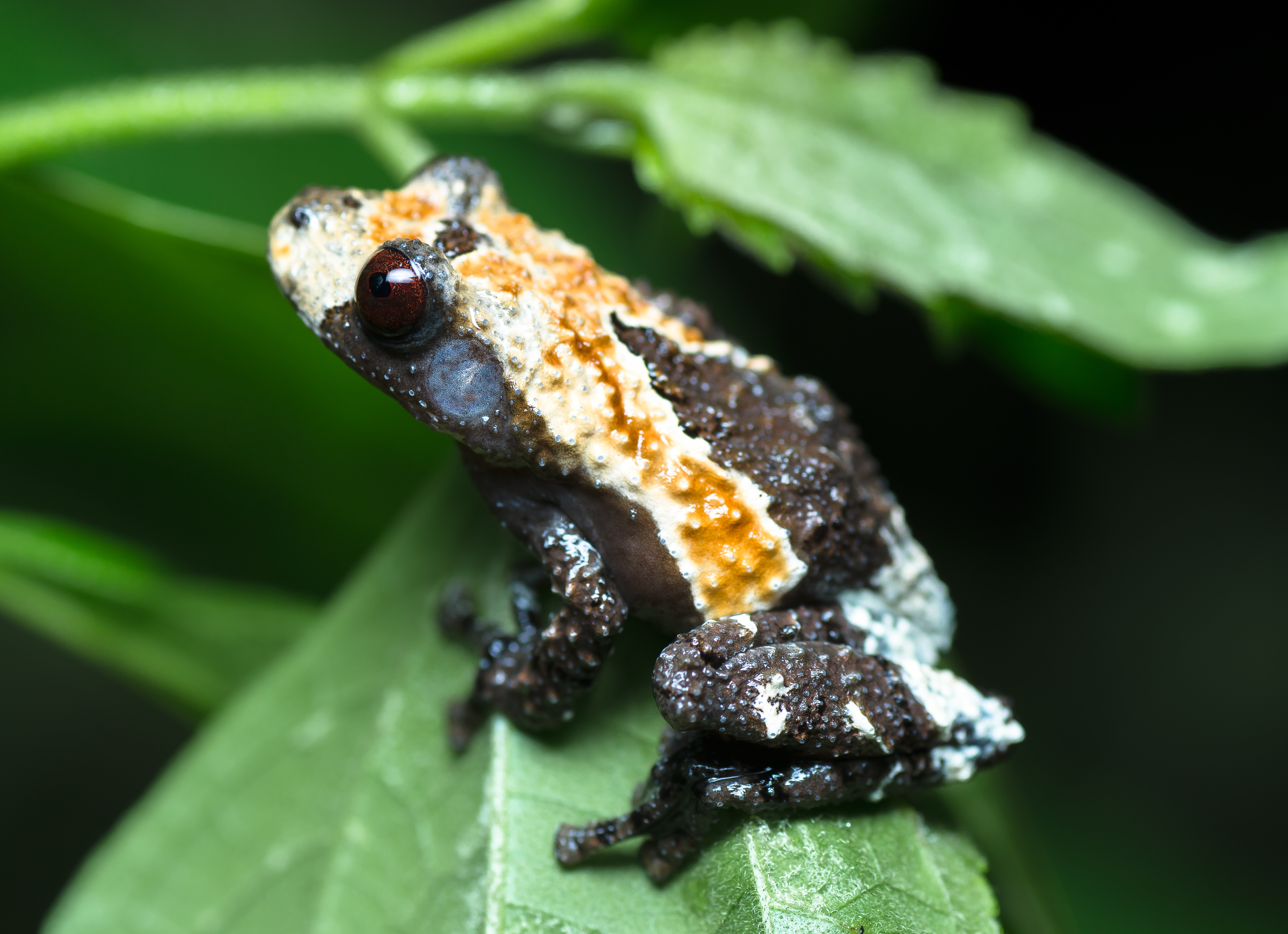
- Theloderma albopunctatum

Scientific classification
- Domain: Eukaryota
- Kingdom: Animalia
- Phylum: Chordata
- Class: Amphibia
- Order: Anura
- Family: Rhacophoridae
- Subfamily: Rhacophorinae
- Genus: Theloderma; Tschudi, 1838

Type species
- Theloderma leporosa Tschudi, 1838

Diversity
- See text

= Theloderma =

Genus of amphibians

Theloderma, the bug-eyed frogs, mossy frogs or warty frogs, is a genus of frogs in the family Rhacophoridae, subfamily Rhacophorinae. They are found from northeastern India and southern China, through Southeast Asia, to the Greater Sunda Islands; the highest species richness is in Indochina. Some species, especially T. corticale, are sometimes kept in captivity.

They are medium to small-sized frogs with maximum snout–vent lengths that range from 2 to 7.5 cm (0.8 to 3.0 in) depending on species, and their skin can be smooth, warty or tuberculated. The genus includes species that are contrastingly marked, but most are very well-camouflaged, resembling plant material (typically bark or moss) or bird droppings.

Little is known about their behavior, but they feed on small arthropods. In species where known, breeding takes place in a small water pool in a cavity of a tree, bamboo or karst. The female places 4–20 eggs just above the water. After about one to two weeks they hatch into tadpoles that drop into the water; they metamorphose into froglets after a few months to a year.

== Species and taxonomy ==
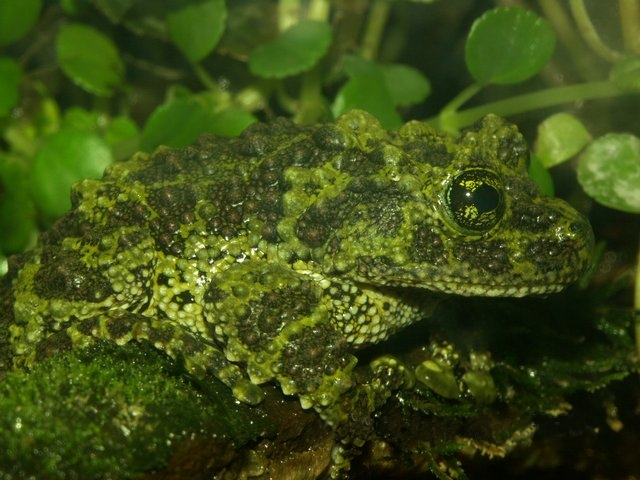
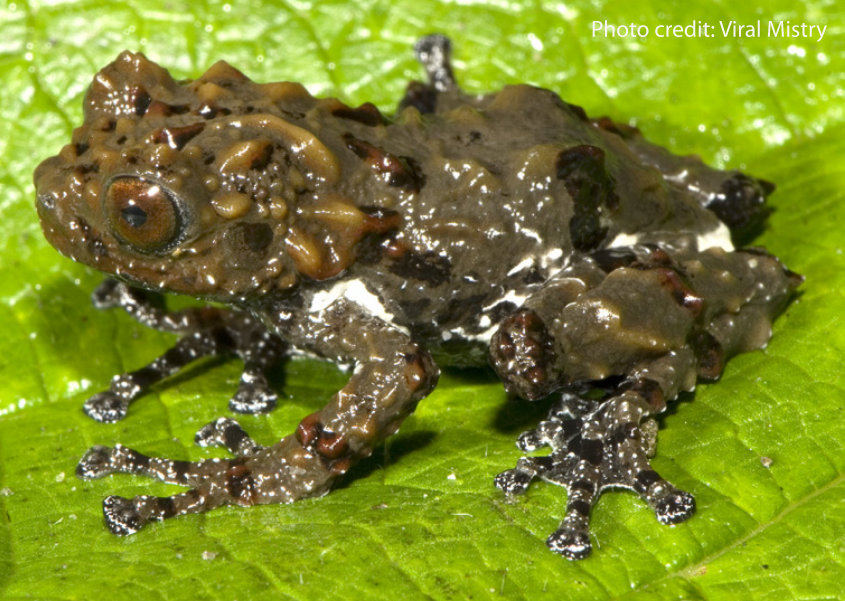
T. corticale (above) resembles moss and T. moloch (below) resembles bark or a bird dropping

The sister taxon of Theloderma is Nyctixalus. The taxonomy of this genus and Nyctixalus as well as Theloderma moloch has been in flux; today both AmphibiaWeb and Amphibian Species of the World recognize the two genera as valid.

Following the Amphibian Species of the World, there are 26 recognized species in the genus Theloderma:

- Theloderma albopunctatum (Liu and Hu, 1962)
- Theloderma annae Nguyen, Pham, Nguyen, Ngo, and Ziegler, 2016
- Theloderma asperum (Boulenger, 1886)
- Theloderma auratum Poyarkov, Kropachev, Gogoleva, and Orlov, 2018
- Theloderma baibungense (Jiang, Fei, and Huang, 2009)
- Theloderma bicolor (Bourret, 1937)
- Theloderma corticale (Boulenger, 1903)
- Theloderma gordoni Taylor, 1962
- Theloderma horridum (Boulenger, 1903)
- Theloderma khoii Ninh, Nguyen, Nguyen, Hoang, Siliyavong, Nguyen, Le, Le & Ziegler, 2022
- Theloderma lacustrinum Sivongxay, Davankham, Phimmachak, Phoumixay, and Stuart, 2016
- Theloderma laeve (Smith, 1924)
- Theloderma lateriticum Bain, Nguyen, and Doan, 2009
- Theloderma leporosum Tschudi, 1838
- Theloderma licin McLeod and Norhayati, 2007
- Theloderma moloch (Annandale, 1912)
- Theloderma nagalandense Orlov, Dutta, Ghate, and Kent, 2006
- Theloderma nebulosum Rowley, Le, Hoang, Dau, and Cao, 2011
- Theloderma palliatum Rowley, Le, Hoang, Dau, and Cao, 2011
- Theloderma petilum (Stuart and Heatwole, 2004)
- Theloderma phrynoderma (Ahl, 1927)
- Theloderma pyaukkya Dever, 2017
- Theloderma rhododiscus (Liu and Hu, 1962)
- Theloderma ryabovi Orlov, Dutta, Ghate, and Kent, 2006
- Theloderma stellatum Taylor, 1962
- Theloderma truongsonense (Orlov and Ho, 2005)
- Theloderma vietnamense Poyarkov, Orlov, Moiseeva, Pawangkhanant, Ruangsuwan, Vassilieva, Galoyan, Nguyen, and Gogoleva, 2015
