= Theloderma auratum =

Conservation status
- Vulnerable (IUCN 3.1)

Scientific classification
- Kingdom: Animalia
- Phylum: Chordata
- Class: Amphibia
- Order: Anura
- Family: Rhacophoridae
- Genus: Theloderma
- Species: T. auratum

Binomial name
- Theloderma auratum Poyarkov, Kropachev, Gogoleva, and Orlov, 2018

Species of frog

Theloderma auratum, the golden bug-eyed frog, is a species of frog in the family Rhacophoridae. It is endemic to Vietnam and predicted in Laos. It has been recorded in montane tropical forest habitats.

== Description ==
The adult male frog measures about 21.8–26.4 mm in snout-vent length. It has no warts on the skin of the dorsum or bony ridges on its heas. There is no webbed skin on its front feet. The skin of its back is gold-yellow in color with gold-orange and brown marks. The skin of its legs is reddish brown on the dorsal side.

== Habitat ==
This frog lives in submontane evergreen primary forest, and it has not been observed in disturbed habitats. People see the frogs after heavy rains, perched on plants up to one meter above the ground. This frog has been observed between 800 and 1420 meters above sea level.

== Etymology ==
Scientists named this frog auratum for the Latin language word for "gold."

== Life cycle ==
The male frog calls to the female frog. Scientists believe this species may be a phytotelm breeder. In captivity, the tadpoles take about two and a half months to mature.

== Threats ==
The IUCN classifies this frog as vulnerable to extinction because of deforestation in favor of agriculture.

The frog's range includes at least two protected parks: Kon Chu Rang Nature Reserve and Kon Ka Kinh National Park.
