= Theloderma petilum =

Conservation status
- Vulnerable (IUCN 3.1)

Scientific classification
- Kingdom: Animalia
- Phylum: Chordata
- Class: Amphibia
- Order: Anura
- Family: Rhacophoridae
- Genus: Theloderma
- Species: T. petilum

Binomial name
- Theloderma petilum (Stuart and Heatwole, 2004)

Synonyms
- Philautus petilus Stuart and Heatwole, 2004; Theloderma (Theloderma) petilum (Stuart and Heatwole, 2004)

Species of amphibian

Theloderma petilus, the slender warted tree frog or slender bug-eyed frog, is a frog in the family Rhacophoridae. It occurs in Vietnam, where it has been observed in the Muong Nhe Nature Reserve. It is also native to Laos and Thailand. Scientists think it may live in China.

== Appearance ==
The holotype adult frog was found to measure 33.8 mm long in snout-vent length. The skin of the dorsum is soft yellow-brown in color with interrupted black stripes. There is some lavendar color on the dorsal surfaces of all four legs and a black canthal stripe on each side.

== Home ==
This frog lives in mixed bamboo and evergreen forests on hills between 20 and 600 meters above sea level. It has only been observed in forests. People have seen the frogs on plants about 1 meter above the ground.

== Young ==
Scientists infer that this frog breeds through larval development, like other frogs in Theloderma.

== Threats ==
The IUCN classifies this frog as vulnerable to extinction because of its limited range, which is subject to ongoing habitat degradation, largely deforestation in favor of agriculture. This frog's range includes at least two protected parks: Phou Dendin National Biodiversity Conservation Area and Muong Nhe Nature Reserve.
