= Theloderma ryabovi =

Conservation status
- Endangered (IUCN 3.1)

Scientific classification
- Kingdom: Animalia
- Phylum: Chordata
- Class: Amphibia
- Order: Anura
- Family: Rhacophoridae
- Genus: Theloderma
- Species: T. ryabovi

Binomial name
- Theloderma ryabovi Orlov, Dutta, Ghate, and Kent, 2006

Synonyms
- Theloderma (Theloderma) ryabovi Orlov, Dutta, Ghate, and Kent, 2006

Species of frog

Theloderma ryabovi, or Ryabov's bug-eyed frog, is a species of frog in the family Rhacophoridae. It is endemic to Vietnam. Scientists know it from the type locality.

This frog lives in montane primary forests, where it has been observed 1210 meters above sea level. People have seen this frog perched about 4 m above the ground. This frog breeds in phytotelmas. Male frogs and tadpoles and metamorphs in various stages of development have been observed sharing the same water-filled tree hole.

The IUCN classifies this frog as endangered because of its small range, which is subject to considerable habitat degradation, especially associated with cash crop cultivation. Road construction is also an issue.

A Ryabov's bug-eyed frog at a reptile show in Las Vegas.
