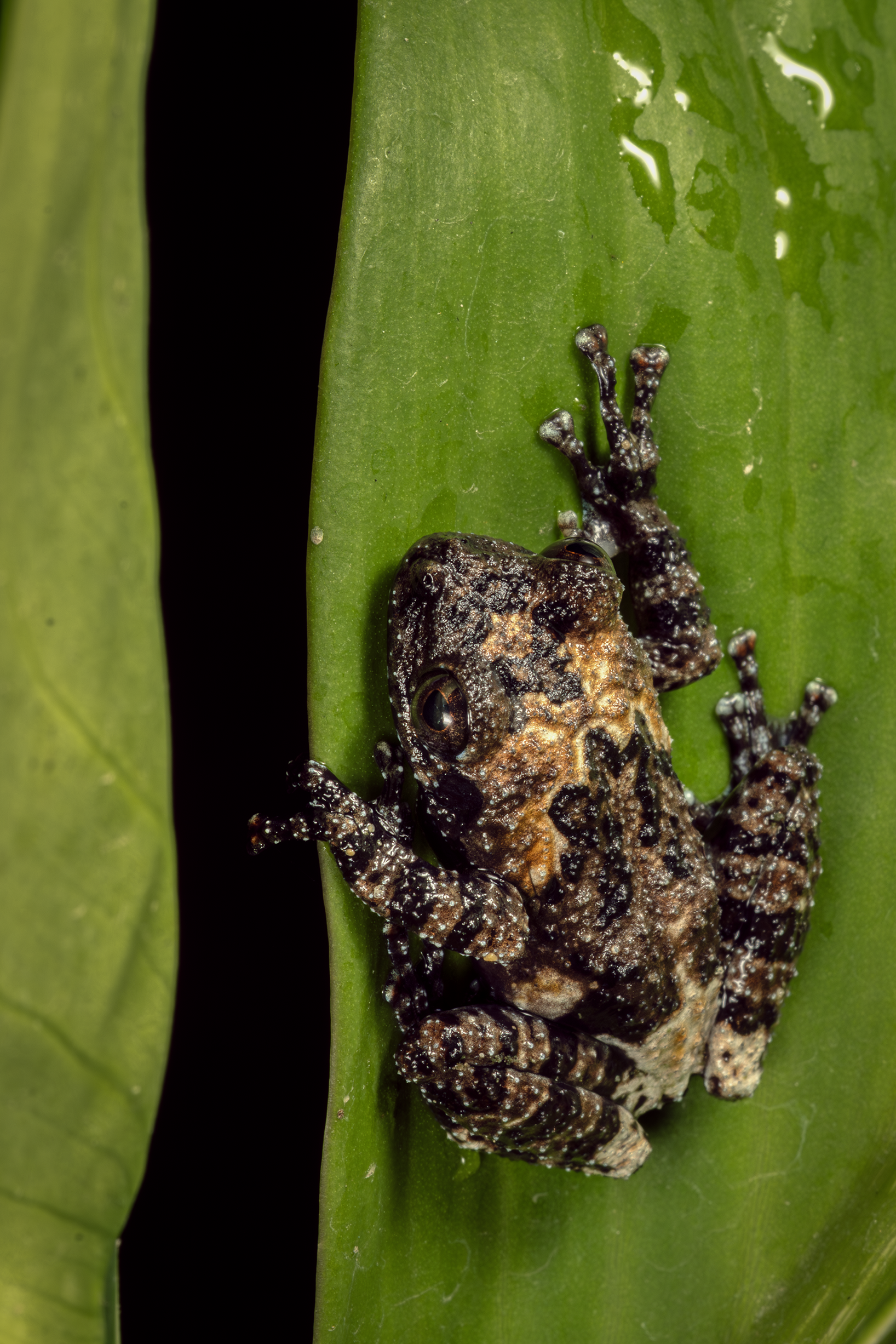

Conservation status
- Least Concern (IUCN 3.1)

Scientific classification
- Kingdom: Animalia
- Phylum: Chordata
- Class: Amphibia
- Order: Anura
- Family: Rhacophoridae
- Genus: Theloderma
- Species: T. vietnamense

Binomial name
- Theloderma vietnamense Poyarkov, Orlov, Moiseeva, Pawangkhanant, Ruangsuwan, Vassilieva, Galoyan, Nguyen, and Gogoleva, 2015

Synonyms
- Theloderma (Stelladerma) vietnamense Poyarkov, Orlov, Moiseeva, Pawangkhanant, Ruangsuwan, Vassilieva, Galoyan, Nguyen, and Gogoleva, 2015

= Theloderma vietnamense =

Species of frog

Theloderma vietnamense, the South Vietnamese bug-eyed frog or South Vietnamese bug eye frog, is a frog in the family Rhacophoridae. It is endemic to Vietnam, Cambodia, and Laos. It has been observed no higher than 1400 meters above sea level.

This frog has been found in dense, mixed evergreen-deciduous forests in lowlands, hills, and montane habitats. This frog has occasionally been observed in secondary forest. This frog is closely associated with water-filled holes in trees, which they use to breed and sometimes shelter during the day.

During the breeding season, the male frogs perch on plants near the tree holes and call to the female frogs. The female frogs enter the tree holes and lay eggs above the waterline. When the eggs hatch, the tadpoles fall into the water. Two or three female frogs may lay eggs in the same hole with the same male frog.

The IUCN does name some threats to this frog, mostly associated with habitat loss associated with agriculture, especially for cash crops like rubber, coffee, and tea. They also believe people may collect this frog to sell in the international trade because that has happened to similarly beautiful frogs.

The frog's range includes many protected parks, including Phu Quoc National Park, Nui Ong Nature Reserve, Vinh Cuu Nature Reserve, Kon Ka Kinh Nature Reserve, Kon Cha Rang Nature Reserve, Dong Nai Bioshpere Reserve, and others.

== Original description ==
- Poyarkov Jr NA; Orlov NL; Moiseeva AV; Pawangkhanant P; Ruangsuwan T; Vassilieva AB; Galoyan EA; Nguyen TT; Gogleva SS (2015). "Sorting out moss frogs: mtDNA data on taxonomic diversity and phylogenetic relationships of the Indochinese species of the genus Theloderma (Anura, Rhacoporidae)". Russian J Herpetology. 22 (4): 241–280 – via ResearchGate.
