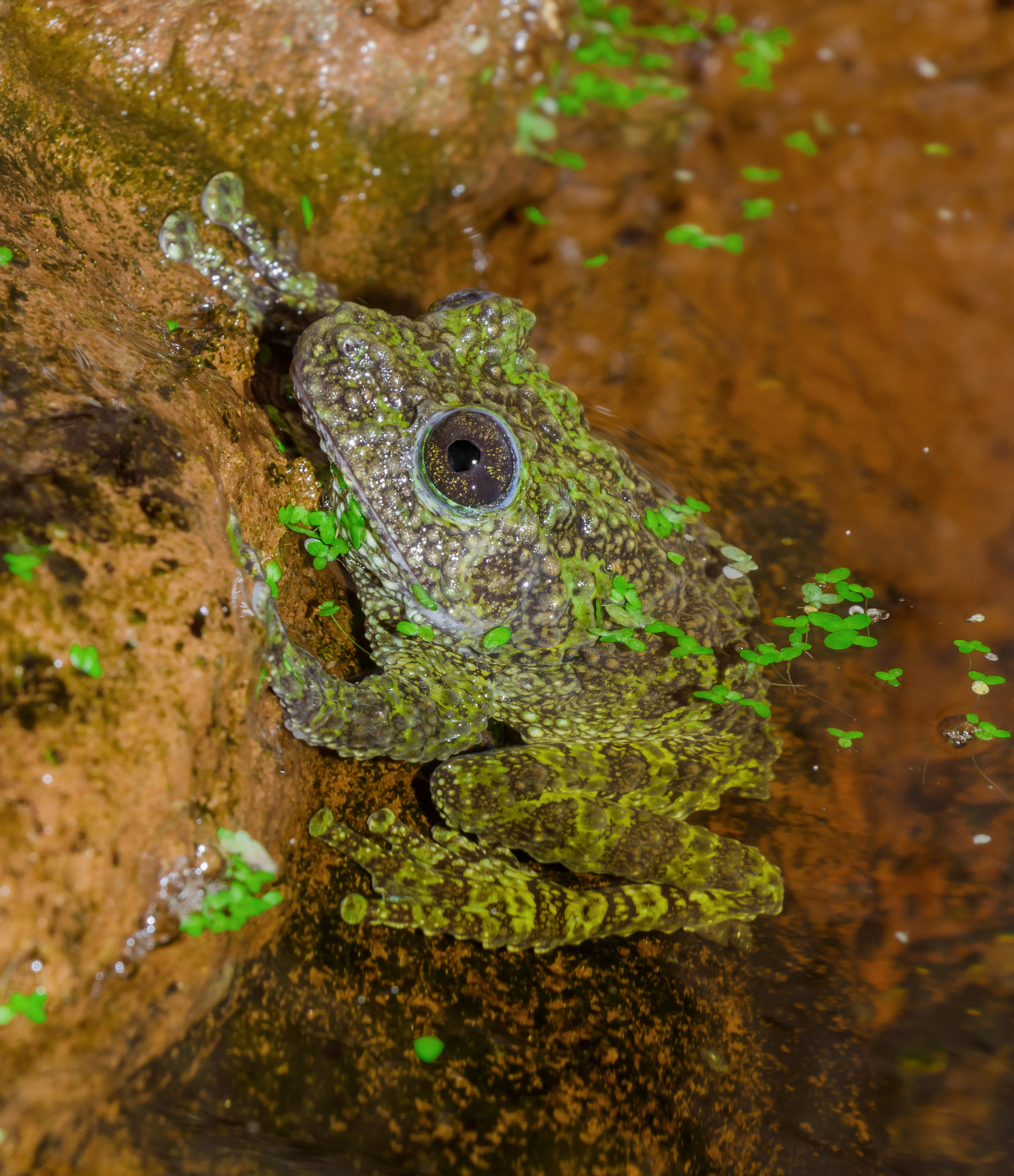

Conservation status
- Least Concern (IUCN 3.1)

Scientific classification
- Kingdom: Animalia
- Phylum: Chordata
- Class: Amphibia
- Order: Anura
- Family: Rhacophoridae
- Genus: Theloderma
- Species: T. corticale

Binomial name
- Theloderma corticale (Boulenger, 1903)

Synonyms
- Rhacophorus corticalis Boulenger, 1903; Rhacophorus fruhstorferi Ahl, 1927; Theloderma kwangsiense (Liu and Hu, 1962); Rhacophorus leprosus ssp. kwangsiensis Liu and Hu, 1962; Theloderma leporosa ssp. kwangsiensis (Liu and Hu, 1962)

= Theloderma corticale =

Species of frog

Theloderma corticale (common names: mossy frog, Vietnamese mossy frog, Tonkin bug-eyed frog, moss bug-eyed frog, and [for the formerly recognized Theloderma kwangsiense] Kwangsi warty treefrog) is a species of frog in the family Rhacophoridae. It is now known to be found in northern Vietnam, south–central Laos, and southern China (Guangdong, Guangxi, Hainan, Yunnan).

== Description ==
The common name "mossy frog" arises from the fact that its skin is a mottled green and brown that resembles moss growing on rock, and provides an effective form of camouflage. They have large sticky pads on their toes and a soft underbelly. They measure about 61 mm (2.4 in) in snout–vent length. The females will grow larger than the males and can reach sizes of 8–9 cm (3.1–3.5 in). This species will curl into a ball when frightened, and play dead.

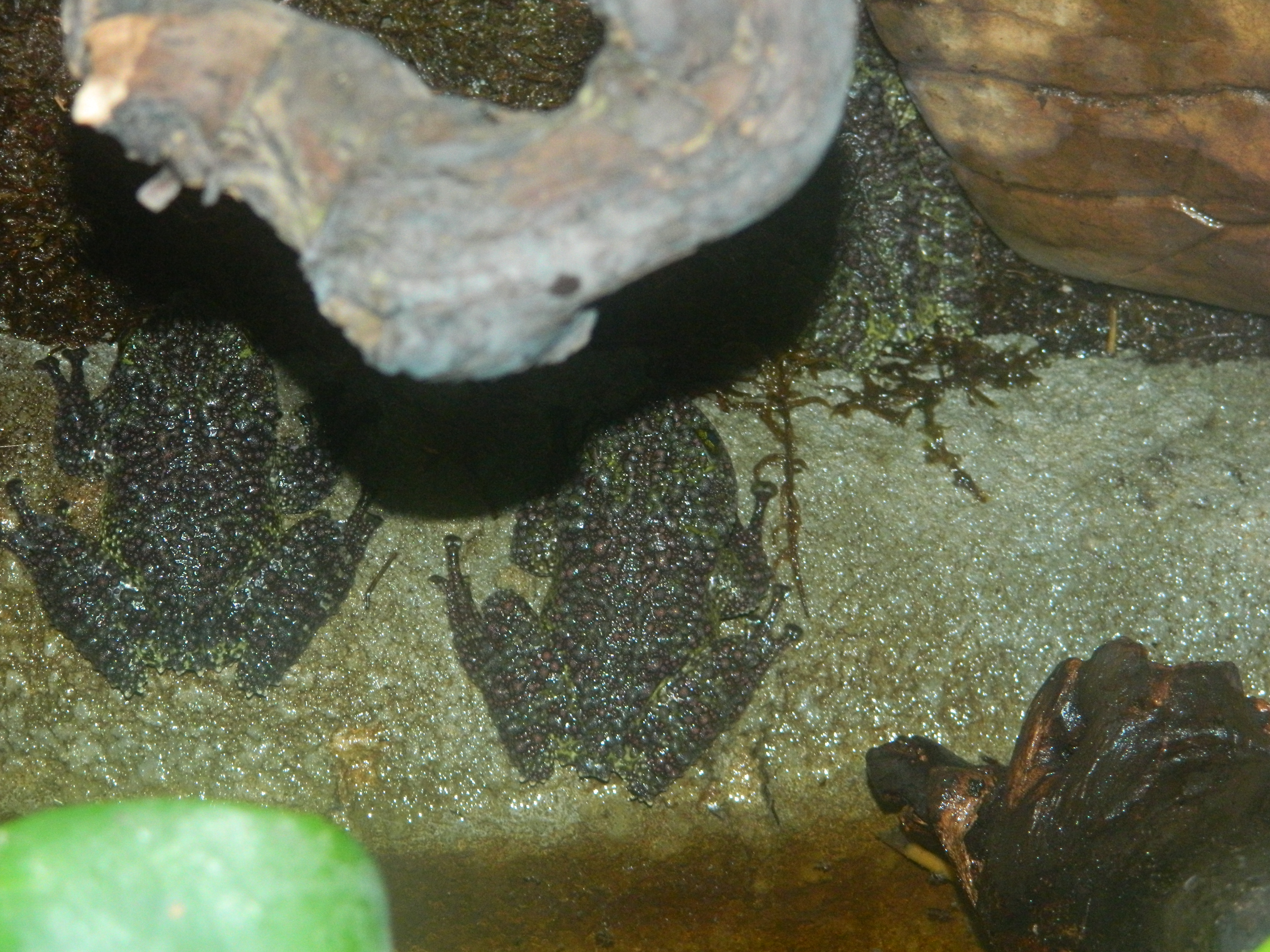
Three individuals camouflaged on a rock face

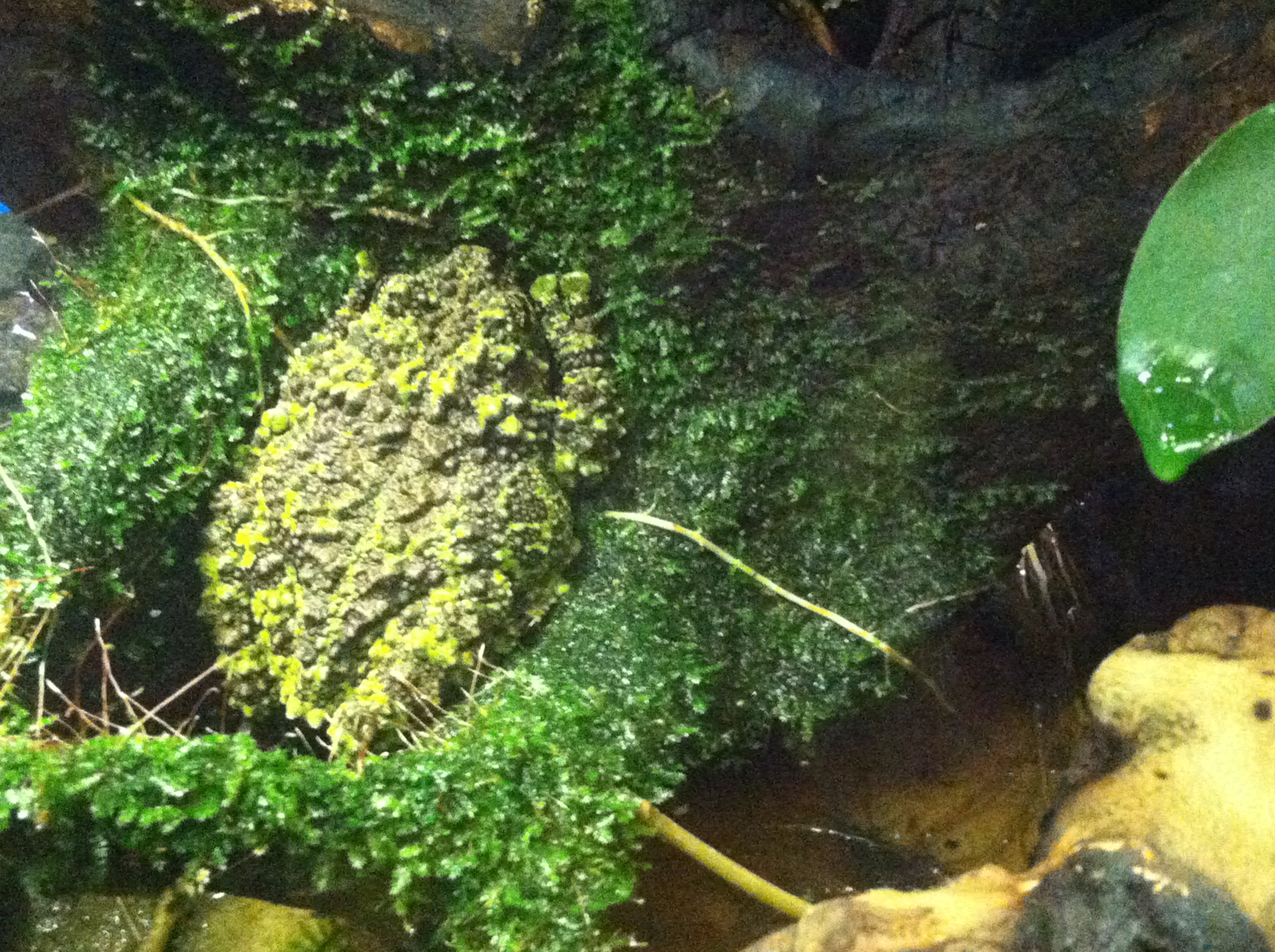
An individual camouflaged on a mossy surface

== Habitat ==
Its natural habitats are primarily evergreen rainforests and subtropical forest where they have been found inside pools in hollowed-out logs, placed by the local villagers. The Vietnamese mossy frog is semi-aquatic and found in caves and steep rocky cliffs. This amphibian has been observed between 470 and 1500 meters above sea level. Breeding takes place in rock cavities or tree hollows above water sources. When the eggs hatch into tadpoles, the tadpoles fall into the water below and mainly eat tiny water dwelling larvae.

== Diet ==
Its diet consists of crickets, cockroaches, and earthworms.

== Pet trade ==
T. corticale or also known as vietnamese mossy frogs are also able to live in captivity to up to 20 years. However they are quite hard to breed with the keeper having to simulate wet and dry seasons. After the adult frog lays eggs the tadpoles that hatch will have their gender assigned depending on the temperature of the water

== Conservation ==
Its habitat is threatened by forest loss. It is also collected for the international pet trade. Like many amphibians, the Vietnamese mossy frog is vulnerable to the chytrid fungus Batrachochytrium dendrobatidis. Nonetheless, the conservation of this species is classified as "Least Concern" by the International Union for Conservation of Nature.
