= Theloderma khoii =

Scientific classification
- Kingdom: Animalia
- Phylum: Chordata
- Class: Amphibia
- Order: Anura
- Family: Rhacophoridae
- Genus: Theloderma
- Species: T. khoii

Binomial name
- Theloderma khoii Ninh, Nguyen, Nguyen, Hoang, Siliyavong, Nguyen, Le, Le, and Ziegler, 2022

Species of frog

Theloderma khoii, or Khoi's mossy frog, is a species of frog in the family Rhacophoridae. It is endemic to northern Vietnam and southern China's Yunnan Province. It has been observed between 1320 and 1750 meters above sea level in Vietnam and about 1600 meters above sea level in China.

The dorsal side of Theloderma khoii is green or olive with mossy markings, which makes it easy to identify from other Theloderma species. The Theloderma khoii may blend in amazingly well with the background of stones covered in lichens or tree leaves thanks to its moss-green coloring on the dorsal side.

The adult male frog measures about 52.1 mm in snout-vent length and the adult female frog is about 59.4 mm long. The skin on the frog's back has numerous wart. It is mossy green to olive green in color, mottled with some magenta.
