= Theloderma laeve =

Conservation status
- Least Concern (IUCN 3.1)

Scientific classification
- Kingdom: Animalia
- Phylum: Chordata
- Class: Amphibia
- Order: Anura
- Family: Rhacophoridae
- Genus: Theloderma
- Species: T. laeve

Binomial name
- Theloderma laeve (Smith, 1924)

Synonyms
- Philautus laevis Smith, 1924; Chirixalus laevis (Smith, 1924); Chiromantis laevis (Smith, 1924); Theloderma bambusicolum Orlov et al., 2012

Species of frog

Theloderma laeve is a species of frog in the family Rhacophoridae. As currently known, it is endemic to central and southern Vietnam, although its true range could well extend into adjacent eastern Cambodia and perhaps Laos. It occurs in tropical forest at elevations of 126–1,450 m (413–4,757 ft) above sea level. Individuals have been spotted in bamboo bushes and rattan palms.

These frogs breed in May, with calling males gathering at great density. These frogs breed through larval development, with free-swimming tadpoles developing in streams.

The IUCN classifies this as at least concern of extinction because of its large range. What threat it faces comes from deforestation associated with agriculture, especially cash crops, such as coffee, rubber, and tea.

The frog's range includes protected parks in more than one country: Bidoup Nui Ba National Park, Bu Gia Map National Park, Bach Ma National Park, Song Thanh Nature Reserve, Kon Cha Rang Nature Reserve, Ea So Nature Reserve, and Ngoc Linh Nature Reserve.
