= Theloderma nebulosum =

Conservation status
- Endangered (IUCN 3.1)

Scientific classification
- Kingdom: Animalia
- Phylum: Chordata
- Class: Amphibia
- Order: Anura
- Family: Rhacophoridae
- Genus: Theloderma
- Species: T. nebulosum

Binomial name
- Theloderma nebulosum Rowley, Le, Hoang, Dau, and Cao, 2011

Species of amphibian

Theloderma nebulosum, the misty moss frog, is a species of frogs in the family Rhacophoridae. It is endemic to central Vietnam and currently only known from Ngọc Linh Nature Reserve in the Kon Tum Province. Only one female and a series of tadpoles collected in 2009–2010 are known. This species, together with Theloderma palliatum, was described by Australian and Vietnamese scientists in 2011.

== Description ==
The holotype, an adult female, measures 29 mm (1.1 in) in snout–vent length. The body is relatively robust. The head is as wide as it is long. The snout is bluntly truncate in dorsal view but rounded in profile. The tympanum is distinct. The finger and toe discs are well-developed, with the finger discs being larger than those on the toes. The fingers are unwebbed whereas the toes have basal webbing. The dorsum is brown with indistinct darker brown longitudinal markings; these were more marked upon capture at night. The dorsolateral surfaces of body are paler brown and slightly mottled. The iris is bicoloured, having pale gold in upper third and dark red further down.

The series of eight tadpoles measured 6–13 mm (0.24–0.51 in) in body length. Tail more than doubles the length.

== Habitat and conservation ==
Theloderma nebulosum has been found in high-elevation montane evergreen and bamboo forest at elevations of about 1,950–2,000 m (6,400–6,560 ft) above sea level. It is arboreal. The tadpoles were found inside a small water-filled tree hollow some 1 m above the ground.

This species is still known only from one female and a series of tadpoles. This probably reflects the arboreal habits, small size, and cryptic colouration of the species, as well as limited survey effort in the area. The known specimens were collected inside a nature reserve, but outside the reserve habitat loss and degradation are threats.
