= Theloderma truongsonense =

Conservation status
- Least Concern (IUCN 3.1)

Scientific classification
- Kingdom: Animalia
- Phylum: Chordata
- Class: Amphibia
- Order: Anura
- Family: Rhacophoridae
- Genus: Theloderma
- Species: T. truongsonense

Binomial name
- Theloderma truongsonense (Orlov and Ho, 2005)

Synonyms
- Philautus truongsonensis Orlov and Ho, 2005; Theloderma (Theloderma) truongsonense (Orlov and Ho, 2005)

Species of frog

Theloderma truongsonense, the Truong Son bug-eyed frog, is a species of frog in the family Rhacophoridae. It is endemic to Vietnam and Laos. It has been observed between 300 and 1300 meters above sea level.

This frog lives in forests on mountains. It has been observed in mountain streams.

The female frog lays 5–12 eggs per clutch on leaves. People have seen the tadpoles swimming in water inside hollow tree trunks.

The IUCN classifies this frog as at least concern of extinction because of its large range. But it does face some threat from habitat loss associated with agriculture, especially for cash crops like coffee, rubber, and tea. The frog's range includes some protected parks: Bach Ma National Park, Phong Nha - Ke Bang National Park, Hon Ba Nature Reserve, and Bac Huong Hoa Nature Reserve.

== Original description ==
- Orlov N. L.; Ho T. C. (2013). "A new species of Philautus from Vietnam (Anura: Rhacophoridae)". Russ. J. Herpetol. (Abstract). 12 (2): 135–142. doi:10.30906/1026-2296-2005-12-2-135-142 (inactive 12 July 2025). S2CID 220661565.
