= Theloderma annae =

Conservation status
- Data Deficient (IUCN 3.1)

Scientific classification
- Kingdom: Animalia
- Phylum: Chordata
- Class: Amphibia
- Order: Anura
- Family: Rhacophoridae
- Genus: Theloderma
- Species: T. annae

Binomial name
- Theloderma annae Nguyen, Pham, Nguyen, Ngo, and Ziegler, 2016

Species of frog

Theloderma annae, Anna's bug-eyed frog or Anna's mossy frog, is a species of frog in the family Rhacophoridae. It is endemic to Vietnam. It has been observed in the Ngoc Son–Ngo Luong Nature Reserve and Cúc Phương National Park.

== Description ==
The adult male frog measures about 27.1–28.5 mm in snout-vent length and the adult female frog about 30.3–32.6 mm. The skin of the dorsum is gray-green in color. The throat, belly, flanks, and parts of the legs are brown with white spots.

== Habitat ==
This frog lives in limestone karst forests, where it has been seen near caves, near cliffs, and in rocky valleys between 67 and 650 meters above sea level. It has been observed far from water sources. It seems to survive well in secondary forest.

Scientists have not yet described the frog's tadpoles, but they infer that the frogs breed through larval development, like other frogs in Theloderma.

== Threats ==
The IUCN classifies this frog as data deficient but it does seem to be in some danger from habitat loss, largely associated with agriculture, quarrying, and logging. This frog has also appeared on the international pet trade, but scientists do not know if this poses a danger to the species.

The frog's known range includes protected parks: Ngo Luong-Ngoc Son Nature Reserve, Trang An Landscape Complex, and Cúc Phương National Park.
