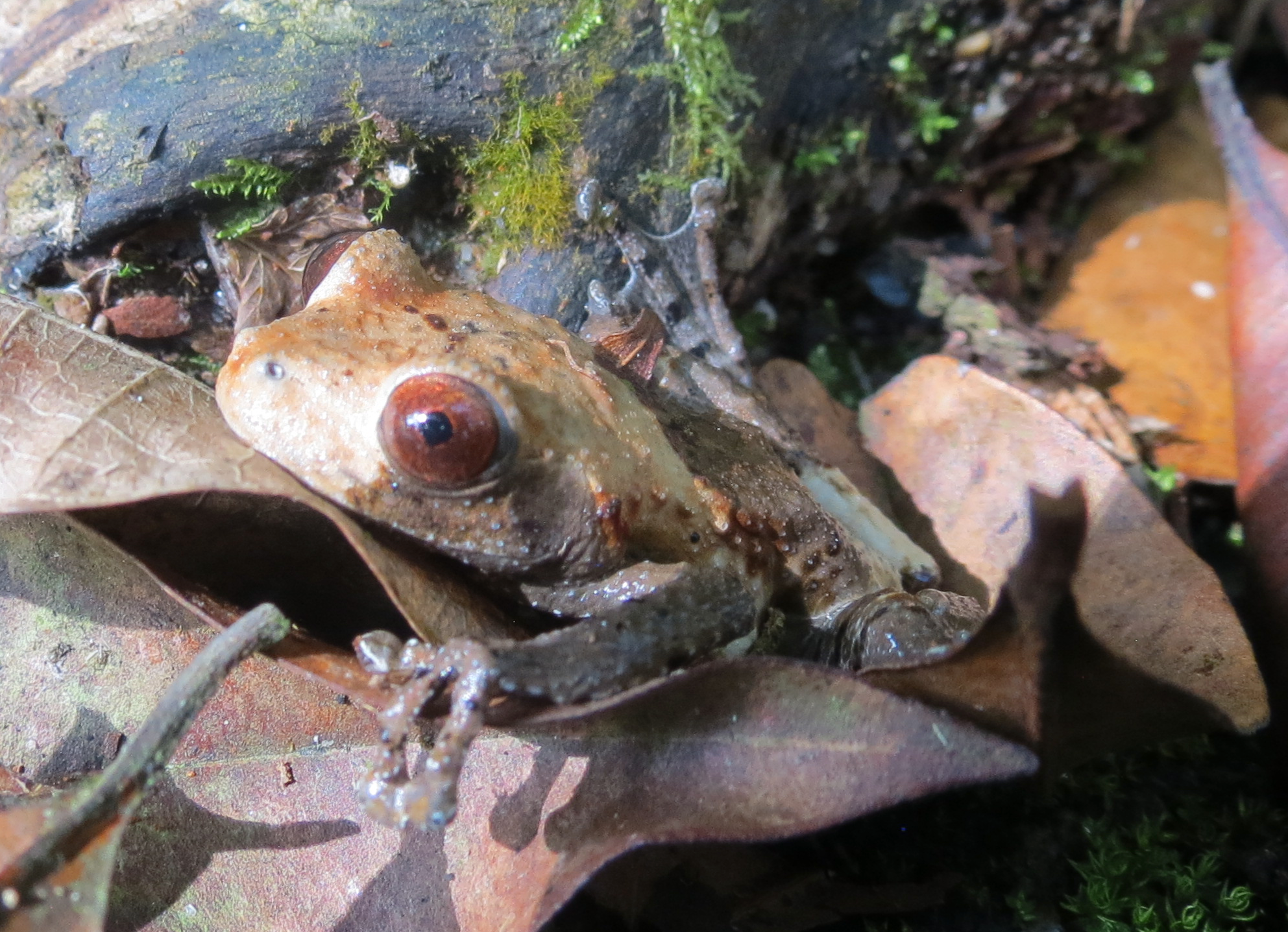

Conservation status
- Least Concern (IUCN 3.1)

Scientific classification
- Kingdom: Animalia
- Phylum: Chordata
- Class: Amphibia
- Order: Anura
- Family: Rhacophoridae
- Genus: Theloderma
- Species: T. asperum

Binomial name
- Theloderma asperum (Boulenger, 1886)

Synonyms
- Ixalus asper Boulenger, 1886; Rhacophorus asperrimus Ahl, 1927 Philautus albopunctatus Liu and Hu, 1962

= Theloderma asperum =

Species of amphibian

Theloderma asperum is a frog in the family Rhacophoridae. It is also known as the pied warty frog, hill garden bug-eyed frog, or somewhat informally, bird poop frog. The frog can be found in the northeastern India, Bangladesh, Bhutan, Burma, China (Tibet, possibly more widely), Thailand, Cambodia, and Vietnam as well as Sumatra in Indonesia. However, because of confusion with Theloderma albopunctatum and Theloderma baibungense, it is known with certainty from its type locality in Peninsular Malaysia.

== Description ==
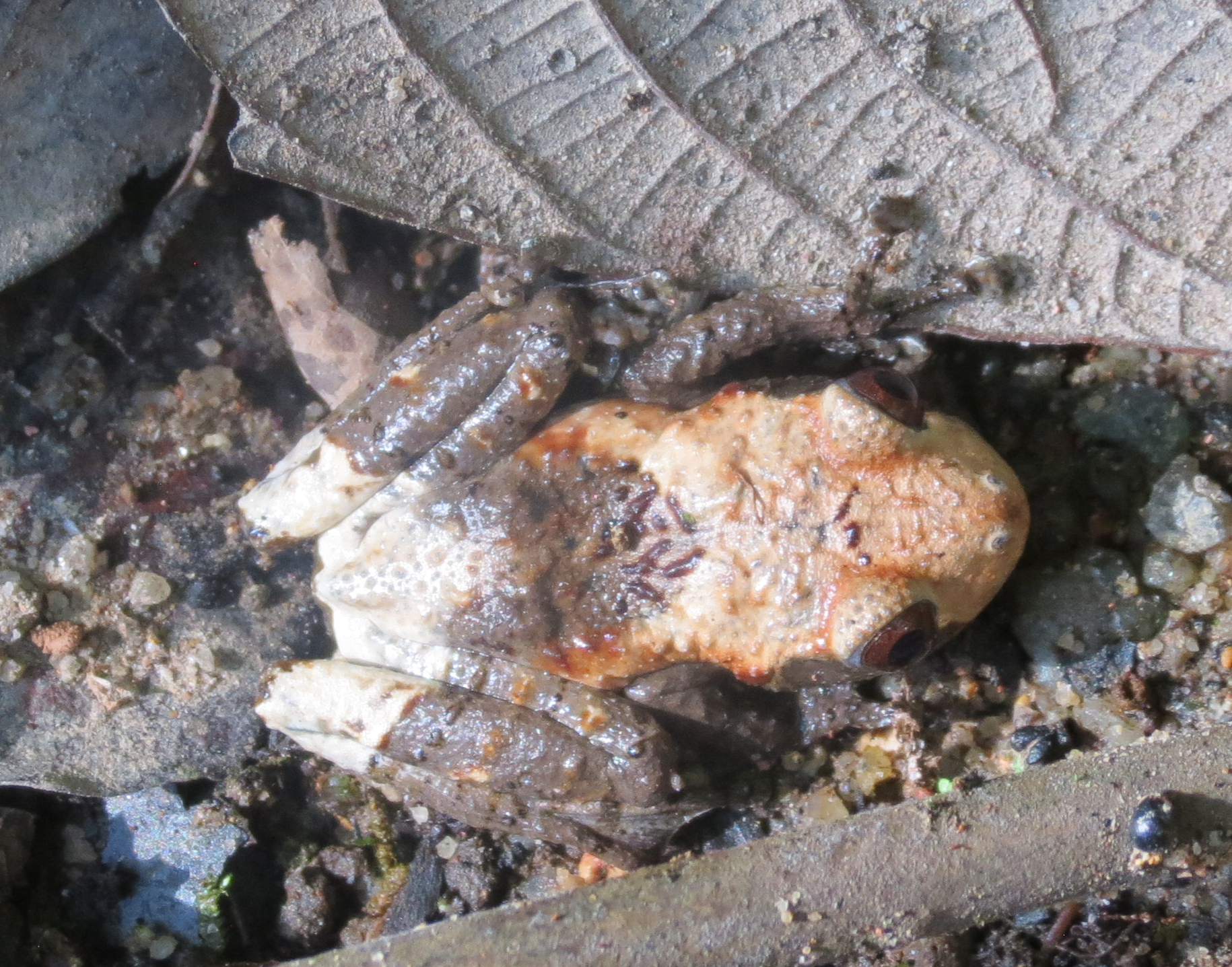
Theloderma asperum found on Fraser's Hill

This frog is 25–35 mm long in snout-vent length. The skin of the dorsum is black with white warts, causing the frog to resemble bird droppings. It has disks on its toes for climbing. The frog has dark red eyes.

Unlike other frogs in Theloderma, this frog does not have vomerine teeth.

== Young ==
This frog breeds in water-filled tree holes, in pools of rainwater, and in other water-filled objects.

The tadpoles are gray in color.

== Habitat ==
Theloderma asperum is a tree bark mimic that breeds in tree holes. It lives in tropical and subtropical submontane forests, where they have been found perched on short plants and tree stumps. The frog is cryptic and hard for people to spot, but scientists think it spends a great deal of time in water-filled holes in trees. The frog has been observed between 0 and 1400 meters above sea level.

The frog's range includes protected parks.

== Threats ==
Scientists say this frog is not in danger of dying out because of its large range and presumed large population. What threat it faces comes from the loss of its forest habitat via logging.

== Original description ==
- Boulenger, G. A. (1886). "First report on additions to the batrachian collection in the Natural-History Museum". Proceedings of the Zoological Society of London. 1886: 411–416.
