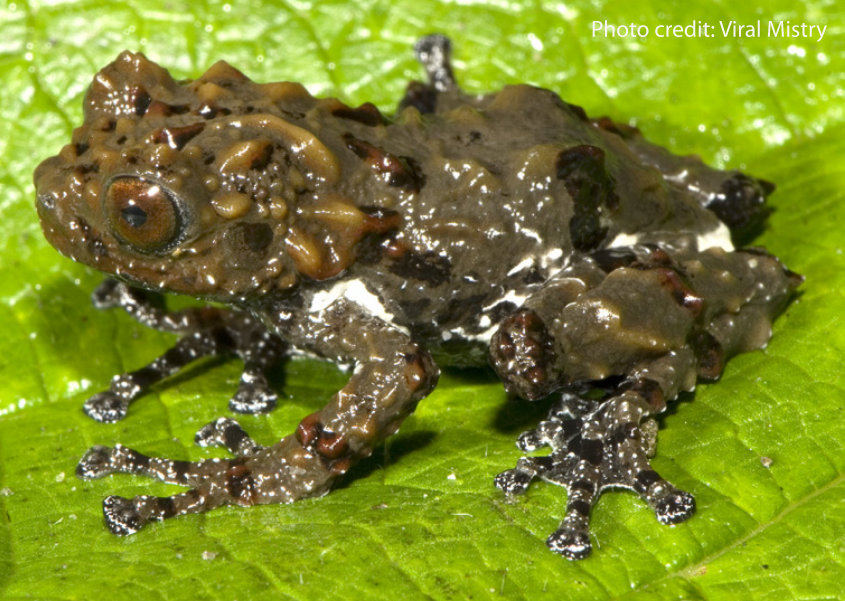

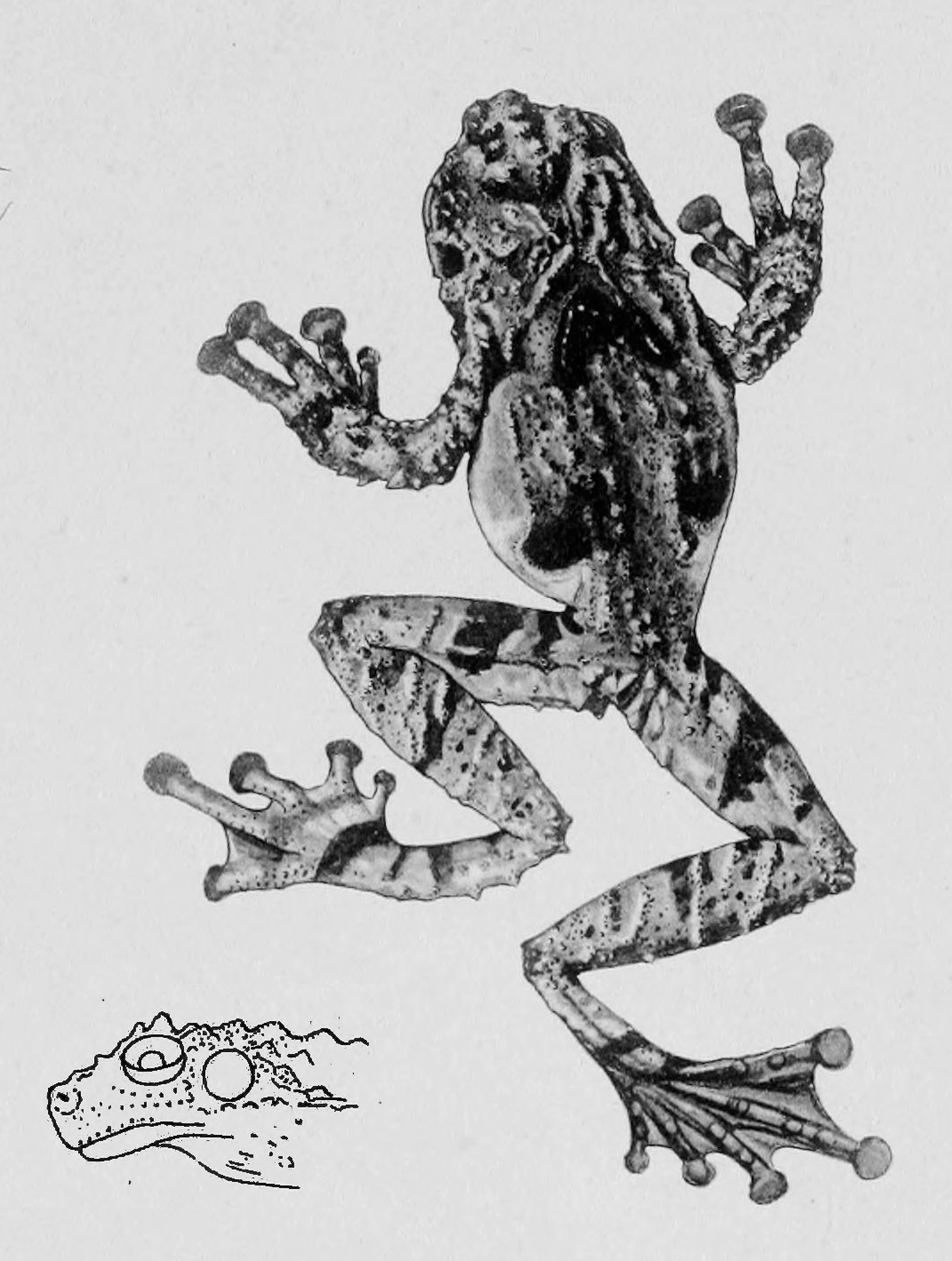

Conservation status
- Least Concern (IUCN 3.1)

Scientific classification
- Kingdom: Animalia
- Phylum: Chordata
- Class: Amphibia
- Order: Anura
- Family: Rhacophoridae
- Genus: Theloderma
- Species: T. moloch

Binomial name
- Theloderma moloch (Annandale, 1912)

Synonyms
- Phrynoderma moloch Annandale, 1912; Rhacophorus moloch (Annandale, 1912); Nyctixalus moloch (Annandale, 1912)

= Theloderma moloch =

Species of frog

Theloderma moloch, Assam Indonesia tree frog, Eerie tree frog, Xizang warty tree frog, or black-spotted frog is a species of frog in the family Rhacophoridae. It is found in northeastern India (Arunachal Pradesh and Assam) and adjacent Tibet, China, possibly wider. Taxonomic placement of this taxon has been a source of much debate, possibly because of wrong tissue was used for it in a molecular study—with ramifications for the taxonomy of whole Theloderma and its sister taxon Nyctixalus.

Theloderma moloch is an arboreal frog associated with tropical forest and shrubland. Scientists believe that breeding takes place in ponds surrounded by shrubs. This frog has been observed between 300 and 1500 meters above sea level.

The IUCN classifies this frog as at least concern of extinction because of its large range. Upcoming hydroelectric dam projects may alter the hydrology of the area in ways that threaten the frogs. Subsistence logging may also pose some threat.

The frog's range includes some protected parks: Yarlung Zangbo Grand Canyon National Nature Reserve in China and Dibang Wildlife Sanctuary, Mouling National Park, Nameri National Park, and Namdapha National Park in India.
