= Theloderma nagalandense =

Conservation status
- Data Deficient (IUCN 3.1)

Scientific classification
- Kingdom: Animalia
- Phylum: Chordata
- Class: Amphibia
- Order: Anura
- Family: Rhacophoridae
- Genus: Theloderma
- Species: T. nagalandense

Binomial name
- Theloderma nagalandense Orlov, Dutta, Ghate, and Kent, 2006

Synonyms
- Theloderma (Theloderma) nagalandense Orlov, Dutta, Ghate, and Kent, 2006

Species of frog

Theloderma nagalandense, the Nagaland tree frog, is a species of frog in the family Rhacophoridae. It is endemic to India. Scientists know it from the two type localities. Both are in Nagaland State, one 1196 meters above sea level and one 1421 meters above sea level.

Scientists found the holotype near a town that was not near any body of water, so they infer the frogs might tolerate a degree of habitat disturbance. They believe the frogs are probably arboreal and lay breed in tree holes containing water because that is what other frogs in Theloderma do, but this has yet to be confirmed.
