= Theloderma baibungense =

Conservation status
- Least Concern (IUCN 3.1)

Scientific classification
- Kingdom: Animalia
- Phylum: Chordata
- Class: Amphibia
- Order: Anura
- Family: Rhacophoridae
- Genus: Theloderma
- Species: T. baibungense

Binomial name
- Theloderma baibungense (Jiang, Fei and Huang in Fei, Hu, Ye and Huang, 2009)

Synonyms
- Aquixalus baibungensis Jiang, Fei, and Huang in Fei, Hu, Ye, and Huang, 2009; Theloderma baibengensis (Jiang, Fei and Huang in Fei, Hu, Ye and Huang, 2009); Theloderma (Theloderma) baibengense (Jiang, Fei and Huang in Fei, Hu, Ye and Huang, 2009)

Species of frog

Theloderma baibungense, the Baibung small treefrog, is a frog in the family Rhacophoridae. It lives in Thailand, Malaysia, and Indonesia. Scientists found some 82 and 193 and 850 meters above sea level.

This frog lives in wet habitats that are not too high above sea level. It lives in the forest canopy, but male individuals have been found on shrubs and weeds at night. It has not been observed in secondary forest and does not appear tolerant to clear-cutting.

Scientists have not observed this frog's eggs or tadpoles, but they infer it breeds through larval development in water-filled holes in trees like other frogs in Theloderma.

The IUCN classifies this frog as not in danger of dying out because of its large range. What threat it faces comes from habitat loss to build roads and logging.

The frog's range includes at least one protected park: Yarlung Zangbo Grand Canyon National Nature Reserve.
