= Theloderma stellatum =

Conservation status
- Least Concern (IUCN 3.1)

Scientific classification
- Kingdom: Animalia
- Phylum: Chordata
- Class: Amphibia
- Order: Anura
- Family: Rhacophoridae
- Genus: Theloderma
- Species: T. stellatum

Binomial name
- Theloderma stellatum Taylor, 1962

Species of frog

Theloderma stellatum, the Taylor's bug-eyed frog, purple-spotted warted frog, spotty warted tree frog, stellar bug-eyed frog, or Chantaburi bug-eyed tree frog is a species of frog in the family Rhacophoridae. It is found in Thailand, Cambodia, Laos, and Vietnam. Its natural habitats are subtropical or tropical moist lowland forests, subtropical or tropical periodically flooded lowland and montane forests between 0 and 1500 meters above sea level. This species deposits eggs in rain water collected in small tree holes; the tadpoles feed on the organic matter aggregated in a tannin-rich rain water. Notches aiming resin collection increase carrying capacity of the frogs providing additional breeding sites.

The IUCN classifies this frog as at least concern of extinction, but it does face some threat, mostly associated with habitat loss from logging and agriculture. The illegal harvesting of specific trees for the production of safrole oil also threatens this frog. Scientists also believe people may catch this frog to sell this has happened with other beautiful frogs in this genus.

The frog's range includes protected parks: Central Cardamoms Protected Forest, Phnom Samkos Wildlife Sanctuary, Khao Soi Daow Wildlife Sanctuary.
