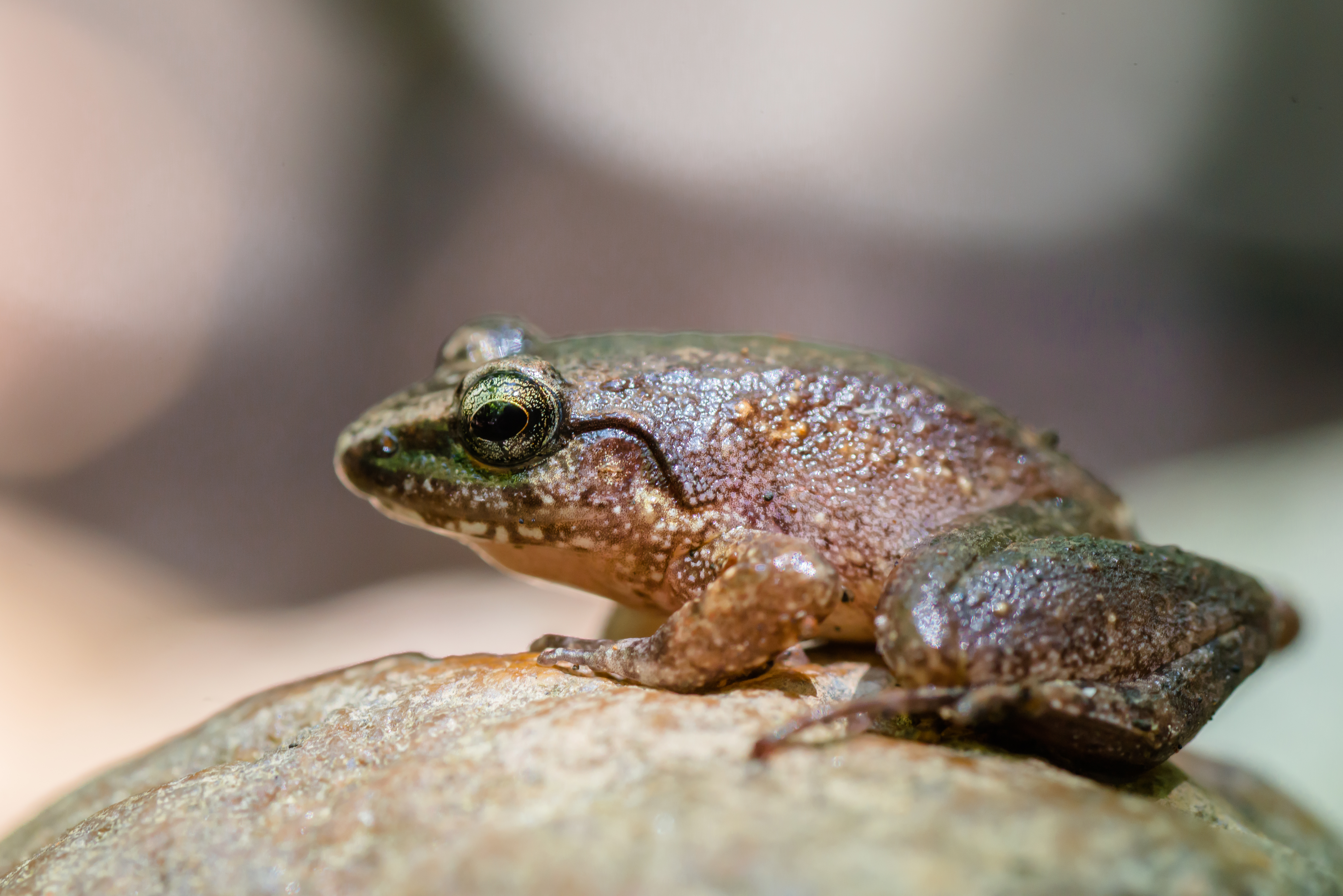
- Limnonectes hascheanus in Ko Lanta National Park, Thailand

Conservation status
- Least Concern (IUCN 3.1)

Scientific classification
- Kingdom: Animalia
- Phylum: Chordata
- Class: Amphibia
- Order: Anura
- Family: Dicroglossidae
- Genus: Limnonectes
- Species: L. hascheanus

Binomial name
- Limnonectes hascheanus (Stoliczka, 1870)

Synonyms
- Polypedates hascheanus Stoliczka, 1870; Taylorana hascheana (Stoliczka, 1870)

= Limnonectes hascheanus =

Species of frog

Limnonectes hascheanus is a species of frog in the family Dicroglossidae. It is found in the Malay Peninsula (from southern Myanmar and Thailand to Peninsular Malaysia); its occurrence in the Andaman Islands requires confirmation. It is a small frog, males being 19–25 mm (0.75–0.98 in) and females 21–25 mm (0.83–0.98 in) snout-vent length.

== Taxonomy ==
Taxonomic work by Robert F. Inger and Bryan L. Stuart in 2010 on Limnonectes hascheanus and L. limborgi has led to better understanding of these similar species — L. limborgi has been considered a junior synonym of L. hascheanus. While the species are morphologically similar, mainly differing in body size (L. hascheanus is smaller), they are genetically distinct. This taxonomic work has also led to redefinition of ranges of both species, and the range of L. hascheanus (as presently defined) is much more restricted than what was reported in the latest (2004) IUCN assessment for this species.

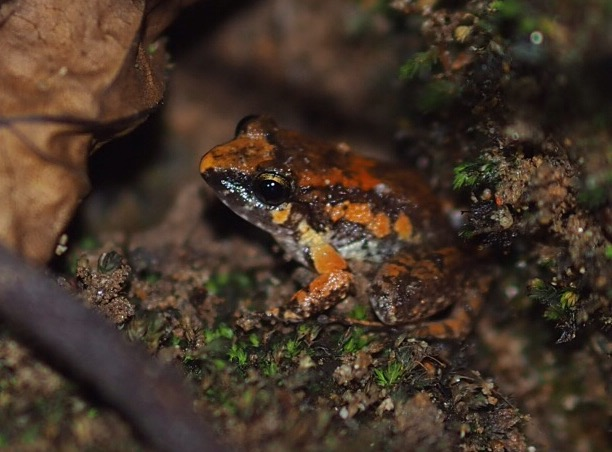
A male frog in breeding season

== Life cycle ==
The life cycle of Limnonectes hascheanus has earlier been reported to have direct development (no free-swimming tadpole stage, which instead hatch as tiny full-formed frogs). Notice that the original observations of this phenomenon came from outside the range of L. hascheanus and probably apply to L. limborgi. More importantly, careful observations have shown that L. limborgi has free-swimming but endotrophic larvae; this probably applies to L. hascheanus too.
