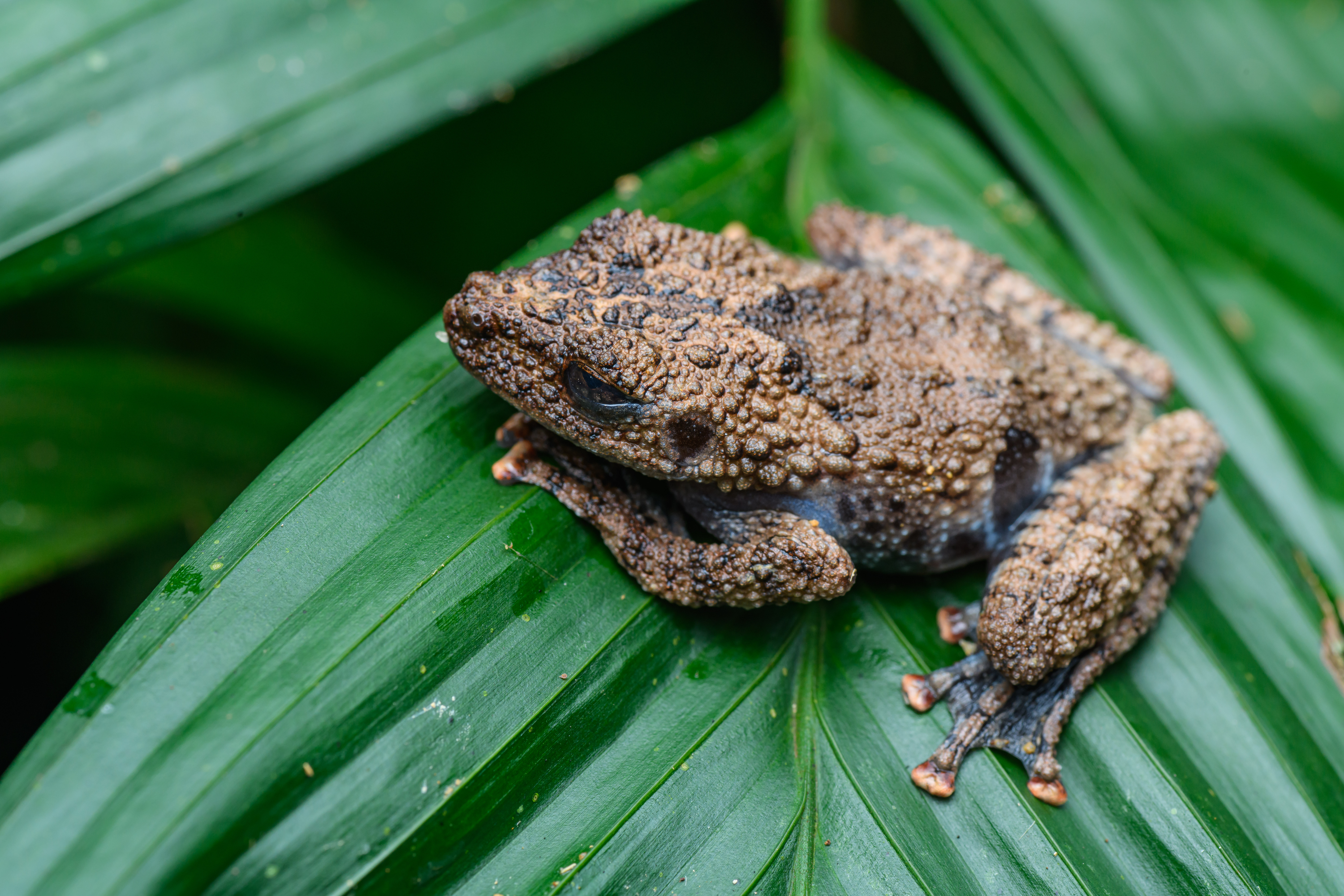

Conservation status
- Least Concern (IUCN 3.1)

Scientific classification
- Kingdom: Animalia
- Phylum: Chordata
- Class: Amphibia
- Order: Anura
- Family: Rhacophoridae
- Genus: Theloderma
- Species: T. horridum

Binomial name
- Theloderma horridum (Boulenger, 1903)

= Theloderma horridum =

Species of frog

Theloderma horridum is a species of frog in the family Rhacophoridae. It is found in Indonesia, Malaysia, Singapore, and Thailand.

This frog lives in lowland rainforests, where it specializes in old-growth forests, where it has been observed between 100 and 800 meters above sea level. They have been observed in the leaf litter and sitting on tree trunks.

The female frog lays eggs above the waterline in water-filled holes in trees. Tadpoles have been observed swimming in the water.

The IUCN classifies this frog as least concern of extinction. What threat it faces comes from deforestation associated with logging and clearing.

This frog's range includes several protected parks: Danum Conservation Area, Bukit Timah, Templer's Park Recreational Forest, Tanjung Biwah.
