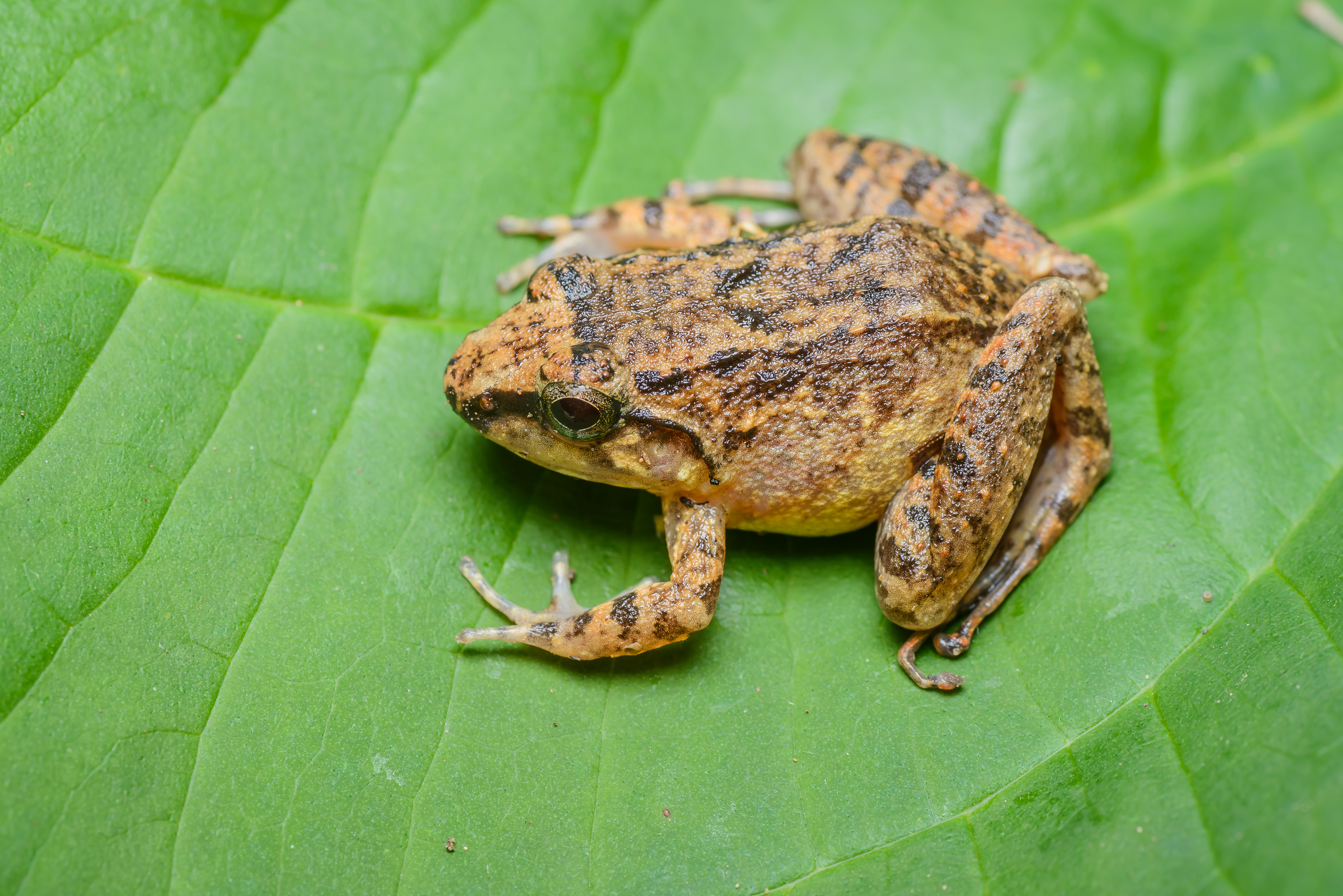

Conservation status
- Least Concern (IUCN 3.1)

Scientific classification
- Kingdom: Animalia
- Phylum: Chordata
- Class: Amphibia
- Order: Anura
- Family: Dicroglossidae
- Genus: Limnonectes
- Species: L. limborgi

Binomial name
- Limnonectes limborgi (Sclater, 1892)

Synonyms
- Rana limborgi Sclater, 1892; Taylorana limborgi (Sclater, 1892)

= Limnonectes limborgi =

Species of frog

Limnonectes limborgi is a species of frog in the Dicroglossidae. It is found in Burma, Thailand, Cambodia, Laos, and Vietnam; it might well occur in Northeast India and Yunnan, China. It is a small frog, males being 30–38 mm (1.2–1.5 in) and females 28–36 mm (1.1–1.4 in) snout-vent length.

== Taxonomy ==
Taxonomic work by Robert F. Inger and Bryan L. Stuart in 2010 on Limnonectes hascheanus and L. limborgi has led to better understanding of these similar species — L. limborgi has been considered a junior synonym of L. hascheanus. While the species are morphologically similar, mainly differing in body size (L. hascheanus being smaller), they are genetically distinct. This taxonomic work has also led to redefinition of ranges of both species, and the range of L. limborgi (as presently defined) is much broader than what was reported in the latest (2004) IUCN assessment for this species when it was considered "Data Deficient". However, L. limborgi may in fact consist of several species.

== Life cycle ==
Limnonectes limborgi has nidicolous development: eggs are oviposited terrestrially in a nest; the larvae hatch in the nest and are free-living but non-feeding. Male frogs attend the nest; their skin secretions might inhibit fungal or bacterial infections. This contrast to the earlier belief that Limnonectes limborgi has direct development, i.e., no free-swimming tadpole stage, and hatching as tiny full-formed frogs. Notice that this phenomenon is originally reported for L. hascheanus, but the observations came outside the range of that species, and probably apply to L. limborgi (as currently defined).
