= Theloderma lateriticum =

Conservation status
- Least Concern (IUCN 3.1)

Scientific classification
- Kingdom: Animalia
- Phylum: Chordata
- Class: Amphibia
- Order: Anura
- Family: Rhacophoridae
- Genus: Theloderma
- Species: T. lateriticum

Binomial name
- Theloderma lateriticum Bain, Nguyen, and Doan, 2009

Synonyms
- Theloderma (Theloderma) lateriticum Bain, Nguyen, and Doan, 2009

Species of frog

Theloderma lateriticum, the brick-red bug-eyed frog, is a frog in the family Rhacophoridae. It is native to Vietnam and China and has been observed 1130 meters above sea level.

This frog lives in submontane evergreen forests containing streams and seeps. It has been observed between 240 and 1400 meters above sea level.

This frog's eggs are large. The female frog lays 6–8 per clutch. When the eggs hatch, they fall into the water below.

The IUCN classifies this frog as at least concern of extinction. It is only rarely seen, but this is because it is difficult to see and not because it is truly rare.

The frog's range includes some protected parks: Hoang Lien–Van Ban Proposed Nature Reserve, Ngoc Son-Ngo Loung and Ha Kia-Pa Co Nature Reserve, and Tay Yen Tu Nature Reserve.

There are plans for a hydroelectric dam in the frog's range. Scientists expect this will have some impact on the population.

== Original description ==
- Bain RH; Nguyen TQ; Doan KV (2009). "A new species of the genus Theloderma Tschudi, 1838 (Anura: Rhacophoridae) from Northwestern Vietnam". Zootaxa (Full text). 2191 (3): 58–68. doi:10.24272/j.issn.2095-8137.2018.018. PMC 5968860. PMID 29683110.
