= Theloderma gordoni =

Conservation status
- Least Concern (IUCN 3.1)

Scientific classification
- Kingdom: Animalia
- Phylum: Chordata
- Class: Amphibia
- Order: Anura
- Family: Rhacophoridae
- Genus: Theloderma
- Species: T. gordoni

Binomial name
- Theloderma gordoni Taylor, 1962

Species of frog

Theloderma gordoni is a species of frog in the family Rhacophoridae. It is known from northern Thailand, northern Laos, and central to northern Vietnam. Common names Gordon's bug-eyed frog, Gordon's warted frog, and large warted treefrog have been coined for it.

Theloderma gordoni occurs in montane forests at elevations of 600–1,500 m (2,000–4,900 ft) above sea level, often in karst areas. Breeding takes place in water-filled tree holes and karst depressions where the tadpoles develop. It is threatened by habitat loss. It is also collected for the pet trade. It occurs in the Doi Suthep–Pui National Park in Thailand and in a number of protected areas in Vietnam.
