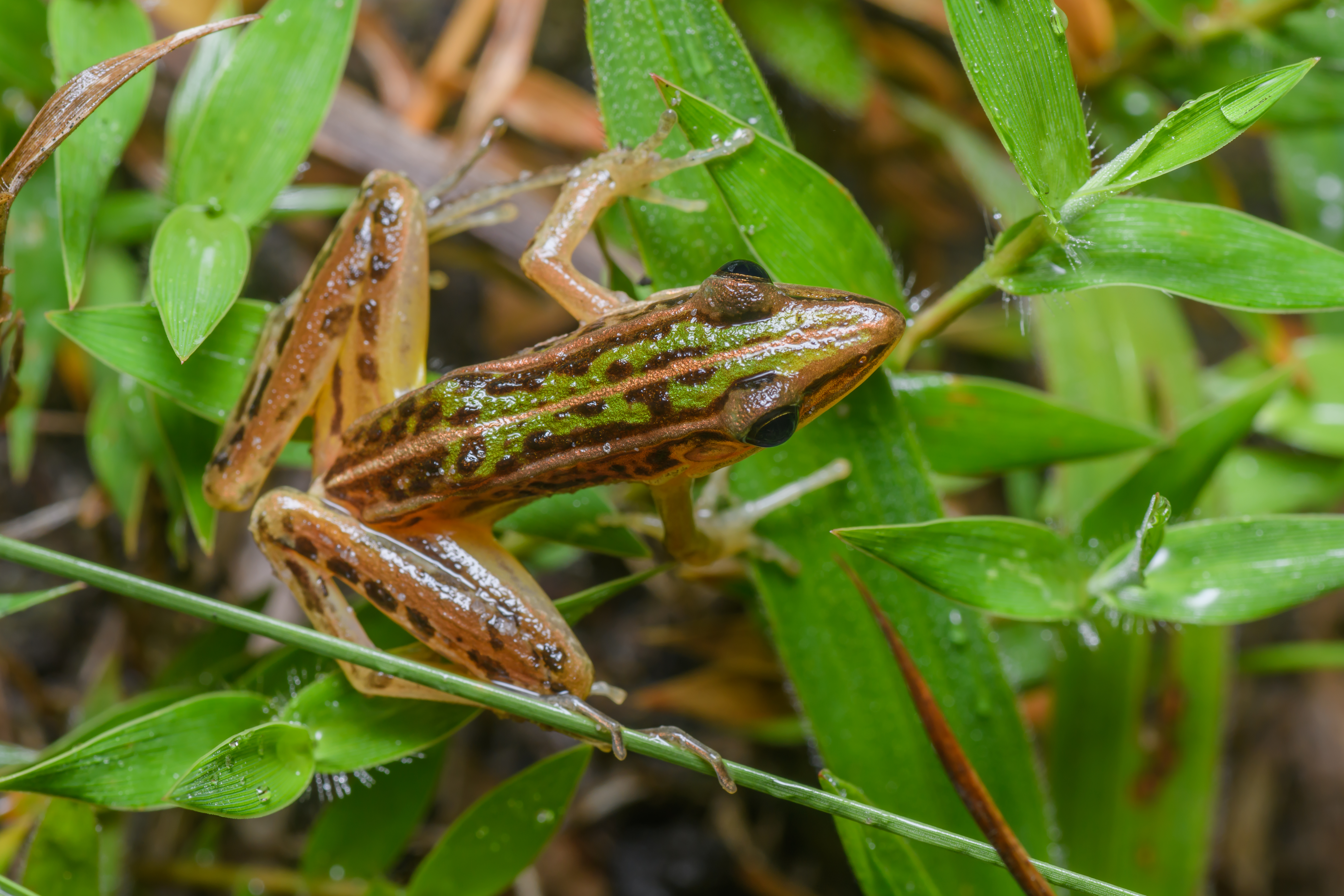
- Hylarana macrodactyla - Phu Kradueng National Park

Conservation status
- Least Concern (IUCN 3.1)

Scientific classification
- Kingdom: Animalia
- Phylum: Chordata
- Class: Amphibia
- Order: Anura
- Family: Ranidae
- Genus: Hylarana
- Species: H. macrodactyla

Binomial name
- Hylarana macrodactyla Günther, 1858

Synonyms
- Rana trivittata Hallowell, 1861; Hylorana macrodactyla — Günther, 1864; Hylorana subcoerulea Cope, 1868; Rana macrodactyla — Boulenger, 1882; Rana (Hylorana) macrodactyla — Boulenger In Mason, 1882; Rana (Limnodytes) macrodactyla — Bourret, 1927; Rana (Hylarana) macrodactyla — Bourret, 1941; Hylarana (Tenuirana) macrodactyla — Fei, Ye, and Huang, 1990; Hylarana macrodactyla — Song, Jang, Zou, and Shi, 2002; Rana (Hylarana) macrodactyla — Ohler and Mallick, 2003

= Hylarana macrodactyla =

Guangdong frog

Species of amphibian

Hylarana macrodactyla is a species of frog in the family Ranidae. It is also known as the Guangdong frog, three-striped grass frog and the marbled slender frog.

It is found in Cambodia, China, Hong Kong, Laos, Malaysia, Myanmar, Thailand, and Vietnam. Its natural habitats are subtropical or tropical dry forests, subtropical or tropical moist lowland forests, subtropical or tropical moist montane forests, subtropical or tropical seasonally wet or flooded lowland grassland, rivers, swamps, freshwater lakes, rural gardens, heavily degraded former forest, ponds, and irrigated land. It is threatened by habitat loss, depending on the wetland to sustain their populations during the adverse conditions in dry season.

== Photos ==
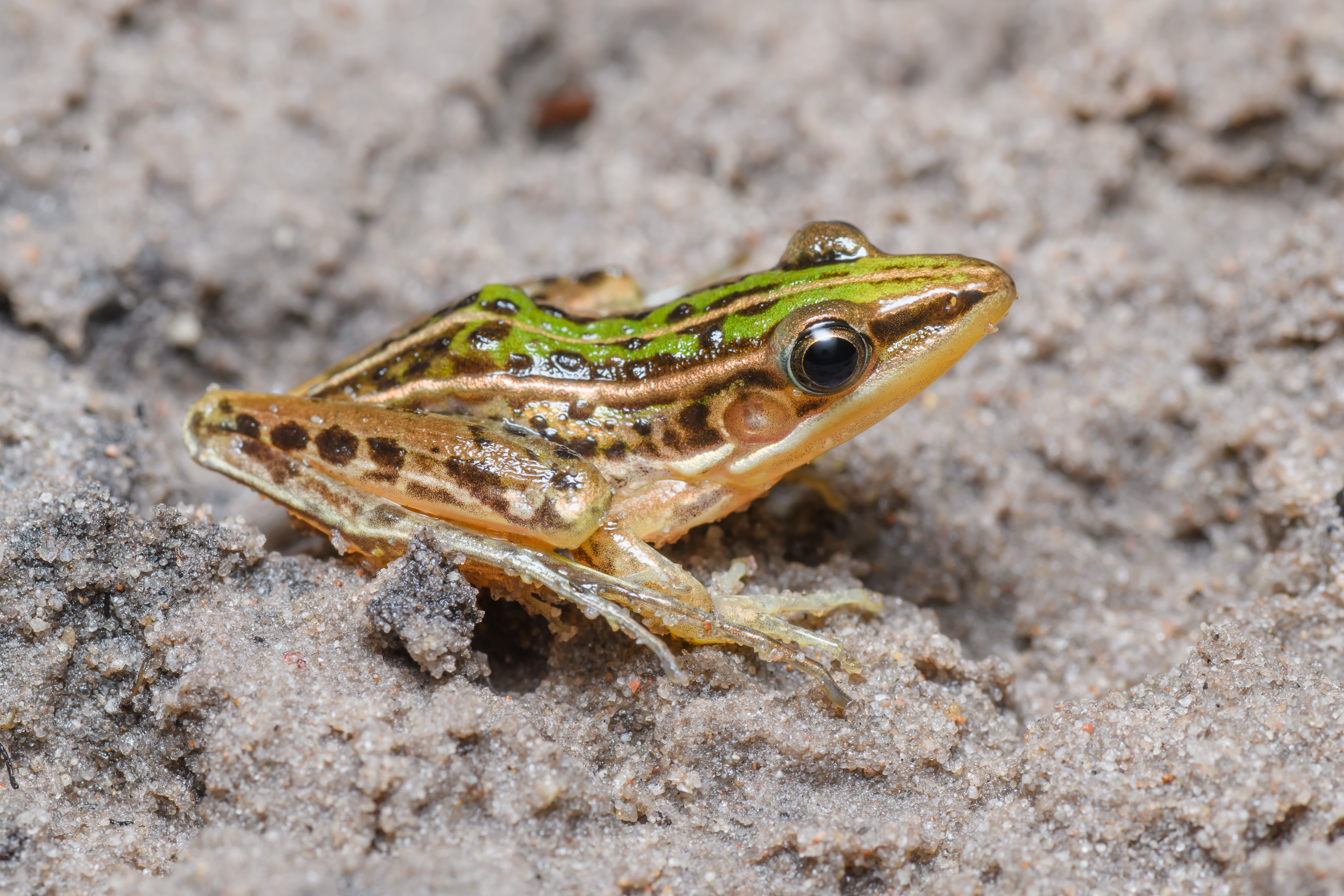
Hylarana macrodactyla - Phu Kradueng National Park

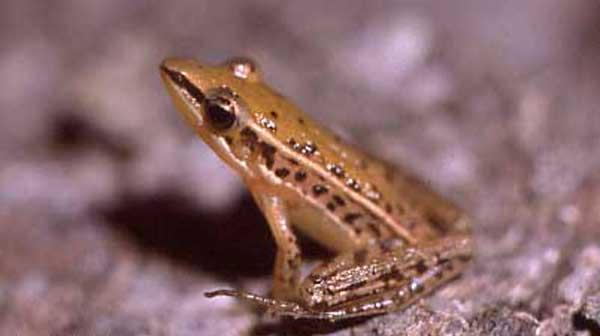

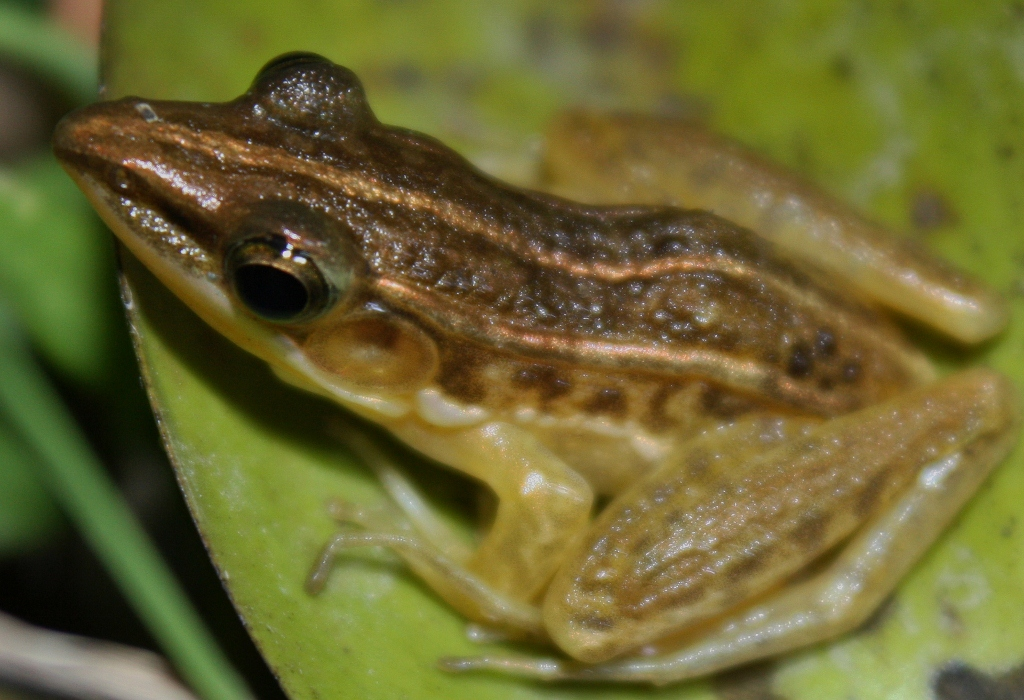

== Sources ==
- Che, Pang, Zhao, Wu, Zhao, and Zhang, 2007, Mol. Phylogenet. Evol., 43: 3,
- Frank and Ramus, 1995, Compl. Guide Scient. Common Names Amph. Rept. World: 108
