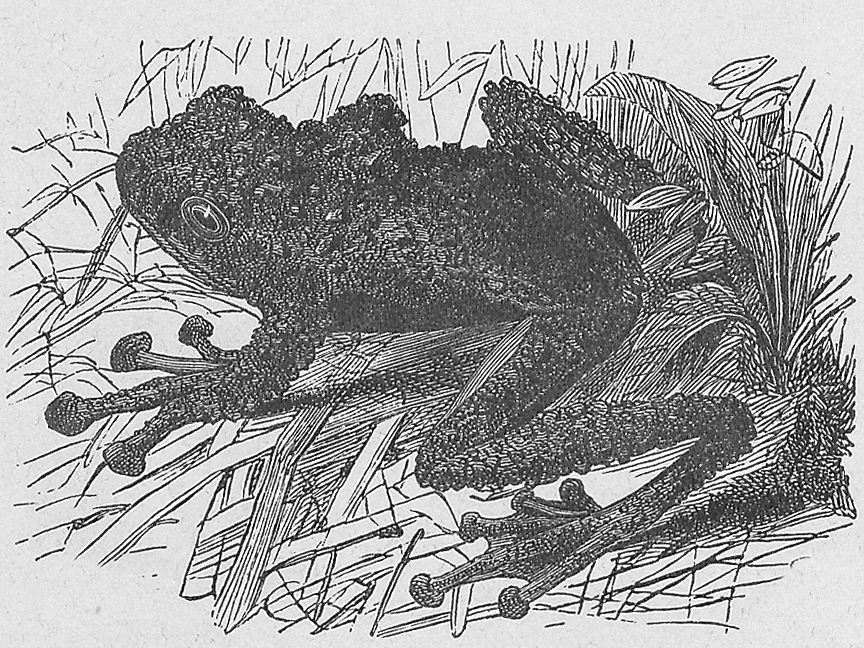

Conservation status
- Least Concern (IUCN 3.1)

Scientific classification
- Kingdom: Animalia
- Phylum: Chordata
- Class: Amphibia
- Order: Anura
- Family: Rhacophoridae
- Genus: Theloderma
- Species: T. leporosum

Binomial name
- Theloderma leporosum Tschudi, 1838

Synonyms
- Theloderma leporosa Tschudi, 1838; Polypedates leprosus Günther, 1887

= Theloderma leporosum =

Species of amphibian

Theloderma leporosum (Malaya bug-eyed frog) is a species of frog in the family Rhacophoridae. It is found in Peninsular Malaysia and Sumatra (Indonesia).

Theloderma leporosum inhabits evergreen lowland and montane rainforests. In Malaysia they inhabit primary and old secondary forests at high elevations. Ongoing habitat loss due to logging and agriculture is a threat to this species.

Theloderma leporosum is the largest and most elusive of the four Theloderma species in Peninsular Malaysia. They grow to snout–vent length of 68 mm (2.7 in) or more. They have brown dorsum, greyish brown iris, and orangish webbing on hind feet. Underside of their body and inner side of limbs are pale-blue to white with black reticulations.

The frog's range includes some protected parks: Gunung Stong State Park and Sibolangit Nature Reserve.
