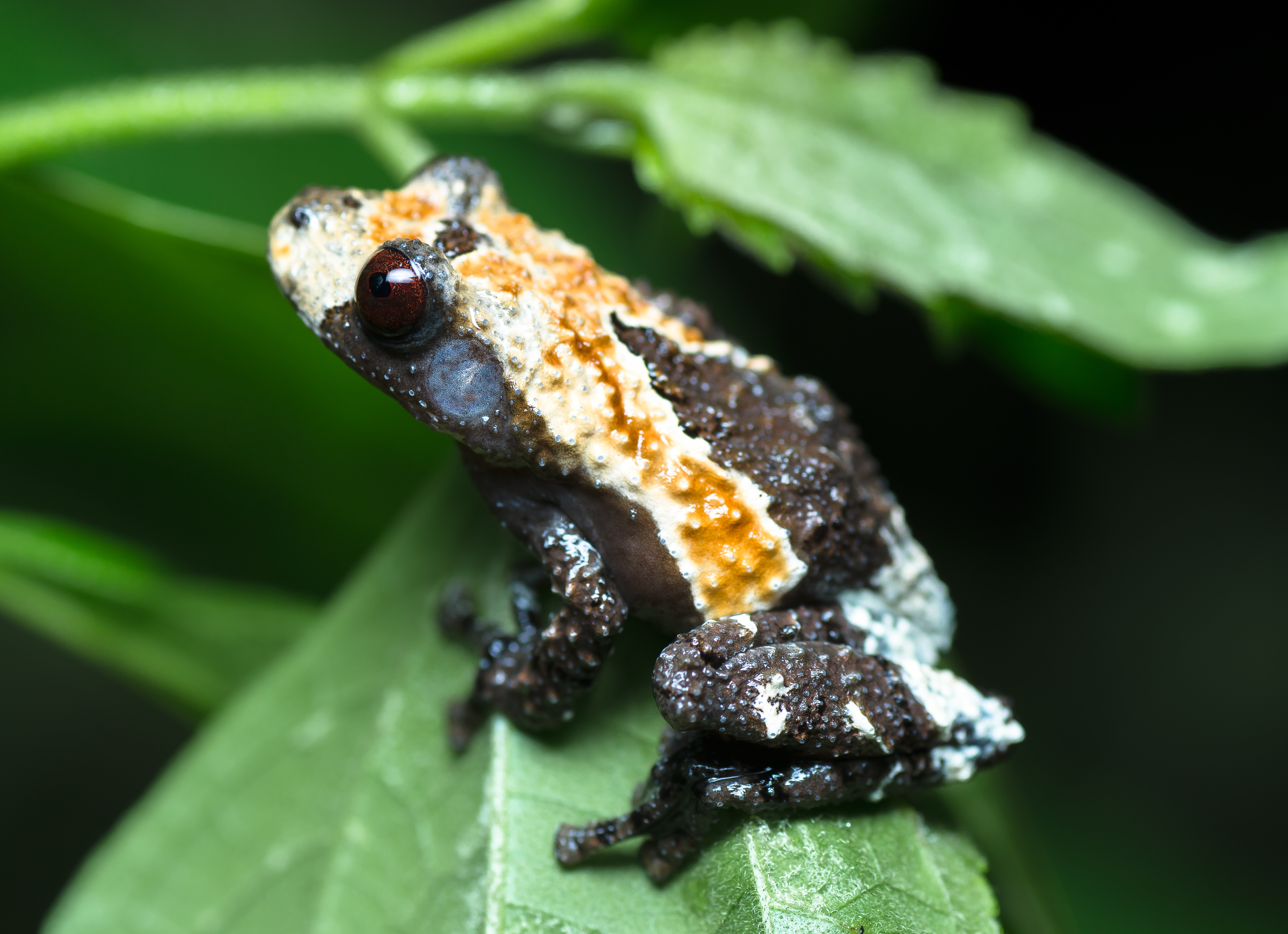

Conservation status
- Least Concern (IUCN 3.1)

Scientific classification
- Kingdom: Animalia
- Phylum: Chordata
- Class: Amphibia
- Order: Anura
- Family: Rhacophoridae
- Genus: Theloderma
- Species: T. albopunctatum

Binomial name
- Theloderma albopunctatum (Liu and Hu, 1962)

Synonyms
- Philautus albopunctatus Liu and Hu, 1962; Philautus (Philautus) albopunctatus Liu and Hu, 1962; Aquixalus albopunctatus (Liu and Hu, 1962); Liuixalus albopunctatus (Liu and Hu, 1962); Theloderma (Theloderma) albopunctatum (Liu and Hu, 1962)

= Theloderma albopunctatum =

Species of frog

Theloderma albopunctatum, the dotted bubble-nest frog, warty tree frog, rough-skinned small tree frog, cobalt-gray warted frog, rough-skinned whistling tree frog, rough-skinned small tree frog, rough paddle-leg frog, white-banded small tree frog, white-patterned small tree frog, white-spotted bug-eyed frog, or pied warted tree frog, is a species of frog in the family Rhacophoridae. It is endemic to China. Scientists believe it may also live in Vietnam, Laos, and Cambodia. There are similar frogs in India, Myanmar, and Thailand, but scientists suspect these are a complex of related species.

This frog lives in montane and submontane moist forests, where it has been observed on the ground and on low vegetation. This frog has been observed between 300 and 1350 meters above sea level.

This frog breeds through larval development in pools of water.

The IUCN classifies this species as least concern of extinction because of its large range and presume large population. What little disturbance it faces comes from habitat loss, largely in favor of agriculture, and forest tourism.

The frog's range includes several protected parks, for example Dayaoshan National Nature Reserve.

== Original description ==
- C.-c. Liu; S.-q. Hu (1962). "A herpetological report of Kwangsi". Acta Zoologica Sinica. 14 (Supplement): 73–104.
