= Petropedetes perreti =

Conservation status
- Critically Endangered (IUCN 3.1)

Scientific classification
- Kingdom: Animalia
- Phylum: Chordata
- Class: Amphibia
- Order: Anura
- Family: Petropedetidae
- Genus: Petropedetes
- Species: P. perreti

Binomial name
- Petropedetes perreti Amiet, 1973

Species of frog

Petropedetes perreti is a species of frog in the family Petropedetidae. It is endemic to Cameroon. It is known from the southern slopes of the Bamiléké Plateau, Mount Manengouba, and Mount Nlonako. The common names Perret's water frog and Perret's torrent frog have been coined for it.

== Taxonomy ==
This species was first described in 1973 by French herpetologist Jean-Louis Amiet, who designated an adult male specimen found 1,400–1,500 m (4,593.2–4,921.3 ft) above sea level on Mount Manengouba, Cameroon as the holotype. This specimen is kept in the Natural History Museum of Geneva and was originally cataloged as JLA 71.196, but its specimen number was changed to MHNG 1253.90 in 1997. The specific name perreti honours Jean-Luc Perret, a Swiss herpetologist who has specialized in African amphibians and was formerly the curator of herpetology at the museum. The species has been given the common names "Perret's water frog" and "Perret's torrent frog", which also honour Perret.

This frog is a member of the genus Petropedetes, which has several species distributed across Central Africa. The genus belongs in the family Petropedetidae, along with the East African genus Arthroleptides, and the two genera are the closest known relatives of each other. According to a phylogenetic study published in 2014, the closest known relative of Petropedetes perreti is Petropedetes juliawurstnerae, with the two species being sister taxa. The following cladogram shows the position of this species among its closest relatives according to the study:

- - Petropedetidae
    - Arthroleptides
      - A. martiensseni
      - - A. sp. nov.
        - A. yakusini
    - Petropedetes
      - P. palmipes
      - - P. sp. nov.
        - - - P. perreti
            - P. juliawurstnerae
          - - P. cameronensis
            - - - P. euskircheni
                - P. aff. euskercheni
              - - P. parkeri
                - - P. vulpiae
                  - - P. sp. nov. 2
                    - - P. sp. nov. 3
                      - P. johnstoni

== Description ==
Males measure 29–43 mm (1.1–1.7 in) and females 32–49 mm (1.3–1.9 in) in snout–vent length; it is a medium-sized member of its genus. The body is slender. The tympanum is distinct and nearly as large as the eye in males but distinctly smaller in females. The canthus rostralis is distinct but slightly rounded. The dorsum is brownish or greenish marbled with black parts, or more or less uniformly dark, and speckled with white minuscule spots. The hands are unwebbed whereas the feet are fully webbed.

== Habitat and conservation ==
Petropedetes perreti is a forest species that occurs along mountain streams at elevations of 1,200–1,700 m (3,900–5,600 ft) above sea level, or even higher. Adults have been found adhering with their bellies and limbs to stones in strong currents, sitting on stones amidst the river or some meters away from water, and on leaves of plants on the river sides. The egg clutches are deposited on rocks within the splash zone of rapids and waterfalls. The male appears to defend its clutch. The tadpoles can feed in the splash zone and only move to the water when disturbed.

It is threatened by habitat loss caused by agriculture, logging, and human settlements.
