= Usambara torrent frog =

Conservation status
- Endangered (IUCN 3.1)

Scientific classification
- Kingdom: Animalia
- Phylum: Chordata
- Class: Amphibia
- Order: Anura
- Family: Petropedetidae
- Genus: Arthroleptides
- Species: A. martiensseni

Binomial name
- Arthroleptides martiensseni Nieden, 1911

Synonyms
- Petropedetes martiensseni (Nieden, 1911)

Species of amphibian

The Usambara torrent frog (Arthroleptides martiensseni), also known as Martienssen's torrent frog or Tanzania rocky river frog, is a species of frog in the family Petropedetidae. It is endemic to the Usambara Mountains of Tanzania, where it is found 200–1,000 m (656.2–3,280.8 ft) above sea level. It is one of many, often taxonomically unrelated, frogs referred to as torrent frogs. It is mostly grey brown to yellowish brown, with a lighter underside and a dark stripe extending from the nostril to the shoulder, and can grow 59 mm (2.3 in) long.

The species was first described in 1911 by German zoologist Fritz Nieden, who studied a series of specimens collected two years prior. The scientific name is derived from Arthroleptis, a genus of frogs which this species bears some resemblance to, and Georg Martienssen, the German military commander who collected a specimen of this species. Some populations once thought to belong to this species are now known to represent different, related species such as the southern torrent frog. This frog is largely associated with rocky streams in montane forests, but can also be found in forest leaf litter far from water. It is a nocturnal species, emerging from shelters beneath boulders at night to catch prey such as smaller frogs. Eggs are laid on rocks close to torrential streams and waterfalls. The tadpoles remain attached to the rocks, where they develop, not entering the water. The species has been listed as Endangered by the IUCN as it is threatened by habitat loss and possibly the fungal disease chytridiomycosis.

== Taxonomy ==
The Usambara torrent frog was first discovered in 1909, when three individuals of this species were collected in Amani, Muheza. These specimens were sent to the Berlin Zoological Museum, where they were studied and described by German zoologist Fritz Nieden in 1911. Nieden noted that this species resembles frogs in the genera Arthroleptis and Petropedetes, but cannot be placed in either genus because of significant differences. Therefore, he established the new genus Arthroleptides to contain this species, which he gave the scientific name Arthroleptides martiensseni. The generic name refers to the similarity of this species to members of Arthroleptis, while the specific name honors German military commander Georg Martienssen, who collected one of the specimens. The other two specimens, including the holotype, were collected by German herpetologist Paul Krefft in the Usambara Mountains. Though the exact location where the Martienssen specimen was found is unknown, Nieden believed it is also in the Usambara Mountains.

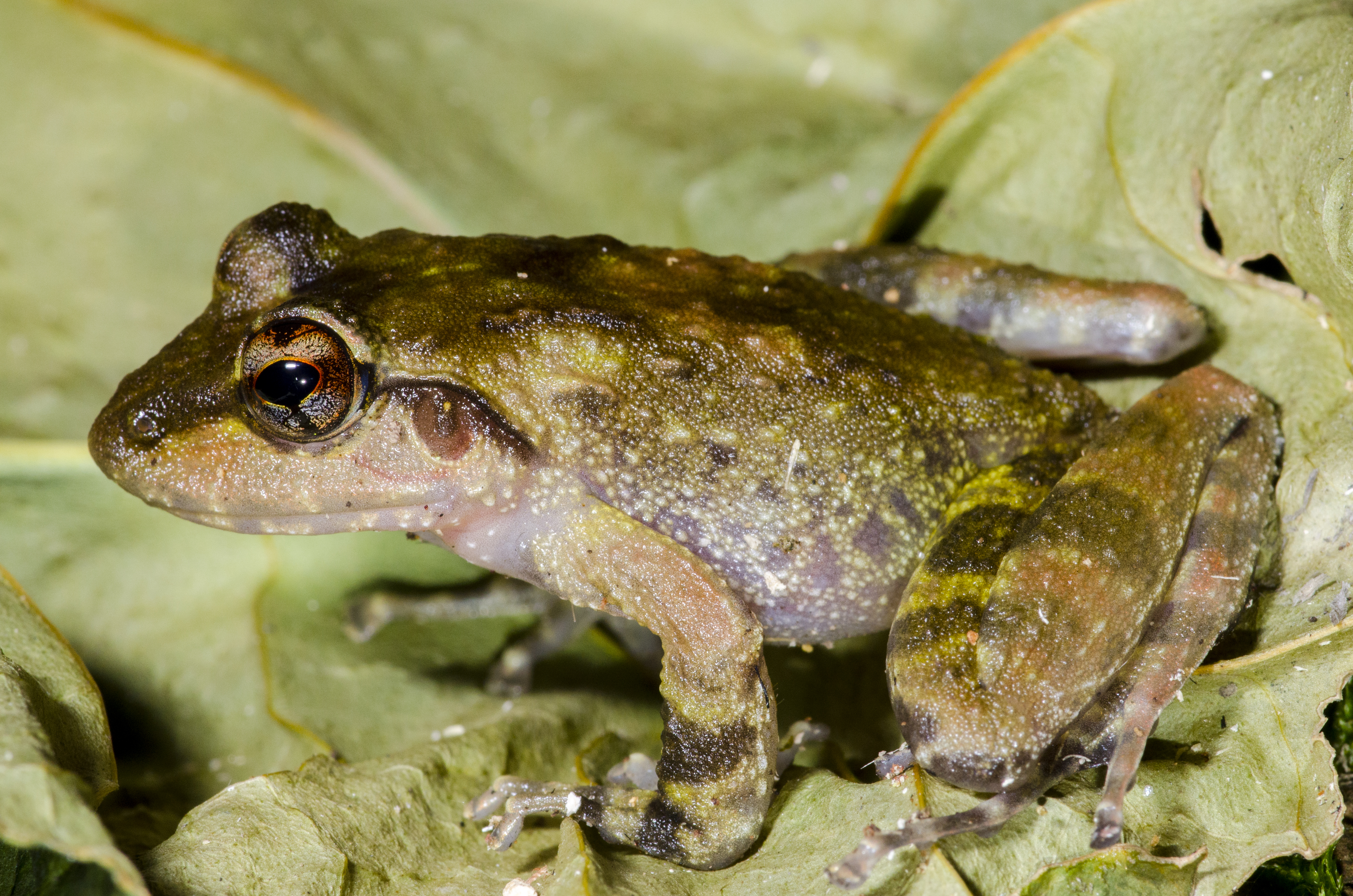
A southern torrent frog (Arthroleptides yakusini), a related species formerly confused with the Usambara torrent frog

A paper published in 2005 concluded that the Usambara torrent frog was nested within a clade of Petropedetes species. Consequently, Arthroleptides was declared a junior synonym of Petropedetes, and the species was renamed as Petropedetes martiensseni. However, a later study supported the resurrection of the genus Arthroleptides in 2014, and the original species name has been reinstated. Some frogs formerly thought to be members of this species have since been discovered to represent separate species. Fieldwork conducted between 1999 and 2001 showed that the torrent frog populations in the Udzungwa and Uluguru mountains represent a different species, which was named the southern torrent frog (Arthroleptides yakusini) in 2002. Another population from the Nguru Mountains has been found to be a distinct, unnamed species of Arthroleptides in 2013 based on molecular evidence. The following cladogram shows the position of the Usambara torrent frog among its closest relatives according to Barej et al (2014):

- - Petropedetidae
    - Arthroleptides
      - A. martiensseni
      - - A. sp. nov.
        - A. yakusini
    - Petropedetes
      - P. palmipes
      - - P. sp. nov.
        - - - P. perreti
            - P. juliawurstnerae
          - - P. cameronensis
            - - - P. euskircheni
                - P. aff. euskercheni
              - - P. parkeri
                - - P. vulpiae
                  - - P. sp. nov. 2
                    - - P. sp. nov. 3
                      - P. johnstoni

== Distribution and habitat ==
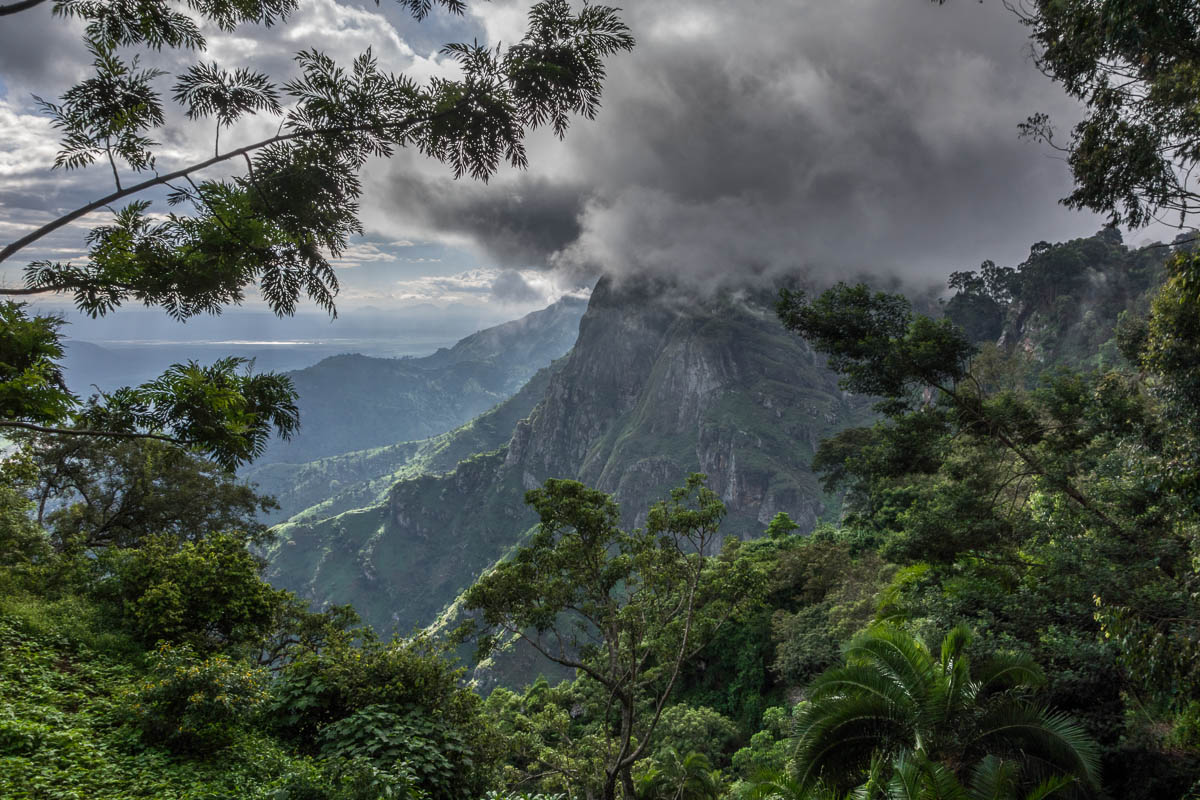
View of the montane forest in the Usambara Mountains

Prior to 2002, it was believed that all frogs in Tanzania belonging to the genus Arthroleptides were Usambara torrent frogs. However, it is now known that some populations formerly lumped into this species are actually separate species, with the southern torrent frog occurring in the Udzungwa, Uluguru and Mahenge mountains, and an unnamed Arthroleptides species living in the Nguru Mountains. Currently, "true" Usambara torrent frogs are believed to be endemic to the Usambara Mountains of northeastern Tanzania, where they occur at elevations of 200–1,000 m (656.2–3,280.8 ft) above sea level and have an estimated extent of occurrence of 635.45 km^{2} (245.3 sq mi). This species is largely restricted to mature forest, especially along rocky montane streams, though it can occur far from water and has been recorded in a tea estate.

== Description ==
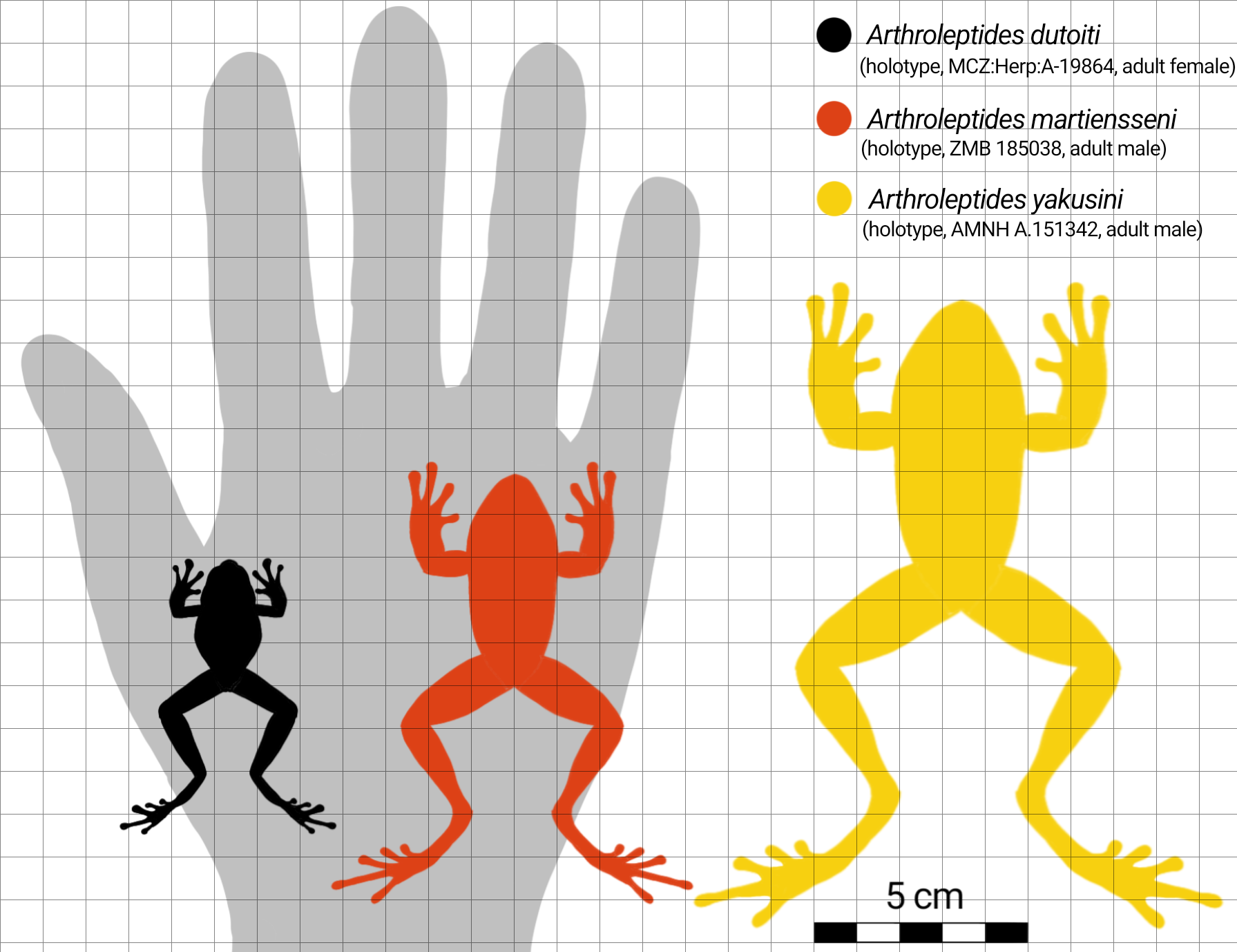
Sizes of the holotype specimens of three Arthroleptides species compared to a human hand, with the Usambara torrent frog shown in orange

The Usambara torrent frog is an amphibian of moderate size, with the adult male type specimen collected in 1909 measuring 50 mm (2.0 in) in snout-vent length, and another, larger individual found in the same year measuring 59 mm (2.3 in). The head is about as long as it is wide, with a rather flat, blunt-tipped snout and a prominent canthal ridge (the ridge connecting the snout tip to the front edge of the eye). No vomerine teeth are present in this species. The nostrils are located around twice as far from the eyes as from the snout tip, and the distance between the eyes is slightly more than the width of the upper eyelid. The tympana are distinctly visible, each a little less than two thirds as wide as the eyes, which have horizontal pupils. The tips of the digits are broadened into wide discs, each with a slight groove. The length of the hind legs down to the tibiotarsal joint exceeds the snout-vent length. In mature individuals, the skin is generally smooth, but younger frogs possess warts arranged in regularly spaced rows down their backs. The webbing on the hind feet is very reduced, never exceeding the proximal tubercle on the underside of the fourth toe, a feature distinguishing this species from the related southern torrent frog (in which the webbing extends around twice as far).

The coloration of this frog is an example of countershading, with the skin being mostly grey-brown to yellow-brown above, while the underside is whitish or yellowish. On each side of the head, a dark stripe runs from the nostril to the shoulder, stretching through the eye and above the tympanum. The limbs are largely brown, with distinctive transversing dark bands. Some individuals may have a head more darkly colored than their back, or lighter coloration on the sides of the head, with a light triangular pattern between the eyes pointing forwards.

=== Tadpoles ===
The tadpoles of this species are semiterrestrial, living on wet rock surfaces outside of water, and are largely similar in appearance to many other semiterrestrial tadpoles such as those of Indirana beddomii, Petropedetes perreti and Petropedetes vulpiae. The main body (excluding the tail) of the tadpole is oval shaped and the tail is very long; in one 29.6 mm (1.17 in) long tadpole the tail measured 21.7 mm (0.85 in), making up 73% of its total length. The tail fins are reduced, appearing as low ridges along the upper and lower sides of the tail. The snout is narrowly rounded when viewed from above, and when viewed from the side it slopes downwards. The eyes are large and bulge above the rest of the body. The nostrils are round and face the sides of the head, with a subtle rim around the top part. A single spiracle is present on the left side of the body, located just below the boundary of the body pigment. Both the upper and lower jaws bear serrated keratinous sheaths, with the upper sheath strongly curved to resemble the beak of a parrot. The oral disc contains three upper tooth rows and three lower tooth rows surrounding the jaw sheaths, with the upper rows being split in the middle to accommodate the large upper sheath. Each tooth row bears many tiny teeth, with the first upper row bearing about 55 teeth per mm (0.039 in) near the center.

The upper side of the body has a black color derived mainly from chromatophores in the skin, with scattered white spots and mottled patterns, aside from a crescent-shaped area around the snout which is only lightly pigmented or lacks pigment altogether. The underside is clear, allowing the coiled gut with five spirals to be seen through it. Between 10 and 13 russet diamond-shaped bands are present on the tail, which appear white in preserved specimens.

== Biology ==
A nocturnal animal, the Usambara torrent frog tends to shelter beneath large boulders near streams during the day, emerging at night to feed. Based on its wide jaws, it has been suggested that this species feeds on smaller frogs such as the common squeaker, which is commonly found in the leaf litter within the range of this species. Adult Usambara torrent frogs can be found both along fast flowing rocky streams and in forest leaf litter away from water, while juvenile frogs are known from quiet pools and seepages. The coloration of the adult provides excellent camouflage against leaf litter, allowing it to blend in and avoid detection from predators and prey.

This species lays its eggs on the wet surfaces of rocks near waterfalls and torrential streams, rather than directly in the water like many other frogs. The eggs each measure about 1.3 mm (0.051 in) in diameter, with a dark colored animal pole. The tadpoles develop outside of the water, using their distinctive mouthparts to attach themselves to the rock surface and quickly flipping their long tails for locomotion, each flip propelling them 1–2 cm (0.39–0.79 in). They prefer fine grained, smooth rocks in shady, downstream areas away from the torrent, sometimes occupying cracks in the rocks, and can attach themselves to sloping or even nearly vertical surfaces. The cryptic coloration of the tadpoles helps them camouflage against the rocks, their speckled patterns and tail bands helping to break up their outline. The hind limbs develop much faster than the front limbs; a stage 36 Usambara torrent frog tadpole has differentiated toes with toe pads on its hind limbs while the front limbs are short, unerupted buds with no signs of digit formation, whereas the tadpole of a more typical frog (such as a southern leopard frog) in the same stage has front and hind limbs in comparable development stages.

== Conservation ==
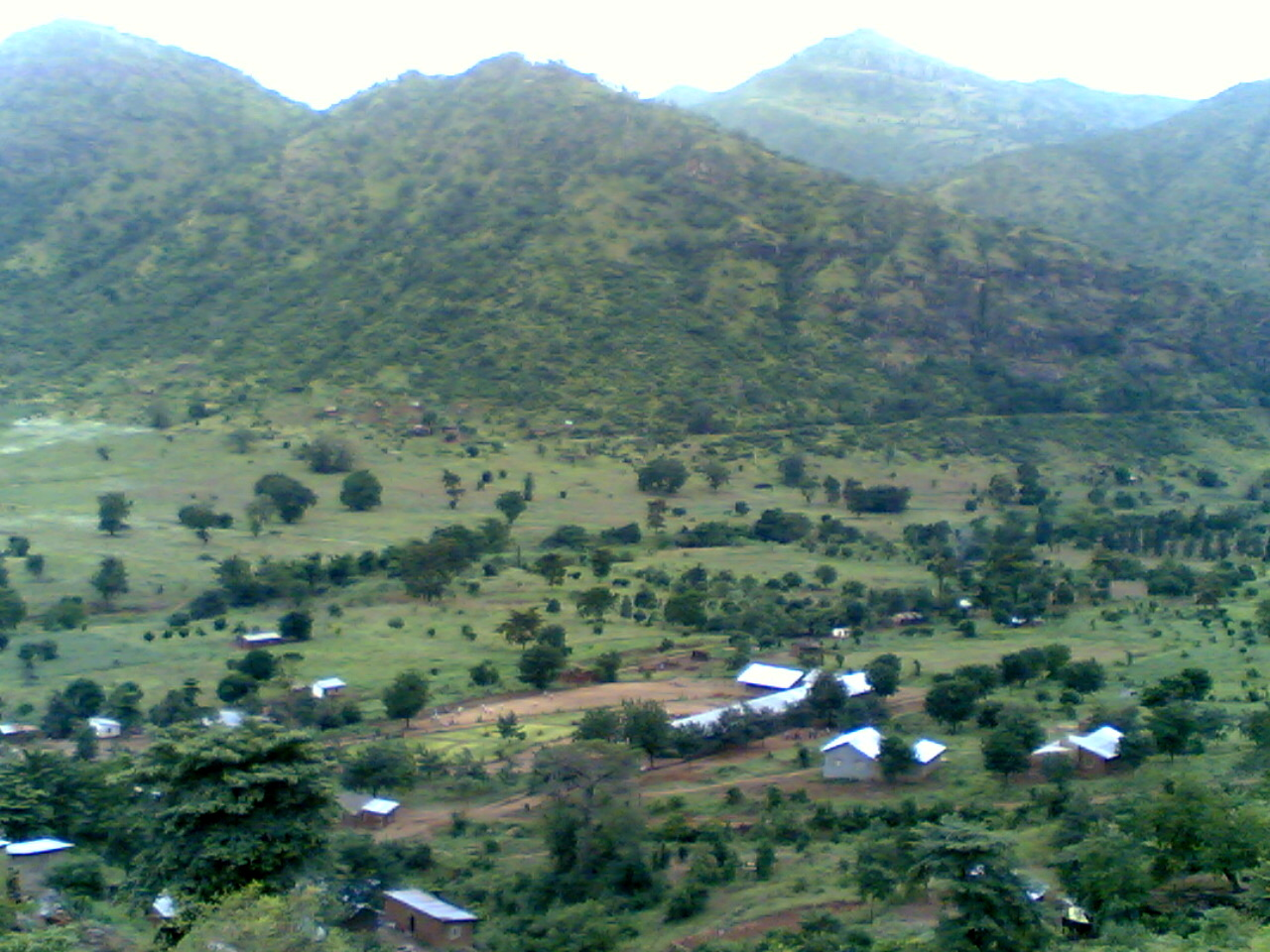
Rural settlement in the Usambara Mountains

The IUCN assessed this frog as an Endangered species in 2013. Although it remains common within areas with suitable habitat and the population is not severely fragmented, the extent of forest decline in its small range due to the expansion of rural settlements, logging and agriculture is rapidly reducing the amount of suitable habitat, and the siltation of streams may also affect it. This species may also be threatened by the spread of the pathogenic fungus Batrachochytrium dendrobatidis, which causes the disease chytridiomycosis in infected amphibians and has been recorded in the closely related southern torrent frog. Though the Usambara torrent frog does occur in protected areas such as the Nilo and Amani nature reserves, the protection of forests in the Usambara Mountains still requires further strengthening and expansion, and the population of the species needs close monitoring considering the potential threat of chytridiomycosis.
