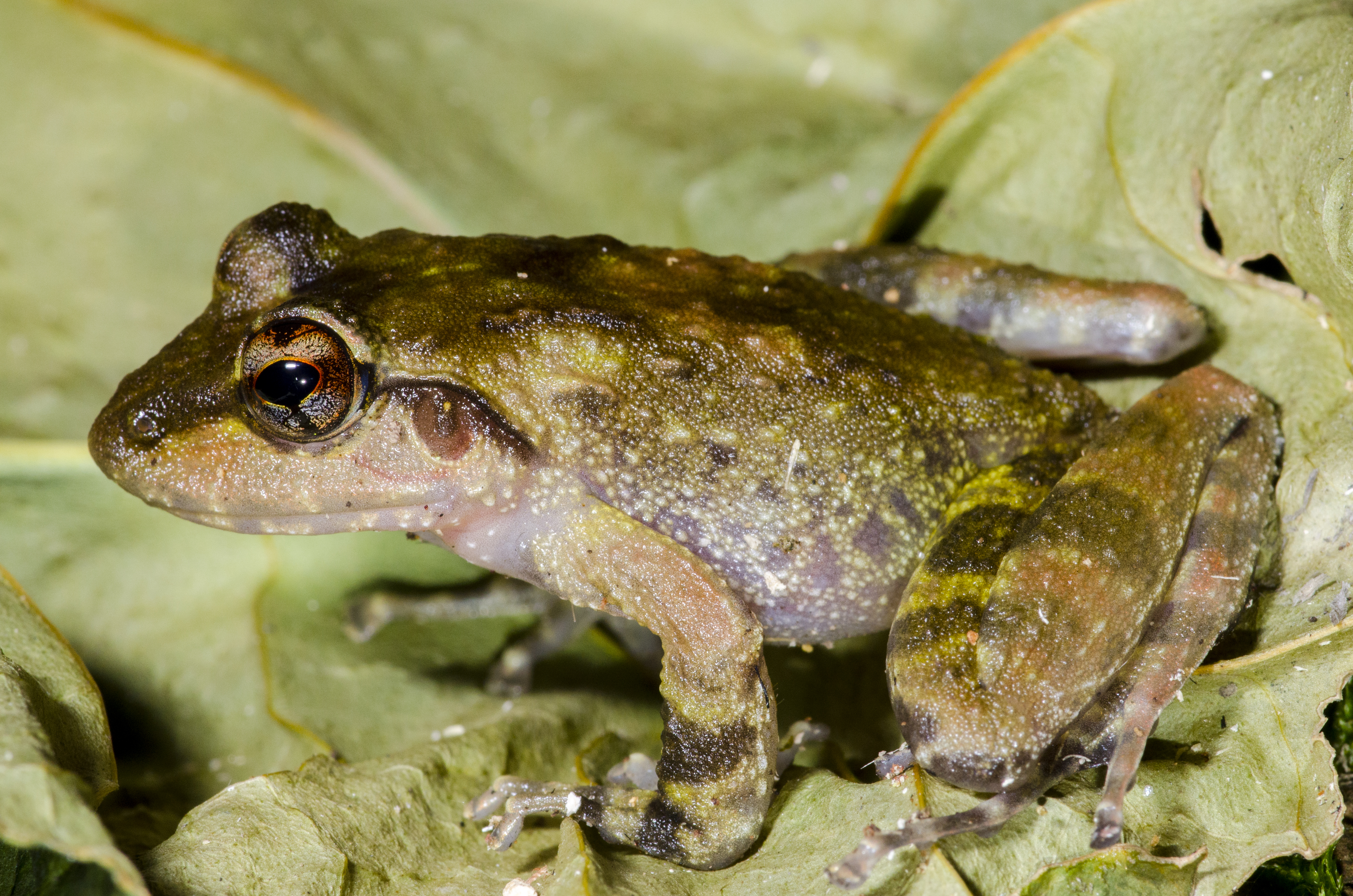
- Wild adult in the Udzungwa Mountains, Tanzania

Conservation status
- Near Threatened (IUCN 3.1)

Scientific classification
- Kingdom: Animalia
- Phylum: Chordata
- Class: Amphibia
- Order: Anura
- Family: Petropedetidae
- Genus: Arthroleptides
- Species: A. yakusini

Binomial name
- Arthroleptides yakusini Channing, Howell, and Moyer, 2002

Synonyms
- Petropedetes yakusini (Channing, Moyer, and Howell, 2002)

= Southern torrent frog =

Species of amphibian

The southern torrent frog (Arthroleptides yakusini) is a species of frog in the family Petropedetidae endemic to Tanzania, where it is found in the Uluguru, Udzungwa, and Mahenge Mountains. It is one of many, often taxonomically unrelated, frogs referred to as torrent frogs. It occurs mainly around rocky montane streams surrounded by mature forest at elevations of 300–2,800 m (984.3–9,186.4 ft) above sea level, but also can be found on the forest floor away from water, and may be tolerant of open woodland environments. While it is sometimes claimed to be found in the Nguru Mountains as well, molecular evidence shows that this population may instead represent an unnamed species.

This frog is a nocturnal species, spending the daytime hidden away under rocks and emerging to feed after nightfall. It can grow over 70 mm (2.8 in) in snout-vent length, with males commonly growing larger than females. With its wide jaws, it is believed to prey on smaller frogs. The upper side of its body is mainly gray-brown with mottled patterns and an orange-reddish stripe stretching across each eye, camouflaging it against the leaf litter, while the underside is pale. During the breeding season, mature males produce advertisement calls to attract mates and develop a number of secondary sexual characteristics, including swollen forearms, spines on the throat and chin, knobs on the metacarpal area and a soft protrusion called a tympanic papilla on each tympanum. Eggs are laid on rocks over which a film of water is present, either in small clusters of four to five eggs or large groupings of about 200. The tadpoles remain attached to the rocks, developing out of water for 8 to 10 weeks until their metamorphosis is complete.

This species was named and described in 2002, with an adult male specimen collected in 1995 being designated as the holotype. Prior to this, it was thought to represent a population of the Usambara torrent frog, now known to be a closely related yet separate species. The specific name originates from the Swahili words "ya kusini" which mean "of the south", and the common name "southern torrent frog" has been given to this species, though this common name is also used for the unrelated Asian species Amolops australis. This African species has been listed as Endangered by the IUCN, as it has a severely fragmented distribution and its forest habitat is under threat from encroaching agriculture. Various diseases such as strongyloidiasis and chytridiomycosis are known to occur in this frog, the latter of which is known to cause drastic amphibian population declines, though these illnesses are not always fatal to the infected frog.

== Taxonomy ==
Prior to 2002, it was thought that all Tanzanian frogs belonging to the genus Arthroleptides were part of a single species, the Usambara torrent frog (A. martiensseni). However, a study was published that year based on fieldwork conducted from 1999 to 2001 which found that individuals from the Udzungwa and Uluguru mountains were consistently distinguishable from those found in the Usambara Mountains further north (where the type specimen of the Usambara torrent frog was collected). Therefore, the southern form was described as a new species and given the scientific name Arthroleptides yakusini, with the specific name being derived from the Swahili words "ya kusini", meaning "of the south" and referencing how this species occurs south of the range of the Usambara torrent frog. The holotype specimen is an adult male collected along the Njokomoni River in Udzungwa Mountains National Park on 8 December 1995, and three other individuals collected at the same site and time were designated as paratypes. These specimens, along with seven others of the same species, were sent to the American Museum of Natural History and were the subjects of a study published in 1998, prior to the recognition of this species, in which they were wrongly referred to as A. martiensseni. The common name "southern torrent frog" has been given to A. yakusini, though this name has also been proposed in 2018 for Amolops australis, an unrelated frog species discovered in Malaysia.

A paper published in 2005 concluded that the genus Arthroleptides is a junior synonym of Petropedetes, and therefore this species was renamed as Petropedetes yakusini. However, a 2014 study resurrected the former genus as a valid taxon, thus reinstating the original scientific name of the species. Both Arthroleptides and Petropedetes belong in the family Petropedetidae, and the two genera were found to be the closest known relatives of each other. The following cladogram shows the position of the southern torrent frog among its closest relatives according to said study:

- - Petropedetidae
    - Arthroleptides
      - A. martiensseni
      - - A. sp. nov.
        - A. yakusini
    - Petropedetes
      - P. palmipes
      - - P. sp. nov.
        - - - P. perreti
            - P. juliawurstnerae
          - - P. cameronensis
            - - - P. euskircheni
                - P. aff. euskercheni
              - - P. parkeri
                - - P. vulpiae
                  - - P. sp. nov. 2
                    - - P. sp. nov. 3
                      - P. johnstoni

== Distribution and habitat ==
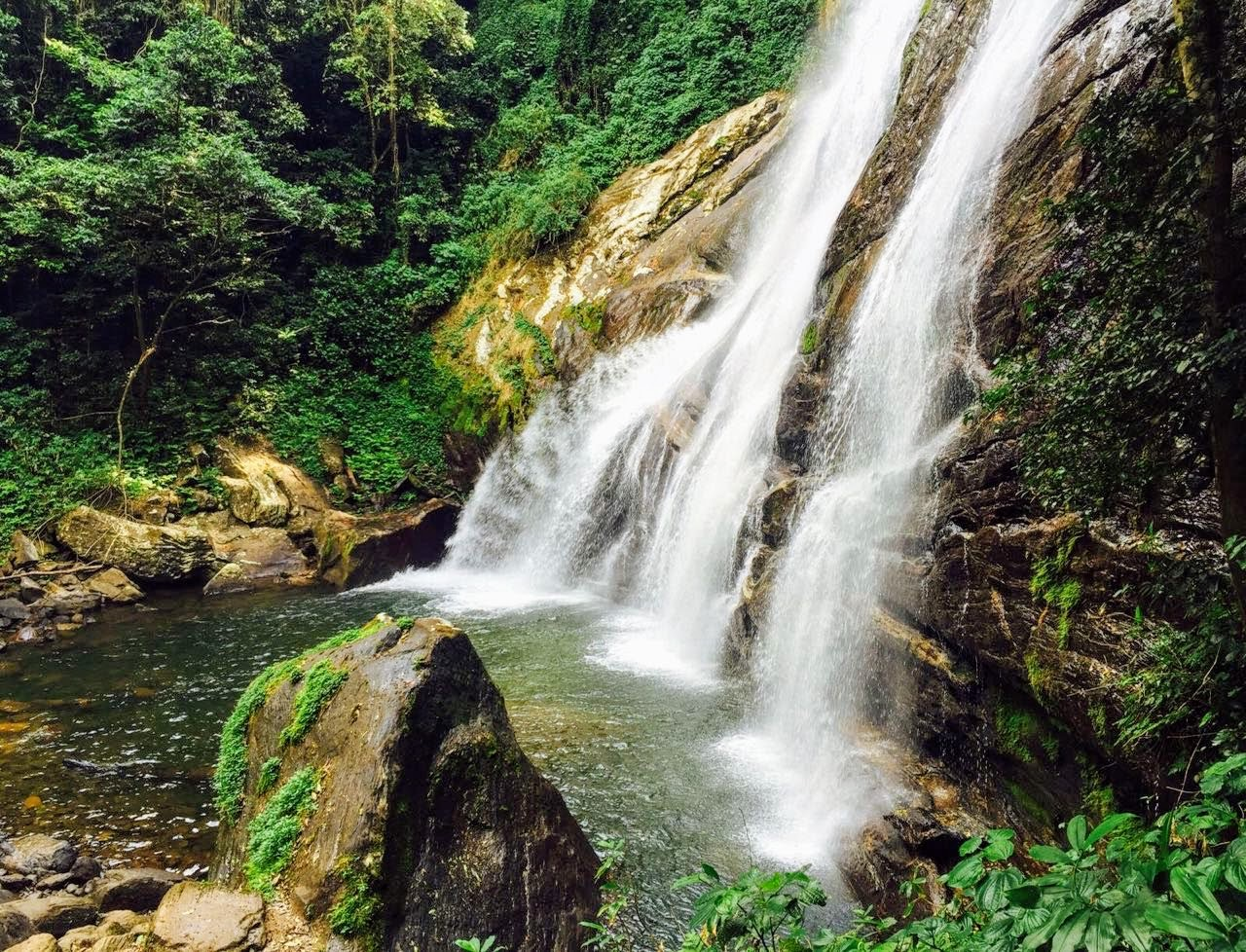
Rocky stream with a waterfall in the Udzungwa Mountains

The southern torrent frog is endemic to Tanzania, where it occurs in mountain ranges from 300–2,800 m (984.3–9,186.4 ft) above sea level. It was first discovered in the Uluguru and Udzungwa mountain ranges, and in 2004 it was reported to occur in the Mahenge Mountains as well. Though sometimes claimed to also be found in the Nguru Mountains, molecular evidence suggests this population actually represents a separate, currently unnamed species within the same genus. The southern torrent frog mostly inhabits rocky streams surrounded by montane forest, with a preference for mature forest (though it may tolerate open woodland habitats more than the related Usambara torrent frog), and has an estimated extent of occurrence of 3,113.18 km^{2} (1,202.0 sq mi). It can also occur further from these streams, with adults sometimes being found some distance away from water on the forest floor.

== Description ==
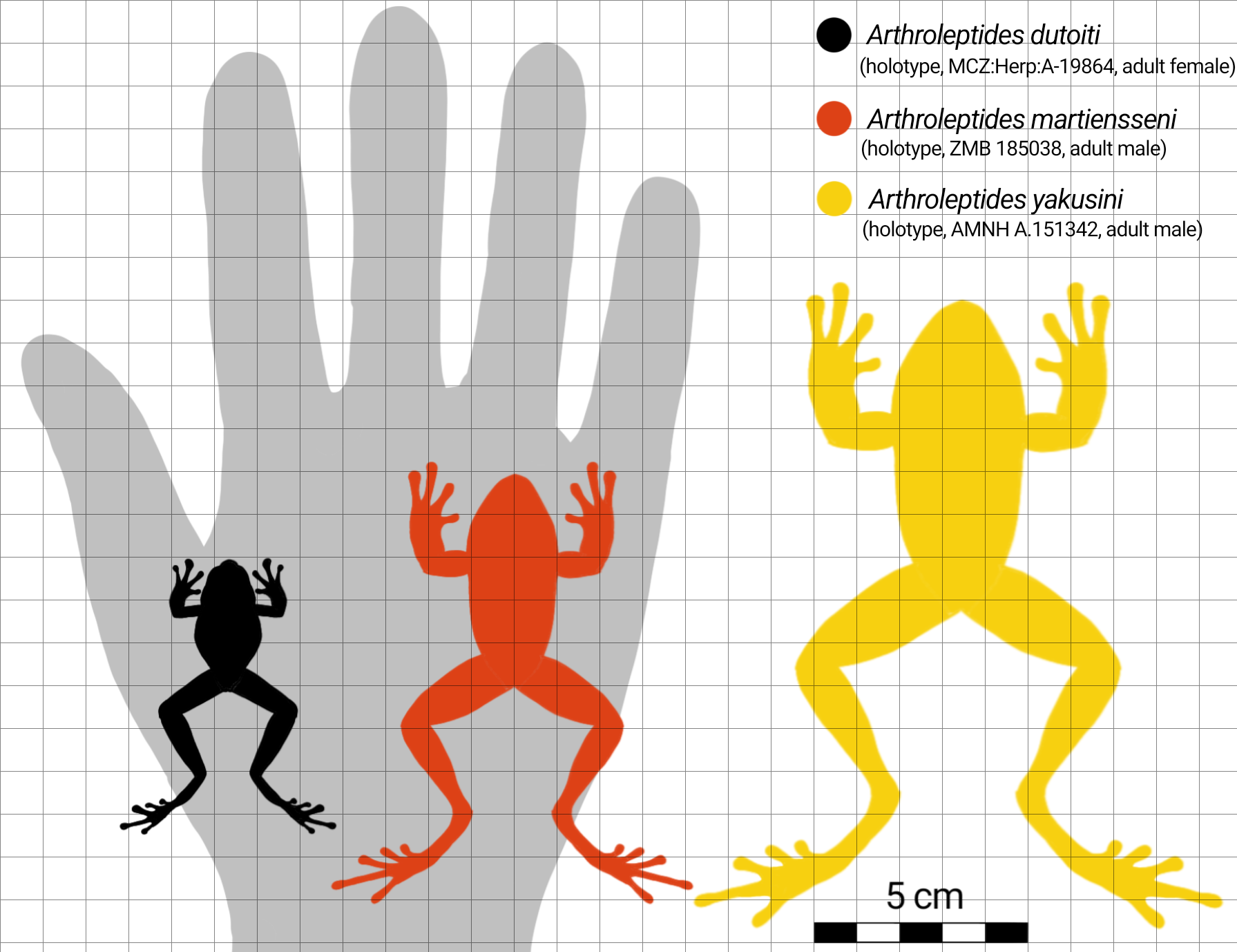
Sizes of the holotype specimens of three Arthroleptides species compared to a human hand, with the southern torrent frog shown in yellow

A large species of frog, the snout-vent length of the southern torrent frog commonly exceeds 54 mm (2.1 in), and reaches over 70 mm (2.8 in) in some exceptionally large males. Unusually for a frog, the males tend to grow larger than the females. This species has countershading coloration, with the upper surface of the body being gray-brown with mottled dark patterns while the belly and chest are pale. The limbs have similarly pale undersides, while the back of the thighs have white speckles over a darker background color. The throat is dark with speckled pale patterns, and an orange-reddish stripe passes through the upper part of the eye in many individuals. Smaller individuals may have transverse bands of color on their backs.

This frog has wide jaws, the width of which ranges between 40 and 44% of the individual's snout-vent length, and nostrils located near the front of the snout. The eyes cannot be seen when the frog is viewed from below. The tympana are dark and round, and in large males the width of each tympanum is slightly less than the distance between the front corners of the eyes. However, females and smaller males have proportionally much smaller tympana, with the width of each being only about 20% of the distance between the eyes. A fold of skin known as the supratympanic ridge covers the hind part of the upper margin of the tympana, and is almost straight when seen from the animal's side. The tips of the digits are widened into broad discs, each divided into two parts by a groove and possessing scutes on the upper surface. The lengths of the tibia and the fourth toe are about 60% and over 50% of the snout-vent length respectively. The hind feet are webbed and each have five toes with tubercles on their undersides. The webbing reaches or extends pass the proximal tubercles of the first four toes and the middle tubercle of the fifth toe, a feature distinguishing this species from the closely related Usambara torrent frog (in which the webbing extends around half as far).

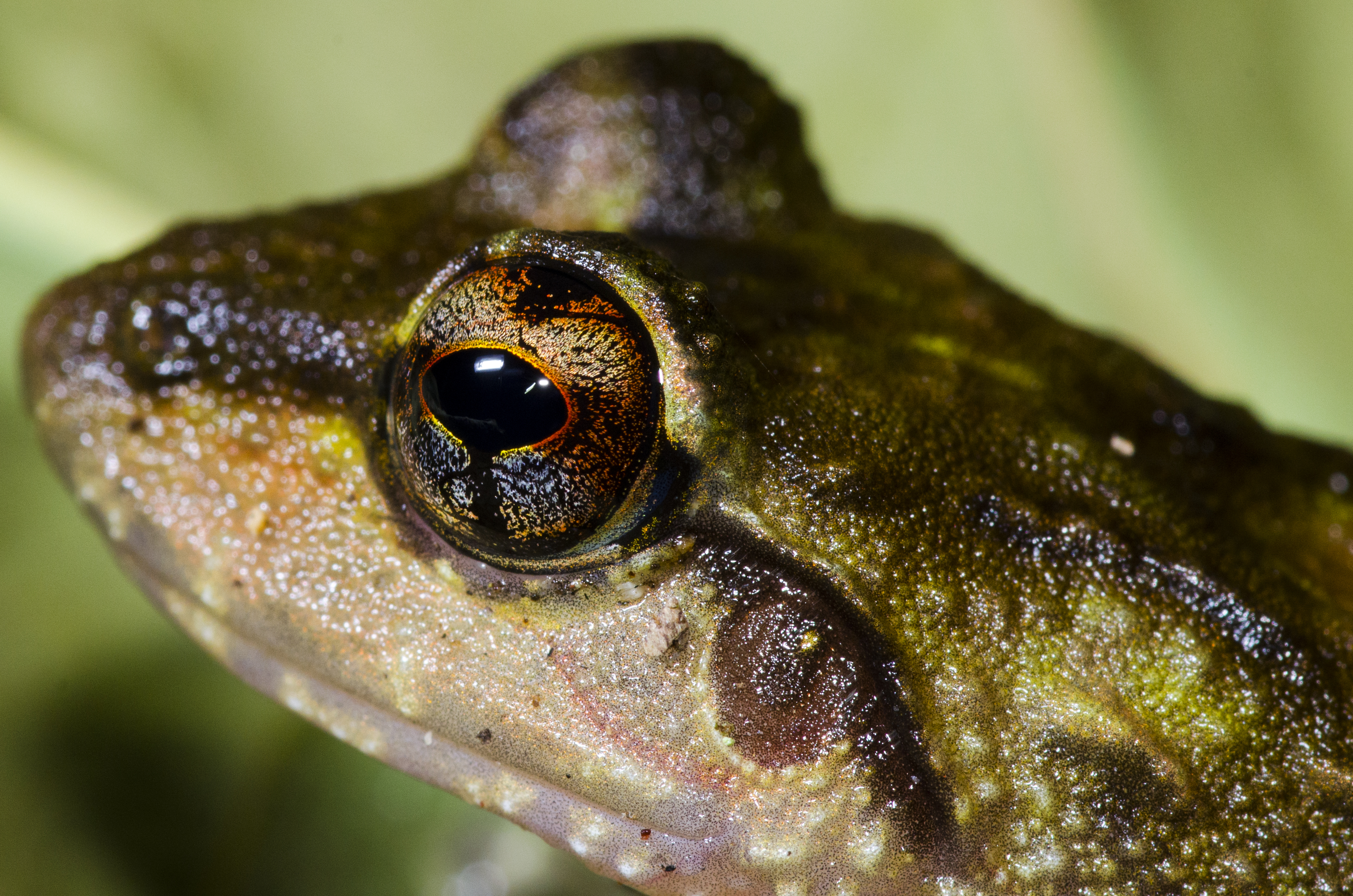
Closeup of the head

Mature breeding males of this species develop notable secondary sexual characteristics, which include spines on the throat and chin, hypertrophy of the forearms, an enlarged knob on the metacarpal area, a ring of knobs around each tympanum and a protrusion of soft tissue on each tympanum known as a tympanic papilla. These features are absent in females, smaller males and males collected outside of the breeding season. The forearms are so swollen in breeding males that they can be 1.5 times wider than the frog's eye, whereas individuals lacking these secondary sexual characteristics tend to have arm widths less than their eye diameter.

=== Tadpoles ===
The tadpoles of the southern torrent frog are semiterrestrial, hatching from eggs laid on wet rock faces outside of water and developing there rather than directly in the water like the tadpoles of most frog species. They largely resemble the tadpoles of the related Usambara torrent frog, which are also semiterrestrial. The upper surface is a dark color with pale spots and darker patterns, and nine saddle-like patches of light color stretch across the top of the tail to the sides. The underside is white, with some fine spots speckled across the belly, and the belly muscles are just clear enough that the coiled gut with five spirals is visible through them.

The main body (excluding the tail) is oval shaped, being widest in the hind area when viewed from above, and the large eyes bulge above the rest of the body. A single spiracle is visible as a small vertical slit on the left side of the body. The vent tube is rounded and located on the midline of the tadpole's underside, extending slightly beyond the hind limbs, and its opening is unconnected to the muscles of the tail. The tail of a southern torrent frog tadpole is very long, with one Gosner stage 37 tadpole measuring 27.4 mm (1.08 in) in total length having a 18.7 mm (0.74 in)-long tail, making up over 68% of its total length. At this development stage, the tail has only a very reduced dorsal fin and no ventral fin, and no external gills are present, whereas both these fins are better developed and external gills can be seen in younger tadpoles such as a Gosner stage 23 individual. Both the upper and lower jaws bear curved keratinous sheaths, with the jaws closing such that the lower jaw sheath fits within the upper sheath, similarly to the beak of a parrot. The oral disc bears lip-like flaps known as labia, which have rows of teeth. There are three upper tooth rows and three lower tooth rows, each having about 52 teeth per mm (0.039 in), with the upper rows being split in the middle to accommodate the large jaw sheath. When the oral disc is closed, the upper labium flexes to cover the lower labium, and the middle teeth of the first upper row (the A-1 row) overlap. At the hind margin of the oral disc, there is a double row of short, rounded protrusions known as papillae, which merges into a single row towards the jaw angle.

== Biology ==
The southern torrent frog is a nocturnal animal, emerging after nightfall and spending the daytime hidden in deep cracks under large rocks, with larger individuals being particularly likely to hide away in this manner at day. Based on its wide jaws, it is believed to be a predator of smaller frogs such as the common squeaker, which is common within the leaf litter of the southern torrent frog's habitat. The adult frogs can occur near stream banks or away from the water on the leaf litter of the forest floor, where their coloration provides excellent camouflage. They are capable of large leaps and sometimes seen sitting on rocks covered with shallow water in fast-flowing streams, where they can quickly flee with the current downstream if threatened. Smaller, non-adult frogs can be found near streams in small pools, on the leaves of plants or in the crevices of vertical rock or soil faces, and have been noted to peer at observers and move deeper into these crevices upon being disturbed. Subadult and juvenile individuals are reportedly active mostly in rivers and on the forest floor, though one has been seen perched 1 m (3 ft 3 in) above the ground in a small tree.

A variety of diseases are known to occur in this species, with one study sampling 60 southern torrent frogs from Kihansi gorge in the Udzungwa Mountains and finding that 60% of these individuals had some form of disease condition. The most prevalent condition among this species was strongyloidiasis, a disease caused by nematode worms parasitizing the intestines, occurring in over 20% of the sampled southern torrent frogs. Viral and fungal infections were also recorded, including chytridiomycosis, a disease caused by fungus Batrachochytrium dendrobatidis that has caused a drastic decline in amphibian populations worldwide. However, these diseases are not always fatal to the amphibian, and healthy southern torrent frogs have been found with infections of this fungus, suggesting that some individuals can harbor the pathogen without developing the disease. Nutritional status is also known to be linked to the outcome of nematode infection in amphibians, and the wide range of diet resources available to wild southern torrent frogs likely helps them avoid developing nematode-related clinical diseases.

=== Life cycle ===
After the short rains begin in November, adult males of this species start producing advertisement calls at night to attract mates, and may do so from the ground or atop rocks or fallen tree trunks. The advertisement call is made up of a series of "wauk" sounds, which are repeated at long intervals of as much as 25 seconds. Four to eight pulses comprise the call, which last from 30.6 to 81.2 milliseconds, and ranges from 1.2 to 1.4 kilohertz in emphasized frequency. The female lays her eggs on vertical or sloping rock surfaces covered with a film of water, which may be produced either by the drifting spray of a waterfall or natural drainage. The eggs are dark in color, camouflaging them against the dark rocks they are deposited on, and occur either in small clusters of four to five or large aggregations of around 200. Each egg measures about 2 mm (0.079 in) in diameter and is enclosed in a 4 mm (0.16 in) capsule. After hatching, the tadpoles do not directly enter the water and instead remain on the wet rocks, where they graze on algae and may occur in densities as high as 22 individuals per square meter (10.764 square feet). At the age of 8 to 10 weeks, metamorphosis is complete and the tail is reabsorbed, at which point the juvenile frogs move into forest leaf litter and vegetation near streams after leaving their nursery rock.

== Conservation ==
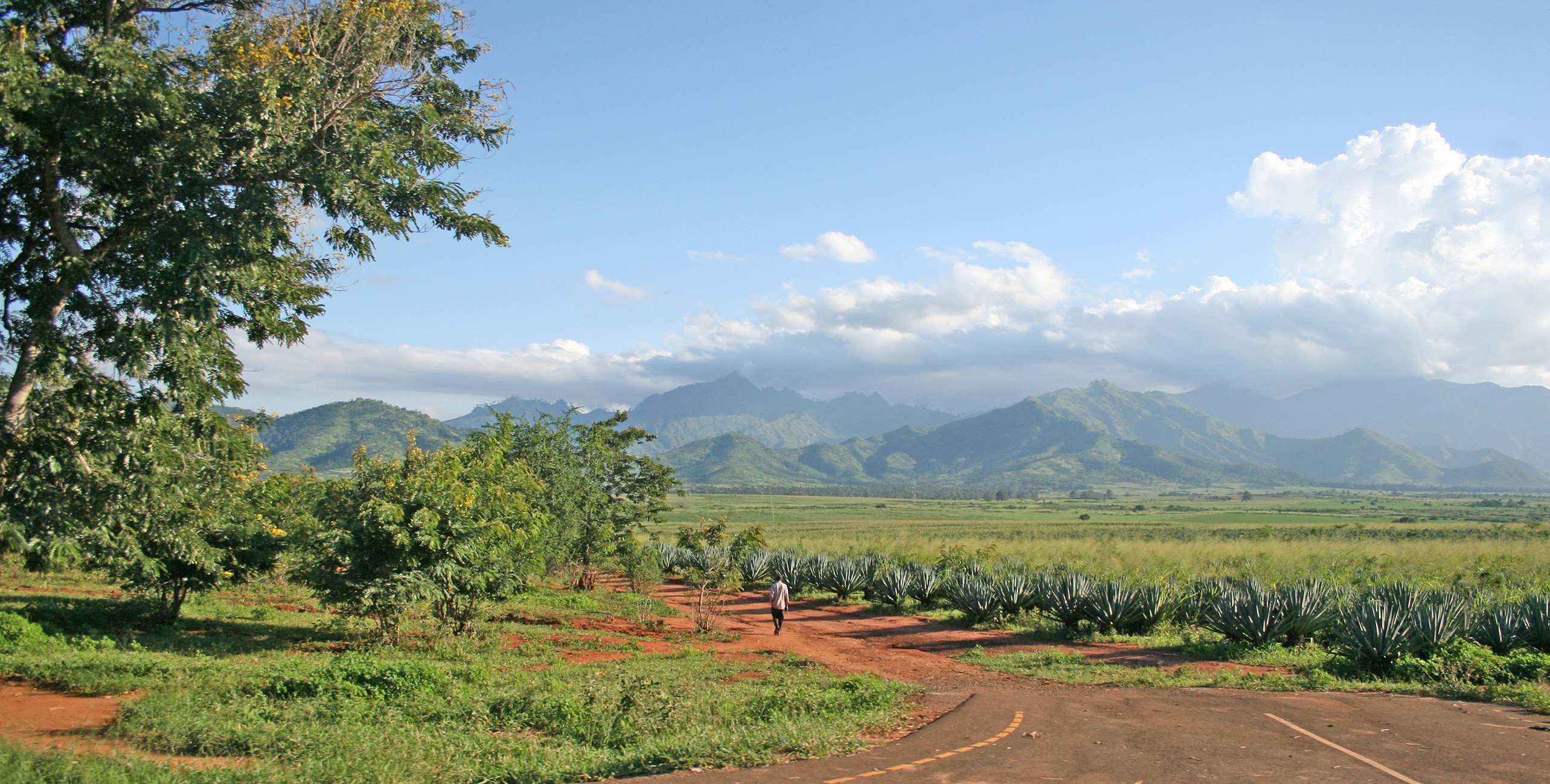
Agricultural land near the Uluguru Mountains

The conservation status of the southern torrent frog was assessed by the IUCN in 2013, and it was listed as an Endangered species. Although the species remains locally common in areas of suitable habitat and parts of the frog's range have been designated as protected areas including the Mkingu Nature Forest Reserve, Uluguru Nature Forest Reserve and Udzungwa Mountains National Park, its distribution is severely fragmented and the extent of available forest habitat in its range is declining due to the encroachment of agriculture. The pathogenic fungus Batrachochytrium dendrobatidis, which causes the disease chytridiomycosis in infected amphibians, has been recorded in southern torrent frogs, though at least some individuals appear to be capable of harboring the fungus without falling ill. Still, populations of this frog will require close monitoring to consider the potential impact of the disease.

== See also ==
- Wildlife of Tanzania
