= Petropedetes palmipes =

Conservation status
- Vulnerable (IUCN 3.1)

Scientific classification
- Kingdom: Animalia
- Phylum: Chordata
- Class: Amphibia
- Order: Anura
- Family: Petropedetidae
- Genus: Petropedetes
- Species: P. palmipes

Binomial name
- Petropedetes palmipes Boulenger, 1905

Species of frog

Petropedetes palmipes is a species of frog in the family Petropedetidae. It is known from a few localities in southwestern Cameroon, Equatorial Guinea, and western Gabon. Common name Efulen water frog has been coined for it.

== Taxonomy ==
In 1905, Belgian-British zoologist George Albert Boulenger published a study in which he described three new species of frogs discovered in Africa, one of which was established based on several specimens collected by American naturalist George Latimer Bates in the town of Efoulan (spelled as Efulen by Boulenger), Cameroon. Boulenger gave this species the scientific name Petropedetes palmipes, placing it in the genus Petropedetes which he had studied a few years previously. The specimens studied by Boulenger are kept in the Natural History Museum in London and have been designated as the syntypes of the species. The common names "Efulen water frog" and "white-spotted torrent frog" have been used to refer to P. palmipes.

The genus Petropedetes belongs in the family Petropedetidae, which also includes the East African genus Arthroleptides. According to a phylogenetic study published in 2014, Petropedetes palmipes diverged from the other living species of Petropedetes early on in the evolution of the genus, having been recovered at a sister taxon position to the clade containing all other species of the genus. The following cladogram shows the position of this species among its closest relatives according to the study:

- - Petropedetidae
    - Arthroleptides
      - A. martiensseni
      - - A. sp. nov.
        - A. yakusini
    - Petropedetes
      - P. palmipes
      - - P. sp. nov.
        - - - P. perreti
            - P. juliawurstnerae
          - - P. cameronensis
            - - - P. euskircheni
                - P. aff. euskercheni
              - - P. parkeri
                - - P. vulpiae
                  - - P. sp. nov. 2
                    - - P. sp. nov. 3
                      - P. johnstoni

== Description ==
Adult males measure 40–58 mm (1.6–2.3 in) and adult females 38–55 mm (1.5–2.2 in) in snout–urostyle length. The body is robust. The snout is relatively more pointed than in other Petropedetes. The tympanum is very small and indistinct whereas the supratympanic fold is distinct. The fingers are slender and have typically T-shaped tips. The fingers have no webbing whereas the toes are fully webbed. The dorsum is uniformly dark green and black with some tiny pale spots. Adults can be glossy black and difficult to see among wet stones. The upper hinds limbs have faint crossbars. The throat is whitish or dark marbled.

The tadpoles are flat-bodied with large eyes and a long, pointed tail. They are grey, turning darker with age, but translucent ventrally. The largest tadpoles are 35 mm (1.4 in) in total length.

== Habitat and conservation ==
Petropedetes palmipes occurs in rocky areas in lowland forest, usually near flowing water, at elevations up to 469 m (1,539 ft) above sea level. The eggs are clued to rocks outside water, although eggs and tadpoles have also been found submerged.

Petropedetes palmipes is a rare species that does not tolerate much modification of its forest habitat. It is, presumably, threatened by habitat loss caused by agriculture, logging and human settlements. It is found in the Monte Alen National Park in Equatorial Guinea and in the Crystal Mountains National Park in Gabon.
