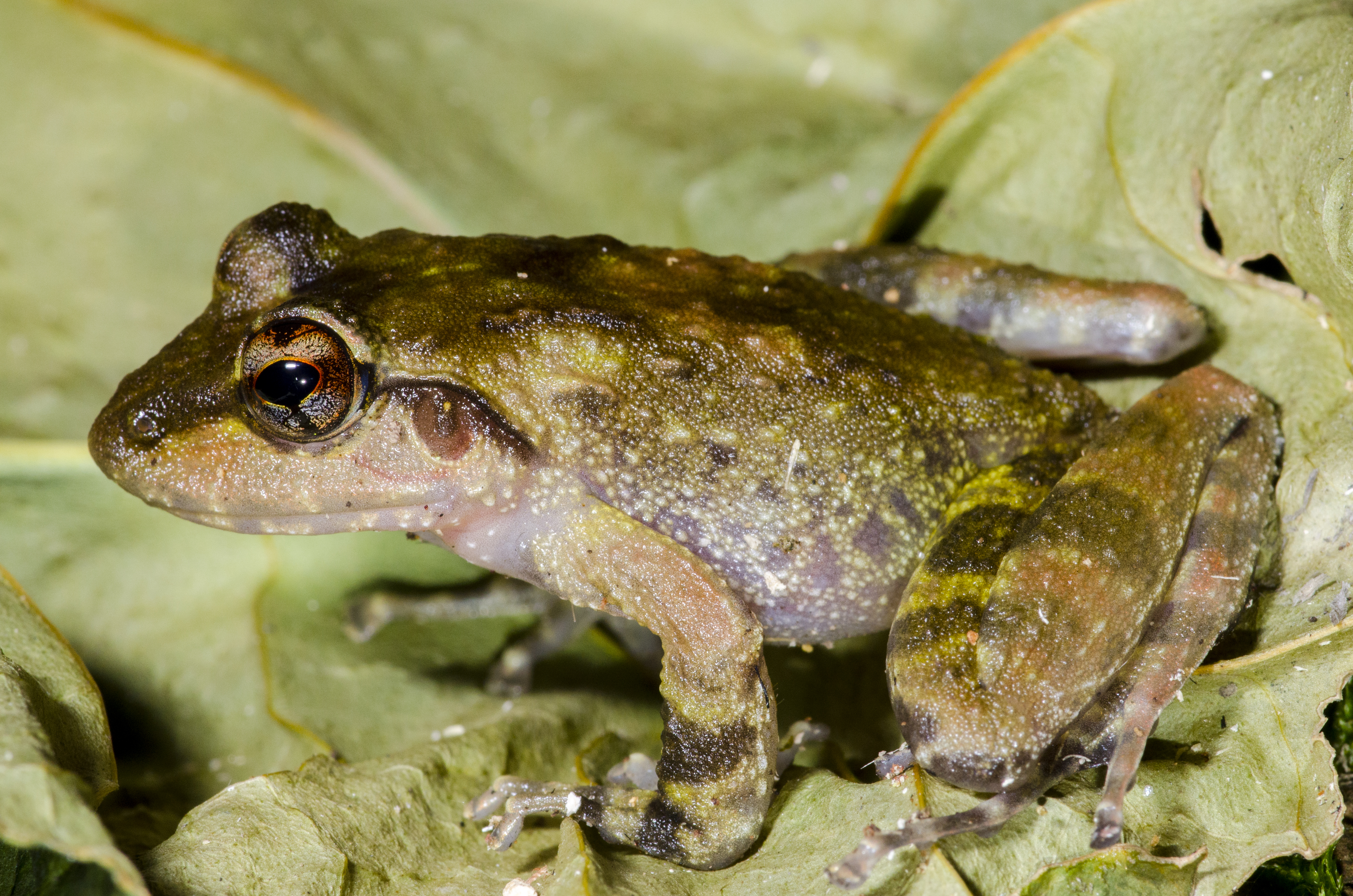
- Southern torrent frog (Arthroleptides yakusini)

Scientific classification
- Kingdom: Animalia
- Phylum: Chordata
- Class: Amphibia
- Order: Anura
- Family: Petropedetidae
- Genus: Arthroleptides; Nieden, 1911 "1910"

Type species
- Arthroleptides martiensseni Nieden, 1911 "1910"

Species
- Arthroleptides dutoiti; Arthroleptides martiensseni; Arthroleptides yakusini

= Arthroleptides =

Genus of amphibians

Arthroleptides is a small genus of frogs in the family Petropedetidae. Their common name is rocky river frogs. They are found in the mountains of East Africa (Tanzania, Kenya, and probably Uganda). They have been considered to belong to Petropedetes, which after exclusion of Arthroleptides is restricted to Central Africa.

Arthroleptides species have distinct tympana and no external vocal sacs. Males have femoral glands, and in the breeding state, spiny nuptial excrescences. Tadpoles live on wet rocks out of water.

== Taxonomy and systematics ==
The genus Arthroleptides was first established by German zoologist Fritz Nieden in 1911 after studying three specimens in the collection of the Berlin Zoological Museum. These specimens represented a single species and were collected two years prior in Amani, Muheza, Tanzania by herpetologist Paul Krefft and military commander Georg Martienssen. Nieden observed that the specimens bear some resemblance to frogs of the genera Arthroleptis and Petropedetes, yet also differed significantly enough from both that they belonged in a separate genus. He therefore established a new genus for this species, which he named Arthroleptides martiensseni, with the generic name referencing the animal's similarities to Arthroleptis.

Nieden initially placed Arthroleptides within the family Ranidae, commonly referred to as the "true frogs". In 1931, American zoologist G.K. Noble established Petropedetinae as a subfamily within Ranidae and assigned the two genera Arthroleptides and Petropedetes into it. The two genera were united based on the fact that members of both possess a pair of dermal scutes on the upper surface of each digit, though they could be distinguished from each other by the fact that species of Arthroleptides lack vomerine teeth, a feature present in Petropedetes species. Later in 2006, Petropedetinae was elevated to family status and renamed as Petropedetidae. A paper published in 2005 concluded that the presence or absence of vomerine teeth can vary within a genus and is not significant enough a difference to warrant separation of Arthroleptides and Petropedetes into different genera. Because Petropedetes was named first, Arthroleptides was declared a junior synonym of it, and the species assigned to Arthroleptides were moved into Petropedetes. However, a phylogenetic study published in 2014 discovered that the Arthroleptides species do indeed form a monophyletic clade separate from the other Petropedetes species, and thus resurrected Arthroleptides as a valid taxon. The following cladogram shows the position of this genus within the family Petropedetidae according to the study:

- - Petropedetidae
    - Arthroleptides
      - A. martiensseni
      - - A. sp. nov.
        - A. yakusini
    - Petropedetes
      - P. palmipes
      - - P. sp. nov.
        - - - P. perreti
            - P. juliawurstnerae
          - - P. cameronensis
            - - - P. euskircheni
                - P. aff. euskercheni
              - - P. parkeri
                - - P. vulpiae
                  - - P. sp. nov. 2
                    - - P. sp. nov. 3
                      - P. johnstoni

=== Species ===
At the time it was established by Nieden, Arthroleptides was a monotypic taxon containing only A. martiensseni, and thus it was designated as the type species of the genus. However, later authors have assigned additional species to this genus. The three currently named species are:

Species	Taxon author	Common name(s)	Geographic range	IUCN status
A. dutoiti	Loveridge, 1935	Du Toit's torrent frog, Mt. Elgon torrent frog, Kenya rocky river frog	Kenyan side of Mount Elgon, possibly also occurs on the Ugandan side	[[Critically Endangered|CR]]
A. martiensseni	Nieden, 1911 "1910"	Usambara torrent frog, Martienssen's torrent frog, Tanzania rocky river frog	Usambara Mountains, Tanzania	[[Endangered|EN]]
A. yakusini	Channing, Moyer and Howell, 2002	Southern torrent frog	Uluguru, Udzungwa and Mahenge mountains, Tanzania	[[Endangered|EN]]

In addition, molecular evidence suggests that an undescribed species exists in the Nguru Mountains.
