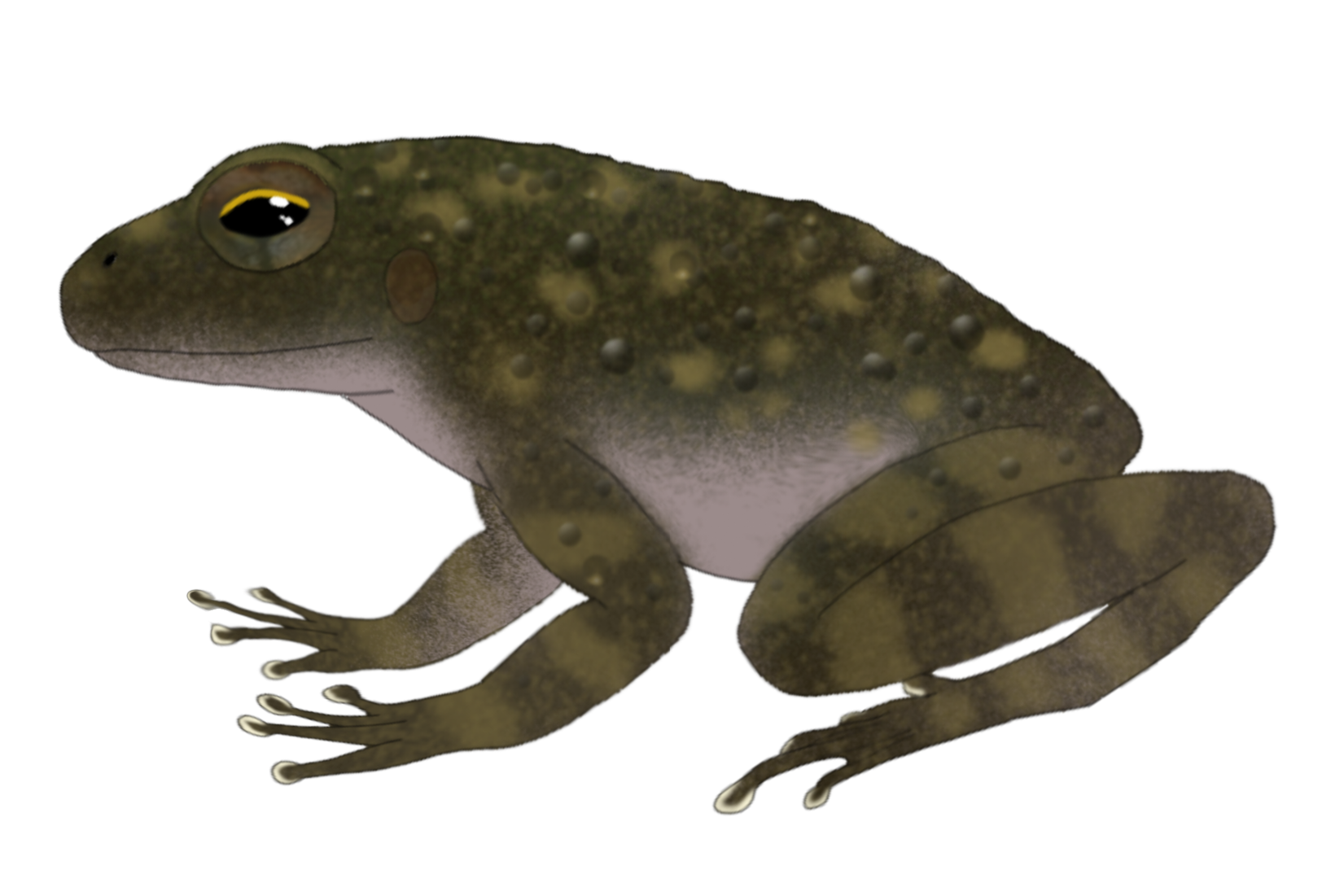
- Life restoration of an adult, with coloration reconstructed based on field notes of Ronalda Keith's 1962 sightings of the species

Conservation status
- Critically Endangered (IUCN 3.1)

Scientific classification
- Kingdom: Animalia
- Phylum: Chordata
- Class: Amphibia
- Order: Anura
- Family: Petropedetidae
- Genus: Arthroleptides
- Species: A. dutoiti

Binomial name
- Arthroleptides dutoiti Loveridge, 1935

Synonyms
- Petropedetes dutoiti (Loveridge, 1935)

= Du Toit's torrent frog =

Species of amphibian

Du Toit's torrent frog, the Mt. Elgon torrent frog, or the Kenya rocky river frog (Arthroleptides dutoiti) is a possibly extinct species of frog in the family Petropedetidae. It is endemic to Mount Elgon, where it has been observed along fast-flowing montane streams surrounded by dense forest in Kenya; it has not been found on the Ugandan part of the mountain, but is expected to occur in more localities than those it has been found in. This species rests on rocks and logs near these streams, sometimes hanging to them like an insect, or in the water beneath them, and is a capable swimmer. It is one of numerous species of frog commonly described by the polyphyletic designator "torrent frog".

This frog is small, with the holotype individual growing 31 mm (1.2 in) in snout–vent length, and has warty and pitted skin on its back but smooth skin elsewhere. The digits are widened into disks at the tips, with webbing between the toes but not the fingers that extends halfway down the toes. The coloration of live individuals is reportedly dark gray or black with speckles on the upper surface, and lighter gray with spots on the underside, with vertical bands on the legs, a golden line over the iris, triangular patterns on the snout, white edges on the digit tips and a line of pale dots over the anus. The males are known to make calls from sheltered areas during the rainy season and occupy territories of at least 5 sq in (32.3 cm^{2}). The large, pigmented eggs each measure around 3 mm (0.1 in) and are presumably laid on wet rocks where the tadpoles develop, rather than directly in the water.

The species is named after Cornelius Albertus du Toit, who discovered the species in 1934 while conducting a reptile and amphibian survey along the Koitobos River, during which he collected the holotype specimen and two other individuals. The only other known sighting of this species was in 1962, when Ronalda Keith found a population at the Suam River. Despite repeated surveys conducted on Mount Elgon from 2001 onwards, the Du Toit's torrent frog has not been recorded since Keith's sighting and has been feared extinct, though evidence remains insufficient to officially declare it as such. While the exact causes of its decline remain uncertain, habitat loss and the fungal disease chytridiomycosis have been proposed as threats to the species.

== Discovery and naming ==
From 1933 to 1934, the Museum of Comparative Zoology conducted surveys of the reptiles and amphibians in the rainforests of Kenya and Uganda. During a survey on January 8, 1934, Cornelius Albertus du Toit discovered a species of frog in the Koitobos River on the eastern slopes of Mount Elgon in Kenya, about 7,200 ft (2,194.6 m) above sea level. He collected three individuals, which would later be studied and recognized as a new species by British biologist Arthur Loveridge in 1935. Loveridge named the preserved species Arthroleptides dutoiti after its discoverer, designating a gravid female specimen as the holotype of the species, while the other two specimens (an adult male and a young individual) were designated as paratypes. The species was next recorded in April 1962, when US herpetologist Ronalda Keith collected an additional eight individuals about 7,000 ft (2,133.6 m) above sea level at the Suam River, around 10 km (6.2 miles) from the type locality, and recorded her observations on the frogs in her field book. The specimens collected by Keith have been placed in the collection of the American Museum of Natural History.

A 2005 study declared the genus Arthroleptides to be a junior synonym of Petropedetes, thus renaming this species as Petropedetes dutoiti. However, the former genus was resurrected as a valid taxon in 2014, so the original scientific name of this species was reinstated.

== Distribution and habitat ==
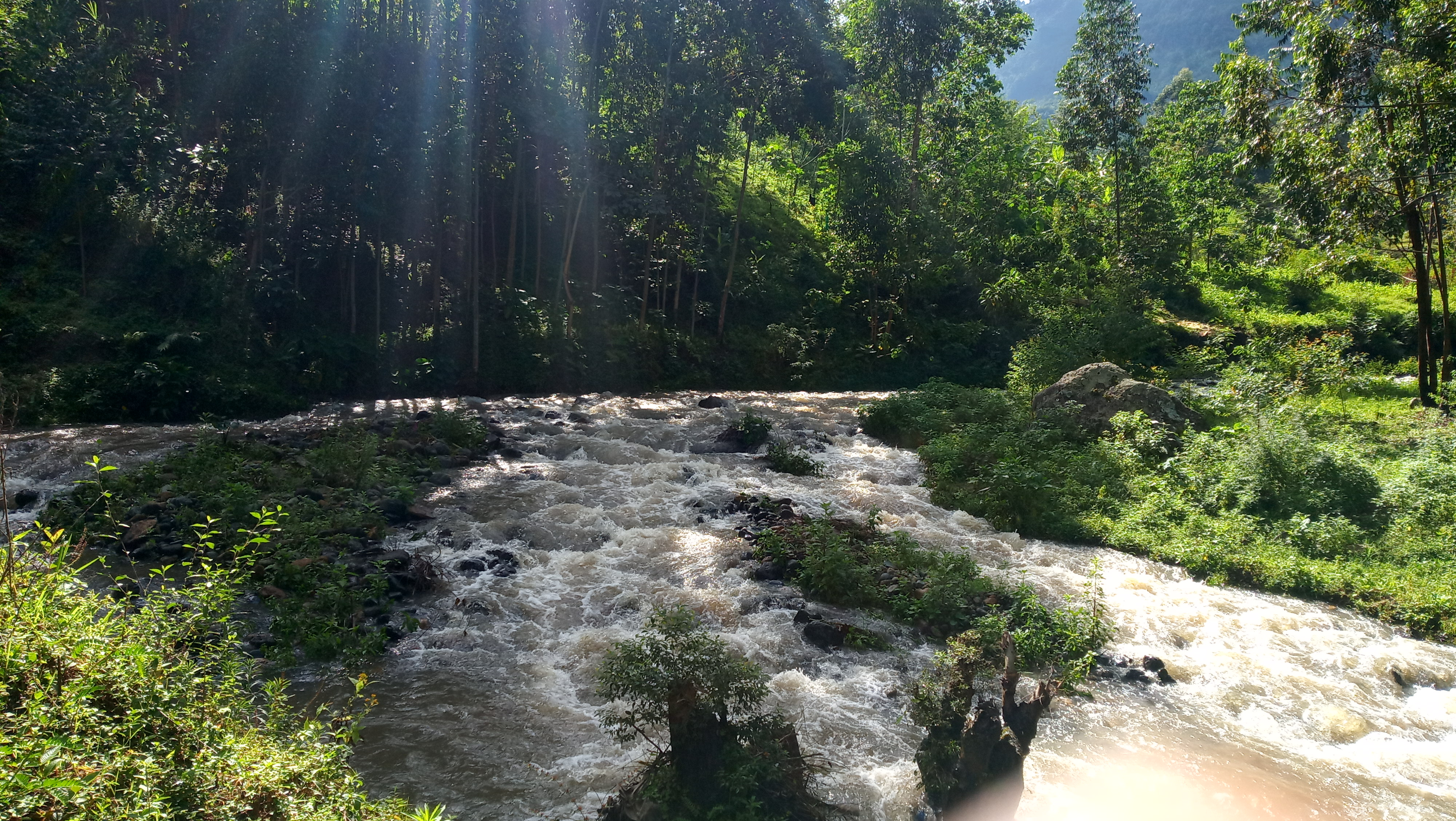
View of a montane stream on Mount Elgon

The Du Toit's torrent frog is endemic to Mount Elgon, with the only known sightings recorded from the Koitobos and Suam rivers between 2,100–2,200 m (6,889.8–7,217.8 ft) above sea level on the Kenyan side of the mountain, though it is expected to occur in other sites on both the Kenyan and Ugandan sides. As such, the species has a small extent of occurrence of only 973 km^{2} (375.7 sq mi). The frog's natural habitat consists of rocky streams with cold, fast-flowing water surrounded by dense montane forest. However, surveys from 2001 to 2014 in both the wet and dry seasons have failed to record the species on Mount Elgon, and it has likely been extirpated from the surveyed locations (including the locations it had formerly been observed in), or possibly become extinct entirely.

== Description ==
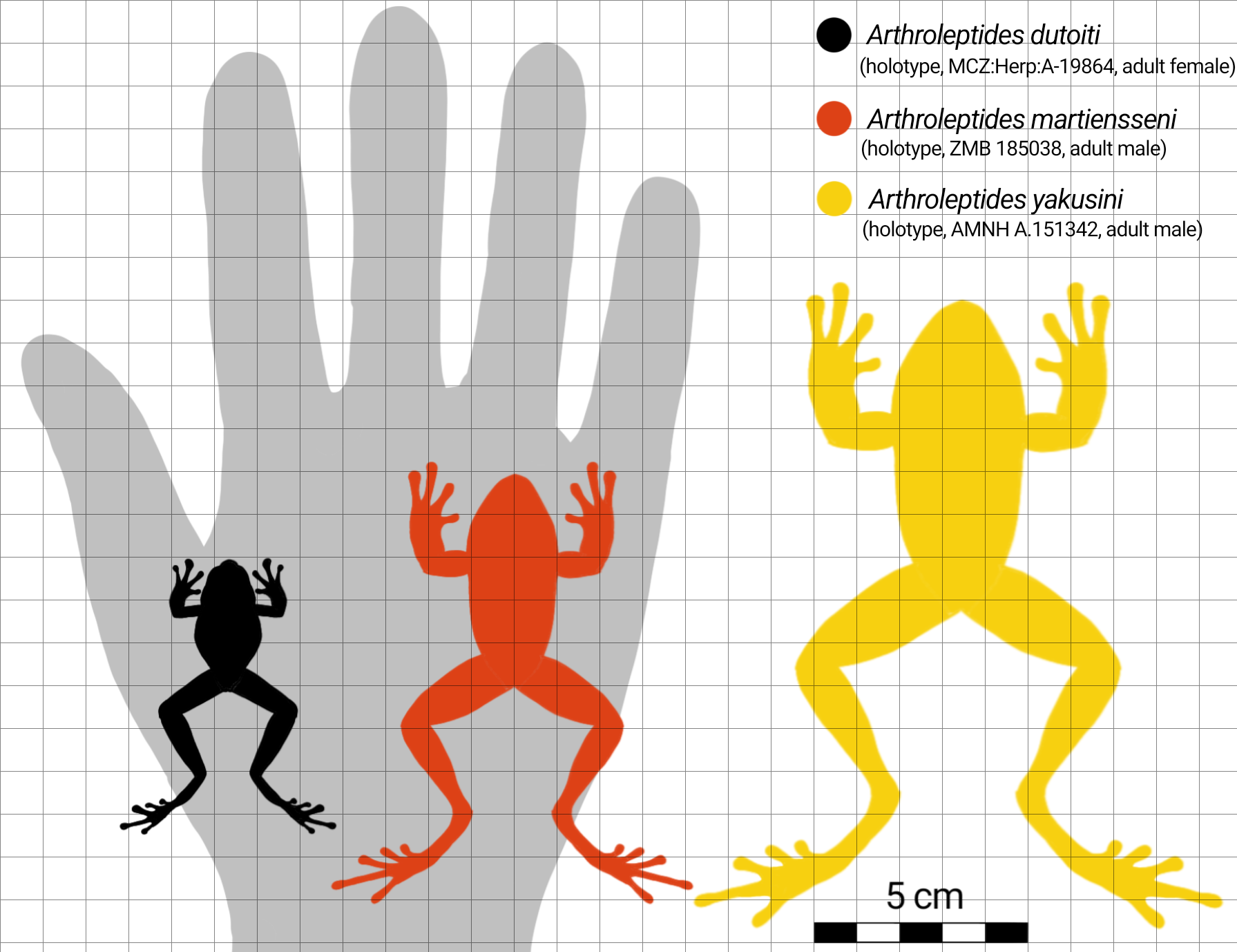
Sizes of the holotype specimens of three Arthroleptides species compared to a human hand, with the Du Toit's torrent frog shown in black

This species is a small frog, with the adult female type specimen collected in 1934 measuring 31 mm (1.2 in) in snout-vent length, and the adult male paratype specimen being slightly smaller, with a snout-vent length of only 25 mm (0.98 in). The head is moderately wider than it is long, with distinctly visible tympana, each with a diameter a little less than two thirds that of the eyes. No vomerine teeth are present in this species. The snout tapers slightly, with nostrils located midway between the eyes and the snout tip, and a very prominent canthal ridge. The width of the upper eyelids is approximately equal to the distance between the eyes. The digits widen at the tips to form disks, which each possess a groove down the middle. The feet are webbed, with webbing stretching halfway down the toes, but none is present between the fingers. The hind legs are long, exceeding the snout-vent length, and in the male paratype specimen are twice the snout-vent length. The skin is distinctly pitted and warty on the animal's back, but smooth elsewhere on the body.

The coloration of live individuals was recorded by Ronalda Keith in her field book when seeing this species in 1962, writing that they are mostly dark grey or black with speckled patterns on their upper surface. These speckles are usually khaki but can vary in color, sometimes being more greenish grey in juveniles, dark grayish black in females or tanish grey in males. The iris is horizontal, with a golden line above it. The underside is lighter, being grey with blue spots in females, and a lighter shade of grey with brown spots in males. A line of pale dots is present over the anus, as are triangular patterns on the snout between the eyes and nostrils. The legs possess vertical bands of color, which are more prominent in juveniles, and the edges of the digit tips are slightly white.

== Biology ==
Like other members of the genus Arthroleptides, the Du Toit's torrent frog occurs in and around rocky montane streams, with the dark, mottled color of this species providing camouflage against the volcanic rocks in its habitat. Upon finding live individuals in 1962, Ronalda Keith recorded that the frogs would sit on rocks or in the water beneath overhanging rocks, particularly favoring long wet moss growing on rocks and logs as sitting locations, and would even sometimes hang from rocks and roots like in insect. The amphibians are powerful swimmers, capable of emerging onto rocks several feet away after diving into rapids and whirlpools. Keith observed the frogs for five days in the rainy season, during which she documented the male frogs calling from shelters in the banks and logs for the entire duration of her observation, each occupying a territory of at least 5 sq in (32.3 cm^{2}), while the female and juveniles frogs remained in the water. The species is oviparous, with an adult female kept in captivity by Keith recorded to have laid around 12 eggs, each encased in a strong jelly-like substance and adhered to each other to form a blob. The eggs are rather large, around 3 mm (0.1 in), and are pigmented. Although eggs and tadpoles have not been observed in the wild, it is presumed that since the streams this frog inhabits lack shallow, quiet backwaters, the eggs are laid on wet rocks close to torrential streams and waterfalls, and the tadpoles develop out of the water on the rocks, as this is the case for closely related species such as the southern torrent frog and Usambara torrent frog.

== Conservation ==
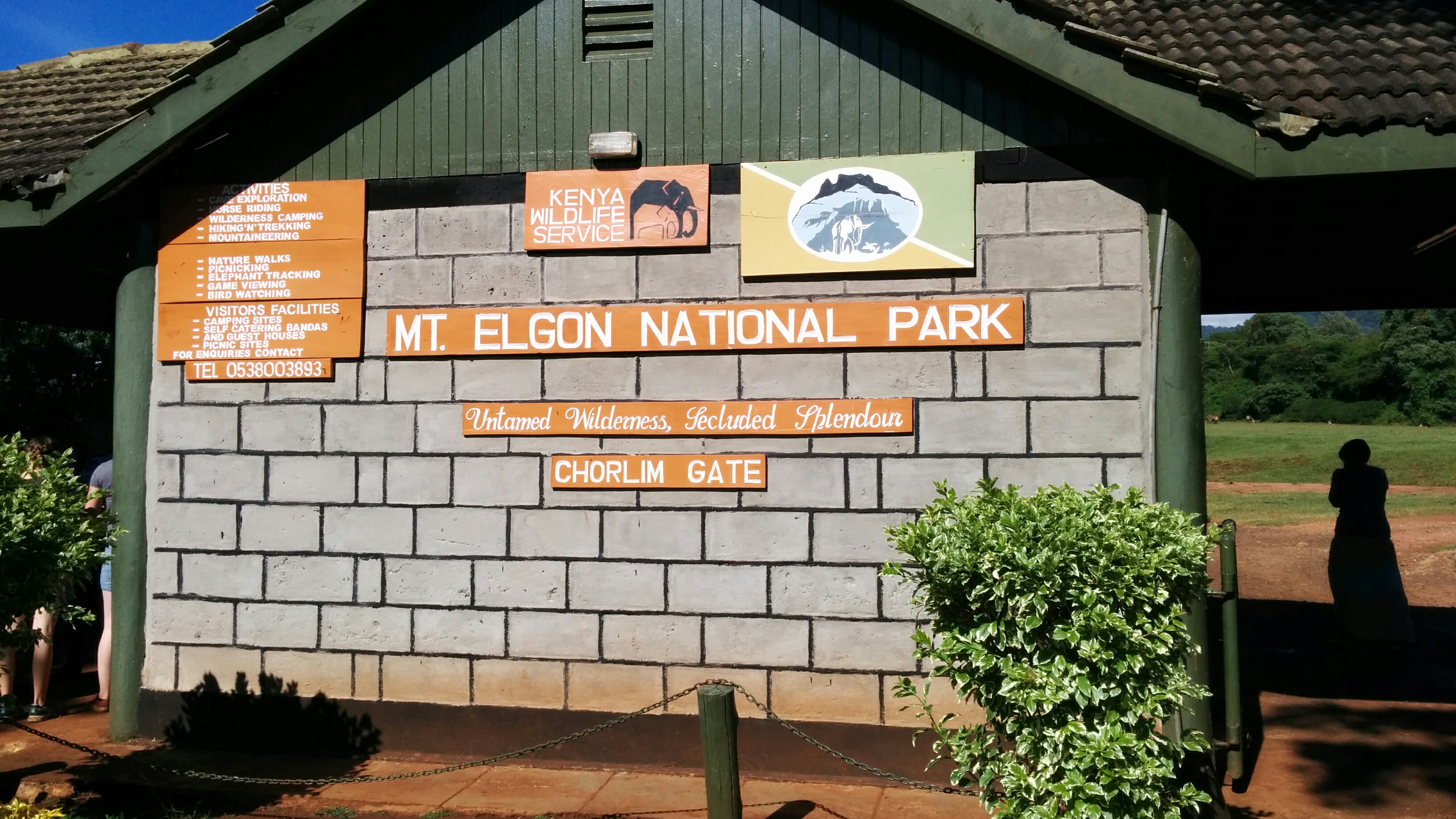
Entrance to Mount Elgon National Park, a protected site containing areas of potential habitat for the Du Toit's torrent frog

Last seen in 1962 despite repeated later surveys, the Du Toit's torrent frog has been feared extinct, and was listed as such by the IUCN in 1994 and 1996. However, the organization's later assessments in 2004 and 2016 listed it as Critically Endangered instead, stating that evidence is lacking to formally declare it extinct, and inferring that if any individuals still exist, there would be fewer than 250 mature adults occurring in a single location. A study published in 2021 concluded that this frog has likely become locally extinct from the areas that have been repeatedly surveyed, but additional sampling is required to determine if it has become extinct entirely. Although the exact causes of the decline of this species remains unknown, habitat loss has been proposed to be a major factor. While areas of suitable habitat for this frog still exist within protected areas such as Mount Elgon National Park and those managed by the Kenya Forest Service, the forests of Mount Elgon remain threatened by logging, shifting cultivation, agrochemical use and charcoal burning. The fungal disease chytridiomycosis may also pose a threat, considering its linkage to dramatic declines in amphibian populations worldwide. Further surveys are required to assess the status of this frog and should extend to other, unsampled areas of Mount Elgon, particularly in the frog's preferred microhabitats. Additionally, the Du Toit's torrent frog has been listed as an EDGE species, reflecting its evolutionary distinctness and endangered status, and the EDGE Fellowship program has supported projects to assess its range and population.
