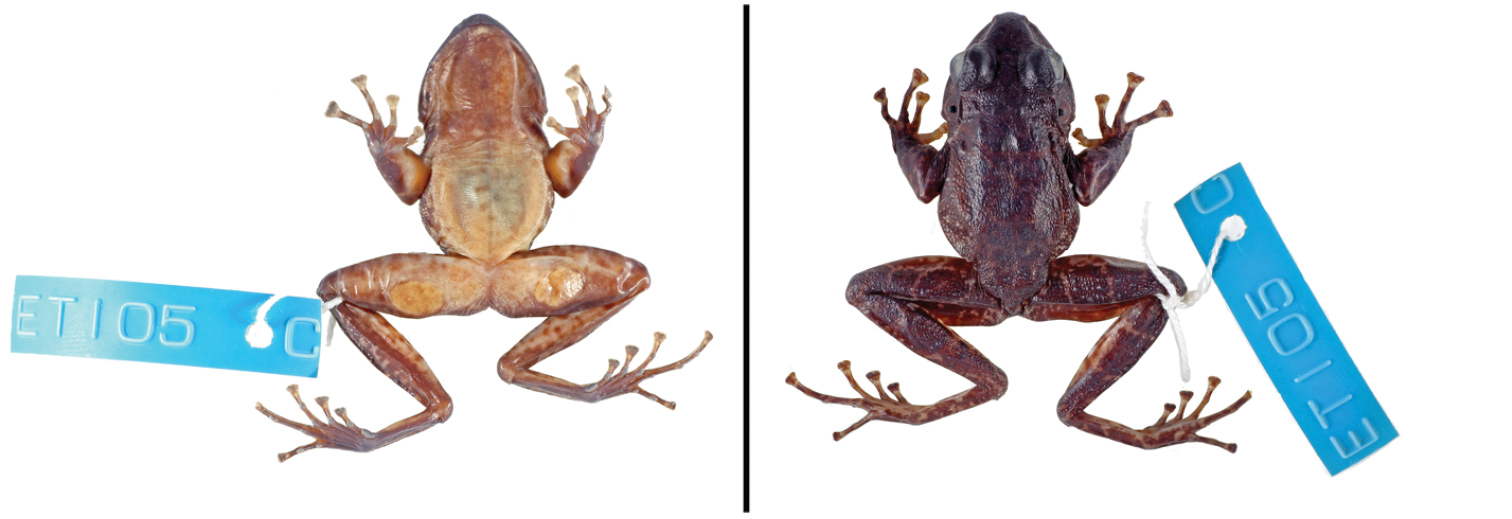

Conservation status
- Vulnerable (IUCN 3.1)

Scientific classification
- Kingdom: Animalia
- Phylum: Chordata
- Class: Amphibia
- Order: Anura
- Family: Petropedetidae
- Genus: Petropedetes
- Species: P. newtonii

Binomial name
- Petropedetes newtonii (Bocage, 1895)

Synonyms
- Tympanoceros newtonii Bocage, 1895; Petropedetes newtoni (Bocage, 1895)

= Petropedetes newtonii =

Species of frog

Petropedetes newtonii is a species of frog in the family Petropedetidae. It is found in the island of Bioko (Equatorial Guinea) and in coastal Cameroon. It has been confused with Petropedetes vulpiae and Petropedetes johnstoni, and also considered a synonym of the latter. Because the holotype of Petropedetes newtonii is lost, a neotype was designated in 2018. Common name Newton's water frog has been coined for it.

== Etymology ==
The specific name newtonii honours Francisco Xavier Oakley de Aguiar Newton, a Portuguese botanist who collected in Africa in the 1880s.

== Description ==
Adult males measure 33–35 mm (1.3–1.4 in) and adult females 30–41 mm (1.2–1.6 in) in snout–vent length. The body is relatively robust. The head is moderately triangular and slightly wider than in it is long. The snout is relatively pointed. The eye is large. The tympanum is distinct, smaller than the eye. The finger and the toe tips are expanded into heart-shaped discs; the fingers have no webbing whereas the toes may have rudimentary webbing. Dorsal skin bears scattered pustules. Preserved specimens are dorsally brown and ventrally white. Males shave hypertrophied forearms, dorsal spine on the distal edge of the metacarpal of the first finger, keratinised spicules on arms and tympanic borders, large thenar tubercle, and well-developed humeral crest.

== Habitat and conservation ==
Petropedetes newtonii is known from scattered locations on Bioko from near sea level to 1,000 m (3,300 ft) above sea level and from coastal Cameroon. Adults are found in and near streams (within two meters distance), but juveniles might occur away from water. Specimens can be found on stream banks, rocks, or low in vegetation, but occasionally perched as high as 1.8 m (6 ft) above the water.

The conservation status of Petropedetes newtonii, as currently defined, has not been assessed.
