= Amolops australis =

Conservation status
- Endangered (IUCN 3.1)

Scientific classification
- Kingdom: Animalia
- Phylum: Chordata
- Class: Amphibia
- Order: Anura
- Family: Ranidae
- Genus: Amolops
- Species: A. australis

Binomial name
- Amolops australis Chan, Abraham, Grismer & Grismer, 2018

Species of true frog

Amolops australis is a species of true frog that is found in the southern parts of Peninsular Malaysia. The author proposed the common name "southern torrent frog", which is a name shared by Arthroleptides yakusini.

== Description ==
There is no data about how it looks in life. In preservative it is light grey on the dorsal side and light and yellowish on the ventral side. Feet are brown on both sides. The SVL in males is 28.7–32.7 mm (1.13–1.29 in) and 45.8–47 mm (1.80–1.85 in) which sows clear sexual dimorphism.

== Distribution ==
It can be found in Endau-Rompin National Park and Bantang River Amenity Forest in the state of Johor. It may be more widely distributed but this has not yet been proven. The holotype was found at an elevation of 103 metres (338 ft) asl. They have an elevation range of 0–400 metres (0–1,312 ft).

== Etymology ==
The species name "australis" means "southern" in Latin, because it is found in the southern part of Peninsular Malaysia.
