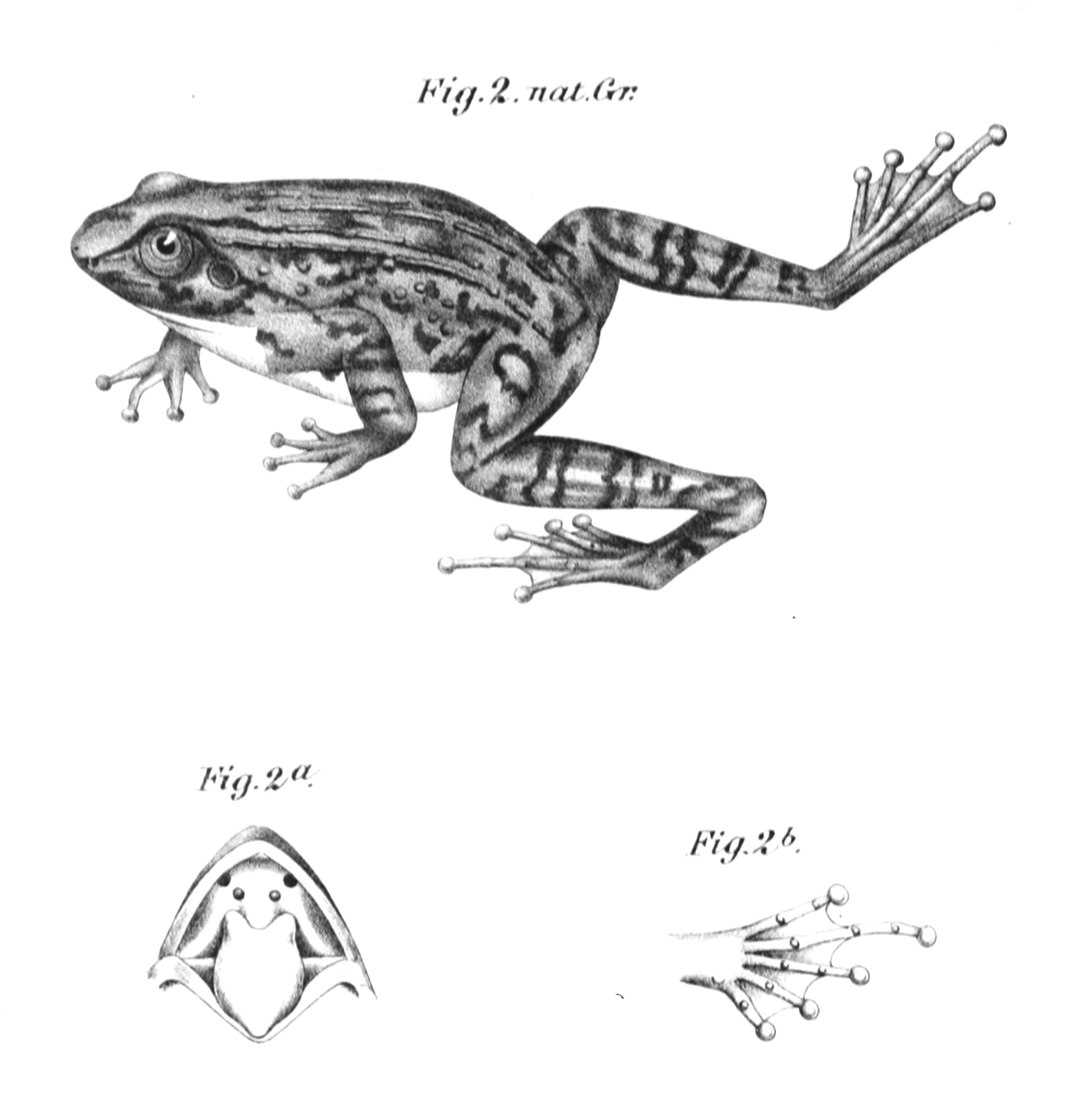
- Petropedetes cameronensis

Scientific classification
- Kingdom: Animalia
- Phylum: Chordata
- Class: Amphibia
- Order: Anura
- Family: Petropedetidae
- Genus: Petropedetes; Reichenow, 1874

Species
- See text

= Petropedetes =

Genus of amphibians

Petropedetes is a genus of frogs in the family Petropedetidae, found in sub-saharan tropical Africa. In 2002, the genus absorbed all three species of the genus Arthroleptides, but they were moved back in 2014. The informally assigned common name for frogs in this genus (and for frogs in certain other genera) is torrent frogs.

The following species are recognised in the genus Petropedetes:

- Petropedetes cameronensis (Reichenow, 1874)
- Petropedetes euskircheni (Barej et al., 2010)
- Petropedetes johnstoni (Boulenger, 1888)
- Petropedetes juliawurstnerae (Barej et al., 2010)
- Petropedetes newtonii (Bocage, 1895) – Barej et al. (2010) considers P. darwinii occurring in Bioko Island (Equatorial Guinea) a synonym of P. johnstoni.
- Petropedetes palmipes Boulenger, 1905
- Petropedetes parkeri (Amiet, 1983)
- Petropedetes perreti (Amiet, 1973)
- Petropedetes vulpiae (Barej et al., 2010)

== Description ==
The genus Petropedetes is characterized by the following features: elongated and cordiform-shaped tongue, free and notched at the back; vomerine teeth behind the choanae, closer to each other than the choanae; unwebbed fingers; and a distinct tympanum. Additionally, P. nanator lack absence of tympanic papilla in breeding males.

Perett (1966) has denoted the osteological characteristics as robust and straight clavicles; a hardly bifurcated omosternum; and T-shaped terminal phalanges. These changes vary per species and do not apply to all.

== Geographical variations ==
The West African specie Petropedetes natator are identical with other genus members on the basis of toes and fingertips, and the presence of femoral glands in males. However, they differ by the presence of morphological features such as external voice sacs, mandibular fangs, a ridge on the tongue and conformation of the rheophilous tadpole, from the Central African species.

The three East African species P. martiensenni, P. yakunsini, and P. dutoiti match the Central African species by the shape of finger limbs, presence of tympanic papilla and femoral glands. P yakusini males also share anatomical features such as enlarged arms and spines on throat, with the Central African species.

Nevertheless, all East African species are distinct from Central African on the basis of lacking vomerine teeth.

== Habitat and Behavior ==
P. parkeri are found in wet, mossy rocks in the forest. They inhabit large rocks crossed by small streams and gather on humid rocky surfaces near torrent water during breeding season. Outside of breeding season these species are found on leaves.

P. euskircheni reside at higher altitudes such as Mt. Kupe and Mt. Nlonako in Cameroon. They have been observed near fast-flowing rivers and on tree and palm trunks.

P. perreti inhabit lowland areas of Southern Cameroon, Equatorial Guinea, and Gabon, especially the southern slopes of the Bamiléké Plateau. They lay their clutches on rock surfaces within the splash zones, along mountain streams above 1200 meters.

P. cameronensis occur mainly in lowland, but also from highlands found with P. perreti. This species is known from coastal Cameroonian lowland, south of Limbe. Some occurrences are also noted in Eastern Nigeria. Males are observed guarding clutches of eggs at night.

P. juliawurstnerae is known from Mt. Kupe and Meked, adjacent to Bakossi mountains. They settle in riverine vegetation or algae-covered stones 10-20 cm above ground level, occurring in syntopy with P. euskircheni.

P. palmipes populate Southern Cameroon, Equatorial Guinea, and Gabon. As per Barej et al. (2010), there is little data on the biology of this species. These have been observed in primary forests, Clutches are glued to submerged rocks, while tadpoles are located in stagnant parts of rivers beneath small rapids.

P vulpiae is associated with rocky forest streams and caves Eastern Nigeria and Republic of Congo.

P newtonii is found near sea level to 1km above, on Bokio and coastal Cameroon. Juveniles may be found away from water. Collectively, specimens can be found near streams or low vegetations, but occasionally a few feet above waters.

P johnstonii inhabits lowland and mangrove forests. The species does not rely on water for reproduction. Males are seen guarding the nests and clutches which are sited slightly above ground level.
