= Common squeaker =

Conservation status
- Least Concern (IUCN 3.1)

Scientific classification
- Kingdom: Animalia
- Phylum: Chordata
- Class: Amphibia
- Order: Anura
- Family: Arthroleptidae
- Genus: Arthroleptis
- Species: A. stenodactylus

Binomial name
- Arthroleptis stenodactylus Pfeffer, 1893

Synonyms
- Arthroleptis whytii Boulenger, 1897; Arthroleptis lönnbergi Nieden, 1915; Arthroleptis lonnbergi Nieden, 1915; Arthroleptis methneri Ahl, 1924; Arthroleptis stenodactylus uluguruensis Loveridge, 1932; Arthroleptis vagus Ahl, 1939 "1938"; Arthroleptis ukamiensis Ahl, 1939 "1938"; Coracodichus stenodactylus (Pfeffer, 1893)

Species of frog

Arthroleptis stenodactylus, the common squeaker, dune squeaker, narrow-footed humus frog, savanna squeaking frog, or shovel-footed squeaker, is a species of frog in the family Arthroleptidae. It occurs widely in the Sub-Saharan Africa and is known from coastal Kenya and eastern and southern Tanzania (including Zanzibar), south to Malawi and Mozambique and southwest to Zambia and southern Democratic Republic of the Congo to western Angola, northern Botswana, Zimbabwe, and northeastern South Africa. An isolated population in Uganda likely represent another species, and it is possible that the current species circumscription includes further cryptic species.

Arthroleptis stenodactylus inhabits a very wide variety of habitats such as forest, savanna woodland, thickets, and suburban areas at elevations up to 1,500 m (4,900 ft) above sea level, possibly higher. It is typically found in leaf litter. Breeding is through direct development and not dependent on water. The eggs are laid in hollows or burrows in damp earth. It is an abundant species that is not facing significant threats.
