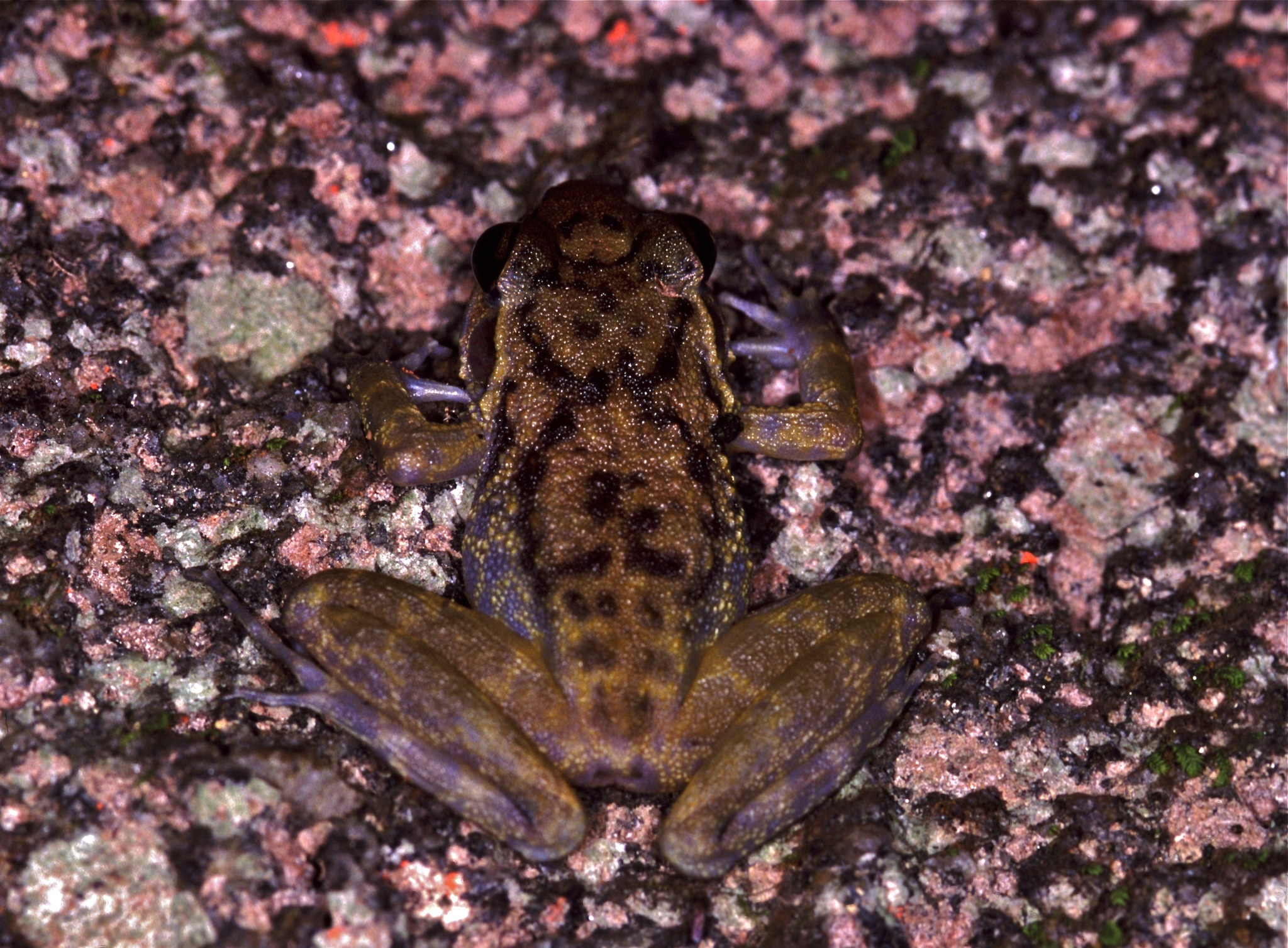

Conservation status
- Data Deficient (IUCN 3.1)

Scientific classification
- Kingdom: Animalia
- Phylum: Chordata
- Class: Amphibia
- Order: Anura
- Family: Petropedetidae
- Genus: Petropedetes
- Species: P. parkeri

Binomial name
- Petropedetes parkeri Amiet, 1983

= Petropedetes parkeri =

Species of frog

Petropedetes parkeri is a species of frog in the family Petropedetidae. It is found in western Cameroon and eastern Nigeria. Records from Equatorial Guinea and Gabon are uncertain, possibly belonging to Petropedetes euskircheni. P. parkeri is named after Hampton Wildman Parker, a British zoologist and herpetologist from the Natural History Museum, London. Common names Parker's water frog and Parker's torrent frog have been proposed for it.

== Description ==
Adult males measure 38–74 mm (1.5–2.9 in) and adult females 45–61 mm (1.8–2.4 in) in snout–urostyle length (SUL); females are on average smaller than males (respectively 61 and 74 mm (2.4 and 2.9 in) SUL). The body is robust. The tympanum is distinct, usually larger than the eye in males but always smaller than the eye in females. The snout is short and rounded. The fingers are slender. The toes have rudimentary webbing. The dorsum and the sides are olive or brownish, marbled with diffuse brown-olive spots. The throat is dirty whitish while the belly is whitish, slightly translucent. The femora and lower legs have large darker spots divided by thin, bright coloured transversal bars. The iris is golden with white-green shades.

== Habitat and conservation ==
Information on the ecology of Petropedetes parkeri suffers from uncertain species identifications. All confirmed records are from below 1,000 m (3,300 ft) above sea level. It appears to be a forest dweller, although during the breeding season, adults aggregate on humid rocky surfaces near torrents. The eggs are deposited on stones within the splash zone.

It is probably suffering from some habitat loss. It occurs in the Korup National Park in Cameroon.
