= Mont Nlonako Wildlife Reserve =

Protected area in the Region Littoral, Cameroon

- Interactive map of Mont Nlonako Wildlife Reserve
- Nearest city: Nkongsamba
- Coordinates: 4°49′56″N 10°3′42″E
- Area: 641 km^{2} (247 sq mi)

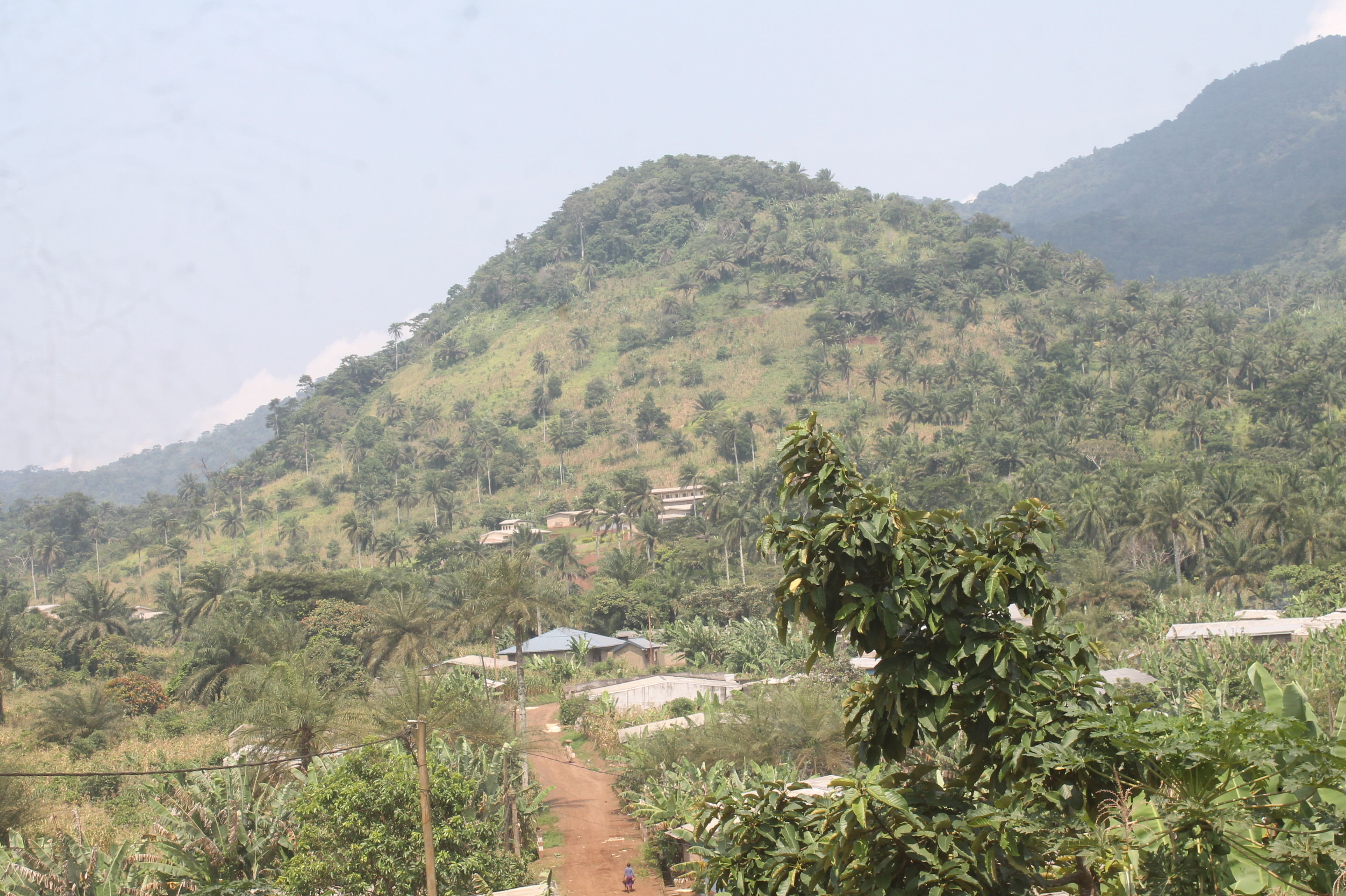
path on Mont Nlonako

The Mont Nlonako Wildlife Reserve is a wildlife reserve and a proposed protected area (WDPA ID: 308631) in the Littoral Region of Cameroon. This nature reserve covers an area of approximately 641.24 square kilometres (247.58 sq mi), on the south-east side of the city of Nkongsamba, starting from Mont Nlonako.

The reserve features lowland forest stretching east to the Nkam river (which forms the eastern boundary of the reserve) and south to the Nkébé river (a tributary of the Nkam). 267 bird species have been identified in the reserve.

Mount Nlonako harbours 93 types of amphibian species, including the goliath frog. Due to lack of employment and livelihood opportunities, locals in and around the Mount Nlonako area often engage in hunting and poaching of wildlife.
