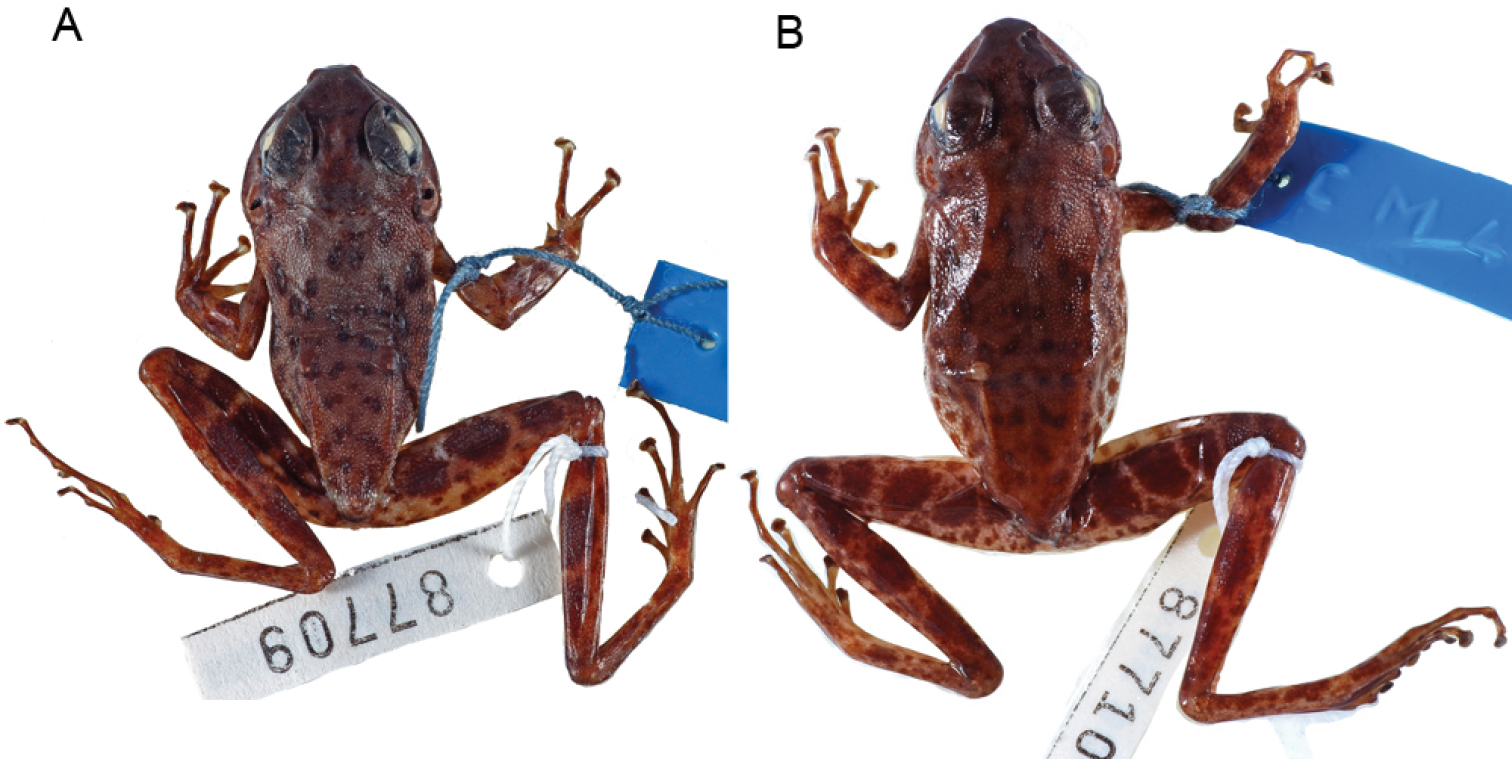

Conservation status
- Least Concern (IUCN 3.1)

Scientific classification
- Kingdom: Animalia
- Phylum: Chordata
- Class: Amphibia
- Order: Anura
- Family: Petropedetidae
- Genus: Petropedetes
- Species: P. johnstoni

Binomial name
- Petropedetes johnstoni (Boulenger, 1888)

Synonyms
- Cornufer johnstoni Boulenger, 1888 "1887"

= Petropedetes johnstoni =

Species of frog

Petropedetes johnstoni is a species of frog in the family Petropedetidae. It is endemic to coastal Cameroon and known with certainty only from few localities. For a period, Petropedetes newtonii was considered a junior synonym of this species, leading to a much broader distribution. The two species are now considered distinct, but information on Petropedetes johnstoni sensu stricto is limited. Common name Johnston's water frog has been coined for this species.

== Etymology ==
The specific name johnstoni honours Harry Johnston, a British explorer and naturalist who collected the holotype.

== Description ==
Adult males measure about 32 mm (1.3 in) and adult females about 38 mm (1.5 in) in snout–vent length. The snout is slightly rounded. The tympanum is distinct, smaller than the eye in the male; the supratympanic fold is distinct. The finger and the toe tips are expanded into discs; the fingers have no webbing whereas the toes may have rudimentary webbing. Dorsal skin bears only relatively small warts. The male lacks the hypertrophied forearm and the keratinised spicules on the skin of the throat and on the basis of the arms seen in Petropedetes newtonii.

== Habitat and conservation ==
Petropedetes johnstoni, as the species was circumscribed in 2004, occurs in lowland forest and mangrove forests. Males can call in forest far from water, and it appears that this species does not depend on water for its reproduction; the larvae are presumably terrestrial. Males guard a nest of eggs on large leaves slightly above the ground. At the time, loss of its forest habitat due to agricultural development, logging and expanding human settlements was considered as the major threat. It was present in the Korup National Park.
