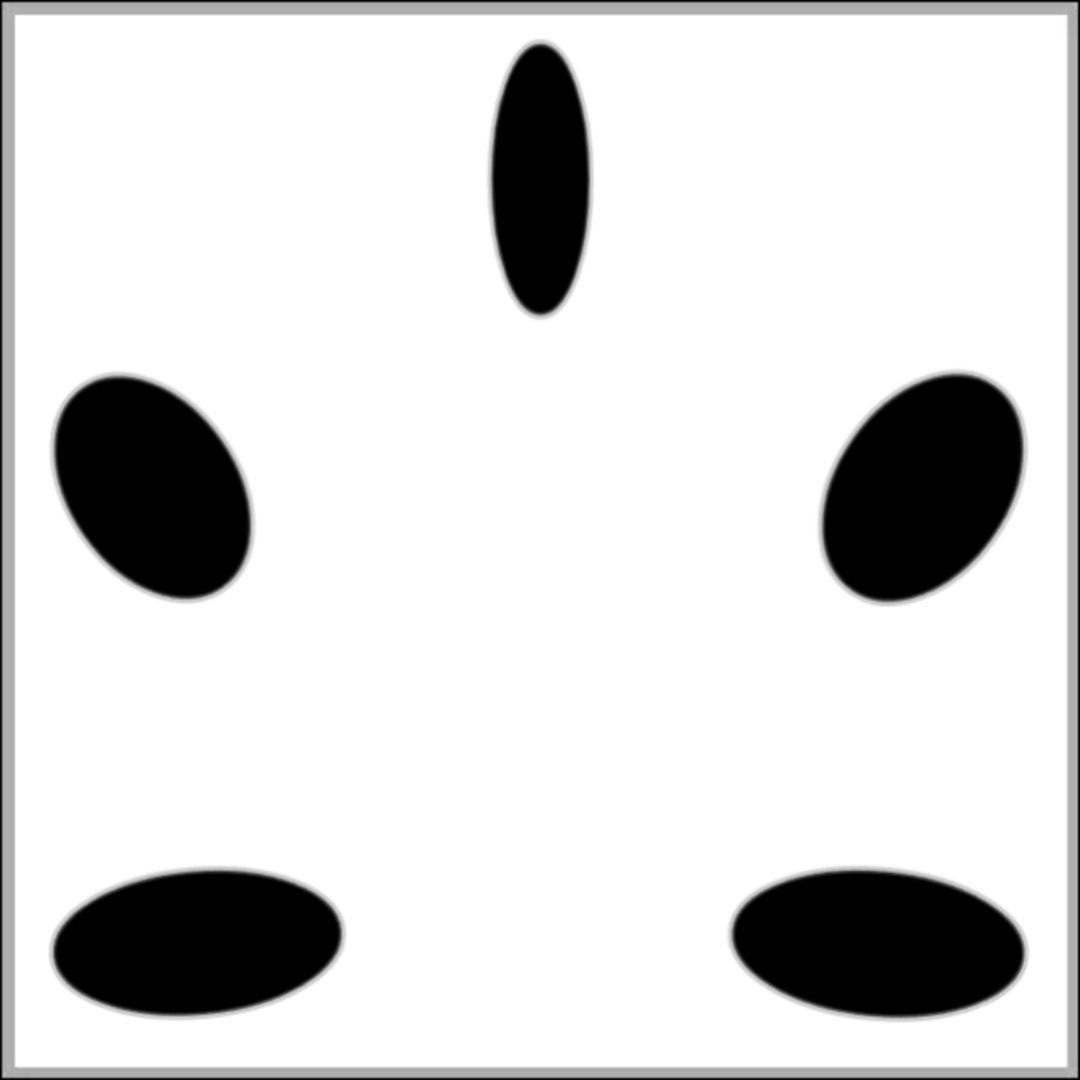
- Example of what the dorsal pattern of P. juliawurstnerae may look like.

Conservation status
- Endangered (IUCN 3.1)

Scientific classification
- Kingdom: Animalia
- Phylum: Chordata
- Class: Amphibia
- Order: Anura
- Family: Petropedetidae
- Genus: Petropedetes
- Species: P. juliawurstnerae

Binomial name
- Petropedetes juliawurstnerae Barej et al., 2010

= Petropedetes juliawurstnerae =

Species of frog

Petropedetes juliawurstnerae is a species of African torrent frog from Cameroon.

== Description ==
It is a brown frog with lighter greenish markings. The flanks have white warts. The legs have dark bands. The dorsum sometimes has a unique pattern as shown in the image.

== Distribution and ecology ==
This species has only been observed on Mt. Kupe and Meked on the nearby Bakossi Mountains. They can be found in torrents with rocky beds, on rocks with algae, and on surrounding vegetation at a height of 10–20 cm (4–8 in).

== Etymology ==
The name "P. juliawurstnerae" is a matronym of Mrs. Julia Anna Maria Wurstner, who supported the senior author of this species.
