= Petropedetes euskircheni =

Conservation status
- Endangered (IUCN 3.1)

Scientific classification
- Kingdom: Animalia
- Phylum: Chordata
- Class: Amphibia
- Order: Anura
- Family: Petropedetidae
- Genus: Petropedetes
- Species: P. euskircheni

Binomial name
- Petropedetes euskircheni Barej et al., 2010

Species of frog

Map of Cameroon where Petropedetes euskircheni are found.

Petropedetes euskircheni is a species of African torrent frog found in Cameroon.

== Description ==
It is a marbled brown frog. They have a thin white band between the eyes. The underside is white.

== Distribution and ecology ==
Petropedetes euskircheni is only found in two confirmed places: Mt. Kupe and Mt. Nlonako. The two localities have some but little genetic variation but can not be distinguished by their colors or morphometrics. The elevations they have been found in are 910–1,652 m (2,986–5,420 ft). They can be found in rapid-flowing streams and on steep rocks. They can also be found sitting on the nearby vegetation in a height of 20–180 cm (8–71 in).

== Etymology ==
The name "euskircheni" is a patronym of Oliver Euskirchen.
