= Petropedetes vulpiae =

Conservation status
- Least Concern (IUCN 3.1)

Scientific classification
- Kingdom: Animalia
- Phylum: Chordata
- Class: Amphibia
- Order: Anura
- Family: Petropedetidae
- Genus: Petropedetes
- Species: P. vulpiae

Binomial name
- Petropedetes vulpiae Barej et al., 2010

Species of frog

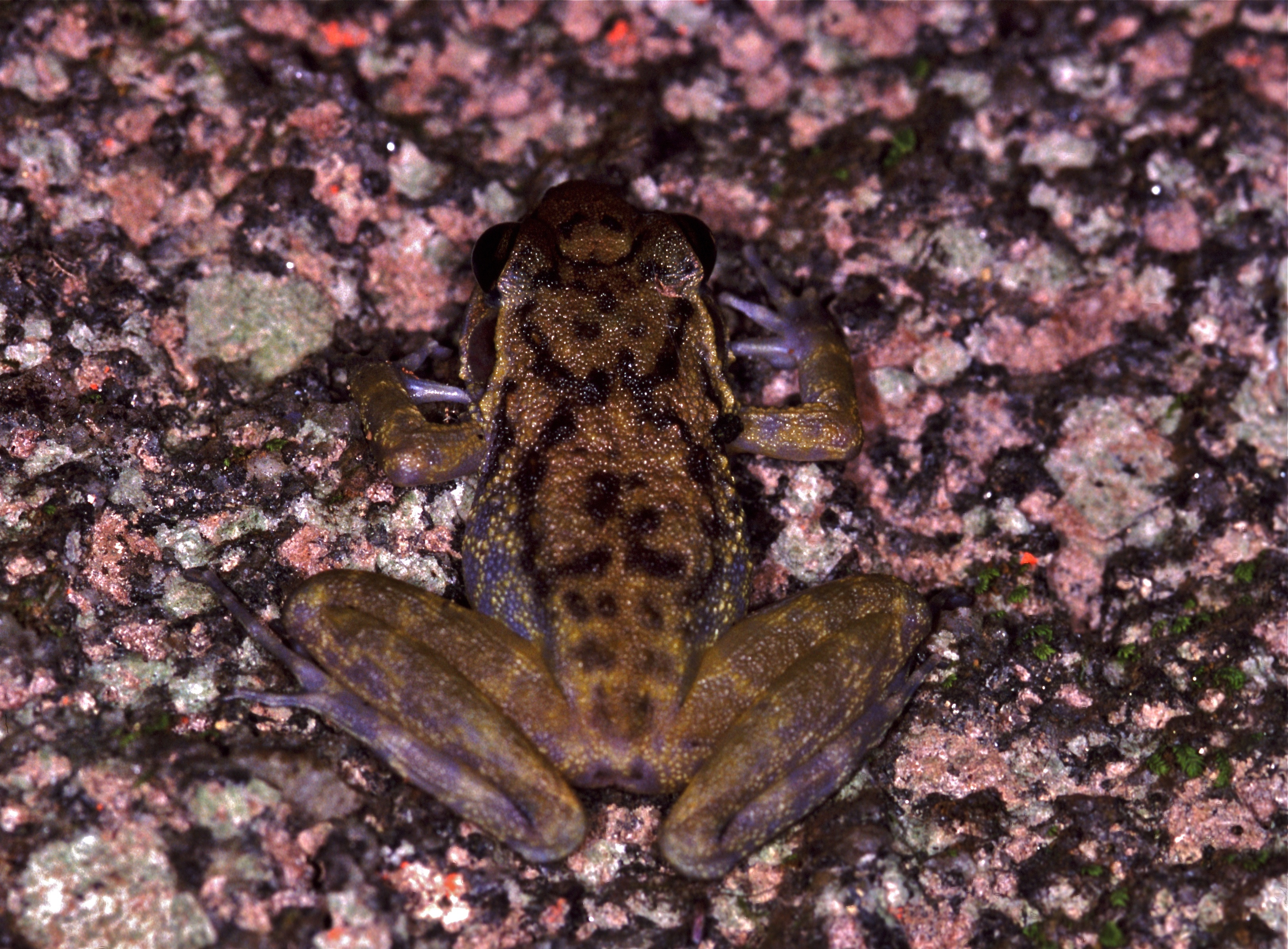

Petropedetes vulpiae is a species of African torrent frog found in eastern Nigeria to southern Gabon.

== Distribution and ecology ==
The species can be found in forests near streams in eastern Nigeria to southern Gabon at elevations of 315–1,000 m (1,033–3,281 ft). It can be found above 1,000 m (3,300 ft), (one specimen has been found at 1,769 m (5,804 ft), but this may not be a member of P. vulpiae) but they mostly stay at lower elevations. It is mainly nocturnal but can be found active on very humid days. Individuals may be found hiding between rocks, where the males have described to call "douc-douc". Males may guard their eggs at night. Their eggs come in clutches of around ten and are stuck onto moist rocks.

== Etymology ==
The name "vulpiae" is a tribute to Dr. Christine Fuchs, a German researcher from Johannes Gutenberg-Universität Mainz. "Fuchs" means "Fox" in German, and fox in Latin is "vulpes" or "vulpiae" (genitive).
