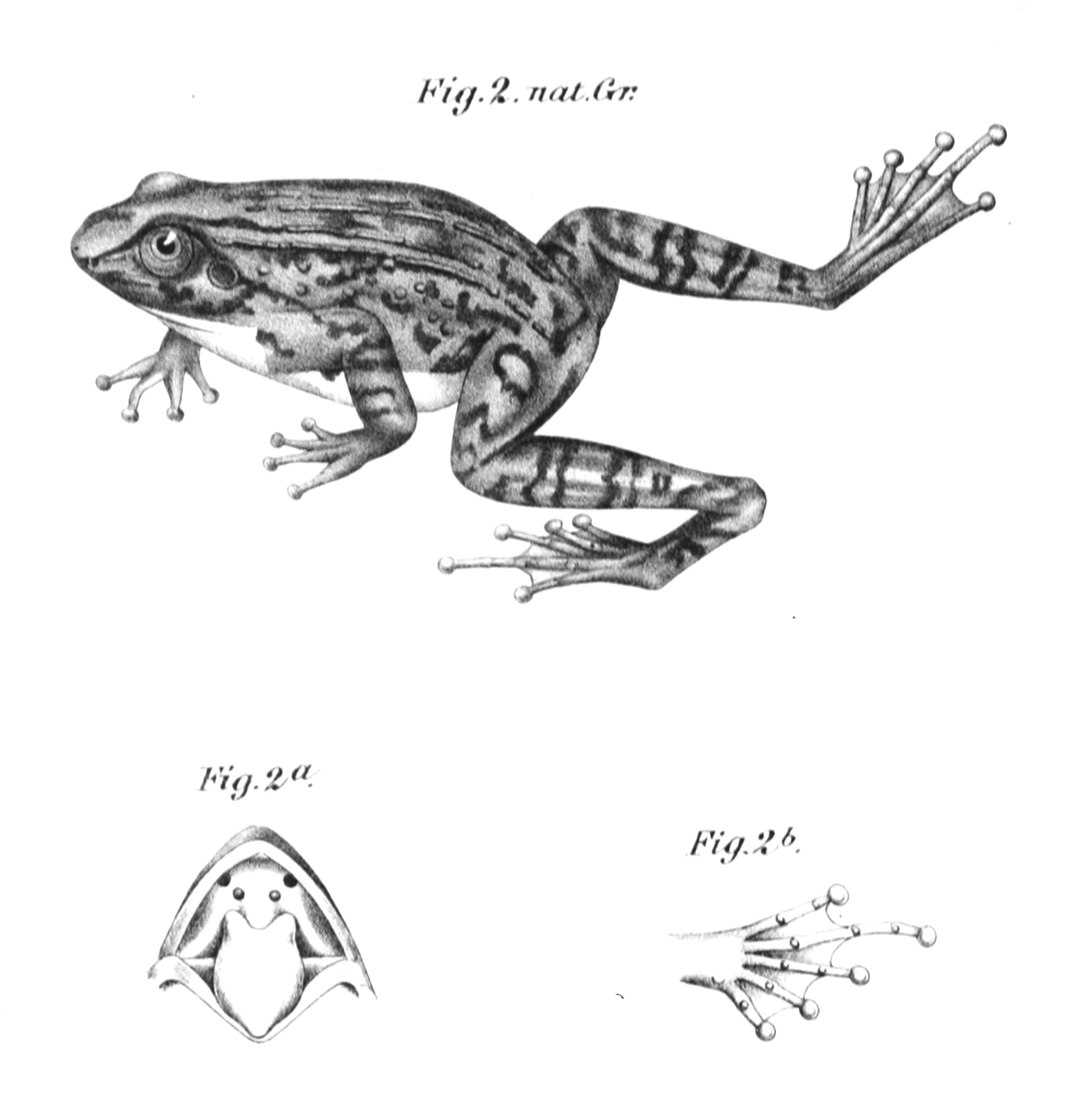
- Illustration that accompanied the original species description of Petropedetes cameronensis.

Conservation status
- Least Concern (IUCN 3.1)

Scientific classification
- Kingdom: Animalia
- Phylum: Chordata
- Class: Amphibia
- Order: Anura
- Family: Petropedetidae
- Genus: Petropedetes
- Species: P. cameronensis

Binomial name
- Petropedetes cameronensis Reichenow, 1874

Synonyms
- Petropedetes obscurus Ahl, 1924; Platymantis cameronensis (Reichenow, 1874); Hylambates cameronensis (Reichenow, 1874)

= Petropedetes cameronensis =

Species of frog

Petropedetes cameronensis, sometimes known as the Cameroon water frog, is a species of frog in the family Petropedetidae. It is found in southeastern Nigeria, southwestern Cameroon, and on the island of Bioko (Equatorial Guinea). It is the type species of the genus Petropedetes.

== Description ==
Petropedetes cameronensis is a small-sized Petropedetes with compact body. Males measure 27–35 mm (1.1–1.4 in) and females 34–49 mm (1.3–1.9 in) in snout–vent length. The snout is short. The tympanum is very small and rather indistinct, and without tympanic papilla (present in breeding males of many other Petropedetes species). The iris is golden. The canthus rostralis is sharp. The dorsum is light or dark brown with pale spots. Dorsal skin structure is variable with larger warts on the flanks and few large, longitudinal warts on back. The toes are approximately half-webbed.

The male advertisement call is a whistle or a trill that drowns the noise of flowing water.

The tadpole has a muscular tail that enables it to jump on stones; the tail is long and has no ventral fin and only a very narrow dorsal fin.

== Habitat and conservation ==
Petropedetes cameronensis lives near and in flowing water, for example on stones in a fast-flowing stream and in rapids and waterfalls. It generally occurs at low altitudes but sometimes as high as 1,400 m (4,600 ft) above sea level. The eggs are laid on tree trunks or leaves close to humid rocks. The tadpoles are saxicolous (living on rocks).

Petropedetes cameronensis is a fairly common species, but it is threatened by habitat loss caused by agricultural development, logging, and growing human settlements. It is found in the Korup National Park (Cameroon).
