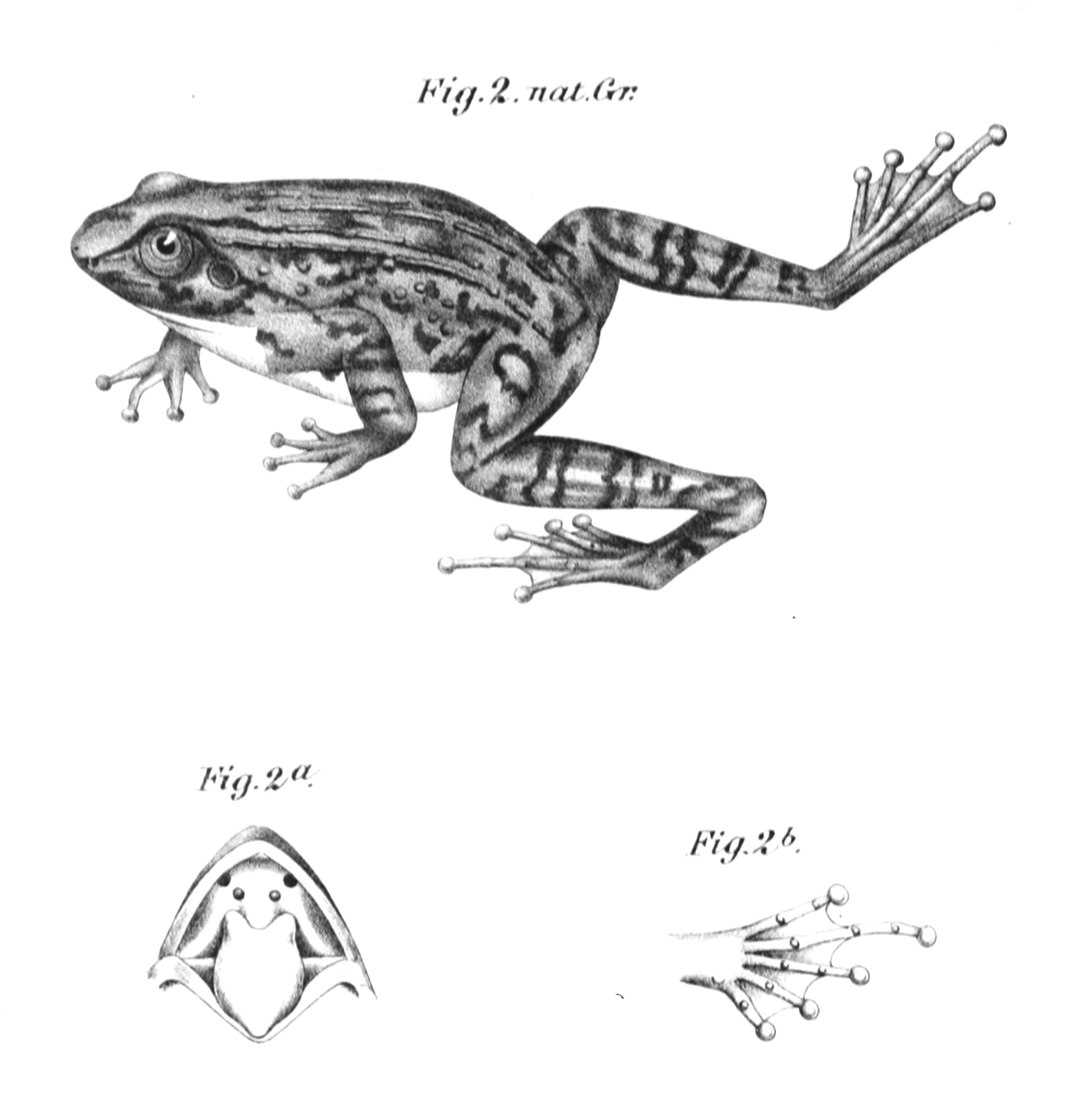
- Petropedetes cameronensis

Scientific classification
- Kingdom: Animalia
- Phylum: Chordata
- Class: Amphibia
- Order: Anura
- Superfamily: Ranoidea
- Family: Petropedetidae; Noble, 1931

Type genus
- Petropedetes Reichenow, 1874

Synonyms
- Petropedetinae

= Petropedetidae =

Family of amphibians

The Petropedetidae are a family of frogs containing two genera and 11 species. They are found in sub-Saharan tropical Africa and are sometimes known under common name African torrent frogs.

They are inhabitants of the splash-water zone of clear-running streams predominantly in forests. Tadpoles are either semiterrestrial in the spray zone or fully aquatic in zones of the strongest currents. Some species guard their clutches. They are medium- to large-sized frogs (Arthroleptides and Petropedetes).

== Taxonomy ==
The Petropedetidae are related to true frogs, family Ranidae, and have often been considered as a subfamily within a broadly defined Ranidae. However, they are now commonly treated as a family, although the genera included may differ between sources. In particular, Conraua is sometimes included in the Petropedetidae, instead of forming its own monogeneric family Conrauidae.

== Genera ==
The two genera in the family are:

- Arthroleptides Nieden, 1911 – African torrent frogs, three species
- Petropedetes Reichenow, 1874 – African water frogs, nine species

Recognition of Arthroleptides as a genus separate from Petropedetes is relatively recent.
