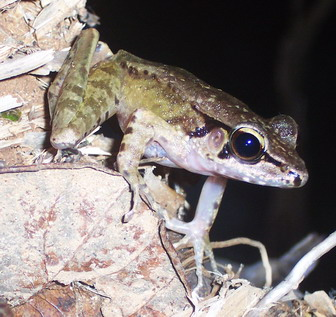
- Javan torrent frog (W. masonii)

Scientific classification
- Kingdom: Animalia
- Phylum: Chordata
- Class: Amphibia
- Order: Anura
- Family: Ranidae
- Genus: Wijayarana; Arifin, Chan, Smart, Hertwig, Smith, Iskandar, and Haas, 2021

Species
- See text

= Wijayarana =

Genus of frogs

Wijayarana is a group of true frogs found in Southeast Asia. Their common name is Wijaya cascade frogs. Many are commonly known as "torrent frogs" after their favorite habitat - small rapid-flowing mountain and hill streams -, but this name is used for many similar-looking frogs regardless of whether they are closely related.

== Taxonomy ==
All species in this genus were previously classified in the genus Huia, which was found by a 2021 study to be paraphyletic; the type species Huia cavitympanum (the hole-in-the-head frog) was found to be related to the genus Meristogenys, whereas the remaining members of Huia were sister to this clade. Due to this, the new genus Wijayarana was described to accommodate all members of Huia aside from H. cavitympanum. The genus name is derived from wijaya, the Indonesian spelling of the Sanskrit word vijaya, meaning "victory", and references the former Srivijaya empire, whose territory closely resembles the distribution of the genus.

Several species of Amolops and Odorrana are highly convergent with Wijayarana. O. absita for example is highly similar in habitus to the completely allopatric W. masonii.

In another incidence of convergent evolution yielding adaptation to habitat, the tadpoles of Amolops, Wijayarana, Huia, Meristogenys as well as Rana sauteri have a raised and usually well-developed sucker on their belly. This is useful in keeping in place in rocky torrents, where these frogs grow up. But as Odorrana and Staurois from comparable habitat prove, this sucker is by no means a necessity and other means of adaptation to torrent habitat exist.

=== Species ===
The following species are recognised in the genus Wijayarana:

- Wijayarana javana – Java huia frog
- Wijayarana masonii – Javan torrent frog
- Wijayarana melasma – Siamese cascade frog
- Wijayarana modiglianii
- Wijayarana sumatrana – Sumatran torrent frog
