= Torrent frog =

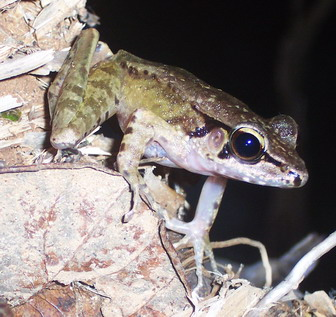
Javan torrent frog – Huia masonii, Ranidae, Indonesia

Torrent frogs are a number of unrelated frogs that prefer to inhabit small rapid-flowing mountain or hill streams with a lot of torrents. They are generally smallish neobatrachians with a greyish-brown and usually darkly mottled back, giving them excellent camouflage among wet rocks overgrown with algae; their well-developed feet make them agile climbers of slippery rocks.

Torrent frogs belong to the following taxa:

- The "torrent frogs" of Asia are certain species in various ranoid genera: Amolops, Huia, Odorrana (all Ranidae), Micrixalus, (Micrixalidae) and Nanorana (Dicroglossidae).
- The "torrent frogs" of Africa are the genera Arthroleptides, Petropedetes (both family Petropedetidae) and Odontobatrachus (Odontobatrachidae), which are found in eastern Africa, central Africa and western Africa, respectively.
- The "torrent frogs" of Australia are the genus Taudactylus of the Australian ground frog family (Myobatrachidae).
- The torrent treefrog (Litoria nannotis) of Australia is in the tree frog family (Hylidae)
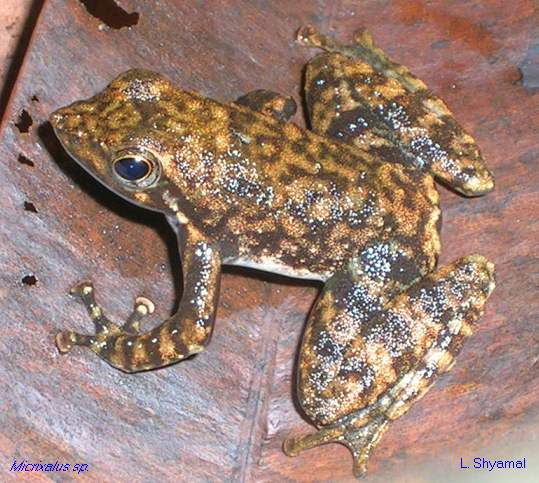
Black torrent frog
Micrixalus saxicola
Ranidae
India

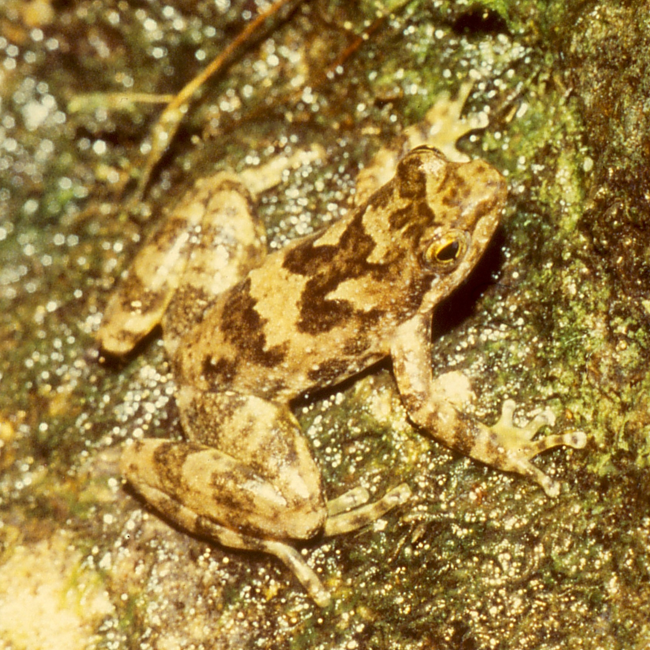
Eungella torrent frog
Taudactylus eungellensis
Myobatrachidae
Australia

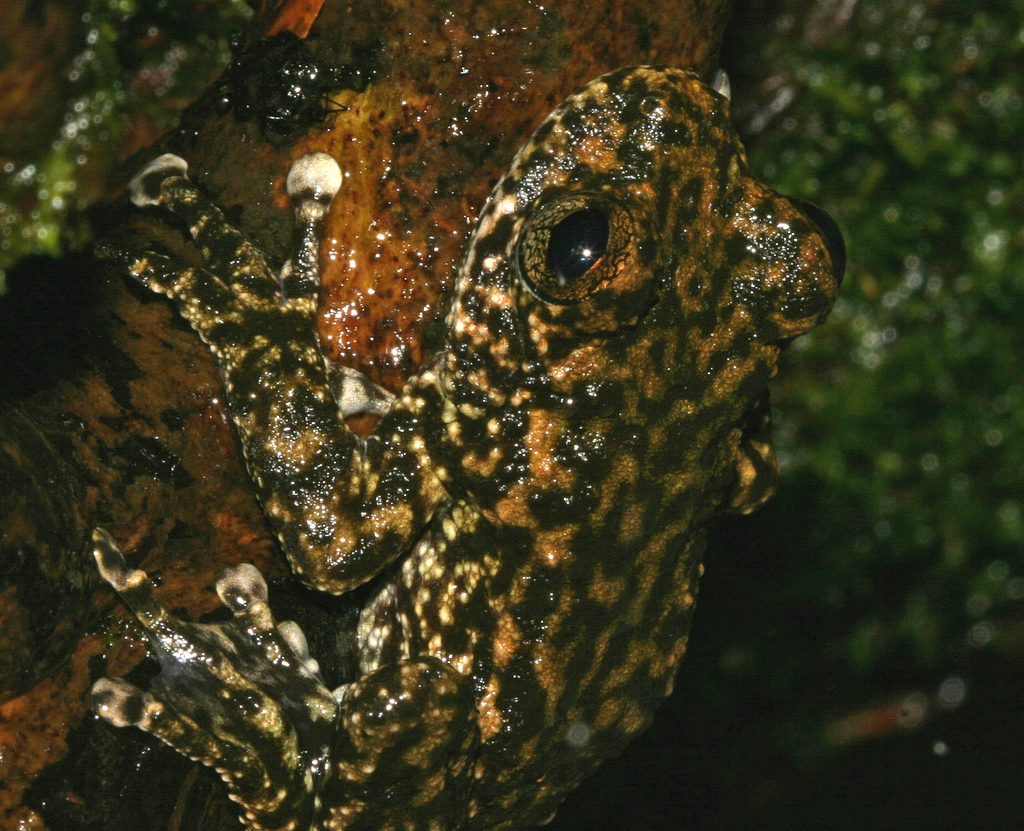
Torrent treefrog
Litoria nannotis
Hylidae
Australia

== See also ==
- Grass frog (disambiguation)
- Green frog (disambiguation)
- Rocket frog (disambiguation)
- Tree frog
- Torrent salamander
