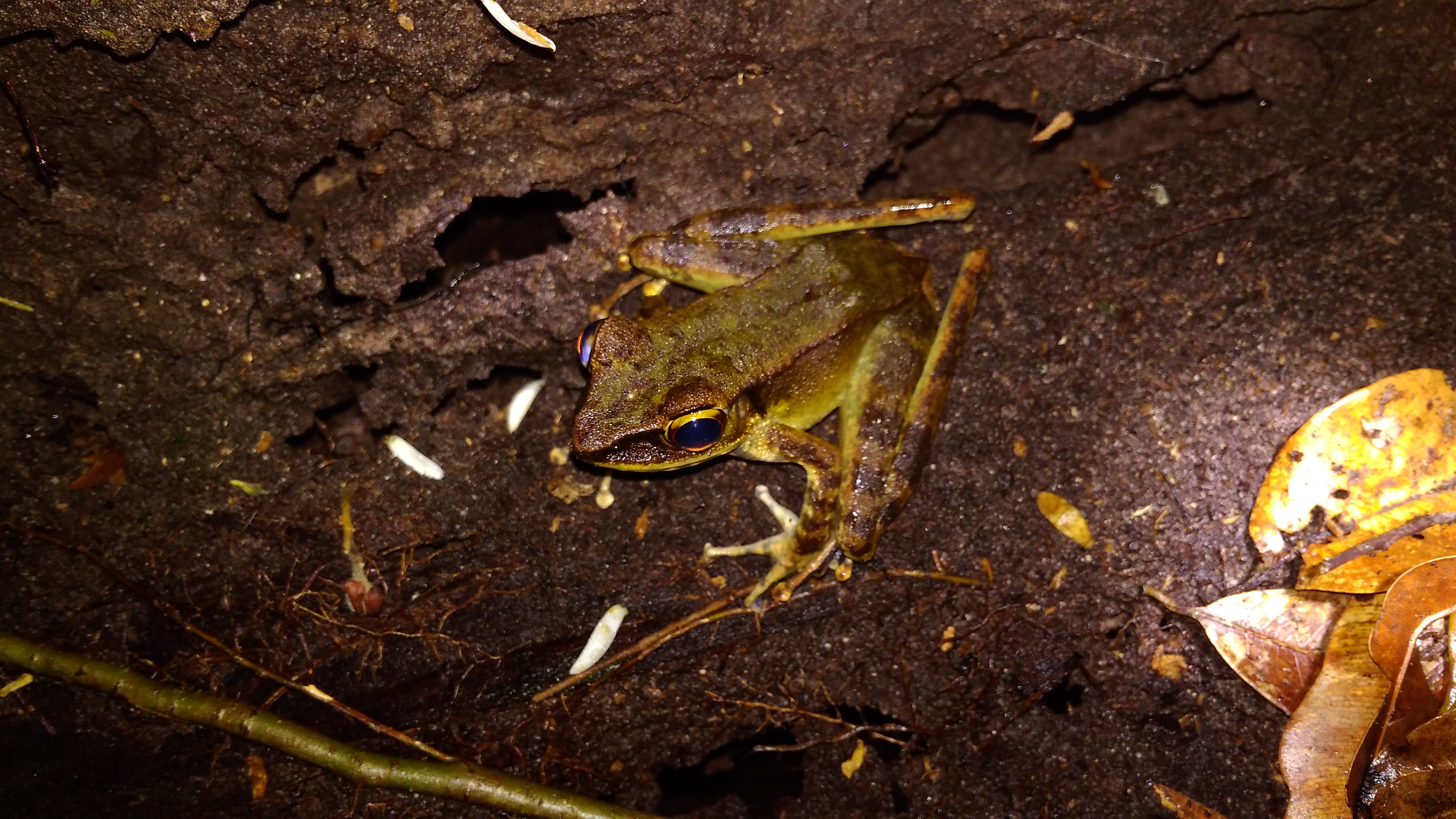

Conservation status
- Vulnerable (IUCN 3.1)

Scientific classification
- Kingdom: Animalia
- Phylum: Chordata
- Class: Amphibia
- Order: Anura
- Family: Ranidae
- Genus: Meristogenys
- Species: M. jerboa

Binomial name
- Meristogenys jerboa (Günther, 1872)

Synonyms
- Hylorana jerboa Günther, 1872; Rana jerboa (Günther, 1872); Hylarana jerboa (Günther, 1872); Amolops jerboa (Günther, 1872)

= Meristogenys jerboa =

Species of frog

Meristogenys jerboa is a species of frog in the family Ranidae. It is endemic to western Sarawak in Borneo (East Malaysia). Common names western torrent frog, Matang torrent frog, and Gunther's Borneo frog have been coined for it. Many cryptic species have been separated from this species. Based on mitochondrial DNA, current "true" Meristogenys jerboa still includes two major lineages. However, because the lineages occur in sympatry and do not differ in morphology, Shimada and colleagues elected to treat them as intraspecific variants.

== Description ==
Females can grow to 82 mm (3.2 in) in snout–vent length, males are considerable smaller. In a sample of 32 males and 6 females representing several populations, adult males measured 34–41 mm (1.3–1.6 in) and adult females 61–65 mm (2.4–2.6 in) in snout–vent length. The snout is protruding in vertical view. Males have larger tympanum compared to females. Males have a slender body, whereas females are slightly more stocky. The toes are webbed. A black marking surrounds the eye and the tympanum and extends to the flank. The iris is bronze in the upper third and coppery in the lower parts.

The tadpoles have a large suctorial disk. They are light brown, but can have orange to slightly olive hue. The snout and body are depressed and streamlined. The tail is strong with a pointed tip. The largest tadpoles (Gosner stages 38–41) reach 41 mm (1.6 in) in total length.

== Habitat and conservation ==
Meristogenys jerboa occurs in rocky streams in lowland and hillside forests. Breeding takes place along rocky streams where the tadpoles cling to the rocks, probably feeding on lithophytic algae.

The type locality is within the Matang Forest Reserve, where the species is abundant and not under threat. When the International Union for Conservation of Nature (IUCN) assessed conservation status of this species in 2004, it was not known from other localities, but Shimada and colleagues report it from several localities.
