= Meristogenys maryatiae =

Conservation status
- Least Concern (IUCN 3.1)

Scientific classification
- Kingdom: Animalia
- Phylum: Chordata
- Class: Amphibia
- Order: Anura
- Family: Ranidae
- Genus: Meristogenys
- Species: M. maryatiae

Binomial name
- Meristogenys maryatiae Matsui, Shimada, and Sudin, 2010

Species of frog

Meristogenys maryatiae, also known as Maryati's torrent frog, is a species of frog in the family Ranidae. It is endemic to the state of Sabah, in the Malaysian part of Borneo. The specific name honours Prof. Datin Mohamed Maryati, entomologist from the Universiti Malaysia Sabah, who helped the describers of this species during their herpetological surveys in Sabah.

== Description ==
Adult males measure 31–37 mm (1.2–1.5 in) and adult females, based on just two specimens, 65–66 mm (2.6–2.6 in) in snout–vent length. The body is moderately slender. The head is triangular and wider than it is long. The tympanum is distinct, but the supratympanic fold is weak. The fingers are slender and have tips of expanded into discs; no webbing is present. The hindlimbs are slender. The toe tips bear discs similar to the finger ones. The toes are fully webbed. The dorsum is shagreened. The dorsolateral folds are low and indistinct. Dorsal colouration is olive brown with dark spots. The iris is golden. The limbs have alternating light and dark brown cross bars. The lower surfaces are whitish, except for the paired subgular vocal sac in males, which is light brown.

Tadpoles of Gosner stage 40 measure about 43 mm (1.7 in) in total length, of which the tail makes little more than one half. They are greenish yellow on head-body and tail, with black spots on body and caudal muscle.

== Distribution ==
This species is known from the western slopes of the Crocker Range in Sabah.

== Habitat and conservation ==
Meristogenys maryatiae occurs in lowland to lower montane tropical primary and secondary rainforests at elevations of 155–1,000 m (509–3,281 ft) above sea level; it has also been recorded in a stream running through a rubber plantation. Adults have been seen among stones and grass on riverbeds and on rocks in streams; calling males were observed by a wide stream at night. Tadpoles have been seen clinging to bare rock in a shallow portion of a swift stream.

Meristogenys maryatiae is common throughout its known range. Although it is probably locally affected by habitat loss, much of the known range is within a well-protected national park, the Crocker Range National Park; it probably also occurs in the Kinabalu National Park. It is locally collected for food, but this is not considered a threat.
