= Wijayarana modiglianii =

Conservation status
- Least Concern (IUCN 3.1)

Scientific classification
- Kingdom: Animalia
- Phylum: Chordata
- Class: Amphibia
- Order: Anura
- Family: Ranidae
- Genus: Wijayarana
- Species: W. modiglianii

Binomial name
- Wijayarana modiglianii (Doria, Salvidio & Tavano, 1999)

Synonyms
- Amolops (Huia) modiglianii Doria, Salvidio & Tavano, 1999; Huia modiglianii — Frost, 2002

Species of frog

Wijayarana modiglianii is a species of frog in the family Ranidae. The species is endemic to Sumatra (Indonesia). It was originally only known from two locations near Lake Toba, but is now known to be more widespread. The specific name modiglianii honors Elio Modigliani, an Italian anthropologist and zoologist who collected the holotype in 1891. The common name Modigliani's huia frog has been coined for this species. Morphological evidence suggests that it can hybridize with Huia sumatrana, but this needs confirmation using genetic data.

== Description ==
The holotype of Wijayarana modiglianii, an adult male, measures 32 mm (1.3 in) in snout-to-vent length (SVL), whereas an adult female paratype measures 55 mm (2.2 in) in SVL. The head is broader than it is wide, and the snout is slightly pointed. The tympanum is large and distinct. The fingers are slender and bear large discs in their tips. The hind limbs are long. The toe discs are smaller than the finger discs, and the toes are almost fully webbed. The thighs and the tibia have six crossbars each.

== Habitat and conservation ==
Wijayarana modiglianii occurs in tropical lowland and montane forests in association with fast-moving streams at elevations of 400–1,370 m (1,310–4,490 ft) above sea level. It has also been recorded near a forest edge, adjacent to an agricultural area. The tadpoles develop in streams.

Although this species can be locally common, it is threatened by habitat loss caused by logging and creation of plantations, as well as siltation and pollution of streams caused by deforestation and agriculture. It is present in the Kerinci Seblat and Bukit Barisan Selatan National Parks as well as in the Batang Toru Protection Forest.
