= Lined flying dragon =

There are two species of lizard named lined flying dragon:

- Draco lineatus, found in Indonesia, the Philippines, and Malaysia
- Draco modiglianii, found in Indonesia
