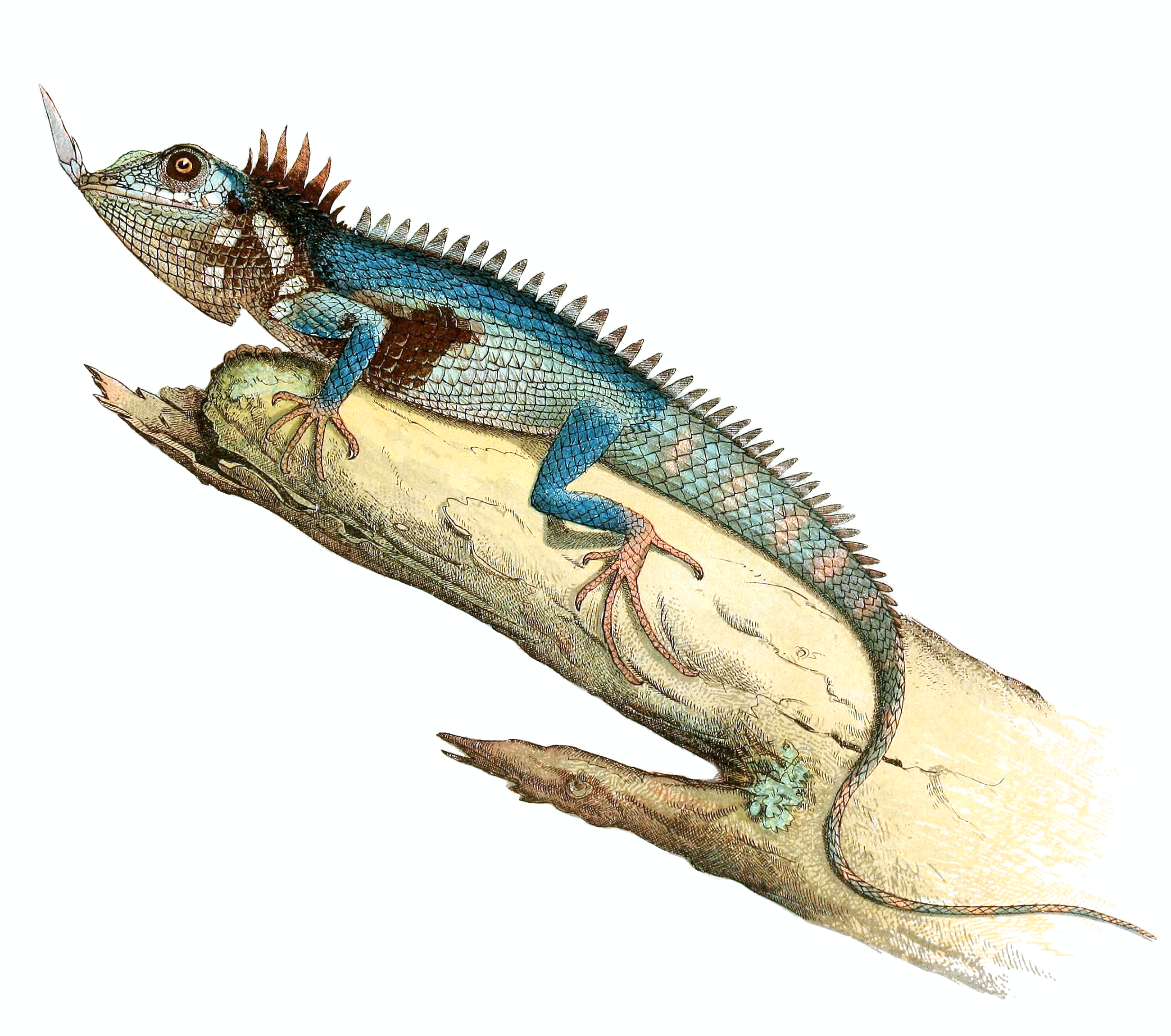
- 1933 illustration based on the male holotype specimen. Note the blue colouration, as it was unknown that the preservation process of the specimen had changed its colour from bright green to blue.

Conservation status
- Endangered (IUCN 3.1)

Scientific classification
- Kingdom: Animalia
- Phylum: Chordata
- Class: Reptilia
- Order: Squamata
- Suborder: Iguania
- Family: Agamidae
- Genus: Harpesaurus
- Species: H. modiglianii

Binomial name
- Harpesaurus modiglianii Vinciguerra, 1933
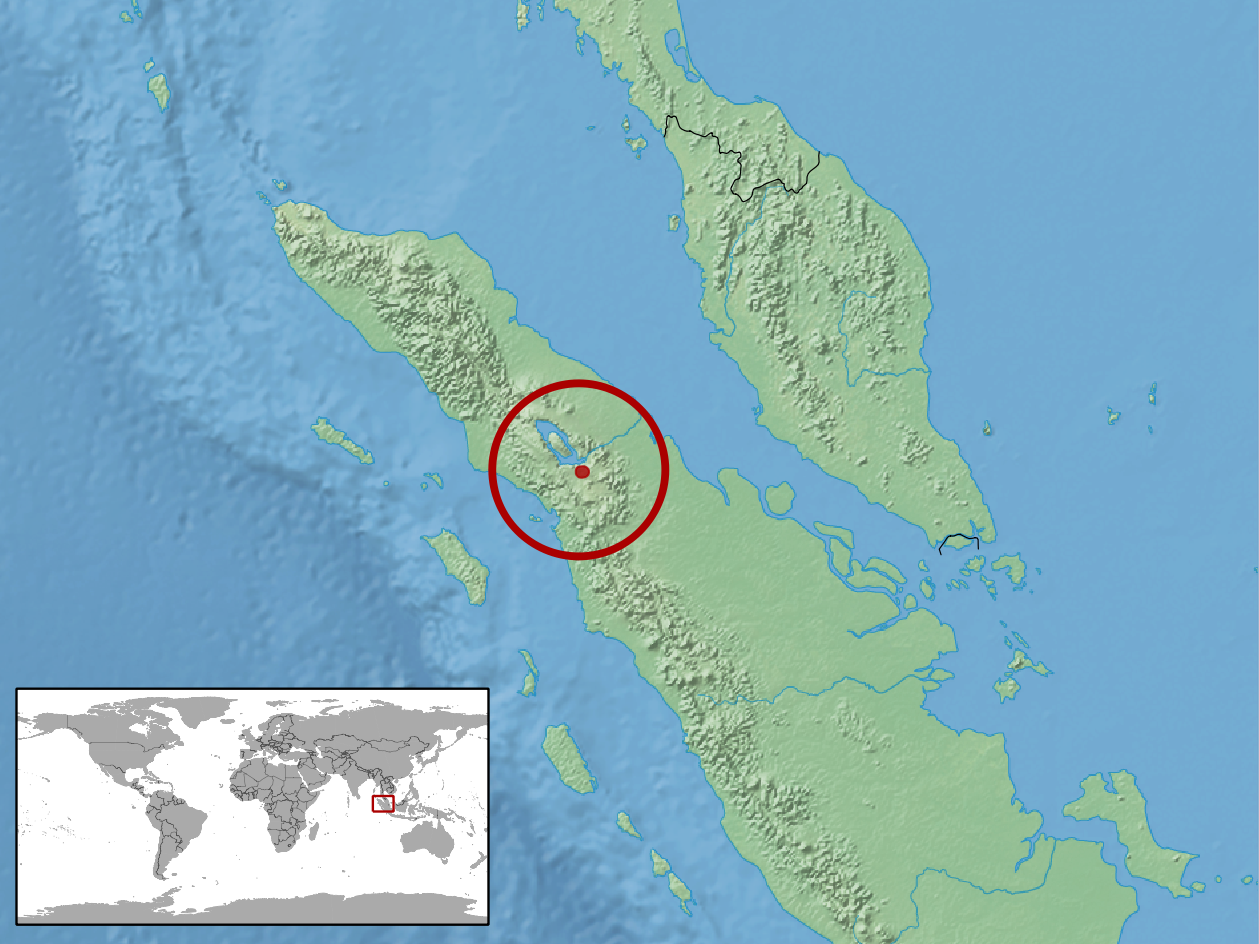

= Harpesaurus modiglianii =

Species of lizard

Harpesaurus modiglianii, also known commonly as Modigliani's nose-horned lizard, is a species of lizard in the subfamily Draconinae of the family Agamidae. The species is endemic to Indonesia.

Once only known from the holotype, a single specimen collected from North Sumatra in 1891, the species was rediscovered after a living population of the species was sighted in 2018.

== Etymology ==
The specific name, modiglianii, is honor of Italian zoologist Elio Modigliani.

== Geographic distribution ==
Harpesaurus modiglianii is indigenous to northern Sumatra, Indonesia.

== Habitat ==
The preferred natural habitat of Harpesaurus modiglianii is forest.

== Description ==
The holotype specimen of Harpesaurus modiglianii is a male, and the preservation process had caused it to turn blue. The discovery of live specimens in 2018 revealed that the species is naturally a luminous green colour in life.

H. modiglianii has a sickle-shaped upturned nasal appendage. Not including this appendage, the holotype has a snout-to-vent length (SVL) of 8.3 cm (3.3 in), and a tail length of 13.9 cm (5.5 in). Its nasal appendage is 6 mm (0.24 in) long, roughly as long as the head.

== Reproduction ==
Harpesaurus modiglianii is oviparous.
