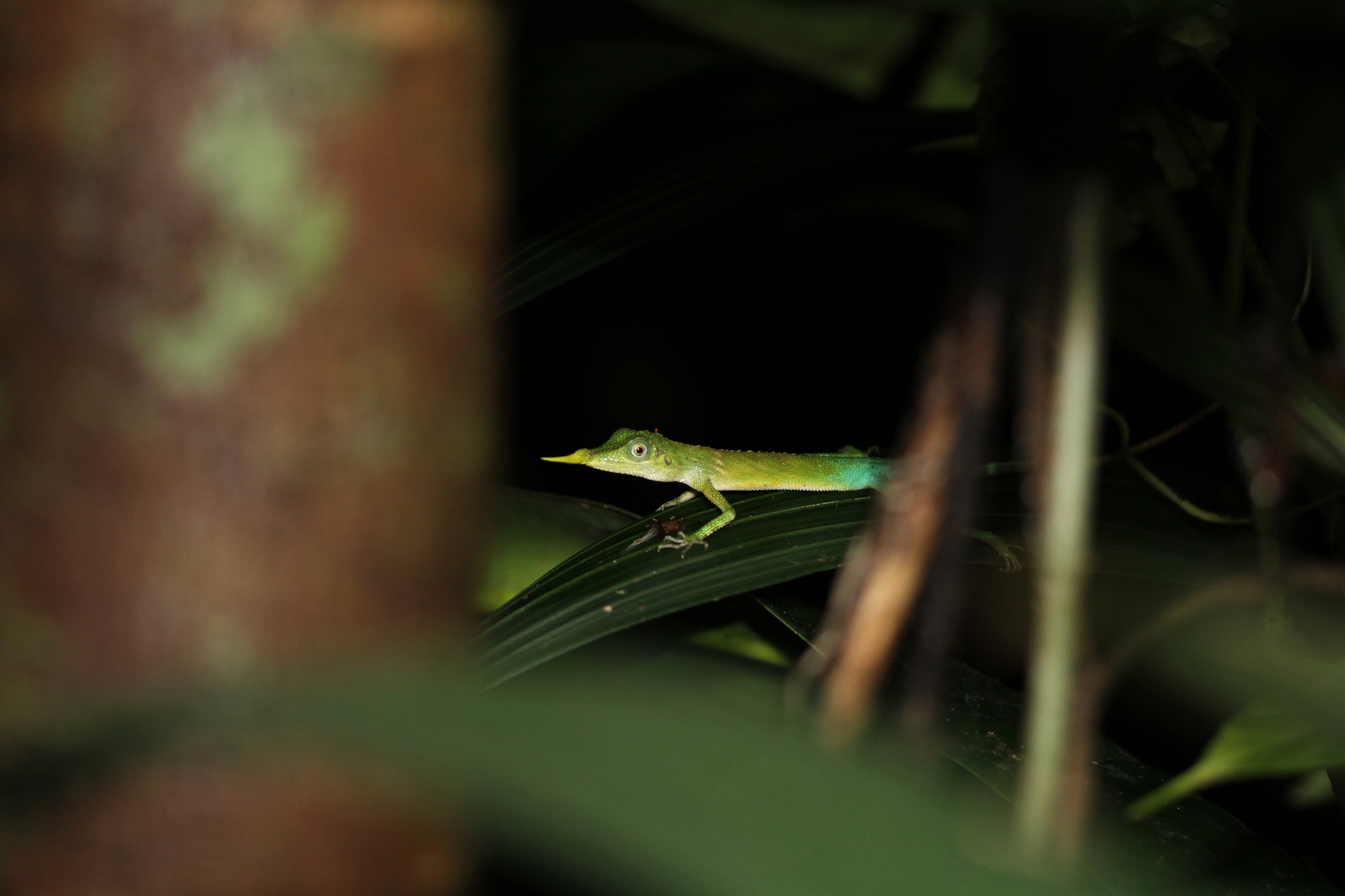

Scientific classification
- Kingdom: Animalia
- Phylum: Chordata
- Class: Reptilia
- Order: Squamata
- Suborder: Iguania
- Family: Agamidae
- Genus: Harpesaurus
- Species: H. brooksi

Binomial name
- Harpesaurus brooksi Parker, 1924

Synonyms
- Thaumatorhynchus brooksi Parker, 1924; Harpesaurus brooksi — Wermuth, 1967

= Harpesaurus brooksi =

Species of lizard

Harpesaurus brooksi is a species of lizard in the family Agamidae. The species is endemic to Sumatra.

== Etymology ==
The specific name, brooksi, is in honor of British metallurgical chemist Cecil Joslin Brooks, who collected natural history specimens in Borneo and Sumatra.

== Description ==
H. brooksi has a single cylindrical "horn" on its nose.

== Reproduction ==
H. brooksi is oviparous.
