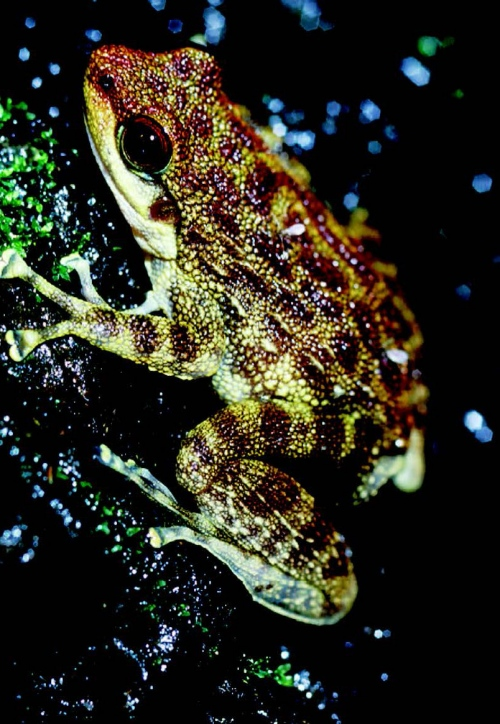
- Odontobatrachus arndti, Ivory Coast

Scientific classification
- Kingdom: Animalia
- Phylum: Chordata
- Class: Amphibia
- Order: Anura
- Suborder: Neobatrachia
- Clade: Ranoidea
- Family: Odontobatrachidae; Barej et al., 2014
- Genus: Odontobatrachus; Barej et al., 2014

= Odontobatrachus =

Genus of amphibians

Odontobatrachus is a genus of frogs comprising the family Odontobatrachidae. In a 2014 research project Barej, Rödel, Loader & Schmitz separated the genus from the established genus Petropedetes and separated the new family from the established family Petropedetidae.

== Taxonomy and affinities ==
The species had originally been assigned to the genus Petropedetes in the Petropedetidae, a family of so-called torrent frogs of Africa, so the type species is Petropedetes natator Boulenger, 1905. However, recent morphological and genomic investigation showed the species not only to be cladistically alien to the Petropedetidae, but to all other existing anuran families as well. Furthermore, the family Odontobatrachidae turned out to be fairly ancient, estimated to have originated in the mid-Cretaceous period, some 80 Ma – 90 Ma ago. Consequently, a new family and genus were assigned, respectively Odontobatrachidae and Odontobatrachus. The details of the evolutionary history of the taxon however, still are open to alternative lines of interpretation.

== Description ==
Like many species of tadpoles inhabiting fast-flowing mountain streams, the larvae of Odontobatrachus are streamlined, with a flattened body shape, and with large sucker-like mouths adapted to attachment to rocks in defiance of powerful currents.

Differential diagnosis of adult Odontobatrachus is supported by a range of features that distinguish the species from other local species of Anura, and from the Petropedetidae in particular. In external appearance they are moderate-sized frogs with a body length of up to about 65 mm. The skin is granular in texture with glandular ridges. There is no lateral line organ, but nuptial pads are present in the male. The maxillae (upper jaws) are densely set with sharply pointed, somewhat recurved teeth, some of them also occurring on the vomer. In contrast each mandible bears just one large, sharply pointed recurved odontoid tusk. It has been confirmed that Odontobatrachus do at least on occasion swallow frogs, but it is not certain whether their dentition reflects their being either specialist or opportunistic predators of relatively large frogs.

The Petropedetidae differ from Odontobatrachus in several ways, including that they lack tusks on the mandibles and that they either lack vocal sacs, or, if they have one it is median; Odontobatrachus has lateral vocal sacs.

== Species ==
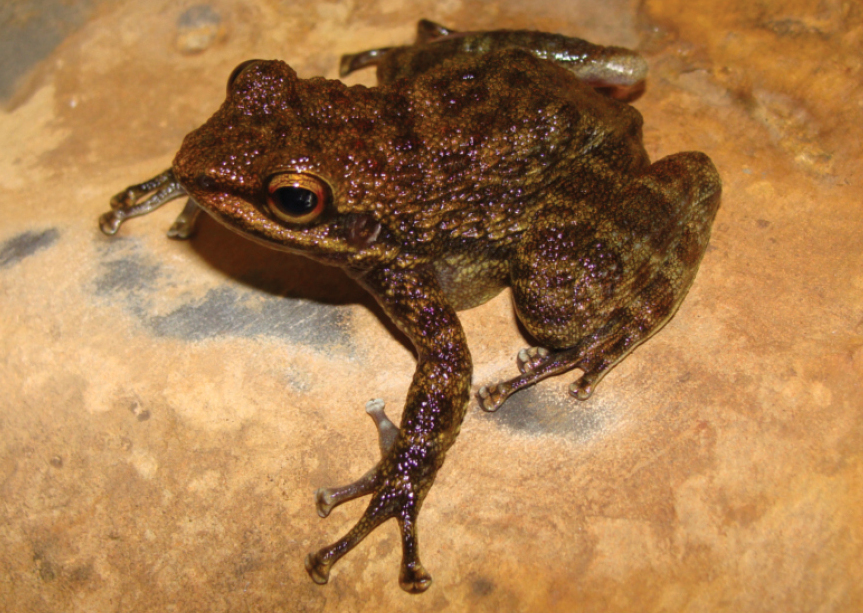
O. smithi, Guinea

There are five species:

- Odontobatrachus arndti Barej et al., 2015
- Odontobatrachus fouta Barej et al., 2015
- Odontobatrachus natator (Boulenger, 1905)
- Odontobatrachus smithi Barej et al., 2015
- Odontobatrachus ziama Barej et al., 2015

== Distribution and habitat ==
Odontobatrachus occurs in the upper Guinean forests, Liberia, Sierra Leone, western parts of the Ivory Coast. They frequent forested country close to mountain streams with strong currents and rapids. The distribution is patchy, but where the species does occur it often is plentiful. Human settlements and activities such as logging, agriculture and mining pose ecological threats to the species, causing the loss of forest habitat, though there are some conserved areas.
