= Harpesaurus ensicauda =

Scientific classification
- Kingdom: Animalia
- Phylum: Chordata
- Class: Reptilia
- Order: Squamata
- Suborder: Iguania
- Family: Agamidae
- Genus: Harpesaurus
- Species: H. ensicauda

Binomial name
- Harpesaurus ensicauda Werner, 1913

Species of lizard

Harpesaurus ensicauda, the Nias nose-horned lizard, is a species of agamid lizard. It is endemic to Indonesia.
