= Harpesaurus beccarii =

Scientific classification
- Kingdom: Animalia
- Phylum: Chordata
- Class: Reptilia
- Order: Squamata
- Suborder: Iguania
- Family: Agamidae
- Genus: Harpesaurus
- Species: H. beccarii

Binomial name
- Harpesaurus beccarii Doria, 1888

Species of lizard

Harpesaurus beccarii, also known commonly as the Sumatra nose-horned lizard or the Sumatran nose-horned lizard, is a species of lizard in the family Agamidae. The species is endemic to Sumatra, Indonesia.

== Etymology ==
The specific name, beccarii, is in honor of Italian botanist Odoardo Beccari.

== Description ==
H. beccarii may attain a snout-to-vent length of 8.6 cm (3.4 in) (not including the rostral appendage), and a tail length of 16.4 cm (6.5 in). The rostral appendage, which measures 1 cm (0.39 in), is double, consisting of a longer anterior "horn" and a shorter posterior "horn". The body is bluish green dorsally.

== Reproduction ==
H. beccarii is oviparous.
