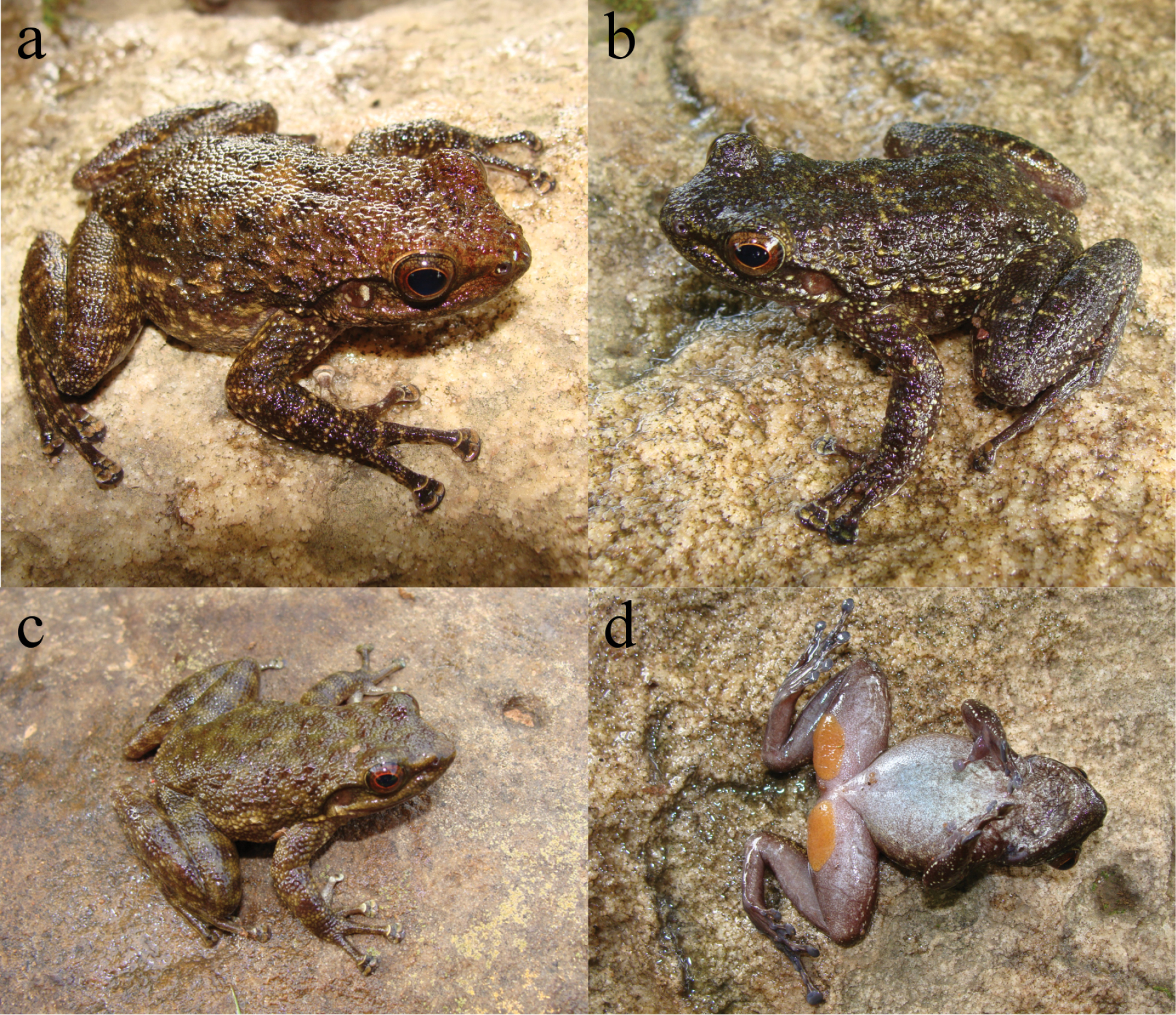

Conservation status
- Endangered (IUCN 3.1)

Scientific classification
- Kingdom: Animalia
- Phylum: Chordata
- Class: Amphibia
- Order: Anura
- Family: Odontobatrachidae
- Genus: Odontobatrachus
- Species: O. fouta

Binomial name
- Odontobatrachus fouta Barej, Schmitz, Penner, Doumbia, Brede, Hillers, and Rödel, 2015

= Odontobatrachus fouta =

Species of amphibian

Odontobatrachus fouta is an endangered species of amphibian in the Odontobatrachidae family.

This species is endemic to Guinea. It is found at altitudes between 650m and 900m in the highland region of Fouta Djallon, and is named after this region.

The males measure between 47.8mm and 57.0mm and the females between 44.1mm and 62.5mm.
