= Harpesaurus borneensis =

Conservation status
- Data Deficient (IUCN 3.1)

Scientific classification
- Kingdom: Animalia
- Phylum: Chordata
- Class: Reptilia
- Order: Squamata
- Suborder: Iguania
- Family: Agamidae
- Genus: Harpesaurus
- Species: H. borneensis

Binomial name
- Harpesaurus borneensis Mertens, 1924)

Species of lizard

Harpesaurus borneensis is a species of agamid lizard. It is endemic to Indonesia.
