= Meristogenys macrophthalmus =

Conservation status
- Data Deficient (IUCN 3.1)

Scientific classification
- Kingdom: Animalia
- Phylum: Chordata
- Class: Amphibia
- Order: Anura
- Family: Ranidae
- Genus: Meristogenys
- Species: M. macrophthalmus

Binomial name
- Meristogenys macrophthalmus (Matsui, 1986)

Synonyms
- Amolops macrophthalmus Matsui, 1986

Species of frog

Meristogenys macrophthalmus is a species of frog in the family Ranidae. It is endemic to Sarawak in northern Borneo (Malaysia) and is only known from its type locality in the Bintulu District. The specific name macrophthalmus is derived from the Greek words macros (="large") and ophthalmos (="eye") and refers to the large eyes of this frog. Common names Matsui's Borneo frog, large-eyed torrent frog, and big-eyed torrent frog have been coined for it.

== Description ==
This species is only known from the holotype, which is an adult male measuring about 37 mm (1.5 in) in snout–vent length. The body is moderately stout. The snout is somewhat blunt. The eyes are large (diameter 6.5 mm (0.3 in)). The tympanum is distinct and also relatively large. The fingers and the toes bear round discs; the toes are fully webbed. Skin is shagreened above. There is a low, glandular dorsolateral fold. The flanks are coarsely granular, the throat smooth, and the venter rugose. Coloration of living animals is unknown; the preserved specimen is grayish-brown dorsal with some indistinct markings. The upper lip is whitish. The limbs have crossbars dorsally. The underside is whitish.

== Habitat and conservation ==
Meristogenys macrophthalmus live primary, hilly, lowland rainforest. Breeding takes place in streams. It is threatened by habitat loss (clear-cutting).

Meristogenys macrophthalmus is only known from the Bintulu District in Sarawak (Malaysia)
