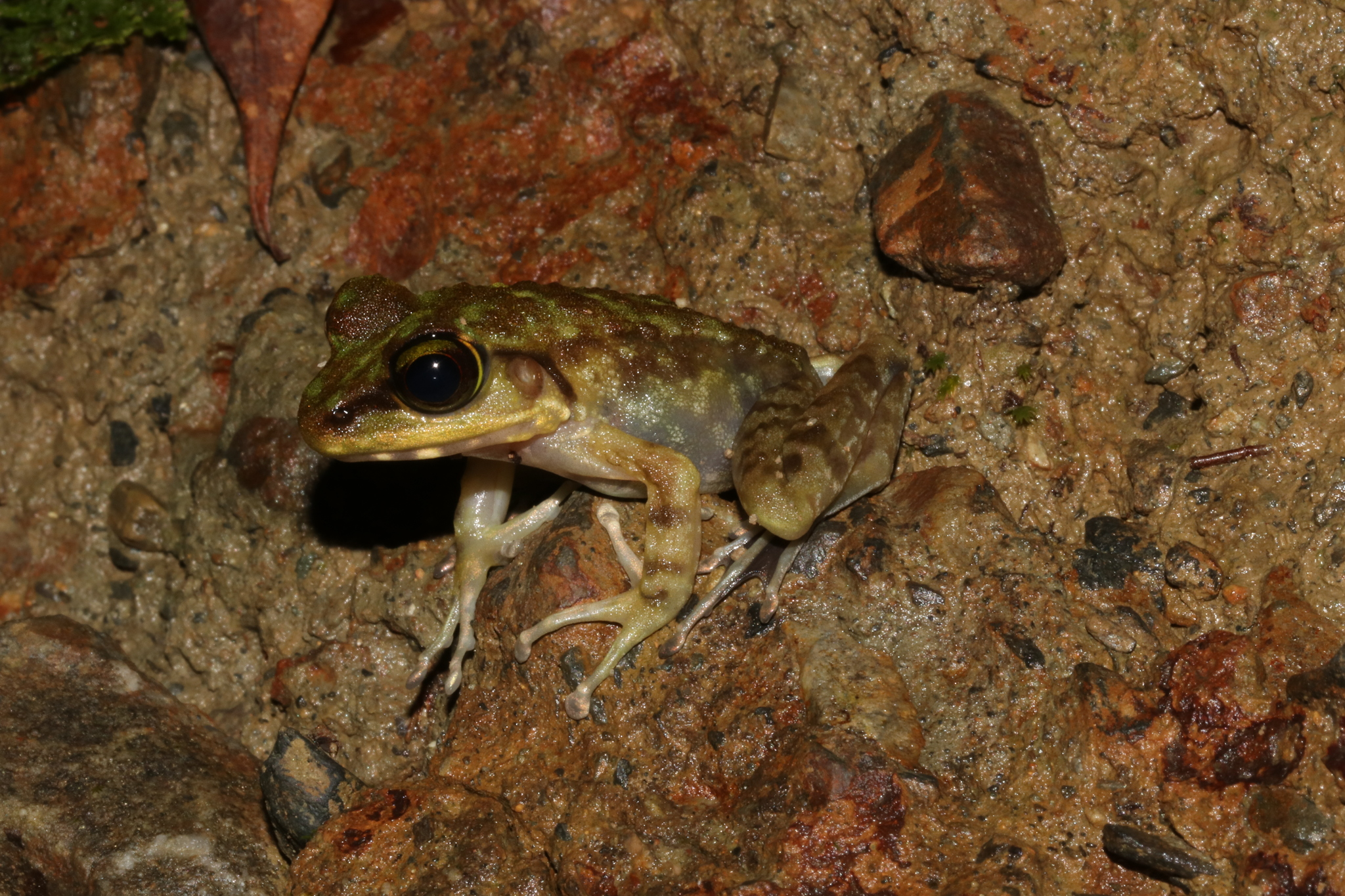

Conservation status
- Least Concern (IUCN 3.1)

Scientific classification
- Kingdom: Animalia
- Phylum: Chordata
- Class: Amphibia
- Order: Anura
- Family: Ranidae
- Genus: Meristogenys
- Species: M. kinabaluensis

Binomial name
- Meristogenys kinabaluensis (Inger, 1966)

Synonyms
- Amolops kinabaluensis Inger, 1966

= Meristogenys kinabaluensis =

Species of frog

Meristogenys kinabaluensis (common names: Kiau Borneo frog, Kinabalu torrent frog) is a species of frog in the family Ranidae. It is endemic to Borneo and is found in Sabah, Sarawak (Malaysia), and Kalimantan (Indonesia). The specific name refers to its type locality, Mount Kinabalu.

== Description ==
Males measure typically 50–68 mm (2.0–2.7 in) whereas females can grow to 90 mm (3.5 in) in snout–vent length. The snout is blunt; the body is slightly more stocky compared to some other Meristogenys species. The skin on the dorsum has smooth warts. The dominant color is green, including the eyes.

The tadpoles can grow to 60 mm (2.4 in) in total length and are light brown with a yellow hue. The tail is strong and the snout and body are depressed and streamlined.

== Habitat and conservation ==
Its natural habitats are submontane and montane forest at 750–1,700 m (2,460–5,580 ft) above sea level. Breeding takes place small, clear, rocky streams. These frogs are often found at night perching 1–2 m high on tree trunks or branches by rocky streams. The tadpoles cling to the rocks where the current is strong, presumably feeding on lithophytic algae.

The species is threatened by habitat loss, although it occurs in a number of protected areas, i.e., in the Kinabalu Park, Crocker Range National Park, Kayan Mentarang National Park, and Gunung Mulu National Park.
