= Meristogenys amoropalamus =

Conservation status
- Least Concern (IUCN 3.1)

Scientific classification
- Kingdom: Animalia
- Phylum: Chordata
- Class: Amphibia
- Order: Anura
- Family: Ranidae
- Genus: Meristogenys
- Species: M. amoropalamus

Binomial name
- Meristogenys amoropalamus (Matsui, 1986)

Synonyms
- Amolops amoropalamus Matsui, 1986

Species of amphibian

Meristogenys amoropalamus is a species of frog in the family Ranidae. It is endemic to northern Borneo and occurs in northwestern Sabah and northeastern Sarawak (Malaysia) and in northeastern Kalimantan (Indonesia). Common names mountain Borneo frog and mountain torrent frog have been coined for it. Studies of its larvae revealed that the nominal species contained two cryptic forms, and in 2011, Shimada and colleagues described Meristogenys dyscritus as a separate species.

== Etymology ==
The specific name amoropalamus is derived from the Greek words amoros (="incomplete") and palame (="web") and refers to the poorly developed toe webbing of this species.

== Description ==
Adult females grow to about 80 mm (3.1 in) snout–vent length, whereas males are considerably smaller. The maximum lengths reported by Shimada and colleagues are 40 and 67 mm (1.6 and 2.6 in) for males and females, respectively. Males are less robustly built than females and have a relatively much larger tympanum. The snout is comparatively blunt. The fingers and the toes bear round discs; the toes are fully only partially webbed. The dorsum is light brown and has small dark spots on the trunk. The lower parts are whitish.

== Habitat and conservation ==
Meristogenys amoropalamus live in montane forests at elevations of 1,000–2,200 m (3,300–7,200 ft) above sea level and are only encountered along the banks of clear, rocky streams. The tadpoles adhere to rocks and feed on lithophytes.

This species is threatened by habitat loss caused by logging and agricultural activities. It is also collected for food. It occurs in the Kinabalu and Crocker Range National Park in Malaysia, and in the Betung Kerihun National Park and Pulong Tau National Park in Indonesia; the latter is not (yet) well protected.
