= Sphenomorphus modiglianii =

Conservation status
- Endangered (IUCN 3.1)

Scientific classification
- Kingdom: Animalia
- Phylum: Chordata
- Class: Reptilia
- Order: Squamata
- Family: Scincidae
- Genus: Sphenomorphus
- Species: S. modiglianii

Binomial name
- Sphenomorphus modiglianii (Boulenger, 1894)

Synonyms
- Lygosoma modiglianii Boulenger, 1894

Species of lizard

Sphenomorphus modiglianii is a species of lizard in the subfamily Sphenomorphinae of the family Scincidae (skinks). The species is native to Indonesia.

== Etymology ==
The specific name, modiglianii, is in honor of Italian zoologist Elio Modigliani.

== Habitat ==
The preferred natural habitat of Sphenomorphus modiglianii is forest, at elevations from sea level to 129 m (423 ft).

== Reproduction ==
The mode of reproduction of Sphenomorphus modiglianii is unknown.
