= Siamese cascade frog =

Conservation status
- Least Concern (IUCN 3.1)

Scientific classification
- Kingdom: Animalia
- Phylum: Chordata
- Class: Amphibia
- Order: Anura
- Family: Ranidae
- Genus: Wijayarana
- Species: W. melasma

Binomial name
- Wijayarana melasma (Stuart and Chan-ard, 2005)

Synonyms
- Huia melasma Stuart and Chan-ard, 2005; Odorrana melasma (Che, Pang, Zhao, Wu, Zhao, and Zhang, 2007)

Species of amphibian

The Siamese cascade frog or spotted-snout frog (Wijayarana melasma) is a species of frogs in the family Ranidae. It is endemic to western and northern Thailand and known from Kanchanaburi, Prachuap Kiri Khan, and Chiang Mai Provinces.

== Taxonomy ==
Wijayarana melasma is sometimes placed in the genus Odorrana, but actually seems to belong neither there nor in Huia, at least if the latter genus is defined in the strict sense. In 2021, it was reclassified into the new genus Wijayarana.

== Description ==
Males in the type series measure 54–55 mm (2.1–2.2 in) in snout–vent length. No females were collected but a photographed individual presumed to be female measured 69 mm (2.7 in) in snout–vent length.

The overall appearance of this species is moderately slender. The head is narrow with obtusely pointed snout. The tympanum is distinct. The fingers are unwebbed but have tips that are expanded to small discs; the toes are strongly webbed and have discs at their tips. Skin on the dorsum is shagreened; on the sides and venter skin is smooth. The dorsolateral fold is weak.

== Habitat and conservation ==
Wijayarana melasma live near streams and waterfalls in moist lowland evergreen and semi-evergreen forestat elevations of 200–600 m (660–1,970 ft) above sea level. The known locations are within protected areas (including Chaloem Rattanakosin National Park and Kaeng Krachan National Park), although habitat change from agriculture, fire, tourism development, and illegal logging continues to occur.
