= Cnemaspis modiglianii =

Conservation status
- Least Concern (IUCN 3.1)

Scientific classification
- Kingdom: Animalia
- Phylum: Chordata
- Class: Reptilia
- Order: Squamata
- Suborder: Gekkota
- Family: Gekkonidae
- Genus: Cnemaspis
- Species: C. modiglianii

Binomial name
- Cnemaspis modiglianii Das, 2005

Species of reptile

Cnemaspis modiglianii is a species of gecko, a lizard in the family Gekkonidae. The species is endemic to Indonesia.

== Etymology ==
The specific name, modiglianii, is in honor of Italian anthropologist Elio Modigliani.

== Geographic distribution ==
In Indonesia Cnemaspis modiglianii is found on Enggano Island and on the islands of the Mentawai Archipelago.

== Habitat ==
The preferred natural habitat of Cnemaspis modiglianii is forest.

== Description ==
The maximum recorded snout-to-vent length (SVL) for Cnemaspis modiglianii is 33.6 mm (1.32 in).

== Reproduction ==
Cnemaspis modiglianii is oviparous.
