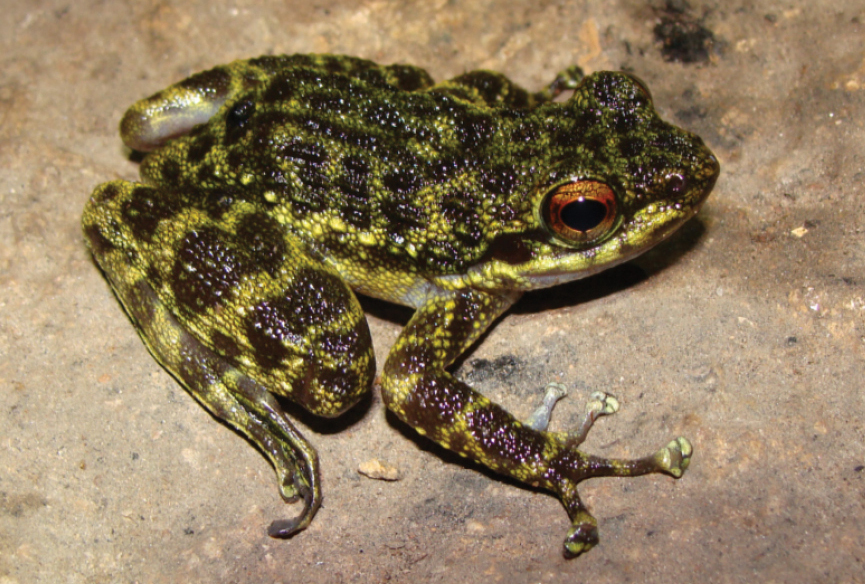

Conservation status
- Least Concern (IUCN 3.1)

Scientific classification
- Kingdom: Animalia
- Phylum: Chordata
- Class: Amphibia
- Order: Anura
- Family: Odontobatrachidae
- Genus: Odontobatrachus
- Species: O. natator

Binomial name
- Odontobatrachus natator (Boulenger, 1905)

Synonyms
- Petropedetes natator Boulenger, 1905

= Odontobatrachus natator =

Species of amphibian

Odontobatrachus natator, also known as the saber-toothed frog, Sierra Leone water frog, common toothed frog, or simply swimmer, is a species of frog in the family Odontobatrachidae. It is endemic to West Africa and occurs in Guinea, Liberia, and Sierra Leone. Earlier records from Ivory Coast refer to Odontobatrachus arndti.

Odontobatrachus natator occurs in forested, hilly areas in or near water, breeding in fast-flowing streams. The eggs are laid on land. The tadpole adhere themselves to rocks in waterfalls and rapids by means of suckers. It is patchily distributed but can locally be very abundant. It is probably threatened by the loss of forest habitat caused by agricultural development, logging, and expanding human settlements, and locally also by mining activities. It is present in a few protected areas.
