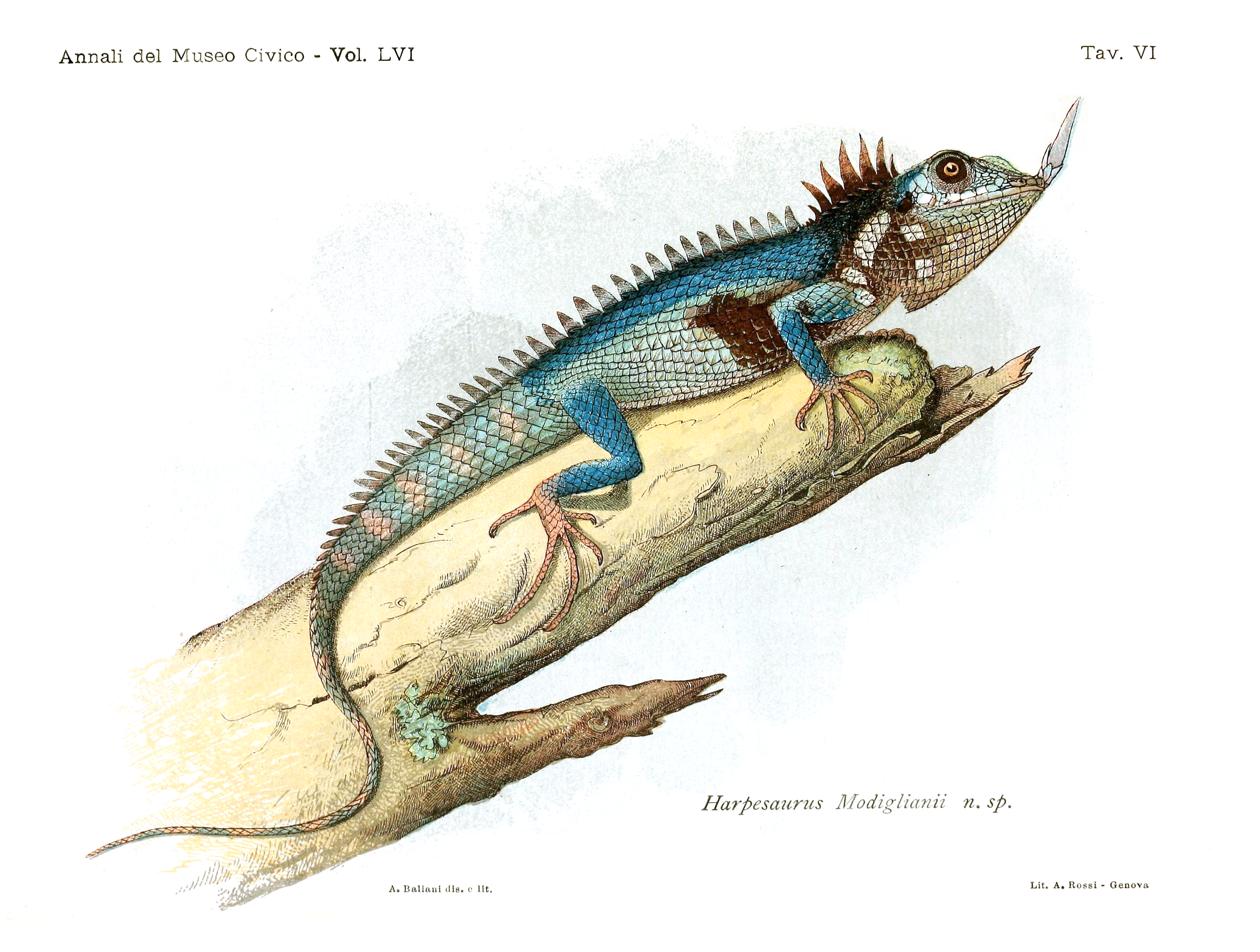

Scientific classification
- Kingdom: Animalia
- Phylum: Chordata
- Class: Reptilia
- Order: Squamata
- Suborder: Iguania
- Family: Agamidae
- Subfamily: Draconinae
- Genus: Harpesaurus; Boulenger, 1885

= Harpesaurus =

Genus of lizards

Harpesaurus is a genus of lizards in the family Agamidae. The genus is endemic to Indonesia.

Each of the 6 species are known from at most only a few specimens.

== Geographic range ==
Species of the genus Harpesaurus are found on the Greater Sunda Islands.

== Habitat ==
The natural habitat of lizards of the genus Harpesaurus is forests.

== Species ==
Six species are recognized as being valid.

Species	Common name	Range
Harpesaurus beccarii Doria, 1888	Sumatra nose-horned lizard	Sumatra
Harpesaurus borneensis (Mertens, 1924)		Borneo
Harpesaurus brooksi (Parker, 1924)		Sumatra
Harpesaurus ensicauda F. Werner, 1913	Nias nose-horned lizard	Nias
Harpesaurus modiglianii Vinciguerra, 1933	Modigliani's nose-horned lizard	Sumatra
Harpesaurus tricinctus (A.H.A. Duméril in A.M.C. Duméril & A.H.A. Duméril, 1851)	Java nose-horned lizard	Likely Java

The species formerly known as H. thescelorhinos King, 1978 is a synonym of H. borneensis.

The Sumatran species H. modiglianii was previously known only from the type specimen, collected in 1891, but was found again in 2018.

Nota bene: A binomial authority in parentheses indicates that the species was originally described in a genus other than Harpesaurus.
