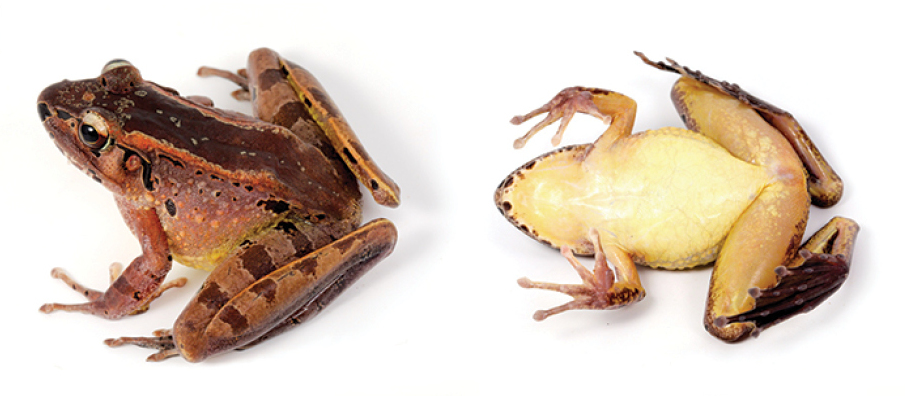

Conservation status
- Least Concern (IUCN 3.1)

Scientific classification
- Kingdom: Animalia
- Phylum: Chordata
- Class: Amphibia
- Order: Anura
- Family: Ranidae
- Genus: Huia; Yang, 1991
- Species: H. cavitympanum

Binomial name
- Huia cavitympanum (Boulenger, 1896)

= Hole-in-the-head frog =

Species of amphibian

The hole-in-the-head frog (Huia cavitympanum) is a species of frog in the family Ranidae. It is the only member of the genus Huia. It is found on the island of Borneo. Its natural habitats are subtropical or tropical moist lowland forests, subtropical or tropical moist montane forests, and torrential rivers. It is threatened by habitat loss. The genus name honors Chinese herpetologist Shuchin Hu.

H. cavitympanum is the first species of frog and first non-mammalian vertebrate found to vocalize at only an ultrasonic level. Other frogs, such as Odorrana tormota, have been found to both emit and hear ultrasound, though not exclusively. The frogs have eardrums recessed in the side of the skull, with an ear canal similar to mammals' anatomy. It appears to have evolved this higher pitch (more than 20 kHz) frequency of communication to circumvent the background noise of its waterfall habitat.

== Taxonomy ==
H. cavitympanum is now considered the only member of this genus, but it was formerly a polyphyletic "wastebin taxon" with up to some 55 species. These included some originally placed into the genera Odorrana and Eburana, which formed a paraphyletic cluster; indeed these two genera are sometimes treated as junior synonyms of Huia. But many of the moves to Huia are now considered premature and Odorrana is now treated as valid as opposed to expanding Huia.

Up till 2021, the genus was still paraphyletic with respect to Meristogenys. Suggested treatments included subsuming Meristogenys into the genus, or restricting Huia to the type species (H. cavitympanum) and what might be its closest living relatives (e.g. an undescribed species from Sumatra), and splitting off some other species of Huia - e.g. the Sumatran torrent frog (H. sumatrana). Meristogenys tadpoles are furthermore characterized by a split and ridged upper lip not found in the hole-in-the-head frog, indicating that the genera should kept separate. This was ultimately resolved in 2021 by splitting off all non-cavitympanum species into the new genus Wijayarana, leaving the genus Huia monotypic.

== See also ==
- Concave-eared torrent frog (Odorrana tormota)
- Javan torrent frog (Wijayarana masonii)
