= Elio Modigliani =

Italian scientist

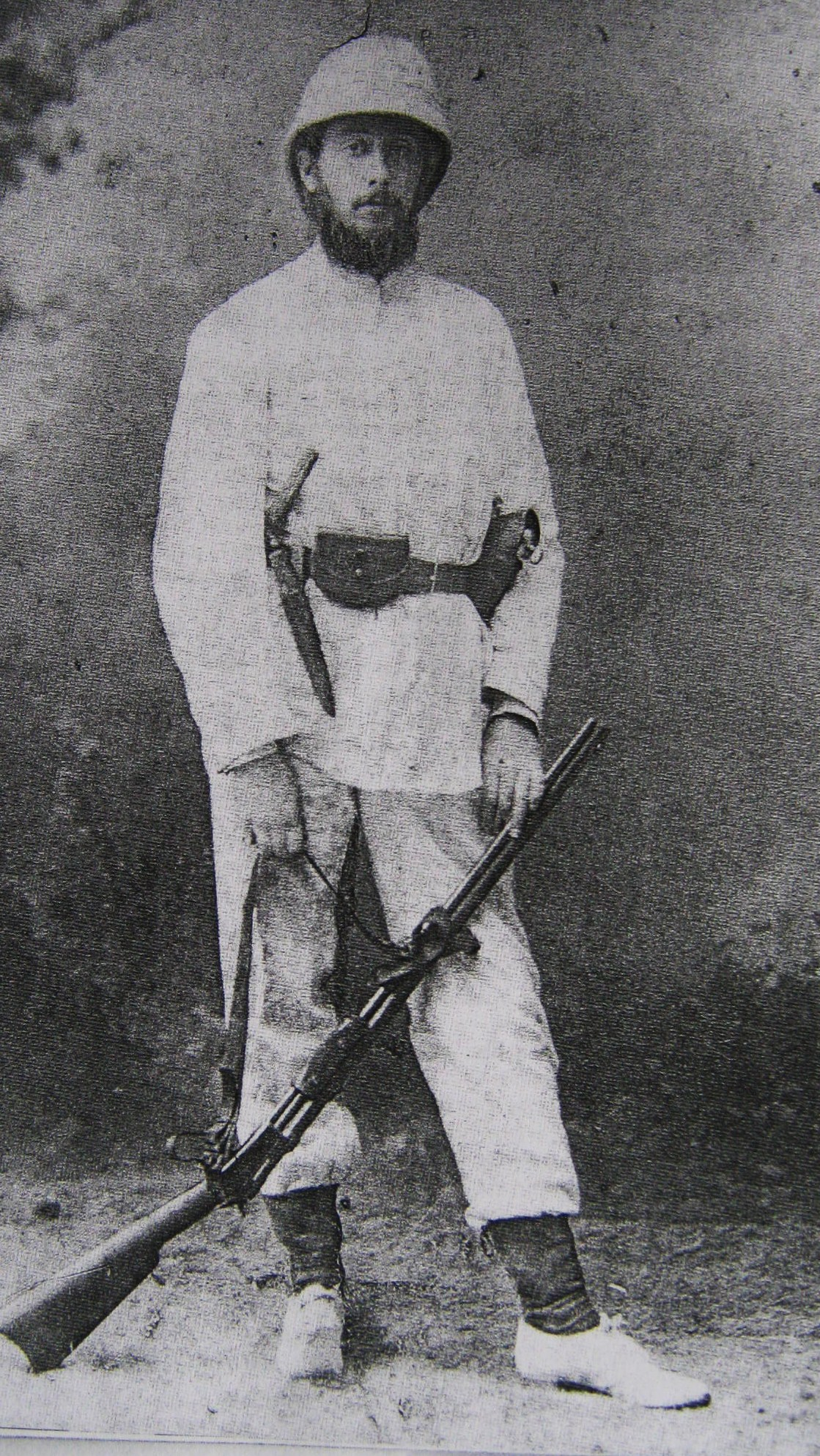
- Modigliani in Nias, 1886
- Born: 13 June 1860; Florence, Kingdom of Sardinia
- Died: August 6, 1932 (aged 72); Viareggio, Kingdom of Italy
- Occupations: Anthropologist, zoologist
- Spouse: Catherine McDonell

Elio Modigliani (13 June 1860 – 6 August 1932) was an Italian anthropologist, zoologist, explorer, and plant collector.

== Biography ==
The son of a Florentine banker, he first made his name in the Italian scientific community at the age of 20, when he explored a cave near Genoa, discovering Neolithic remains of exceptional value. He thus was introduced to eminent scientists and explorers such as Odoardo Beccari (who had explored Malaysia and Sumatra in 1872), Giacomo Doria, and Arturo Issael. Modigliani was also a disciple of Cesare Lombroso, an eminent anthropologist, criminologist and jurist, who was the Italian herald of physiognomy.

=== Travels to the Indonesian archipelago ===
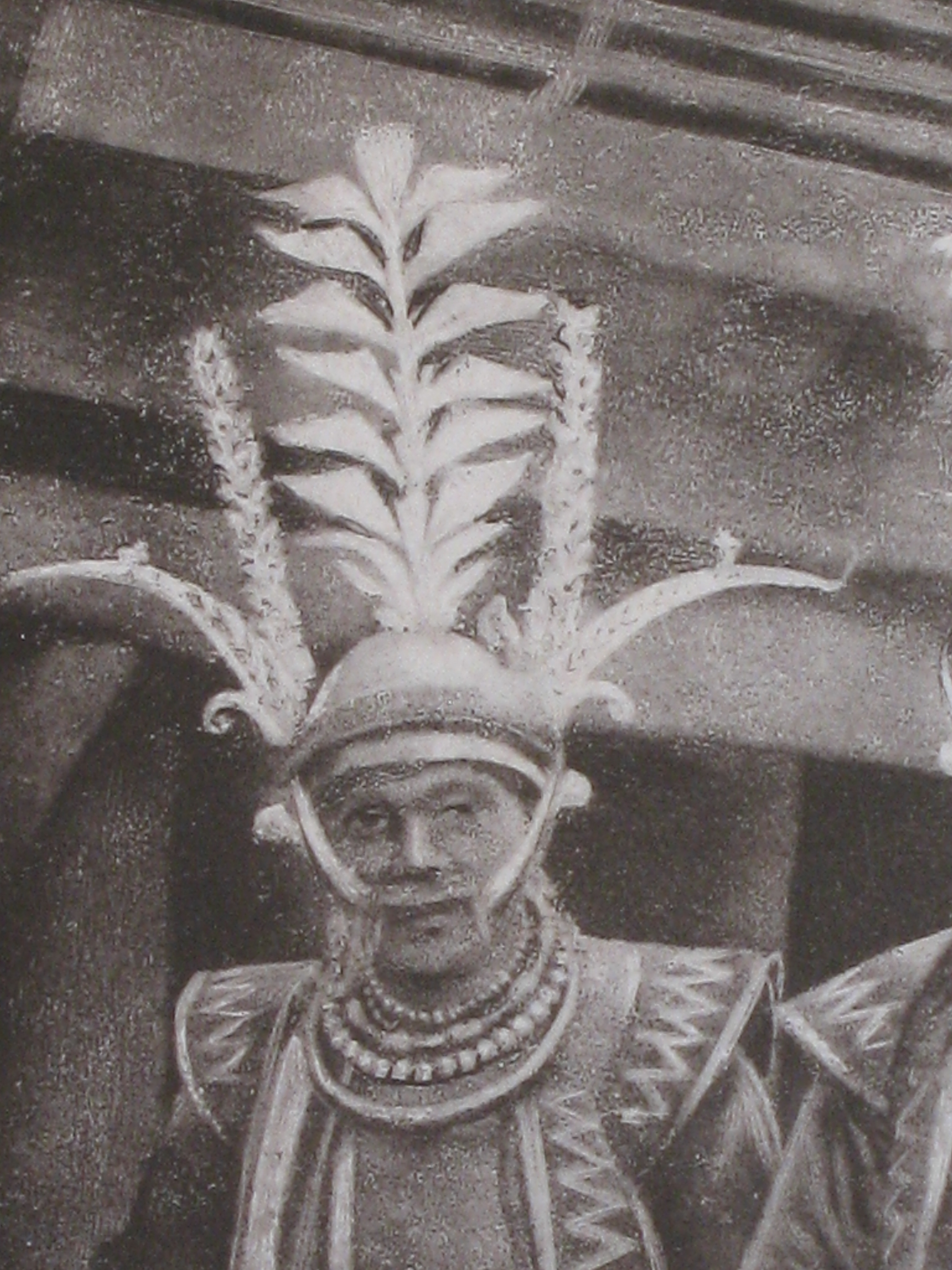
Siduho Gheo, chief of Hili Dgiono, 1886

Between 1886 and 1894, Modigliani explored Sumatra and a number of islands off its western coast. His first trip, in 1886, was to the island of Nias, of which he explored the southern region (Nias Salatan), travelling among head-hunting tribes. He came back unscathed, and wrote his first book, Un viaggio a Nias. Nias Salatan at the time was forbidden territory for all foreigners, and Dutch military and naval expeditions had failed time and again to impose colonial rule in this region, populated by redoutable head hunters. Moreover, the head hunters' villages were at war with each other at the time of his visit, and Modigliani was travelling with the sole company of four Javanese tracker hunters, i.e., virtually undefended; and he personally clashed with high-ranking members of Nias society, including the redoutable Siwa Sahilu, who commanded some 2,000 warriors out of his village of Hili Simaetano. Yet, Elio Modigliani managed to save his own head and that of his men, and bring back a formidable collection of Nias artefacts for the Ethnographic Museum of Florence, where they are presently on display. During his exploration, Modigliani was faced on several occasions with highly dangerous situations, and yet he never had to fire a shot nor even to level his weapons against a warrior. He managed to resolve any conflict through a mixture of psychological warfare and empathy. Likewise, his main opponent, Chief Siwa Sahilu, was a subtle strategist and his equal at this game. Their dueling was reconstructed through the research of Vanni Puccioni, who in 2010 collected the memories of the warriors' descendants in Nias Salatan.

Modigliani visited Enggano Island between April 25 and July 13, 1891. He detailed the apparently dominant role of women in Enggano culture in L'Isola delle Donne (The Island of Women), first published in 1894.

== Legacy ==
Elio Modigliani is honored in the scientific names of five species of Indonesian reptiles: Cnemaspis modiglianii, Draco modiglianii, Harpesaurus modiglianii, Pseudorabdion modiglianii, and Sphenomorphus modiglianii. A Sumatran frog is named for him: Wijayarana modiglianii.
