= Harpesaurus tricinctus =

Scientific classification
- Kingdom: Animalia
- Phylum: Chordata
- Class: Reptilia
- Order: Squamata
- Suborder: Iguania
- Family: Agamidae
- Genus: Harpesaurus
- Species: H. tricinctus

Binomial name
- Harpesaurus tricinctus (Duméril, 1851)

Species of lizard

Harpesaurus tricinctus, the Java nose-horned lizard, is a species of agamid lizard. It is endemic to Indonesia.

A single desiccated specimen of the species is known, collected some years before the species' description in 1851. Since then, the species has not been sighted again, and as such is possibly extinct. Although the sole specimen was recorded as being collected in Java, this could not be confirmed as no date or collector name is associated with the specimen. As such, its collection from any of the other Sunda Islands could not be ruled out.

The holotype, i.e., the sole known specimen is around 25 cm long, and allegedly a male. Like other in the genus Harpesaurus, it sported a long horn like scale on the tip of its snout.
