= Meristogenys poecilus =

Conservation status
- Least Concern (IUCN 3.1)

Scientific classification
- Kingdom: Animalia
- Phylum: Chordata
- Class: Amphibia
- Order: Anura
- Family: Ranidae
- Genus: Meristogenys
- Species: M. poecilus

Binomial name
- Meristogenys poecilus (Inger and Gritis, 1983)

Synonyms
- Amolops poecilus Inger and Gritis, 1983

Species of frog

Meristogenys poecilus is a species of frog in the family Ranidae. It is endemic to Borneo and known from between central Sarawak (Malaysia) and central Kalimantan (Indonesia). The specific name poecilus is derived from the Greek poikolos, meaning "pied" or "blotched", in reference to diagnostic pattern on rear of the thigh. Common name Malaysian Borneo frog has been coined for this species.

== Description ==
Males typically measure 41–52 mm (1.6–2.0 in) and females 69–78 mm (2.7–3.1 in) in snout–vent length. The snout is obtusely pointed and projecting beyond the jaw. The tympanum is visible. The fingers and the toes bear round discs; the toes are fully webbed. The legs are relatively long. Skin is dorsally shagreened; indistinct dorsolateral folds are present. The lower surfaces are rugose, except for the throat that is smooth. Dorsal colouration is chocolate brown, with darker flanks. The upper lip is whitish and the lower lip is barred black and white. A dark brown to blackish brown band runs from the eye to the inguinal region. The throat is white to pale yellow; the venter is yellow; some individuals have faint dark mottling on the throat and the chest whereas others may be completely dark brown. The legs are dorsally barred. The rear of the thigh in preserved specimens shows irregular light blotches (presumably yellow in life) on dark brown background.

== Habitat and conservation ==
Meristogenys poecilus occurs in hilly lowland rainforests. Breeding takes place along small, clear, rocky streams where the tadpoles cling to the rocks, feeding on lithophytic algae.

This species is locally abundant. It is threatened by habitat loss caused by clear-cutting. It is present in the Lanjak Entimau Wildlife Sanctuary and in the Betung-Kerikum National Park.
