= Pseudorabdion modiglianii =

Conservation status
- Data Deficient (IUCN 3.1)

Scientific classification
- Kingdom: Animalia
- Phylum: Chordata
- Class: Reptilia
- Order: Squamata
- Suborder: Serpentes
- Family: Colubridae
- Genus: Pseudorabdion
- Species: P. modiglianii

Binomial name
- Pseudorabdion modiglianii Giu. Doria & Petri, 2010

Species of snake

Pseudorabdion modiglianii, also known commonly as Modigliani's dwarf reed snake, is a species of snake in the subfamily Calamariinae of the family Colubridae. The species is native to Indonesia.

== Etymology ==
The specific name, modiglianii, is in honor of Italian zoologist Elio Modigliani.
