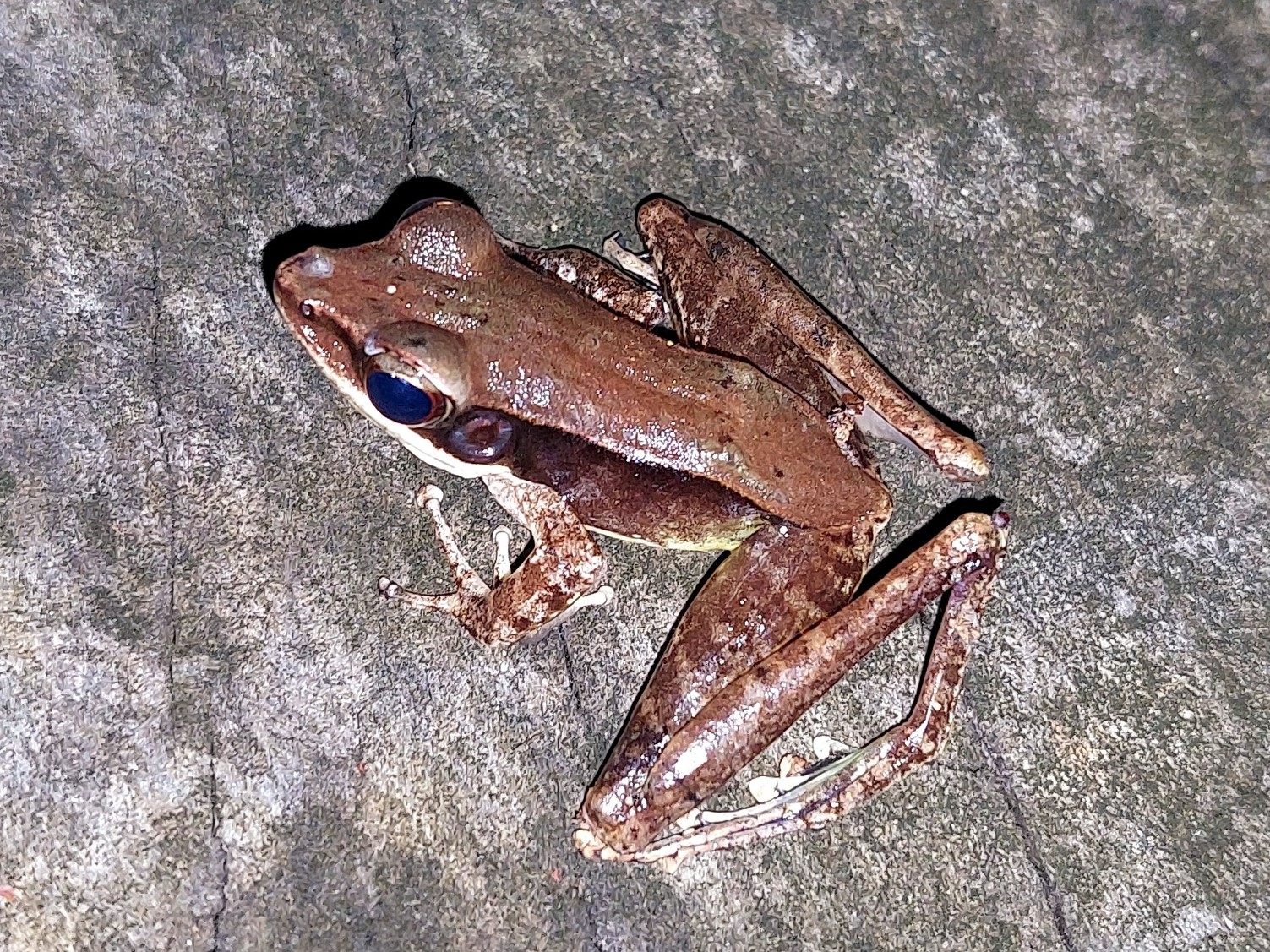

Conservation status
- Least Concern (IUCN 3.1)

Scientific classification
- Kingdom: Animalia
- Phylum: Chordata
- Class: Amphibia
- Order: Anura
- Family: Ranidae
- Genus: Meristogenys
- Species: M. phaeomerus

Binomial name
- Meristogenys phaeomerus (Inger and Gritis, 1983)

Synonyms
- Amolops phaeomerus Inger and Gritis, 1983

= Meristogenys phaeomerus =

Species of frog

Meristogenys phaeomerus is a species of frog in the family Ranidae. It is endemic to Borneo and known from central Sarawak (Malaysia) and adjacent Kalimantan (Indonesia). The specific name phaeomerus is derived from the Greek phaios for "dusky" and meros for "thigh", in reference to the appearance of the rear of the thigh. Common names Kapit Borneo frog and Kapit torrent frog have been coined for it.

== Description ==
Males measure 33–44 mm (1.3–1.7 in) and females 57–72 mm (2.2–2.8 in) in snout–vent length. The overall appearance is moderately slender. The snout is obtusely pointed. The tympanum is distinct. The fingers and the toes bear discs with circummarginal grooves. The toes are fully webbed. The dorsum is chocolate brown with small dark spots on the trunk. The upper lip is light brown. The lore bears an indistinct dark streak under the canthus. A blackish brown band runs from behind the eye to the inguinal area. The rear of the thigh is dark brown with small light spots.

The tadpoles have a maximum head–body length of about 15 mm (0.6 in).

== Habitat and conservation ==
Meristogenys phaeomerus occurs in hilly lowland rainforests at elevations below 300 m (980 ft). Breeding takes place along small, clear, rocky streams. The tadpoles adhere to the rocks, feeding on lithophytic algae.

This species is locally abundant, but it does not appear to adapt to modified habitats and is threatened by habitat loss caused by clear-cutting. It is present in several protected areas.
