= Meristogenys whiteheadi =

Conservation status
- Least Concern (IUCN 3.1)

Scientific classification
- Kingdom: Animalia
- Phylum: Chordata
- Class: Amphibia
- Order: Anura
- Family: Ranidae
- Genus: Meristogenys
- Species: M. whiteheadi

Binomial name
- Meristogenys whiteheadi (Boulenger, 1887)

Synonyms
- Rana whiteheadi Boulenger, 1887; Amolops whiteheadi (Boulenger, 1887)

Species of frog

Meristogenys whiteheadi is a species of frog in the family Ranidae. It is endemic to Borneo and found in both Indonesia (Kalimantan) and Malaysia (western Sabah). Meristogenys stigmachilus and Meristogenys stenocephalus, described as new species in 2011, were formerly included in this species. Owing to the difficulty of distinguishing these species under field conditions, the exact range of this species is uncertain. Its common name is Whitehead's Borneo frog or Whitehead's torrent frog.

== Etymology ==
This species is named after John Whitehead, explorer who collected the type series from Mount Kinabalu, Malaysia.

== Description ==
The dorsum is light brown to greenish dark brown. The lips are dark grey to black. The iris is bicoloured, with a reddish orange horizontal band in the middle surrounded by whitish brown bands above and below. The centre of the tympanum usually has a small light circle. The limbs have alternating light- and dark-brown dorsal cross-bars. The rear of thigh is light brown with scattered light dots. The throat and chest are whitish, with dark dots; abdomen is whitish. The legs are whitish ventrally, with patches of pigmentation. The pattern may vary between locations.

Meristogenys whiteheadi are relatively large frogs. Males from Sabah measured 49–62 mm (1.9–2.4 in) in snout–vent length (SVL) and females 78–87 mm (3.1–3.4 in) SVL. Males from Sarawak measured 49–57 mm (1.9–2.2 in) SVL and females 77–80 mm (3.0–3.1 in) SVL.

== Habitat and conservation ==
Meristogenys whiteheadi occur in hilly rainforests at elevations below 1,300 m (4,300 ft). They breed in clear, rocky streams. The tadpoles cling to the rocks in strong currents and feed on lithophytic algae.

Meristogenys whiteheadi is threatened by habitat loss caused by logging. The resulting siltation of streams destroys the larval habitat. This species is present in the Kinabalu, Crocker Range, and Kayan Mentarang National Parks
