= Sumatran torrent frog =

Conservation status
- Least Concern (IUCN 3.1)

Scientific classification
- Kingdom: Animalia
- Phylum: Chordata
- Class: Amphibia
- Order: Anura
- Family: Ranidae
- Genus: Wijayarana
- Species: W. sumatrana

Binomial name
- Wijayarana sumatrana (Yang, 1991)

Synonyms
- Huia sumatrana Yang, 1991

Species of amphibian

The Sumatran torrent frog (Wijayarana sumatrana) is a species of frog in the family Ranidae. It is endemic to Indonesia. The informally assigned common name for frogs in this genus (and for frogs in certain other genera) is torrent frog.

Its natural habitats are subtropical or tropical moist lowland forests, subtropical or tropical moist montane forests, and rivers. It is threatened by habitat loss.

Sumatran torrent frog has recessed tympanal membrane, which suggest that it is able to hear high-frequency sounds.
