= Draco modiglianii =

Conservation status
- Least Concern (IUCN 3.1)

Scientific classification
- Kingdom: Animalia
- Phylum: Chordata
- Class: Reptilia
- Order: Squamata
- Suborder: Iguania
- Family: Agamidae
- Genus: Draco
- Species: D. modiglianii

Binomial name
- Draco modiglianii Vinciguerra, 1892
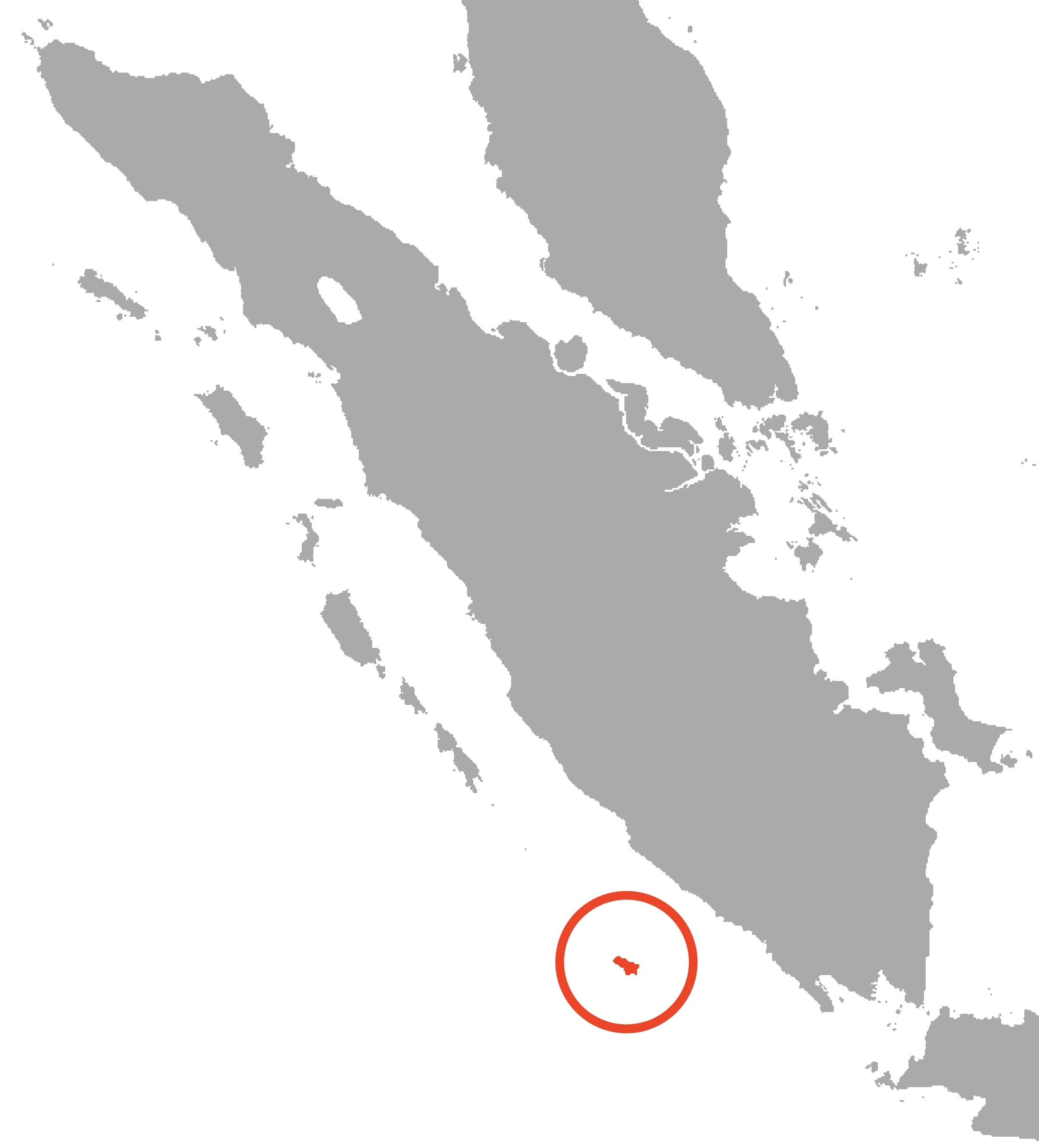

Synonyms
- Draco lineatus modiglianii Vinciguerra, 1892

Species of lizard

Draco modiglianii, also known commonly as the Enggano flying lizard, the lined flying dragon, and Modigliani's flying dragon, is a species of lizard in the subfamily Draconinae of the family Agamidae. The species is native to in Indonesia.

== Etymology ==
The specific name, modiglianii, is in honor of Italian zoologist Elio Modigliani.

== Description ==
Draco modigliannii may attain a snout-to-vent length (SVL) of 7 cm (2.8 in). It has 6–9 upper labials. The "wing" (patagium) contains 6–7 ribs.

== Geographic distribution ==
Draco modiglianii is endemic to Enggano Island, a small island 80 km (50 mi) off the west coast of Sumatra, Indonesia.

== Habitat ==
The preferred natural habitat of Draco modiglianii is forest, at elevations from sea level to 200 m (660 ft), but it has also been found in plantations and villages.

== Reproduction ==
Draco modiglianii is oviparous.
