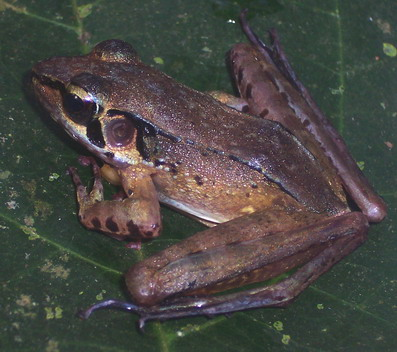

Conservation status
- Least Concern (IUCN 3.1)

Scientific classification
- Kingdom: Animalia
- Phylum: Chordata
- Class: Amphibia
- Order: Anura
- Family: Ranidae
- Genus: Wijayarana
- Species: W. masonii

Binomial name
- Wijayarana masonii (Boulenger, 1884)

Synonyms
- Rana masonii Boulenger, 1884; Huia masonii Iskandar, 1998

= Javan torrent frog =

Species of amphibian

The Javan torrent frog (Wijayarana masonii) is a species of frog in the family Ranidae. It is endemic to Java, Indonesia. It is found in Mount Halimun Salak National Park, Ujung Kulon National Park, and Gunung Gede Pangrango National Park in West Java, as well as in Dieng Nature Reserve in Central Java.

Its natural habitats are clear, fast-flowing streams and torrents in forests and in somewhat more open areas. It is a common species within this specific habitat, which is being threatened by sedimentation of streams as well as agro-chemical pollution.

Javan torrent frog males use high-frequency communication to overcome the noise of their riverine habitats that is dominated by low frequencies. The second harmonic of the calls is ultrasonic. Warbles are highly diverse and may function as vocal signatures.

== See also ==
- Concave-eared torrent frog (Odorrana tormota), the first frog demonstrated to both produce and perceive ultrasonic frequencies
- Hole-in-the-head frog (Huia cavitympanum), a truly ultrasonic frog
