= Grass frog (disambiguation) =

The grass frog (Ptychadena) is a genus of frogs in the family Ptychadenidae, distributed in Sub-Saharan Africa as well as nilotic Egypt

Grass frog may also refer to:

- Asiatic grass frog (Rana chensinensis), a frog in the family Ranidae found in China and Mongolia
- European grass frog (Rana temporaria), a frog in the family Ranidae found throughout much of Europe
- Forrer's grass frog (Lithobates forreri), a frog in the family Ranidae found in Costa Rica, El Salvador, Guatemala, Honduras, Mexico, and Nicaragua
- Growling grass frog (Litoria raniformis), a frog in the family Hylidae native to southern South Australia, Victoria, New South Wales, and Tasmania, Australia
- Little grass frog (Pseudacris ocularis), a frog in the family Hylidae endemic to the Southeastern United States
- Spotted grass frog (Limnodynastes tasmaniensis), a frog in the family Myobatrachidae native to all of New South Wales and Victoria, eastern South Australia, the majority of Queensland, and eastern Tasmania, Australia
- Two-striped grass frog (Hylarana taipehensis), a frog in the family Ranidae found in northeastern India, Bangladesh, Cambodia, southern China, Hong Kong, Laos, Myanmar, Taiwan, Thailand, and Vietnam
