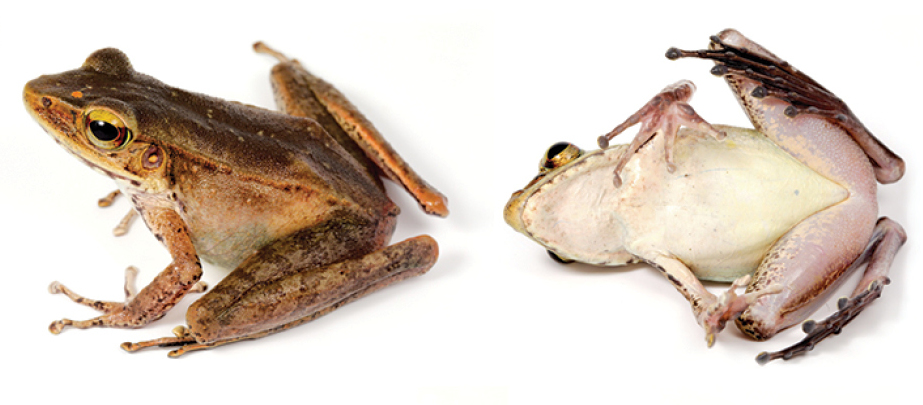
- M. orphnocnemis

Scientific classification
- Kingdom: Animalia
- Phylum: Chordata
- Class: Amphibia
- Order: Anura
- Family: Ranidae
- Genus: Meristogenys; Yang, 1991

Type species
- Hylarana jerboa Günther, 1872

Species
- 13 (see text)

= Meristogenys =

Genus of amphibians

Meristogenys is a genus of true frogs from Borneo. Its tadpoles are adapted to fast-flowing mountain streams and easily recognizable by their divided upper lip with ribs on the outside.

== Taxonomy and systematics ==
Its closest living relative is apparently the hole-in-the-head frog (Huia cavitympanum), type species of the highly polyphyletic "wastebin genus" Huia. Meristogenys, having been proposed far more recently than Huia, might be included in the latter on grounds of phylogeny, as most if not all species placed in the Huia seem to belong elsewhere. But a group of species traditionally placed in Huia as well as the genus Clinotarsus are very close relatives, and therefore a taxonomic revision of this group is probably better deferred until the relationships of all taxa involved have been properly assessed. Meristogenys on its own is a monophyletic group.

== Ecology ==
Meristogenys are common frogs around the mountain streams of Borneo and among the commonest frogs in the mountainous regions of the island. Tadpoles are specialized for living in strong currents and have a heavy body. The snout is broadly rounded with a relatively oral disk underneath it. The body is flat below and has a large sucker, covering a larger portion of the abdomen.

== Description ==
The largest species is Meristogenys kinabaluensis; males reach 68 mm (2.7 in) and females 93 mm (3.7 in) in snout–vent length. Adults of different species are usually morphologically similar and difficult identify to species, and even difficult to distinguish from other ranid frogs, notably Hylarana. In contrast, and unusually, the tadpoles are easier to identify to species than the adults.

== Species ==
There are 13 species:

- Meristogenys amoropalamus (Matsui, 1986)
- Meristogenys dyscritus Shimada, Matsui, Yambun, and Sudin, 2011
- Meristogenys jerboa (Günther, 1872)
- Meristogenys kinabaluensis (Inger, 1966)
- Meristogenys macrophthalmus (Matsui, 1986)
- Meristogenys maryatiae Matsui, Shimada, and Sudin, 2010
- Meristogenys orphnocnemis (Matsui, 1986)
- Meristogenys penrissenensis Shimada, Matsui, Nishikawa, and Eto, 2015
- Meristogenys phaeomerus (Inger and Gritis, 1983)
- Meristogenys poecilus (Inger and Gritis, 1983)
- Meristogenys stenocephalus Shimada, Matsui, Yambun, and Sudin, 2011
- Meristogenys stigmachilus Shimada, Matsui, Yambun, and Sudin, 2011
- Meristogenys whiteheadi (Boulenger, 1887)
