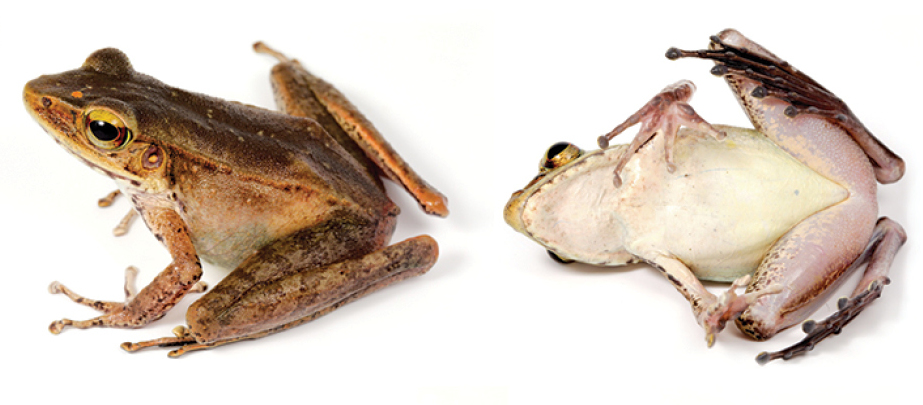
- Pairs of photos (dorsolateral and ventral) depict the same individual

Conservation status
- Least Concern (IUCN 3.1)

Scientific classification
- Kingdom: Animalia
- Phylum: Chordata
- Class: Amphibia
- Order: Anura
- Family: Ranidae
- Genus: Meristogenys
- Species: M. orphnocnemis

Binomial name
- Meristogenys orphnocnemis (Matsui, 1986)

Synonyms
- Amolops orphnocnemis Matsui, 1986

= Meristogenys orphnocnemis =

Species of frog in family Ranidae

Meristogenys orphnocnemis is a species of frog in the family Ranidae, sometimes known as Sabah Borneo frog or dusky-footed torrent frog. It is endemic to Borneo and found in the mountains of Sabah (Malaysia), Brunei, and East Kalimantan (Indonesia). Its natural habitats are hilly lowland rainforest, also occurring in slightly disturbed forests. Tadpoles live in clear, rocky forest streams where they cling to rocks in strong currents. Siltation of streams caused by deforestation is a threat to this species.

Male Meristogenys orphnocnemis grow to a snout–vent length of about 50 mm (2.0 in) and females to 70 mm (2.8 in). Tadpoles are up to 35 mm (1.4 in) in length.
