= Gosner stage =

System of describing stages of development in anurans

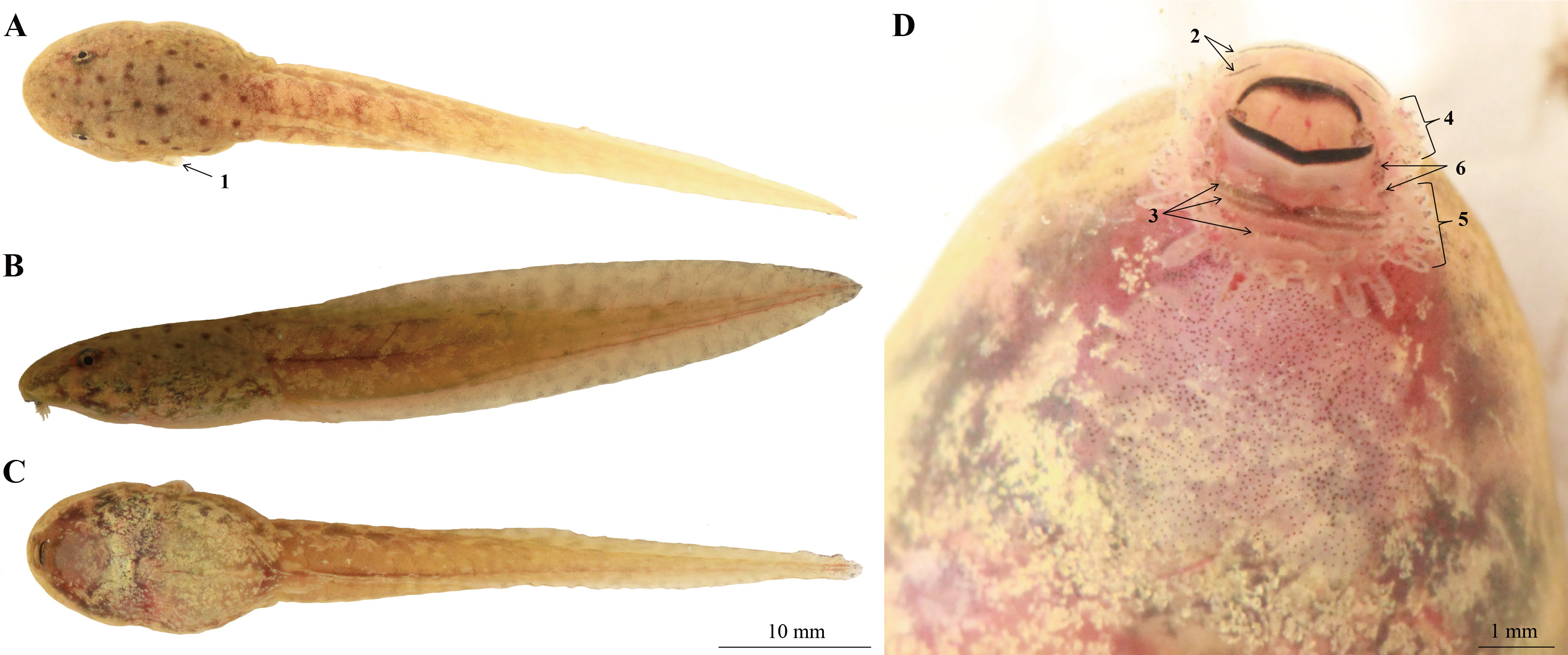
Gosner stage 31 tadpole of Nidirana leishanensis. (A) Dorsal view. (B) Lateral view. (C) Ventral view. (D) Mouth structure.

Gosner stage is a generalized system of describing stages of embryonal and larval development in anurans (frogs and toads). The Gosner system includes 46 numbered stages, from fertilized embryo (stage 1) to the completion of metamorphosis (stage 46). It was introduced by Kenneth Gosner in 1960. The system is widely used in herpetology to describe exotrophic tadpoles. Gosner stages are based on certain morphological landmarks that allow comparing development in different species that may greatly differ in age or size.

== Developmental stages ==
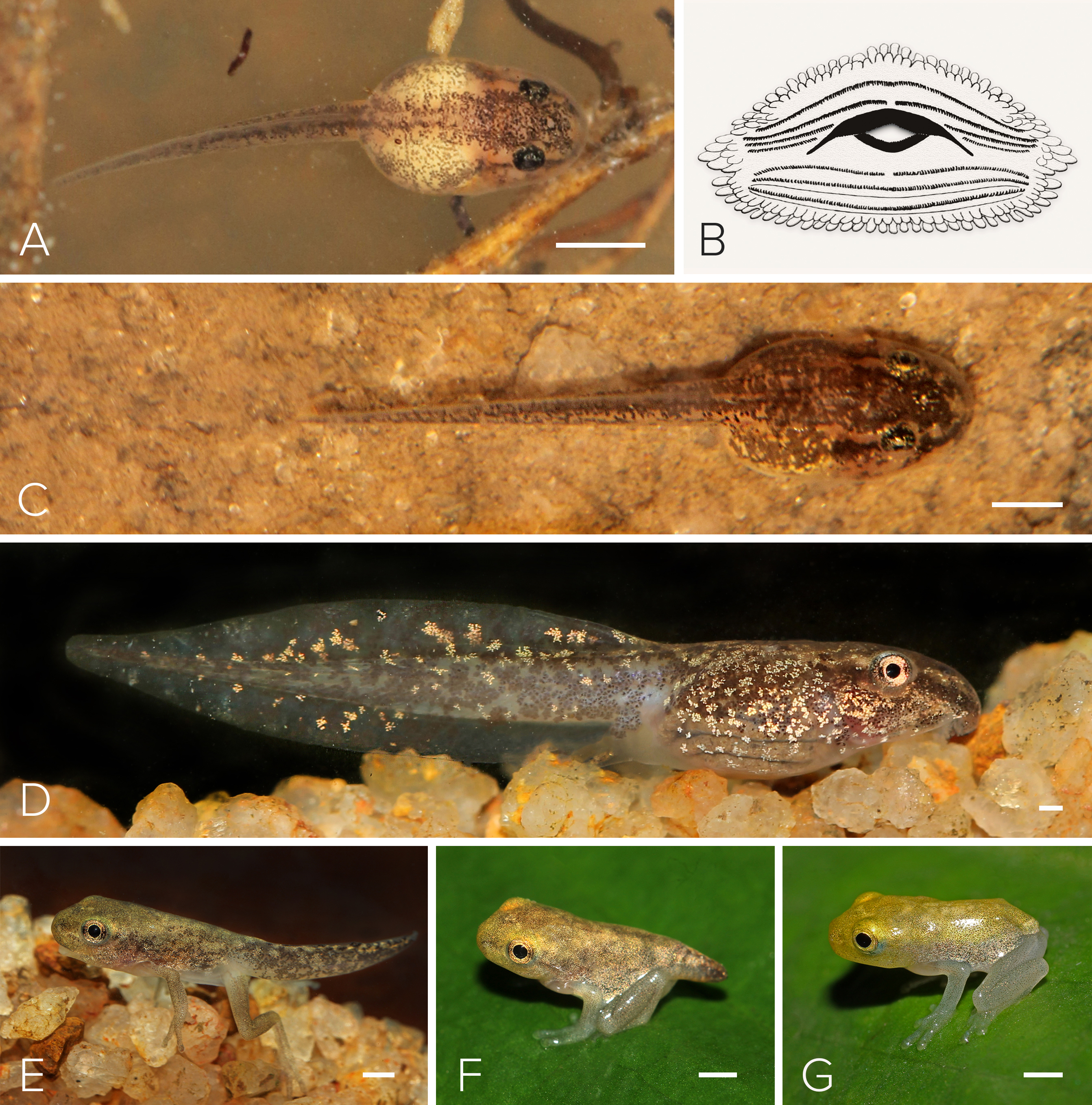
Tadpoles of Mercurana myristicapalustris. Stages (A) 28, (B) illustration of the oral apparatus, (C) 29, (D) 30 (E) 42 (F) 44 and (G) 45.

The Gosner system includes 46 stages, from fertilized embryo (stage 1) to the completion of metamorphosis (stage 46). In the original publication, only two major developmental stages were distinguished, embryonic or prefeeding stages (1–25) and larval stages (26–46). McDiarmid and Altig (1999) distinguish four major developmental stages, as detailed in the table below.

Developmental category	Gosner stages	Description
Embryo	1 to 20 (about)	Intracapsular. Development through cleavage, gastrulation, and appearance of neural tube and eventually gills and tail.
Hatchling	21 (about) to 24	Transition from relatively immobile embryo to an active, feeding tadpole. Specimens at these stages may sometimes be referred to as "larvae".
Tadpole	25 to 41	Longest part of larval period that is marked by growth and development of limbs. The generic term "larvae" often refers to these stages.
Metamorph	42 to 46	Loss of larval characters and development of adult structures; typically associated with the transition from the aquatic to the terrestrial habitats

In ecological literature, the term "hatchling" may refer to stages 24–26. However, for direct-developing species, hatching occurs in the end of the development.

== Limitations ==
As a generalized system, Gosner stages may not be adequate for describing development of some anuran tadpoles. For example, in the torrent-dwelling tadpoles of Ansonia longidigita and Meristogenys orphnocnemis, the usual Gosner stages become inappropriate beyond the stage 41 because the tadpoles retain their oral disc longer than the system depicts. This is interpreted as an adaptation that allows the tadpoles to cling to the rocks until the tail is almost fully resorbed. In Limnonectes limborgi, the tadpoles are free-living but non-feeding ("nidicolous") and retain their yolk sac until stage 37, at least. Direct-developing frogs hatch directly as froglets, without free-living larval stage.
